= List of Israeli films of 1996 =

A list of films produced by the Israeli film industry in 1996.

== 1996 releases ==
Premiere	Title	Director	Cast	Genre	Notes	Ref
May	Layla Lavan (Hebrew: לילה לבן, lit. "White night")	Arnon Zadok	Sharon Alexander, Idan Alterman, Liora Rivlin	Drama		
August 25	Nashim (Hebrew: נשים, lit. "Women")	Moshé Mizrahi	Michal Bat-Adam	Drama		
August 30	Ha-Italkim Ba'im (Hebrew: האיטלקים באים, lit. "The Italians are coming")	Eyal Halfon	Franco Nero, Asher Tzarfati	Drama, Romance, Sport	Israeli-Italian co-production	
September	Chronicle of a Disappearance (Hebrew: כרוניקה של העלמות)	Elia Suleiman	Elia Suleiman	Drama	Israeli-Palestinian-American-German-French co-production	
September 8	Zirat Ha'Rezach (Hebrew: זירת הרצח, lit. "The murder scene")	Amos Gitai	?	Documentary		
November 1	Saint Clara (Hebrew: קלרה הקדושה)	Ari Folman and Ori Sivan	Lucy Dubinchik, Halil Elohev	Drama, Fantasy, Romance		

=== Unknown premiere date ===
Premiere	Title	Director	Cast	Genre	Notes	Ref
?	Tze'irim Lanetzah (Hebrew: צעירים לנצח, lit. "Forever Young")	Michael Behagen	Saar Badishi, Uri Gavriel, Arnon Zadok, Michal Zoharetz	Drama		
?	Zolgot Hadma'ot Me'atzman (Hebrew: זולגות הדמעות מעצמן, lit. "Tears Fall by Themselves")	Eitan Green	Avi Grainik	Drama		
?	Klavim Lo Novhim Beyarok (Hebrew: כלבים לא נובחים בירוק, lit. "Dogs do not bark on green light")	Orna Raviv and Yohanan Raviv	Keren Mor, Rami Heuberger, Dov Navon, Menashe Noy	Comedy		
?	Tziporim B'nyutral (Hebrew: ציפורים בניוטרל, lit. "Birds in Neutral")	Galit Eshkol and Eyal Shiray	Dana Berger, Maor Cohen, Dana Modan	Comedy, Romance		
?	Ha-Khetzi HaSheni (Hebrew: החצי השני, lit. "The Second Half")	Ori Inbar	Orna Banai, Alon Aboutboul	Comedy		
?	Metamorphosis of a Melody (Hebrew: מילים, lit. "Words")	Amos Gitai	Ronit Elkabetz, Samuel Fuller	Drama		
?	Bloodguilt (Hebrew: קשר דם)	Yaky Yosha	Amos Lavi, Yael Hadar, Avital Dicker	Thriller		
?	Under Western Eyes	Joseph Pitchhadze		Drama	Entered into the 47th Berlin International Film Festival	

== Awards ==
=== Ophir Award ===	=== Wolgin Award ===

== See also ==
- 1996 in Israel
