= In Therapy =

In Therapy may refer to:

- BeTipul (In Therapy), a 2005 Israeli drama television series
  - In Therapy (French TV series), a 2021 French remake of the Israeli TV series
  - En thérapie, a 2012 French Canadian drama remake of the Israeli TV series
- In Therapy (British TV series), a 2015 British television reality series

== See also ==
- In Treatment
