= Lucy Dubinchik =

Soviet Russian-born Israeli actress (born 1982)

- לוסי דובינצ'יק
- Lucy Dubinchik, 2006
- Born: 17 December 1982 (age 43); Moscow, Soviet Union
- Occupation: Actress
- Years active: 1993–present
- Awards: Ophir Award (1996)

Lucy Dubinchik (Hebrew: לוסי דובינצ'יק; born 17 December 1982) is an Israeli film, television, and stage actress.

== Biography ==
Lucy Dubinchik was born and raised in Moscow, Soviet Union. In 1989, at the age of seven, she immigrated with her family to Israel. She has two brothers and one sister. Her family initially lived in Rehovot and in 1992 the family relocated to Tel Aviv.

During 1992, at the age of 10, Dubinchik was signed as a model at the Yuli modeling agency. As a model she worked in modeled for various campaigns, catalogs, and advertisements until 1994.

Dubinchik attended the Thelma Yellin High School of the Arts in Givatayim, where she studied in the acting and theater department. She later continued her acting training at the Nissan Nativ Acting Studio in Tel Aviv.

=== Film career ===
Dubinchik made her on-screen debut in the 1993 Israeli film "Zohar", a biographical drama about the renowned Israeli singer Zohar Argov. In the film she played a minor role as the girlfriend of titular character's son.

Her breakthrough came in 1996 when she starred as Clara in the Israeli film "Saint Clara", directed by Ari Folman and Ori Sivan. The film won the Ophir Award for Best Feature Film, and Dubinchik won the Ophir Award for Best Leading Actress, making her the youngest actress ever to win the award.

In 1999, she starred in the Israeli film "Yana's Friends", in which she portrayed the daughter of the street musician Yuri.

Following her graduation from acting school, Dubinchik appeared in the American-Israeli student film "Make-up", directed by Inbar Gilboa, as well as in the 2006 Israeli film "Little Heroes" and the 2006 Israeli crime drama film "Salt of the Earth", directed by Uri Barbash, in which she played a young widow. In 2006 she also played in the short mockumentary film "The Story of G.G. Eselmund", directed by Yoav Nevo. She also appeared in the short horror film "Good You're Back Home", directed by Lior Hefetz.

In 2008 Dubinchik starred in the French-Israeli co-production "Jerusalem Syndrome", directed by Stéphane Bélaïsch and Emmanuel Naccache. That same year, she played the lead role in Yair Hochner's romantic comedy "Antarctica".

In 2008 Dubinchik starred in the Israeli film "Maftir", directed by David Ben Ari. In 2012 she played in Assi Dayan’s film "Dr. Pomerantz". That same year, she played in the Russian film "The Conductor", directed by Pavel Lungin.

In 2014 she played the lead role of Elizabeth, a Holocaust survivor who pretends to be a Nazi, in the Israeli film "Who Are You", directed by Ariel Cohen.

In 2020 she played in the Israeli short film "39", directed by Anat Schwartz.

=== Television career ===
Through the years Dubinchik has played in both drama series, telenovelas, and soap operas. She made her television debut in 1998 with a recurring role in the series "Florentine". In 2003 she played in the Israeli telenovela "Ha-Chatzer" on the lives of Hasidic Jews in Israel.

Later on she played in the Israeli telenovela "Michaela", which was broadcast on Hot 3, portraying Mia Akrish, a bulimic model struggling with a drug addiction.

In 2004, she played in the TV movie "Letters from Rishikesh", directed by Daniel Wachsmann, which was filmed in India.

The following year, she played in the TV movie "Green Chariot", directed by Gili Goldschmidt, and played the lead role in the Russian mini-series "Under the Sky of Verona", a modern-day adaptation of Romeo and Juliet set in a Russian-Jewish community, which was filmed in Israel, Russia and Verona.

In 2007, she played the lead role in the drama series "A Touch Away" in which she played the character Natalia Mintz, whom is a figure skater and Russian immigrant whom struggles to adjust to her new life in Israel. In 2008, she played a religious settler during the 2005 Israeli disengagement from the Gaza Strip in the TV movie "The Ruth Affair". That same year, she participated in the Israeli version of "Dancing with the Stars" alongside the professional dancer Dennis Belochrekovski.

In 2010, Dubinchik played in the German TV movie "Duet for Murder". In 2013, she starred in the drama series "House of Wishes", written and directed by Haim Bozaglo.

In 2015, she played in the second season of the documentary series "6 Mothers" broadcast on Channel 2.

=== Theater career ===
Dubinchik started performing in various theater productions at a young age, appearing in various plays across multiple theaters, including the musical "Avenue Q".

In 2005 she played the lead role in the play "The Ark" in which she portrayed the daughter of a French bourgeois family who meets and falls in love with a Serbian homosexual refugee. The play follows their attempts to build a life together despite societal challenges.

In 2007 she joined the Gesher Theater, where she remained active until 2020, performing in over 15 productions including The Dybbuk, Mr. Vertigo, Dom Juan and Don Quixote.

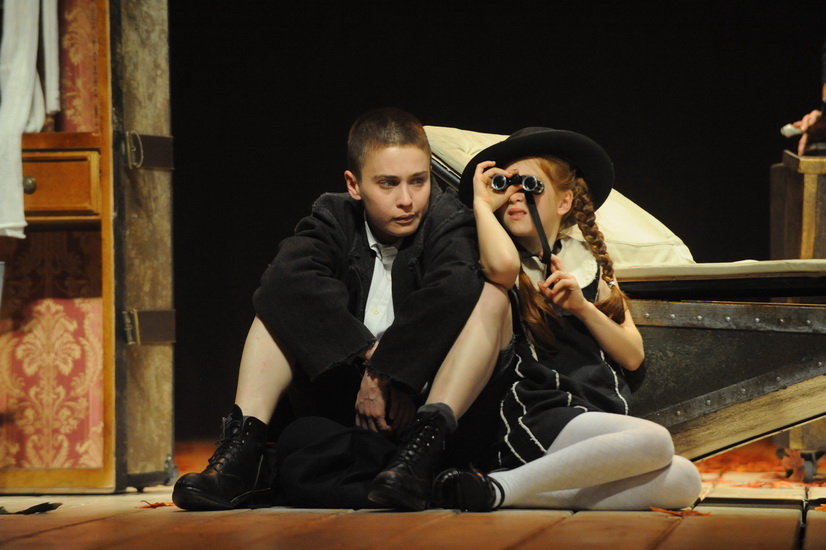
Lucy Dubinchik in the play "Six Characters Seeking an Author" at the Gesher Theater, 2010

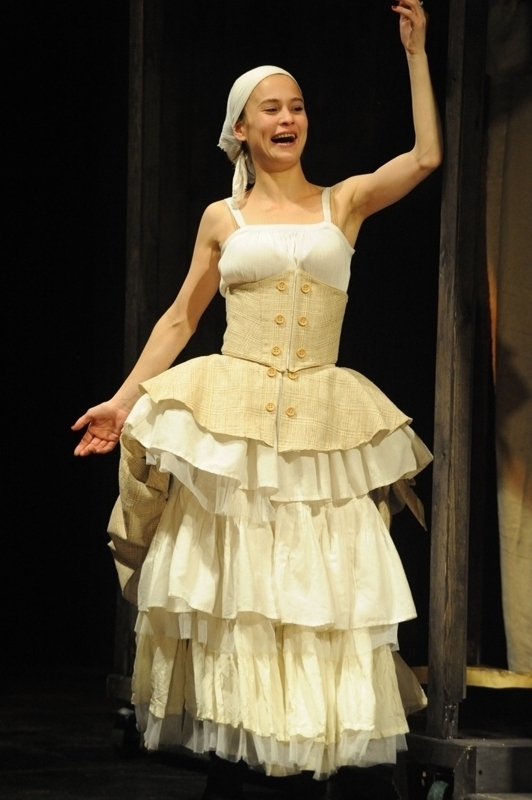
Lucy Dubinchik in the play "Dom Juan" at the Gesher Theater, 2010

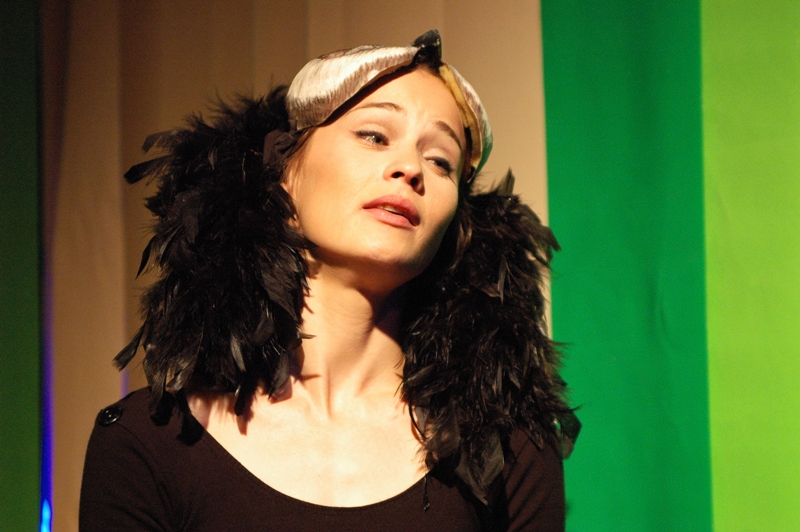
Lucy Dubinchik in the play "La Fontaine - The Enchanted Forest" at the Gesher Theater, 2012

== Personal life ==
Dubinchik had a daughter with Johnny Peterson in 2007, whom she initially met when they both starred in the film "Saint Clara". She married Israeli director Shai Ben Atar in 2010, and they divorced in 2012.

On August 1, 2017, she fell from her fourth-floor residence in Jaffa and was hospitalized at the Tel Aviv Sourasky Medical Center in serious condition. Her condition later stabilized and was classified as moderate. Her injury required extensive medical treatment and rehabilitation. While at the hospital she met Hagai Fuchs, with whom she was engaged to before she left the hospital. The couple had a daughter in 2018 and a son in 2019.

== Filmography ==
=== Film ===
Year	Title	Director	Role	Notes
1993	Zohar	Eran Riklis	Gilly's girlfriend	
1996	Saint Clara	Ori Sivan and Ari Folman	Clara Chanov	
1999	Yana's Friends	Eric Kaplon	Yuri's daughter	
2004	Make-Up	Inbar Gilboa	Ayala	Short film
2006	The Story of C. G. Esselmond	Yoav Nevo	Brigitte	The opening film of the Tel Aviv International Student Film Festival
2006	Welcome Home	Lior Hefetz	Adi	Short film
2006	Little Heroes	Itay Lev	Marina	
2006	Salt of the Earth	Uri Barbash	Anna	
2007	Jerusalem Syndrome	Emmanuel Naccache and Stéphane Bélaïsch	Yvonne	
2007	Maftir	David Ben Ari	Oksana	
2008	The Story of Ruth	Keren Avitan	Ruth Schiffman	
2008	Antarctica	Yair Hochner	Shirley	
2009	Mika	Merav Hatab	Mika	Short film
2012	Dr. Pomerantz	Assi Dayan	Efrat Zimmer	
2013	The Conductor	Pavel Longin	Dina	
2014	In the Next Lifetime	Amir Ovadia Steklov	Lucy	Short film
2016	Who Are You?	Ariel Cohen	Elizabeth	
2016	Little Leaf	Tali Avrahami	Tali	
2016	On the Six Day	Amichai Chasson	Rona	
2020	39	Alice	Alice	

=== Television ===
Year	Title	Channel	Director	Role	Notes
1998	Florentine	Channel 2	Ori Sivan, Eytan Fox, Arik Rothstein	Lotus Tapuach	TV series
2001	Postal West Galilee	Channel 2	Ofer Weizmann	Ma'ayan	Mini-series
2003	Ha-Chatzer	The Azure Channel	Avi Cohen	Gitel Rotenberg	TV series
2004	Michaela	HOT3	Yitzhak Shauli	Miya Akrish	TV series
2004	Letters from Rishikesh	Daniel Wachsmann	Maya		TV Movie
2004	M.K. 22	Bip	Assaf Harel	voice	TV series
2005	A Green Chariot	Gilad Goldschmidt	Julia		TV movie
2007	A Touch Away	Channel 2	Ronnie Nino	Natalia Mintz	TV series
2010	Mörderischer Besuch	German television	Dascha	Dasha	TV series
2013	House of Wishes	Channel 1	Haim Bozaglo		TV series
2014	Pimping		Nimrod Amit, Tomer Shechori	Prostitute	TV Movie
2016	6 Mothers	Channel 2	Eitan Shmuelof	A mother	TV series
2018	Gav Ha'Uma	Channel 10	Sivan Magaznik		TV series

== Awards and nominations ==
Year	Award	Category	Nominated work	Result	Ref.
1996	Ophir Award	Best Actress	"Saint Clara"	Won	
