= Igal Naor =

Israeli actor (born 1958)

- יגאל נאור
- Born: 25 June 1958 (age 68); Givatayim, Israel
- Education: Tel Aviv University
- Occupation: Actor
- Years active: 1987–present
- Notable credits: Munich (2005); Green Zone (2010); House of Saddam (2008); Fauda (2017–18); Monument (2026)
- Awards: 1996 Ophir Award for Best Supporting Actor; 2009 Golden Nymph Award; 2019 Equity Ensemble Award

Igal Naor (Hebrew: יגאל נאור; born 25 June 1958) is an Israeli actor, sometimes credited as Yigal Naor.

Naor has acted over three decades, in both film and television. His notable film credits include his debut in Deadline (1987), an award-winning role in Saint Clara (1996), and international roles in Munich (2005), Rendition (2007), Green Zone (2010), and 300: Rise of an Empire (2014). In television, Naor is recognized for his title role in the miniseries House of Saddam (2008), along with performances in The Honourable Woman (2014), Homeland (2015), Riviera (2017–18), and Fauda (2017–18).

His most recent movie was the 2026 American historical drama film Monument, directed by Bryan Singer. In that film Naor acted as General Antoine Lahad, leader of the South Lebanon Army, alongside Jon Voight and Joseph Mazzello.

== Early life ==
Naor was born on June 25, 1958, in Givatayim, Israel, to Mizrahi Jewish parents. His parents had emigrated from Baghdad, Iraq, in the early 1950s following the creation of Israel.

Because his parents worked long hours, Naor was raised primarily by his Iraqi-born grandmother during his first five years. As a result of this upbringing, his first language and mother tongue was Arabic; he spoke exclusively Arabic and did not know any Hebrew during his early childhood years. Naor has credited this immersion in a traditional Iraqi household and Arabic culture as fundamental to his later acting career, noting that it provided him with the cultural and linguistic depth to authentically portray Middle Eastern characters, such as Saddam Hussein.

He studied at Tel Aviv University.

== Film career ==
=== 1987–99 ===
Naor began his professional acting career in 1987, making his feature film debut as Antoine in the war thriller Deadline (also released as Witness in the War Zone), directed by Nathaniel Gutman and starring Christopher Walken. Over the next decade, he appeared in productions including the drama film The Seventh Coin.

His major breakthrough arrived in 1996 with his performance as the eccentric Headmaster Tissona in the cult classic comedy-drama Saint Clara (Hebrew: חלוש החלשה, Clara Hakedosha), directed by Ari Folman and Ori Sivan. The film became a hallmark of 1990s Israeli cinema, sweeping the national awards circuit. For his performance, Naor won the 1996 Ophir Award for Best Supporting Actor—presented by the Israeli Academy of Film and Television and regarded as the "Israeli Oscar."

=== 2000–09 ===
In 2005, Naor transitioned into mainstream international cinema when director Steven Spielberg cast him as the Palestinian official and target Mahmoud Hamshari in the historical political drama Munich. This role opened the door to a series of appearances in major Hollywood thrillers. In 2007, he co-starred alongside Reese Witherspoon, Meryl Streep, and Jake Gyllenhaal in the political thriller Rendition, directed by Gavin Hood. Naor played Abasi Fawal, a ruthless North African prison director executing the CIA extraordinary rendition policy.

In 2008, Naor was cast in the titular role of Iraqi president Saddam Hussein in the four-part biographical miniseries House of Saddam, a joint television docudrama production between the BBC and HBO that tracked the inner workings, domestic relationships, and eventual fall of the Iraqi dictator and his family. The casting of an Israeli Jew of Iraqi descent to portray Saddam Hussein drew international media attention, triggering both critical curiosity and political discussion within the Middle Eastern arts community. Naor's performance was met with critical acclaim from international television critics, who described his screen presence as transfixing and chillingly convincing. Reviewers noted that Naor avoided playing the dictator as a one-dimensional caricature, instead delivering a careful performance that juxtaposed Hussein's documented bursts of charm and regional pride with his volatile megalomania and systemic cruelty. Serena Davis of The Daily Telegraph was impressed that "Naor's towering version of the dictator envisioned him as both adept family schemer and political giant."

=== 2010–present ===
Director Paul Greengrass cast Naor as a deceptive and high-value Iraqi insurgent leader, in the 2010 Iraq War political thriller Green Zone, starring opposite Matt Damon. In 2014, Naor portrayed the historical Persian monarch King Darius I in Zack Snyder's blockbuster sequel epic historical action film 300: Rise of an Empire.

His most recent movie was the 2026 American historical drama film Monument, directed by Bryan Singer. In the movie, Naor acted as General Antoine Lahad, leader of the South Lebanon Army, alongside Jon Voight and Joseph Mazzello.

== Television career ==
Naor has also worked in international television, and his television roles include portraying a Syrian general in season five of Showtime's political espionage thriller series Homeland (2015), and starring as a former security chief turned criminal figure, across 15 episodes of the British luxury crime drama series Riviera (2017–19). Additionally, he portrayed the retired former head of a special operations unit and father of the main protagonist Doron, in the Netflix-distributed Israeli action-thriller series Fauda (2017–18).

== Selected filmography and television ==
- Deadline (1987) – Antoine
- The Seventh Coin (1993) – Grocer
- The Mummy Lives (1993) – Egyptology official
- Saint Clara (1996) – Headmaster Tissona
- Ha-Dybbuk B'sde Hatapuchim Hakdoshim (1997; also known as Ahava Asura) – Sender
- Miss Entebbe (2003) – Avram
- Bonjour Monsieur Shlomi (2003) – Headmaster Avihu
- Munich (2005) – Mahmoud Hamshari
- Djihad! (2006, TV Movie) – Colonel Walid
- Rendition (2007) – Abasi Fawal
- House of Saddam (2008, TV Mini-Series) – Saddam Hussein
- A House Divided (2008) – Ahmed
- Occupation (2009, TV Mini-Series) – Dr. Sadiq Alasadi
- Green Zone (2010) – General Mohammed Al Rawi
- The Infidel (2010) – Arshad El-Masri
- I Am Slave (2010) – Said
- Dead Europe (2012) – Syd
- Sinbad (2012, TV Series) – Emir
- Farewell Baghdad (2013) – Salman
- Ambassadors (2013, TV Mini-Series) – President Karzak
- The Honourable Woman (2014, TV Mini-Series) – Shlomo Zahary
- 300: Rise of an Empire (2014) – King Darius I
- Suicide (2014; also known as Hitabdut) – Muki
- Homeland (2015, TV Series) – General Youssef
- False Flag (2015, TV Series) – Gavriel "Gabi" Silver
- The Women's Balcony (2016) – Zion
- The Promise (2016) – Mesrob
- Riviera (2017–19, TV Series) – Jakob Negrescu
- Stratton (2017) – Tariq Alawi
- Maktub (2017) – Tzafuf
- Damascus Cover (2017) – General Fuad
- Fauda (2017–18, TV Series) – Amos Kabilio
- The Unorthodox (2018) – Rabbi Ovadia Yosef
- On the Ropes (2018, TV Mini-Series) – Sami Al-Amir
- Oslo (2021, TV Movie) – Joel Singer
- Hit & Run (2021, TV Series) – Tamir Edri
- Legend of Destruction (2021) – John of Giscala
- Wendell & Wild (2022) – Manberg
- Highway 65 (2024) – Nissim
- Kugel (2024) – Rabbi Vermout
- Monument (2026) – General Antoine Lahad, leader of the South Lebanon Army

== Awards and nominations ==
Year	Award	Category	Work	Result
1996	Ophir Award	Best Supporting Actor	Saint Clara	Won
2009	Golden Nymph Award	Outstanding Actor in a Mini-Series	House of Saddam	Won
2019	Equity Ensemble Awards	Outstanding Performance by an Ensemble in a Mini-series or Telemovie	On the Ropes	Nominated

== See also ==
- List of Israeli actors
