= Barefoot (miniseries) =

Israeli television miniseries

- יחפים
- Genre: Drama
- Created by: Ori Sivan
- Starring: Sivan Levy; Karen Berger; Sarah Adler; Ohad Knoller; Muki; Ofer Schechter; Marina Maximilian Blumin; Rose Feldman; Yehezkel Lazarov; Danielle Wircer; Shai Avivi; Alon Abutbul
- Country of origin: Israel
- Original language: Hebrew
- No. of seasons: 1
- No. of episodes: 6

Production
- Executive producers: Udi Zamberg; Michael Tupuach
- Running time: 60 minutes

Original release
- Network: HOT 3
- Release: December 5, 2011

Barefoot (Hebrew: יחפים, translit. Yekhefim) is a 2011 Israeli TV miniseries created and directed by Ori Sivan. It aired in 6 episodes on Israel's HOT 3 channel. It was released on December 5, 2011.

It is currently being made into a feature film by the same director.

== Plot ==
The series is a sweeping historical drama that follows three generations of one family on a kibbutz.

== Cast ==
- Sivan Levy as Fanny
- Karen Berger
- Sarah Adler
- Ohad Knoller
- Muki [Daniel Niv]
- Ofer Shechter
- Marina Maximilian Blumin
- Rose Feldman
- Yehezkel Lazarov
- Danielle Wircer
- Shai Avivi
- Alon Abutbul
