= BeTipul =

2005 Israeli TV drama

- Genre: Drama
- Created by: Hagai Levi; Ori Sivan; Nir Bergman
- Starring: Assi Dayan; Gila Almagor; Meirav Gruber; Ayelet Zurer; Lior Ashkenazi; Maya Maron; Alma Zack; Rami Heuberger; Moni Moshonov; Asi Levi; Niv Zilberberg; Tali Sharon
- Theme music composer: Avi Belleli
- Country of origin: Israel
- No. of seasons: 2
- No. of episodes: 80

Production
- Running time: 30 min.

Original release
- Network: HOT3
- Release: August 28, 2005 – March 6, 2008

Related
- In Treatment; Sessão de Terapia; En terapia In Therapie; În Derivă; Na terapiji En terapia Bez tajemnic На терапија En thérapie

BeTipul (Hebrew: בטיפול; lit. In Therapy) is an Israeli television drama, winner of the Television Academy Award, revolving around the personal and professional life of an Israeli psychologist, Reuven Dagan, played by Assi Dayan. The series portrays a psychologist who treats patients at his clinic five days a week and then seeks psychological treatment for himself. Filmmaker Ori Sivan served as the head writer of the series together with Hagai Levi and Nir Bergman. Following the show's success it was bought by HBO, which remade an American version (In Treatment) which was aired two years later.

== Overview ==
As of 2024, two seasons have been produced, with co-creators Hagai Levi, Ori Sivan, and Nir Bergman working on a spin-off program in a format similar to the Up series. The program has been adapted for audiences in the United States, Argentina, North Macedonia, Serbia, Croatia, Slovenia, Portugal, Poland, Hungary, Czech Republic, Slovakia, Romania, Moldova, Netherlands, Japan, Canada, Russia, Italy, Brazil, Chile and France.

In the first season, the cast included Assi Dayan as Dagan, Gila Almagor as Dagan's own therapist and mentor, Meirav Gruber as his wife, and Ayelet Zurer, Lior Ashkenazi, Maya Maron, Alma Zack and Rami Heuberger as his patients. The first season was directed by Nir Bergman, Hagai Levi, Ori Sivan, and Uzi Weill. Scriptwriters were Ari Folman, and Asaf Tzipor.

In the second season, which began in January 2008, a female therapist was considered for the leading role, but the idea was dropped. Dagan remained the main character. Zack, Heuberger and Almagor continued in their roles from the previous season. Other actors joining the cast were Moni Moshonov, Asi Levi, Niv Zilberberg, and Tali Sharon.

The multi awarded show Be Tipul, together with "A Touch Away" (Another Israeli TV show that was later bought and made into an American version), were, by many critics, the major factor in the "Boom" and rise of Israeli TV dramas in the mid-2000s, although "beTipul" was not considered a high profit investment, it did entice the development of new formats alike, and indeed more drama formats were acquired over the next two years including "Mesudarim" (Loaded) and "Mythological Ex".

== Awards and nominations ==
BeTipul in its first season won all the Israeli Academy Awards for a drama series, including Best Drama Series, Best Actor, and Best Actress given to Dayan and Zurer, Best Script, and Best Directing. Maron and Zack were also nominated for Best Actress. In its second season, it was nominated for Best Drama, along with 7 other nominations. Dayan won again the Best Actor award, and Levi and Zack both won the Best Actress award. Season 2 also won the Best Script award.

== Adaptations ==
=== North America ===
==== United States ====
An American adaptation entitled In Treatment premiered January 28, 2008 on the American cable network HBO to critical and audience acclaim. Seasons 1-3 of the show star Gabriel Byrne as Dr. Paul Weston, the equivalent character to Reuven Dagan and Dianne Wiest as Gina, Paul's own therapist. After an 11-year hiatus, the show returned for season 4, starring Uzo Aduba as Dr. Brooke Taylor. Hagai Levi, co-creator of the original show, is one of the executive producers on the American version.

==== Canada ====
The U.S. version was shown in Canada from 5 April 2009.

A French Canadian adaptation, titled En thérapie, aired on TV5 Québec Canada in 2012. The series starred François Papineau in the role of psychologist Philippe Jacob. A second season aired in 2014.

=== South America ===
==== Argentina ====
In May 2012, Argentina's public television network, TV Pública, started airing the local adaptation of the show. Titled En terapia (literally "In therapy"), it's starred by local renowned actor (and a former psychiatrist himself) Diego Peretti as Guillermo Montes, the equivalent character to Reuven Dagan, and Norma Aleandro (Season 1 and 2) as Lucía Aranda, Guillermo's own therapist. It aired Mondays to Thursdays around 10:30 p.m. The third and last season was released in 2014.

==== Brazil ====
The Brazilian adaptation of BeTipul premiered on October 1, 2012, on GNT, under the title Sessão de Terapia ("Therapy Session"). Actor Zé Carlos Machado is cast in the role of Theo Ceccato, the protagonist, and Maria Luísa Mendonça playing Theo's wife Clarice. Veteran actress Selma Egrei stars as Dora Aguiar, Theo's mentor. Patients are played by Maria Fernanda Cândido, Sérgio Guizé, Bianca Muller, Mariana Lima, and André Frateschi. The series is directed by the Brazilian TV actor Selton Mello. After a five-year hiatus, the series returned with a new protagonist Dr. Caio Baronne Selton Mello, with Morena Baccarin as his mentor for one season, being replaced by Rodrigo Santoro.

==== Chile ====
Chilean adaption was broadcast by TVN under the name "En terapia". Is starred by Alfredo Castro, a renowned actor, as Guillermo Montes.

=== Europe ===
==== Central Europe ====
In April 2010, HBO's Central Europe division acquired format rights for BeTipul from Dori Media Group. It was announced that HBO would produce local versions of the series in Poland, Hungary, the Czech Republic, Slovakia, Romania and Moldova, for transmission on its channels throughout the region, and that Hagai Levi would serve as its executive producer.

- The Romanian version was the first to be produced. With Marcel Iureş in the title role and under the name of În derivă ("Adrift"), it premiered on December 6, 2010, on HBO.
- The Czech version aired on Czech HBO in 2011 under the name Terapie ("Therapy"), starring Karel Roden as therapist Marek Pošta in the main role.
- The Polish version premiered on October 17, 2011, on HBO under the title Bez tajemnic ("Without Secrets"), starring Jerzy Radziwiłowicz in the main role and with three seasons having aired as of 2013.
- The Hungarian version, titled Terápia ("Therapy"), starring Pál Mácsai, Erika Marozsán premiered on October 22, 2012.

==== Serbia ====
Na terapiji is the title of the Serbian adaptation. It premiered on October 19, 2009, on Fox Televizija. The main actor is Predrag Miki Manojlović as Dr. Ljubomir. The cast also includes: Snežana Bogdanović, Sergej Trifunović, Nenad Jezdić, Tamara Vučković, Nataša Janjić and Dragana Dabović as his patients and Branka Cvitković as Ljubomir's own therapist.

==== Netherlands ====
The title of the Dutch adaptation is In therapie. It premiered on July 26, 2010. The director is Alain de Levita. The therapist is played by Jacob Derwig. The other characters are played by Carice van Houten, Elsie de Brauw, Halina Reijn, Dragan Bakema, Gaite Jansen, Frederik Brom, and Kim van Kooten (Derwig's real life wife). The second season of the series aired on July 25, 2011, with Paul as a patient instead of the psychologist, who is played by Peter Blok.

==== Slovenia ====
Na terapiji is also the title of the Slovenian version. It premiered on September 26, 2011, on POP Brio. The main actor is Igor Samobor as Dr. Roman. The cast also includes: Maša (Jana Župančič), Matej (Marko Mandić), Zarja (Nika Mansevski), Dana (Maša Drganc), Aleš (Dejan Spasič), and Silva Čušin as his patients, and Ema as Roman's own therapist.

==== Portugal ====
The Portuguese adaptation of BeTipul premiered on January 4, 2016, on RTP 1, under the title Terapia ("Therapy"). Actor Virgílio Castelo is cast in the role of Mário Magalhães, the protagonist and equivalent character to Reuven Dagan, and Veteran actress Ana Zanatti as Graça Ribeiro, Mário's own therapist and mentor. Leonor Silveira plays Theo's wife Catarina Magalhães. Patients are played by Catarina Rebelo, playing Sofia Cruz a 16 year old victim of a car accident, Nuno Lopes playing Alexandre Gomes, a SWAT Operative, Soraia Chaves as Laura Dias a Nurse about to get engaged but in love with someone else, and finally Filipe Duarte and Maria João Pinho as Jorge and Ana Velez, a couple living an obsessive marriage. The series is directed by Patrícia Sequeira.

==== Italy ====
In Treatment is also the title of the Italian version. It premiered on April 1, 2013, on Sky Italia, starring Sergio Castellitto as Dr. Giovanni Mari. The cast includes: Sara (Kasia Smutniak), Dario (Guido Caprino), Alice (Irene Casagrande), Lea (Barbora Bobulova) and Pietro (Adriano Giannini) as Dr. Mari's patients, Eleonora (Valeria Golino) as his Wife and Anna (Licia Maglietta) as Mari's own therapist.

==== Croatia ====
The Croatian version, titled Na terapiji, premiered on September 16, 2013, on Croatian Radiotelevision. The main actor is Elvis Bošnjak as therapist Tomislav Vukov. The cast also includes Ana Karić, Leon Lučev, Goran Bogdan, Dijana Vidušin, Iva Babić, Nina Violić, Žarko Savić, Frane Mašković, Suzana Nikolić and Katarina Strahinić. The screenplay was adapted by Lada Kaštelan.

==== North Macedonia ====
The Macedonian version, titled На терапија, premiered on September 18, 2017, on Sitel (TV channel). The main actor is Nikola Ristanovski as therapist Viktor Terziev. The cast also includes Jelena Jovanova, Tony Naumovski, Angela Dimitrova, Visar Vishka, Dragana Kostadinovska, Bedija Begovska, Amernis Noksikji, Dejan Lilic and others. The screenplay was adapted by Darko Mitrevski, Ognen Georgievski, Eleonora Veninova i Sasho Kokalanov.

==== France ====
The French version, titled En thérapie was directed by Éric Toledano and Olivier Nakache and set after the Bataclan attack in November 2015. Starring Frédéric Pierrot, the series premiered on January 28, 2021, on Arte TV. The series was subtitled and aired in Australia on SBS on Demand under the title In Therapy in November 2021. A second season was aired from April 2022, taking place during the COVID-19 crisis. Each series comprised 35 episodes.

=== Asia and the Pacific ===
==== Russia ====
Channel One premiered the Russian adaptation in 2012, titled Без свидетелей (Bez Svideteley) or "Without Witnesses". The first and so far only season consists of 45 episodes of 26 minutes each. While very closely tracking the original BeTipul script, the Russian version features a female in the leading role, played by Ksenia Kutepova as the psychotherapist.

==== Japan ====
Shinryouchuu -in the Room- (Japanese: 心療中-in the Room-; lit. "Now visiting -in the Room-") is the title of the Japanese adaptation. It premiered on January 12, 2013, on Nippon Television. The main actor is Goro Inagaki as psychologist Ryou Tenma. The main difference from the original show is that Dr. Tenma specialises in treating high school students.
