= Maya Maron =

Israeli actress

- מאיה מרון
- Born: Maya Maron; May 12, 1980 (age 46)
- Awards: Ophir Award (Broken Wings)

Maya Maron (Hebrew: מאיה מרון; born May 12, 1980) is an Israeli actress, an Ophir Award winner.

== Early life ==
Maron was raised in Tel Aviv, Israel. She is the youngest of four siblings. Her mother, an office manager, was born in Siberia, where her family fled from Poland before World War II. Her father was born in Eastern Europe and is a diamond dealer. She grew up on Balfour Street in Tel Aviv. When she was 12, her parents divorced after 24 years of marriage.

Maron went to the primary and secondary of School for the Arts Tel Aviv. During the fourth grade she was sent to the theater track, but did not stand out. In 1996, during the summer vacation between ninth and tenth grade, she was scouted in the Arad music festival and cast in Ari Folman's film Saint Clara, later she was nominated for the Ophir Award as a supporting actress in that film. She started high school at the notable Thelma Yellin High School for the Arts majoring in theatre, but a year later she moved to Ironi He, a regular municipal high school. She was not enlisted to the Israel Defense Forces, because she was underweight.

== Career ==
In 1998, Nir Bergman was producing his own film entitled Seahorses to be submitted as his graduation work for the Sam Spiegel Film and Television School, Jerusalem. Maya was cast as the lead role.

In 2002 Bergman cast her in the leading role in Broken Wings. A highly symbolic portrayal of a family living in Haifa and struggling to recover 9 months after the sudden and senseless loss of its father figure (himself appearing only in vague recollections and old family footage). She played the lead role of the daughter struggling to come to terms with her new position as head of the crumbling household, after mother Orly Silbersatz Banai shunts the task. The movie won audience approval as well as international and national critical acclaim appearing in numerous international film festivals. The movie won several awards including the Ophir Award for best picture, landing Maya with the best actress award.

Between 2003 and 2004, she played several minor parts in the films She's Not 17 alongside Dalia Shimko and Campfire. In 2005 she again played the lead in a Sam Spiegel student movie dubbed Whatever It Takes (Be'einaim Atsumot), as the fragile and self-destructive partner in a lesbian relationship.

In 2005, she was cast on the Betipul television series as a suicidal gymnast. She played the fiancée of the character played by Yehuda Levi in the crime series The Arbitrator ("Haborer"), and in 2009, she was cast in the lead role on the melodrama Weeping Susannah on HOT3.

In 2006 and 2007, her acting projects included a theatre role as Strophe in Phaedra's Love, Sarah Kane's modern take on the mythological tale of Phaedra and Hippolytus.

In 2015, she featured in several episodes of the second series of Shtisel portraying Hadassah Levi, a painter.

== Filmography ==
Year	Title	Role
1996	"Saint Clara"	Libby
1998	"Sea horses"	Maya
2002	"Broken wings"	Maya
2003	"No Longer 17"	Sarry
2004	"Campfire"	Esty
2005	"Whatever It Takes" (Hebrew: בעיניים עצומות)	Maya

=== Television ===
Year	Title	Role	Description
2005	"Milluim"	Maya	The lives of reserve soldiers in the army
2006	"Betipul"	Ayala	Psychotheraputic meetings
2007	"The Middle Man"	Orna	Battles for power in the Israeli underworld
2007	"Five men and a wedding"	Niva	Comic drama dealing with man's most basic fear, "commitment"
2015	"Shtisel"	Hadassah Levi	Drama following an ultra-Orthodox Haredi Jewish family
