= The Unorthodox =

- הבלתי רישמיים
- Directed by: Eliran Malka
- Written by: Eliran Malka
- Produced by: Rannan Gershoni; Yoni Faaran; Keren Michael
- Starring: Shuli Rand; Yaakov Cohen; Golan Azulai; Yoav Levi; Shifi Aloni; Or Lomborzo; Yigal Naor
- Cinematography: Yaron Sheraf
- Music by: Ofir Leibowitcz
- Release date: 2018
- Country: Israel

The Unorthodox is a 2018 Israeli drama film directed by Eliran Malka. It marks Malka's feature film debut, known previously as the creator of the TV series Shababnikim. The film's plot is based on the true story of the founding of the Shas political party in the 1980s in Jerusalem. The protagonist, Yaakov Cohen (Shuli Rand), is driven to form a religious political party representing the interests of Sephardic Jews. The incident that drives Cohen is the expulsion of his daughter Heli (Or Lumbrozo) from a Bais Yaakov school, owing to her Sephardic background.The movie opened the 2018 Jerusalem Film Festival.

It also marks Rand's return to cinema after a 15-year absence from the big screen since his previous role in the film Ushpizin.

== Plot ==
The year is 1983. Yaakov Cohen (played by Shuli Rand) is a widower, the owner of a printing press, and a single father. When his daughter Chali (played by Or Lumbrozo) is expelled from her seminary, he becomes outraged by the discrimination and racism within the educational institutions of Beit Yaakov and Agudat Yisrael, as well as the meager budgets allocated to Sephardic schools. Determined to challenge the status quo, he decides to establish a Sephardic ultra-Orthodox political party to run for the Jerusalem mayoral elections, just two months before the election date.

Joining him are two partners: Yigal Vaknin (played by Yoav Levi), a ritual slaughterer and mohel who is a baal teshuva (a secular Jew who returned to religious observance), and Rabbi Moshe Sharvit (played by Yaakov Cohen). None of them have prior political experience. Against all odds, they succeed in securing a seat on the city council. Later, they launch a list for the national Knesset elections, but over time, Cohen finds his position increasingly marginalized.

== Cast ==
Actor Name	Character Name	Comments
Shuli Rand	Yaakov Cohen	
Yaakov Cohen	Rabbi Moshe Sharvit	based on Rabbi Shlomo Dayan
Golan Azulai	Rabbi Toledano	
Yoav Levi	Yigal Vaknin	
Or Lumbrozo	Chali	
Shifi Aloni	Yehudit	
Tsahi Grad	Menachem Moses	
Yigal Naor	Rabbi Ovadia Yosef	
Avraham Zgadon	Rabbi Avraham	
Dorit Lev-Ari	Principal Rivka Blumenthal	
Rivka Gur	Chairwoman of the Hearing Committee	

== Awards ==
=== Awards and nominations ===
Year	Organization	Category	Award	Nominee(s)	Result	References
2019	Ophir Awards Ceremony 2019	Feature Film	Best Feature Film	The Unorthodox	Nomination	[1][2]
2019	Ophir Awards Ceremony 2019	Feature Film	Best Director	Eliran Malka	Nomination	[1][2]
2019	Ophir Awards Ceremony 2019	Feature Film	Best Leading Actor	Shuli Rand	Nomination	[1][2]
2019	Ophir Awards Ceremony 2019	Feature Film	Best Supporting Actor	Yoav Levi	Nomination	[1][2]
2019	Ophir Awards Ceremony 2019	Feature Film	Best Supporting Actress	Shifi Aloni	Nomination	[1][2]
2019	Ophir Awards Ceremony 2019	Feature Film	Best Original Screenplay	Eliran Malka	Nomination	[1][2]
2019	Ophir Awards Ceremony 2019	Feature Film	Best Editing	Eric Lahav Leibovitch	Win	[1][2]
2019	Ophir Awards Ceremony 2019	Feature Film	Best Casting	Michal Koren	Nomination	[1][2]
2019	Ophir Awards Ceremony 2019	Feature Film	Best Soundtrack	Gil Toren, Avi Mizrahi, Vitali Grinshpon	Nomination	[1][2]
2019	Ophir Awards Ceremony 2019	Feature Film	Best Original Music	Ophir Leibovitch	Nomination	[1][2]
2019	Ophir Awards Ceremony 2019	Feature Film	Best Artistic Design	Idan Dolev	Win	[1][2]
2019	Ophir Awards Ceremony 2019	Feature Film	Best Cinematography	Yaron Scharf	Nomination	[1][2]
2019	Ophir Awards Ceremony 2019	Feature Film	Best Makeup	Orly Ronen, Sigalit Grau	Win	[1][2]
2019	Ophir Awards Ceremony 2019	Feature Film	Best Costume Design	Chava Levi Rozelsky	Win	[1][2]

== See also ==
- Shas (political party)
