= In Therapy (French TV series) =

French television drama

- French: En thérapie
- Created by: Éric Toledano; Olivier Nakache
- Based on: BeTipul by: Hagai Levi; Ori Sivan; Nir Bergman
- Starring: Frédéric Pierrot; Mélanie Thierry; Reda Kateb; Céleste Brunnquell; Clémence Poésy; Pio Marmaï; Carole Bouquet; Eye Haïdara; Aliocha Delmotte; Suzanne Lindon; Jacques Weber; Charlotte Gainsbourg
- Country of origin: France
- Original language: French
- No. of series: 2
- No. of episodes: 70

Production
- Running time: 30 minutes

Original release
- Network: Arte
- Release: 4 February 2021 – 19 May 2022

In Therapy (French: En thérapie) is a French drama television series, created by Éric Toledano and Olivier Nakache. The show is based on the Israeli series BeTipul (Hebrew: בטיפול), created by Hagai Levi, Ori Sivan and Nir Bergman.

The series is set after the Bataclan attack in November 2015. Starring Frédéric Pierrot, the series premiered on 28 January 2021 on Arte TV. The series was subtitled and aired in Australia on SBS on Demand under the title In Therapy in November 2021. A second season was aired from April 2022, with each series comprising 35 episodes.

== Cast ==
- Frédéric Pierrot as Dr Philippe Dayan
- Mélanie Thierry as Ariane, a surgeon
- Reda Kateb as Adel, a police officer for the Research and Intervention Brigade
- Céleste Brunnquell as Camille, a champion swimmer who suffered injuries
- Clémence Poésy as Léonora, the wife, then ex, of Damien and mother of Robin
- Pio Marmaï as Damien, the husband, then ex, of Léonora and father of Robin
- Carole Bouquet as Esther, Philippe's therapist
- Eye Haïdara as Inès, a lawyer
- Aliocha Delmotte as Robin, a teenager, son of Léonora and Damien
- Suzanne Lindon as Lydia, a student
- Jacques Weber as Alain, a company manager
- Charlotte Gainsbourg as Claire, Philippe's supervisor who he hopes can help him through his legal troubles

== Episodes ==
Series	Episodes	Originally released	
Series	Episodes	First released	Last released
1	35	4 February 2021	18 March 2021
2	35	7 April 2022	19 May 2022

=== Season 1 (2021) ===
All episodes of season 1 were we made available for streaming on the arte.tv digital platform starting 28 January 2021. The first season was broadcast on Arte starting 4 February 2021, with five episodes broadcast each evening.

List of episodes
Number	Title	Television airing date
1	Ariane – lundi 16 novembre 2015, 9h	4 February 2021
2	Adel – mardi 17 novembre 2015, 10h	4 February 2021
3	Camille – mercredi 18 novembre 2015, 11h	4 February 2021
4	Léonora et Damien – jeudi 19 novembre 2015, 17h	4 February 2021
5	Esther – vendredi 20 novembre 2015, 19h	4 February 2021
6	Ariane – lundi 23 novembre 2015, 9h	11 February 2021
7	Adel – mardi 24 novembre 2015, 10h	11 February 2021
8	Camille – mercredi 25 novembre 2015, 11h	11 February 2021
9	Léonora et Damien – jeudi 26 novembre 2015, 17h	11 February 2021
10	Esther – vendredi 27 novembre 2015, 19h	11 February 2021
11	Ariane – lundi 30 novembre 2015, 9h	18 February 2021
12	Adel – mardi 1er décembre 2015, 10h	18 February 2021
13	Camille – mercredi 2 décembre 2015, 11h	18 February 2021
14	Léonora et Damien – jeudi 3 décembre 2015, 17h	18 February 2021
15	Esther – vendredi 4 décembre 2015, 19h	18 February 2021
16	Ariane – lundi 7 décembre 2015, 9h	25 February 2021
17	Adel – mardi 8 décembre 2015, 10h	25 February 2021
18	Camille – mercredi 9 décembre 2015, 11h	25 February 2021
19	Léonora et Damien – jeudi 10 décembre 2015, 17h	25 February 2021
20	Esther – vendredi 11 décembre 2015, 19h	25 February 2021
21	Ariane – lundi 14 décembre 2015, 9h	4 March 2021
22	Adel – mardi 15 décembre 2015, 10h	4 March 2021
23	Camille – mercredi 16 décembre 2015, 11h	4 March 2021
24	Léonora – jeudi 17 décembre 2015, 17h	4 March 2021
25	Esther – vendredi 18 décembre 2015, 15h	4 March 2021
26	Ariane – lundi 21 décembre 2015, 9h	11 March 2021
27	Adel – mardi 22 décembre 2015, 10h	11 March 2021
28	Camille – mercredi 23 décembre 2015, 11h	11 March 2021
29	Léonora et Damien – jeudi 24 décembre 2015, 17h	11 March 2021
30	Ariane – samedi 2 janvier 2016, 11h	11 March 2021
31	Mohammed Chibane – lundi 4 Janvier 2016, 10h	18 March 2021
32	Esther – mardi 5 janvier 2016, 9h	18 March 2021
33	Camille – mercredi 6 janvier 2016, 11h	18 March 2021
34	Léonora et Damien – jeudi 7 janvier 2016, 17h	18 March 2021
35	Esther – vendredi 8 janvier 2016, 10h	18 March 2021

=== Season 2 (2022) ===
All episodes of season 2 were we made available for streaming on the arte.tv digital platform starting 31 March 2022. The second season was broadcast on Arte starting 7 April 2022, with five episodes broadcast each evening.

List of episodes
Number	Title	Television airing date
1	Inès – lundi 18 mai 2020, 9h	7 April 2022
2	Robin – mardi 19 mai 2020, 17h	7 April 2022
3	Lydia – mercredi 20 mai 2020, 9h	7 April 2022
4	Alain – jeudi 21 mai 2020, 20h	7 April 2022
5	Claire – vendredi 22 mai 2020, 18h	7 April 2022
6	Inès – lundi 25 mai 2020, 7h30	14 April 2022
7	Robin – mardi 26 mai 2020, 17h	14 April 2022
8	Lydia – mercredi 27 mai 2020, 9h	14 April 2022
9	Alain – jeudi 28 mai 2020, 20h	14 April 2022
10	Claire – vendredi 29 mai 2020, 18h	14 April 2022
11	Inès – lundi 1er juin 2020, 7h42	21 April 2022
12	Robin – mardi 2 juin 2020, 17h	21 April 2022
13	Lydia – mercredi 3 juin 2020, 8h15	21 April 2022
14	Alain – jeudi 4 juin 2020, 20h30	21 April 2022
15	Philippe – vendredi 5 juin 2020, 14h	21 April 2022
16	Inès – lundi 8 juin 2020, 7h35	28 April 2022
17	Robin – mardi 9 juin 2020, 17h	28 April 2022
18	Lydia – mercredi 10 juin 2020, 9h	28 April 2022
19	Alain – jeudi 11 juin 2020, 20h	28 April 2022
20	Claire – vendredi 12 juin 2020, 18h	28 April 2022
21	Inès – lundi 22 juin 2020, 7h30	5 May 2022
22	Robin – mardi 23 juin 2020, 15h	5 May 2022
23	Lydia – mercredi 24 juin 2020, 9h	5 May 2022
24	Alain – jeudi 25 juin 2020, 20h	5 May 2022
25	Claire – vendredi 26 juin 2020, 18h	5 May 2022
26	Inès – lundi 29 juin 2020, 7h30	12 May 2022
27	Robin – mardi 30 juin 2020, 17h	12 May 2022
28	Lydia – mercredi 1er juillet 2020, 9h	12 May 2022
29	Alain et Anouk – jeudi 2 juillet 2020, 13h	12 May 2022
30	Claire – vendredi 3 juillet 2020, 18h	12 May 2022
31	Inès – lundi 6 juillet 2020, 7h30	19 May 2022
32	Robin – mardi 7 juillet 2020, 17h	19 May 2022
33	Lydia – mercredi 8 juillet 2020, 9h30	19 May 2022
34	Alain – jeudi 9 juillet 2020, 20h	19 May 2022
35	Claire – vendredi 10 juillet 2020, 18h	19 May 2022

== Reception ==
The show was critically praised by critics. A major success in France, it achieved over 36.5 million views as of 11 March 2021, becoming the most watched series ever released on the Arte digital platform.
