= In Treatment =

American drama television series

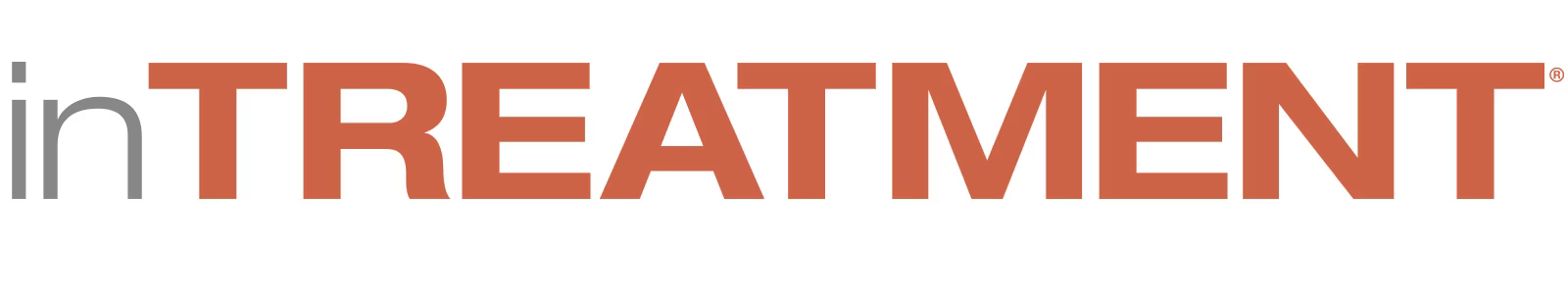
- Genre: Drama
- Based on: BeTipul by: Hagai Levi; Ori Sivan; Nir Bergman
- Developed by: Rodrigo García
- Starring: Gabriel Byrne; Dianne Wiest; Michelle Forbes; Melissa George; Blair Underwood; Mia Wasikowska; Embeth Davidtz; Josh Charles; Hope Davis; Alison Pill; Aaron Shaw; Sherri Saum; Russell Hornsby; John Mahoney; Irrfan Khan; Debra Winger; Dane DeHaan; Amy Ryan; Alex Wolff; Uzo Aduba; Anthony Ramos; John Benjamin Hickey; Quintessa Swindell; Charlayne Woodard; Liza Colón-Zayas
- Theme music composer: Avi Belleli
- Composers: Richard Marvin; Dev Hynes (Season 4)
- Country of origin: United States
- Original language: English
- No. of seasons: 4
- No. of episodes: 130 (list of episodes)

Production
- Executive producers: Rodrigo García; Stephen Levinson; Hagai Levi; Mark Wahlberg; Warren Leight; Paris Barclay; Dan Futterman; Anya Epstein; Noa Tishby; Jennifer Schuur; Joshua Allen; Melissa Bernstein; Julian Farino
- Production locations: Los Angeles (seasons 1, 4); New York City (seasons 2–3)
- Running time: 22–30 minutes
- Production companies: Leverage Management; Closest to the Hole Productions; Sheleg; Woman of Letters (Season 4)

Original release
- Network: HBO
- Release: January 28, 2008 – December 7, 2010
- Release: May 23 – June 28, 2021

In Treatment is an American drama television series for HBO, produced and developed by Rodrigo Garcia, based on the Israeli series BeTipul (Hebrew: בטיפול), created by Hagai Levi, Ori Sivan and Nir Bergman.

The series follows a psychotherapist, Paul Weston, in his 50s, and his weekly sessions with patients, as well as those with his own therapist at the end of the week. The program, which stars Gabriel Byrne as Paul, debuted on January 28, 2008, as a five-night-a-week series. Its executive producer and principal director was Paris Barclay, who directed 35 episodes, the most of any director on the series, and the only one to direct episodes in all three seasons. The program's format, script and opening theme are based on, and are often verbatim translations of BeTipul. HBO Canada aired the program simultaneously with HBO in the U.S. Season 1 earned numerous honors, including Emmy, Golden Globe and Writers Guild awards.

The series was renewed for a second season on June 20, 2008, and production on Season 2 wrapped in early 2009. According to The New York Times, production relocated to New York City from Los Angeles at the insistence of Byrne, who otherwise threatened to resign. The move and the addition of Sunday night to the schedule were considered votes of confidence in the series by HBO executives. Season 2 premiered on April 5, 2009. The second season built on the success of the first, winning a 2009 Peabody Award. The third season premiered on October 26, 2010, for a seven-week run, with four episodes per week. The 24-episode fourth season premiered on May 23, 2021, and aired four episodes weekly, with Uzo Aduba taking over as the series lead Dr. Brooke Taylor.

In February 2022, HBO confirmed that the show would not return again.

== Plot ==
Psychotherapist Paul Weston has a private practice where he carries out sessions with his patients in his Baltimore home. He begins to question his own abilities and motives, so he seeks help from his former mentor and therapist Gina Toll, whom he has not seen for ten years.

== Characters ==
=== Paul Weston ===
Gabriel Byrne portrays Paul Weston, a charming, relentless psychologist, who is seeking a peaceful existence, free of self-doubt and ambivalence. He is a graduate of Georgetown University, where he earned his undergraduate degree, Columbia University, where he earned a master's degree, and The New School, where he received his PhD (though a season one scene shows two diplomas from the University of Pennsylvania displayed near the door to Paul's office). In summer 1988, he moved to Maryland, where he worked at the Washington–Baltimore Psychoanalytic Institute and later established his private practice in Baltimore.

=== Gina Toll ===
Dianne Wiest portrays psychotherapist Gina Toll, Paul's former mentor and clinical supervisor whom Paul avoided for nine years after an argument over reservations Gina expressed in a letter of recommendation on Paul's behalf. She acts as a sounding board for Paul's doubts about his motives and abilities.

== Episodes ==
Season	Episodes	Originally released	
Season	Episodes	First released	Last released
1	43	January 28, 2008	March 28, 2008
2	35	April 5, 2009	May 5, 2009
3	28	October 25, 2010	December 7, 2010
4	24	May 23, 2021	June 28, 2021

Each episode of In Treatment focuses on one patient, including Paul, who is seeing his clinical supervisor and psychotherapist, Gina.

=== Season 1 ===
Therapy patient Laura professes her love for Paul, which causes their relationship to grow more complex and difficult to control. Laura's personal issues include being seduced by a much older man when she was a teenager. She begins an unsatisfying sexual relationship with Alex, another of Paul’s patients. Paul reflects on his own feelings for her and believes that he is in love with her; sessions with Gina fail to resolve his inner conflict over his desire and professional responsibility. Midway through the season, Laura ends her therapy with Paul after he continues to reject her advances. Paul and Laura encounter each other at Alex's funeral, and Paul decides to pursue Laura at the risk of destroying his marriage, but a panic attack prevents him from going through with it.

A fighter pilot who finds it impossible to express his internal struggles, Alex meets Laura and has a brief affair with her. Paul tries to get Alex to break through to his reasons for running himself to exhaustion and examine his feelings about killing Iraqi schoolchildren during a sanctioned mission. Alex drifts into instability, eventually deciding to end his therapy, and returns to the military just as Paul begins to make progress with Alex's repressed insecurities. Alex is killed during a training exercise, and although his death is ruled an accident, some indications suggest that Alex's death was a suicidal reaction caused by the trauma of therapeutic reflection.

Sophie's ambivalence about life is elicited and broken down by Paul, who examines her underage sexual relationship with her much older gymnastics coach, Cy, and its effects on her, in addition to her conflicted feelings about her divorced parents and her father's distance from her. Eventually, Sophie benefits greatly from the therapy and begins to repair her relationship with her parents. At the end of the season, Sophie leaves Baltimore to pursue further gymnastic training in Denver.

Jake and Amy's debate about whether she should have an abortion is the prologue to what is revealed to be an extremely volatile, dysfunctional relationship. During their second session, Amy has a miscarriage, but the couple return to therapy to work on their issues. Amy's inability to hold emotional connection leads her to have an affair with her boss, a man she finds "gross" but uses as a buffer against Jake. Jake and Amy each have an individual session, and finally and sadly decide to end their marriage and share custody of their son. Jake believes the therapy was helpful, but Amy thinks it hurt their marriage.

Throughout the season, Gina and Paul confront each other over issues in their shared history and opposing views, but by the finale Paul realizes he needs her input and agrees to continue therapy.

The first season consists of 43 episodes, with each episode airing on its allotted day of the week, Monday to Friday. The episodes were spread over nine weeks for most of the characters, except in the final week, which did not have Monday or Tuesday installments.

Main Characters
Actor	Character	Weekday	Role
Gabriel Byrne	Paul Weston	Various	Paul is a 50-something psychologist who has weekly sessions with patients and his former mentor Gina.
Melissa George	Laura Hill	Monday	Laura is an anesthesiologist who is erotically fixated on Paul.
Blair Underwood	Alex Prince	Tuesday	Alex is a fighter pilot traumatized by a bombing mission in Iraq that had unintended consequences.
Mia Wasikowska	Sophie	Wednesday	Sophie is a suicidal, teenage gymnast.
Embeth Davidtz; Josh Charles	Amy; Jake	Thursday	Amy and Jake initially commence couples' therapy because of their conflict over whether or not to end her pregnancy.
Dianne Wiest	Gina Toll	Friday	Gina is Paul's former therapist and mentor who plays devil's advocate to his ambivalence.
Michelle Forbes	Kate Weston	Various	Paul's wife who later attends Paul's sessions with Gina
Supporting Characters
Actor	Character	Weekday	Role
Jake Richardson	Ian	Various	Paul and Kate's 20-year-old son
Mae Whitman	Rosie	Various	Paul and Kate's 16-year-old daughter
Max Burkholder	Max	Various	Paul and Kate's youngest son
Peter Horton	Zack	Various	Sophie's father
Julia Campbell	Olivia	Various	Sophie's mother
Glynn Turman	Alex Prince, Sr.	Various	Alex's father

=== Season 2 ===
Paul, now divorced and quite lonely, has moved to Brooklyn, and uses the living room of his small refurbished walk-up brownstone for patient visits. Alex's father, Alex Sr., serves him with a malpractice lawsuit in the first episode, and he becomes preoccupied with it.

Alex Sr. sues Paul for negligence, charging him with failing to prevent the death of his son, who voluntarily discontinued therapy and was killed in a plane crash that was either an accident or suicide. Alex Sr. and his lawyers contend that Paul's professional responsibility was to contact the military and report Alex Jr. unfit for duty. Alex Sr. later meets with Paul and makes a loaded offer: if Paul writes a letter taking blame for Alex Jr.'s death, he will drop the lawsuit, satisfied to have his belief that Paul is 100% at fault confirmed. Paul considers the offer but later concurs with Gina's advice and rejects it. The lawsuit is dismissed as frivolous, and Paul's angst about his professional competence is at least temporarily alleviated.

The season had seven episodes for each character. The Monday and Tuesday sessions aired back-to-back on Sundays, while the remaining three ran on Mondays. HBO repeated the episodes in sequence, several times each week. The season's executive producer was Warren Leight, who previously worked on Law and Order: Criminal Intent.

Actor	Character	Weekday	Role
Hope Davis	Mia Nesky	Monday	Mia is a successful malpractice attorney and former patient of Paul's from 20 years ago. She blames him for her present status: an unmarried, childless workaholic, who makes poor choices in men.
Alison Pill	April	Tuesday	April is a Pratt Institute architecture student diagnosed with lymphoma which she has been concealing from everyone but Paul. She is in denial about the severity of her illness.
Aaron Shaw; Sherri Saum; Russell Hornsby	Oliver; Bess; Luke	Wednesday	Oliver is the 12-year-old son of Bess and Luke, a divorcing couple who claim to love their son but are intent in pursuing their own goals. Oliver is caught in the middle and blames himself for his family's chaos.
John Mahoney	Walter Barnett	Thursday	Walter is a self-confident CEO with a history of panic attacks, who finds his life is becoming overwhelming.
Dianne Wiest	Gina Toll	Friday	Gina is Paul's own therapist and mentor who diligently tries to guide Paul away from a mid-life crisis and down the road to personal satisfaction and validation.
Glynn Turman	Alex Prince Sr.	Various	Alex Sr. sues Paul for negligence, over failing to prevent the death of his son Alex Jr., a former patient, seen in season one, who died after discontinuing sessions with Paul.
Laila Robins	Tammy Kent	Various	Tammy is Paul's first girlfriend and, coincidentally, a patient of Gina's.

=== Season 3 ===
After the final episode of the second season, Leight said in an interview that a third season remained possible, but that the show had been exhausting for everyone involved and also something less than a "breakout hit" for HBO. On October 23, 2009, HBO announced that it had picked up In Treatment for a third season. Production began in early 2010 for a premiere in late October.

The third season is the first not based on the original Israeli series Be'Tipul, which had only two. The format is similar: each week, a series of patients visit Paul in half-hour episodes, while in the last, Paul visits his own therapist, Adele Brouse.

There are only three patients this season. Paul still lives in Cobble Hill, Brooklyn and has a young girlfriend, Wendy.

On Mondays, Paul sees Sunil, a widower transported to New York from Calcutta after his wife's death to live with his son, his son's wife, and their two young children.

Tuesday's patient is Frances, a self-described successful actress who has returned to the stage but has difficulty remembering her lines. She is also coping with a dying sister, a broken marriage and a scornful teenage daughter.

On Wednesdays, Paul sees Jesse, a high school student who believes his adopted parents hate him because he is gay.

Paul eventually reenters therapy with the young psychoanalyst Adele Brouse, initially seeking a prescription for sleep medication. Adele perceives that lack of sleep is not his real problem.

The show remains set in Paul's apartment. Unlike the first two seasons, the third season has only four episodes per week. The show aired on Mondays and Tuesdays and, like season 2, had seven weeks of sessions.

Main Characters
Actor	Character	Weekday	Role
Irrfan Khan	Sunil	Monday	After his wife's death, 52-year-old Sunil emigrated to the U.S. from Calcutta to live with his son and daughter-in-law. He is deeply depressed about his wife's death and angry at what he sees as his daughter-in-law's insensitivity. Sunil talks to Paul even though psychotherapy is stigmatized in his culture.
Debra Winger	Frances	Tuesday	A successful actress, Frances comes to see Paul because she is having trouble remembering her lines. Meanwhile, she is troubled that her sister has breast cancer like her mother, and fears that she is next.
Dane DeHaan	Jesse	Wednesday	A gay teenager living with his adoptive parents, Jesse harbors significant anger toward them and himself. He is by turns aggressive, capriciously manipulative, fearful, abrasive and vulnerable, and has been peddling prescription drugs and sleeping with older men. Jesse's world turns upside down when he receives a call from his birth mother, with whom he has not had contact since infancy.
Amy Ryan	Adele Brouse	Friday	A young psychoanalyst recommended by a neurologist friend of Paul's to prescribe him sleep medication, Adele raises questions about Paul's view of his life, particularly his relationship with Gina Toll. Despite initial reluctance, Paul comes to respect Adele as a therapist.
Supporting Characters
Actor	Character	Weekday	Role
Alex Wolff	Max	Various	Paul's youngest son who leaves his mother's house in Baltimore to move in with Paul.
James Lloyd Reynolds	Steve	Various	Kate's new fiancé and Max's future stepfather, of whom Paul is initially jealous.
Susan Misner	Wendy	Various	Paul's girlfriend.
Samrat Chakrabarti	Arun	Monday	Sunil's son who is housing his father and enrolls him in therapy to help him through his grief.
Sonya Walger	Julia	Monday	Arun's wife and Sunil's daughter-in-law who disapproves of Sunil's behavior at home
Dendrie Taylor	Marisa	Wednesday	Jesse's adoptive mother.
Joseph Siravo	Roberto	Wednesday	Jesse's adopted father.

On March 30, 2011, HBO said In Treatment would not continue in its existing form but might continue in a different format.

=== Season 4 ===
In July 2020, it was reported that HBO was developing a reboot of the series. In October 2020, HBO confirmed the revival and production began in late 2020. The 24-episode season premiered on May 23, 2021, on HBO and HBO Max. Jennifer Schuur and Joshua Allen are the fourth season's co-showrunners.

==== Main cast ====
- Uzo Aduba as Dr. Brooke Taylor, a therapist
- Anthony Ramos as Eladio Restrepo, Brooke's patient who works as a home health aide for a wealthy family
- John Benjamin Hickey as Colin, Brooke's patient who is a white-collar criminal recently released from prison
- Quintessa Swindell as Laila, Brooke's patient who is a rebellious teenager
- Charlayne Woodard as Rhonda, Laila's grandmother
- Liza Colón-Zayas as Rita, Brooke's AA sponsor

==== Recurring cast ====
- Joel Kinnaman as Adam, Brooke's longtime on-again, off-again boyfriend

== Critical response ==
The series was generally well-received, attaining positive reviews. On the review aggregator website Metacritic, the first season scored 70/100, the second 85/100, the third 83/100, and the fourth 72/100.

On Rotten Tomatoes, the first season has a 78% approval rating with an average score of 6.1/10 based on 36 reviews; the critical consensus reads, "In Treatment has finely-written scripts that develop with raw emotion while unspooling engrossing suspense." The second season has a 100% approval rating with an average score of 8.9/10 based on 19 reviews; the critical consensus reads, "In Treatment continues to hone[sic] in on its characters in the second season, allowing the cast to find more nuances in their performances." The third season has an 87% approval rating with an average score of 8.6/10 based on 23 reviews; the critical consensus reads, "In Treatment offers some of the tightest dramatic writing and purest performances on television." The fourth season has a 96% approval rating with an average score of 7.5/10 based on 25 reviews; the critical consensus reads, "In Treatment returns with a solid fourth season that captures the spirit of the original while giving its new ensemble—led by an outstanding Uzo Aduba—plenty of room to shine.

The Los Angeles Times's Mary McNamara called In Treatment "cleverly conceived," well-written and -acted, but "stagey" and "strain[ing]... believability". Variety's Brian Lowry deemed it "more interesting structurally than in its execution". On Slate, Troy Patterson found it tiresome for its "nattering" and "ambitious hogwash". In Entertainment Weekly, Ken Tucker gave it a "B+", with "lots of great soapy intrigue". The New York Times wrote, "In Treatment [...] is hypnotic, mostly because it withholds information as intelligently as it reveals it. [...] The half-hour episodes are addictive, and few viewers are likely to be satisfied with just one session at a time. [...] In Treatment provides an irresistible peek at the psychopathology of everyday life—on someone else's tab."

== Awards and nominations ==
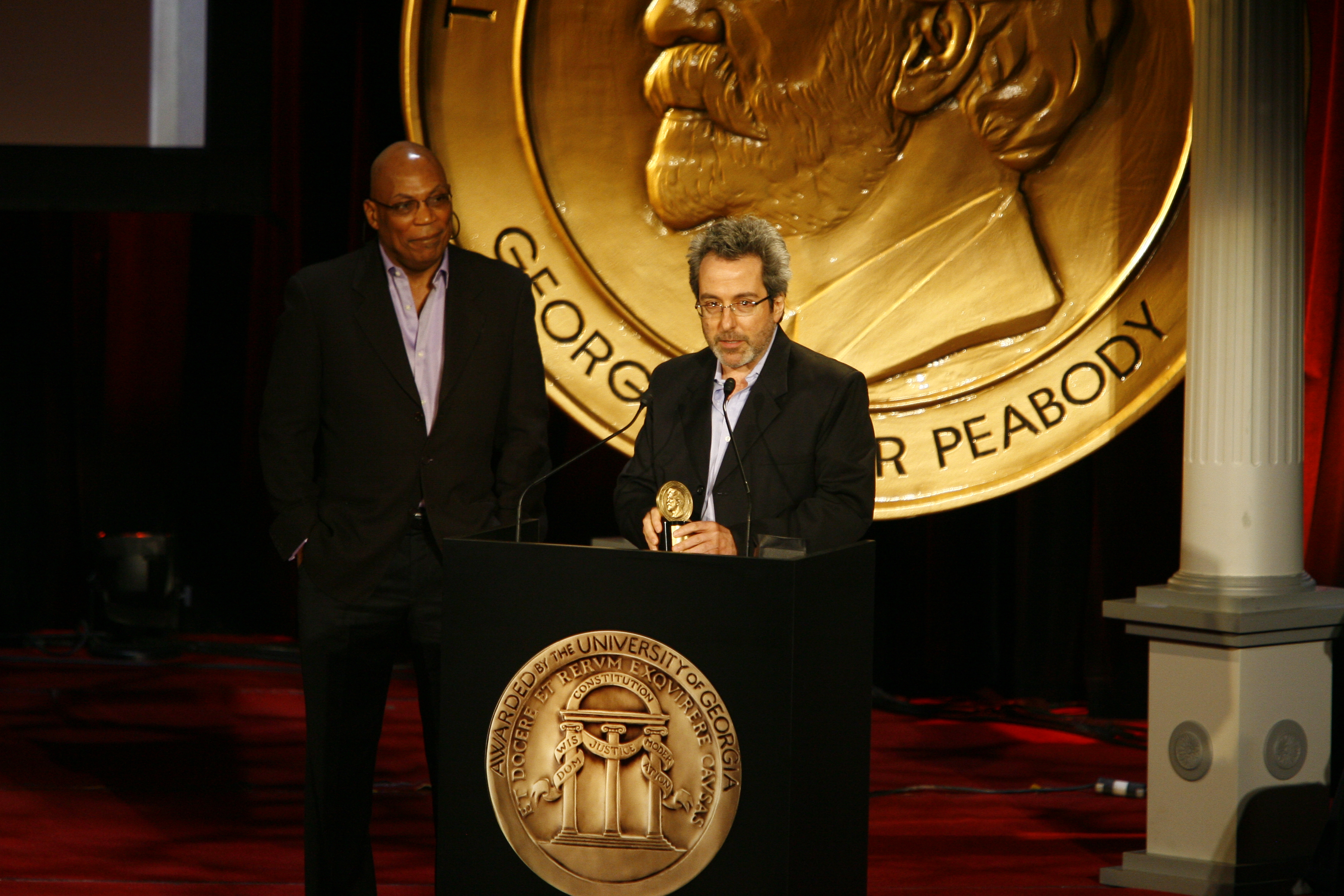
Paris Barclay and Warren Leight at the 69th Annual Peabody Awards for In Treatment

- 60th Primetime Emmy Awards:
  - Won – Outstanding Supporting Actress in a Drama Series (Dianne Wiest)
  - Won – Outstanding Guest Actor in a Drama Series (Glynn Turman)
  - Nominated – Outstanding Lead Actor in a Drama Series (Gabriel Byrne)
  - Nominated – Outstanding Cinematography for a Half-Hour Series (Fred Murphy): Week 6: Sophie
- 61st Primetime Emmy Awards:
  - Nominated – Outstanding Lead Actor in a Drama Series (Gabriel Byrne)
  - Nominated – Outstanding Supporting Actress in a Drama Series (Hope Davis)
  - Nominated – Outstanding Supporting Actress in a Drama Series (Dianne Wiest)
- 73rd Primetime Emmy Awards:
  - Nominated – Outstanding Lead Actress in a Drama Series (Uzo Aduba – Episode: "Week 5: Brooke")
- 66th Golden Globe Awards:
  - Won – Best Lead Actor in a Drama Series (Gabriel Byrne)
  - Nominated – Best Television Series - Drama
  - Nominated – Best Supporting Actress in a Series, Miniseries, or TV Film (Dianne Wiest)
  - Nominated – Best Supporting Actress in a Series, Miniseries, or TV Film (Melissa George)
  - Nominated – Best Supporting Actor in a Series, Miniseries, or TV Film (Blair Underwood)
- 79th Golden Globe Awards:
  - Nominated – Best Lead Actress in a Drama Series (Uzo Aduba)
- Satellite Awards 2008:
  - Nominated – Best Drama Series
  - Nominated – Best Actor in a Drama Series (Gabriel Byrne)
  - Nominated – Best Supporting Actress in a Series, Miniseries, or TV Film (Dianne Wiest)
- Satellite Awards 2009:
  - Nominated – Best Drama Series
  - Nominated – Best Actor in a Drama Series (Gabriel Byrne)
- Directors Guild of America Awards 2008:
  - Nominated – Outstanding Directorial Achievement in Dramatic Series (Paris Barclay - Episode: "Week 8: Alex")
- Directors Guild of America Awards 2009:
  - Nominated – Outstanding Directorial Achievement in Dramatic Series (Paris Barclay - Episode: "Week 4: Gina")
- Writers Guild of America Awards 2008:
  - Won – New Series (Rodrigo García, Bryan Goluboff, Davey Holmes, William Meritt Johnson, Amy Lippman, and Sarah Treem)
- 2008 AFI Awards:
  - Top 10 Best Television Programs of 2008
- 2009 Peabody Award
