= The Investigation Must Go On =

- DVD cover
- הבולשת חוקרת
- Directed by: Marek Rozenbaum
- Written by: Haim Marin
- Produced by: Marek Rozenbaum
- Starring: Haim Renan; Assi Levy; Osnat Fishman; David Danino; Eyal Rozales; Moshe Ivgy; Marek Rozenbaum; Aki Avni
- Cinematography: Valentin Belonogov
- Edited by: Anat Lubarsky
- Music by: Efi Shoshani
- Production company: Transfax Film Productions Ltd
- Release date: 12 October 2000
- Running time: 94 minutes
- Country: Israel
- Language: Hebrew

The Investigation Must Go On (Hebrew: הבולשת חוקרת, translit. Haboleshet Hokeret) is a 2000 Israeli drama film directed by Marek Rozenbaum, which was nominated for 8 Israeli Film Academy Awards.

This was Rozenbaum's feature directorial debut.

== Plot ==
Police investigator Micha Stein receives a tip that a singer, Shalom Shalom, is responsible for a recent robbery. Stein, who is excessively ambitious, arrests Shalom. A cat-and-mouse follows with two equally stubborn men playing off the contradictions of the characters. A wedding photographer with a crush on Shalom, Shalom's unconventional relationship with his wife, his line of work, his sliding moral compass all work against the inflexible Stein, who becomes captivated by Shalom's wife.

== Cast ==
- Haim Renan as Momi
- Assi Levy as Silvia
- Osnat Fishman as Zohar Shalom
- David Danino as Captain George Ohana
- Eyal Rozales as Robby
- Moshe Ivgy as Shalom Shalom
- Marek Rozenbaum
- Aki Avni as Lt. Micha Shtein

== Reception ==
Nominated for 8 Israeli film awards and won a 2000 Wolgin Writing Prize.
