= The Road to Where =

2016 Israeli historical drama film

- הדרך לאן
- Directed by: Michal Bat-Adam
- Written by: Michal Ben-Adam
- Produced by: Michal Bat-Adam; Renana Levi; Moshé Mizrahi; Moshe Edery; Leon Edery; Yigal Sade
- Starring: Ishai Golan
- Cinematography: Yoav Kosh
- Edited by: Michal Ben-Adam
- Music by: Daniel Mizrahi; Gil Toren
- Release dates: 22 October 2016 (Haifa); 2 November 2017 (Israel)
- Running time: 96 minutes
- Country: Israel
- Languages: Hebrew; Arabic

The Road to Where (Hebrew: הדרך לאן, tr. Hadereh Lean) is a 2016 independent Israeli drama film, written and directed by Michal Bat-Adam.

== Synopsis ==
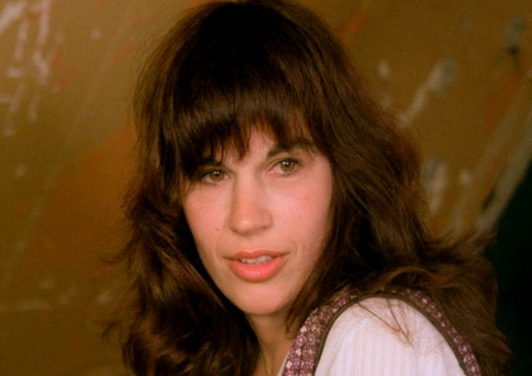
Michal Bat-Adam in 1984 (Photographers: Nurith Aviv and Akiva Tevet)

Set in Israel in the aftermath of the 1948 Palestinian expulsion and flight, the film tells of a house by the sea in Tel Aviv-Yafo, from which Arabs have had to flee in haste, which becomes the home of Jewish survivors who managed to escape the inferno in Europe. It deals with the turmoil of their existence, under the shadow of the unresolved conflict between Jews and Arabs.

== Cast ==
- Ishai Golan as Avi
- Sharon Alexander as Nahum
- Nati Amos, Yafit Asulin as Tsipi
- Lana Ettinger as Eti
- Hila Feldman as Edit
- Sigalit Fuchs as Dvora
- Itzik Golan as Asher
- Shiri Golan as Gitta
- Leah Kamhazi as Pnina
- Aki Avni
- Nir Strauss
- Tarik Kopty
- Liat Goren
- Osnat Fishman
- Moshé Mizrahi
- Davit Gavish
- Gabi Eldor

== Production ==
In addition to music by Ludwig van Beethoven and Wolfgang Amadeus Mozart, it was conducted by Otto Klemperer), and was financed by the Israel Film Fund, Yes’s Yes Israeli Cinema, and the Ministry of Culture and Sport.

== Release ==
The film premiered on 22 October 2016 at the Haifa International Film Festival and was released to the public on 6 September 2017 as part of Israeli Cinema Day (general release followed on 2 November 2017).

== Reception ==
Journalist Dr. Shmuel Duvdevani opined that “the film is filled with a great many wonderful cinematic moments,” while fellow journalist Uri Klein largely dismissed the “lack of proper cinematic tools,” and fellow journalist Meir Schnitzer awarded it three out of five stars. The film was released on DVD on 19 June 2018. The Film Review Council has rated this film as being appropriate for all audiences. It is estimated that only around 3,000 tickets were sold domestically, though the film was nominated for several awards at the 2017 Ophir Awards.
