= Osnat Fishman =

Israeli actress (born 1972)

- אסנת פישמן
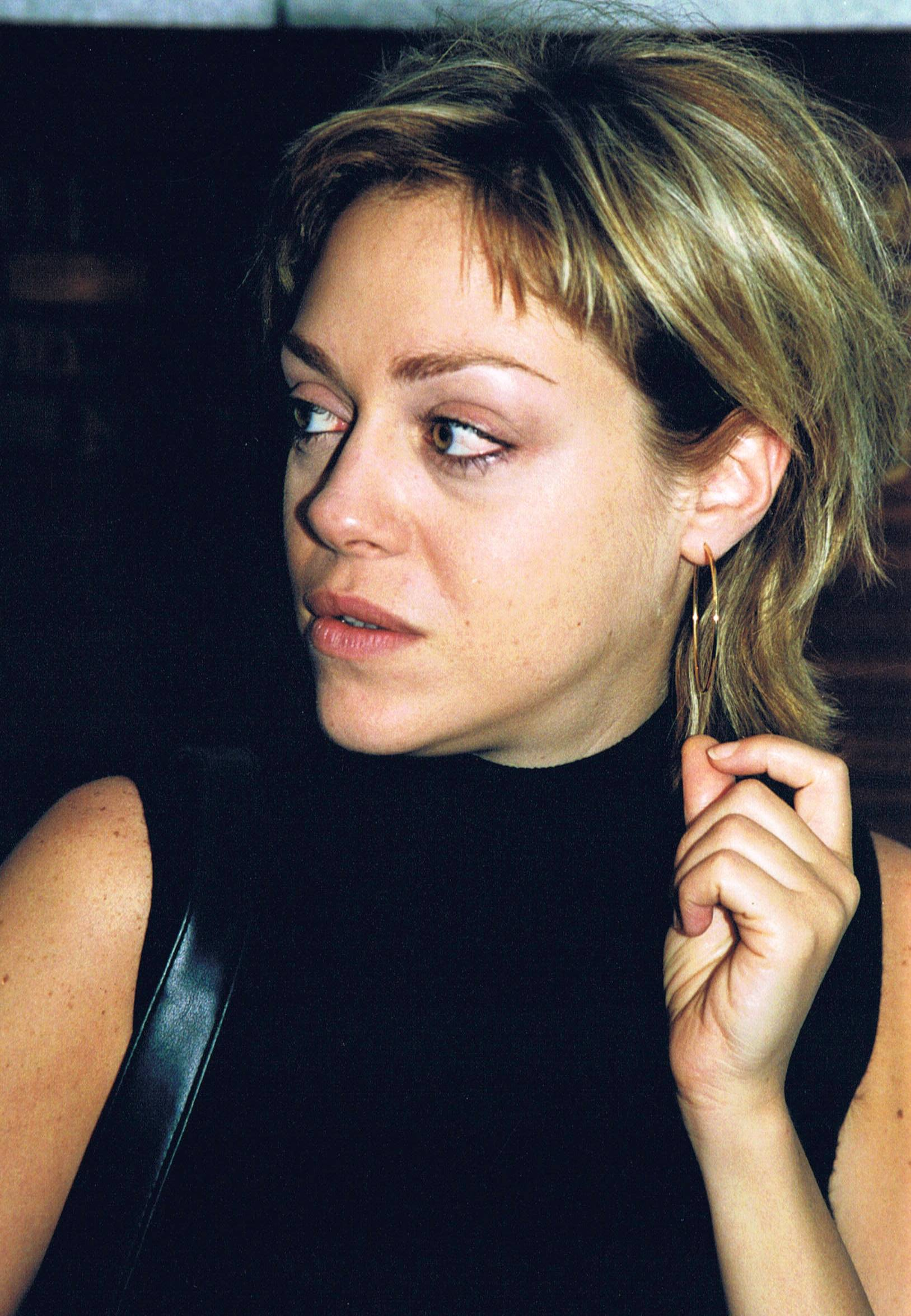
- Born: 25 March 1972 (age 54); Tel Aviv, Israel
- Education: Beit Zvi School for the Performing Arts
- Occupation: Actress
- Years active: 1995–present
- Children: 2

Osnat Fishman (Hebrew: אסנת פישמן; born 25 March 1972) is an Israeli actress of film, television, and stage. She is a graduate of the Beit Zvi School for the Performing Arts.

== Biography ==
Fishman grew up in Ramat Hasharon, and during her studies at Beit Zvi she received various scholarships. She performed at the Cameri Theater and the Habima Theater.

== Filmography ==
- The Investigation Must Go On
- The Road to Where
