= Broken Wings (2002 film) =

- Theatrical Poster
- כנפיים שבורות
- Directed by: Nir Bergman
- Written by: Nir Bergman
- Produced by: Assaf Amir
- Starring: Orly Silbersatz Banai; Maya Maron; Nitai Gaviratz
- Cinematography: Valentin Belonogov
- Music by: Avi Belleli
- Release date: October 24, 2002
- Running time: 87 minutes
- Country: Israel
- Language: Hebrew

Broken Wings (Hebrew: כנפיים שבורות / Knafayim Shvurot) is a 2002 Israeli film directed by Nir Bergman and starring Orly Silbersatz Banai, Maya Maron, and Nitai Gaviratz.

The plot follows a mother and her four children from Haifa, each coping in their own way with the unexpected death of their father.

The film achieved great success both in Israel and internationally and is considered one of the most successful Israeli films ever. It was screened in the United States, France, the United Kingdom, and 20 other countries. In its release year, the film won multiple Ophir Awards for artistic design, cinematography, directing, editing, screenplay, soundtrack, acting (Maya Maron and Orly Silbersatz Banai), and for Best Picture. It participated in and won awards at the Berlin Film Festival, Jerusalem Film Festival, Palm Springs Film Festival, and Tokyo Film Festival.

The film's theme song is "Animated Movies" recorded by Maya Maron. The film's soundtrack was released by Helicon Records.

== Plot ==
The unexpected death of the family patriarch throws every member of the Ullmann clan off course. Widow Dafna takes to bed for three months and when she finally returns to her job at the maternity hospital, she has little time for her children. Eldest son, Yair drops out of school and adopts a fatalist attitude, shutting out his siblings and girlfriend. His twin sister Maya, a talented musician, feels the most guilt and is forced to act as a family caregiver at the expense of career opportunities. Bullied at school, younger son Ido responds by obsessively filming himself with a video camera and attempting dangerous feats. The baby sister, Bar, is woefully neglected. Preoccupied with their own misery, the family is barely a family anymore. When another tragedy strikes, will they be able to support one another?

== Reception ==
Variety called it "a strongly emotional experience despite its tendency toward cryptic dramatics."
