= Valentin Belonogov =

Soviet and Israeli cinematographer (1949–2024)

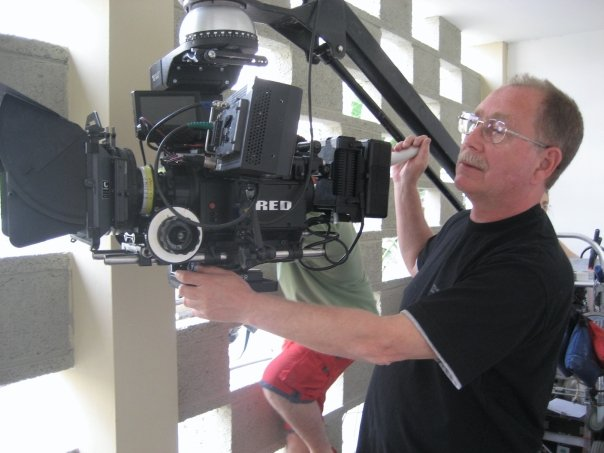
- Filming of the movie "WARNING!" (2008)
- Born: 4 January 1949; Izberbash, Russian SFSR, Soviet Union
- Died: 30 October 2024 (aged 75); Tel Aviv, Israel
- Education: VGIK
- Occupation: Cinematographer
- Years active: 1970–2022
- Notable work: Yana's Friends, Circus Palestine, The Investigation Must Go On, Broken Wings
- Awards: Ophir Award for Best Cinematography (1999, 2002)

Valentin Belonogov (1949–2024) was a Soviet and Israeli cinematographer, member of the Union of Cinematographers of the USSR (since 1978), member of the Union of Cinematographers of Israel and the Israeli Film Academy, and two-time winner of the Ophir Award.

== Early life and education ==
Belonogov was born on 4 January 1949 in Izberbash, in the Dagestan ASSR of the Soviet Union, into a family of Second World War veterans. He grew up on the Caspian coast and developed an early interest in photography and cinematography while still at school, shooting short items for local television in Dagestan.

In 1975 he graduated from the cinematography faculty of the Gerasimov Institute of Cinematography (VGIK) in Moscow, where he studied in the workshop of professor Boris Volchek.

== Career ==
=== Soviet period ===
While still a student Belonogov shot documentary films in Dagestan, including Zhizn' prozhitaya nabelo. Efendi Kapiev. Dagestan (A Life Lived in White. Efendi Kapiev. Dagestan, 1970).

From the mid-1970s he worked as a staff cinematographer at the Chișinău-based studio Moldova-Film, where he shot a number of feature and television films. His Soviet-era work includes the crime film Agent of the Secret Service (1978), the musical drama Where Are You, Love? (1980), the historical adventure Tainele prizonierului (The Mysterious Prisoner, 1986) and the co-production Gobsek (1987), based on the novel by Honoré de Balzac.

=== Work in Israel ===
Belonogov immigrated from the Soviet Union to Israel at the age of 41 and continued his career there as a cinematographer on feature, documentary and television productions. One of his first Israeli projects as director of photography was Leonid Gorovets’s Russian-language drama Cafe with Lemon (Café im limon, 1994). He subsequently shot the cult fantasy drama Clara Hakedosha (Saint Clara) (1996), the television film Mazal Dagim (Pisces, 1998) and a number of other Israeli productions.

In 1999 Belonogov was director of photography on Arik Kaplun’s tragicomedy Yana's Friends, about immigrants in Tel Aviv during the Gulf War. Three years later he shot Nir Bergman’s family drama Broken Wings, whose visual style was widely praised by critics for its expressive use of light and shadow. Both films became landmarks of Israeli cinema and brought him national recognition.

Belonogov also worked extensively in television and on low-budget features. His later Israeli credits include Circus Palestine (1998), No Names on the Doors (1997), Something Good Will Happen to You (2005), Letters to America (2006), Things Behind the Sun (2006), To Dance (2006), Etsba Elohim (The Finger of God) (2008) and the crime film The Investigation Must Go On (2000).

Outside his work on set, Belonogov taught cinematography at the film and television department of Tel Aviv University and at the Sapir Academic College, mentoring a younger generation of Israeli filmmakers. In the 2010s he also worked as a television cameraman for the Russian-language Israeli Channel 9.

== Style and critical reception ==
Critics described Belonogov’s cinematography as both sensitive and powerful, noting his ability to use light and framing to convey psychological states of the characters and the emotional atmosphere of a scene. In assessments of Broken Wings, reviewers singled out his work for its nuanced use of naturalistic lighting and the way the camera confines the characters within the cramped apartment space, visually reflecting the family’s grief and sense of entrapment.

== Awards and honours ==
Belonogov received numerous honours in both the Soviet Union and Israel. In 1994 he was awarded the "Golden Lens" prize named after cinematographer Gadi Danzig by the Israeli Guild of Film and Television Workers for his work on Cafe with Lemon.

He won the Ophir Award for Best Cinematography twice, for Saint Clare(1996), Yana's Friends (1999) and Broken Wings (2002), and received additional Ophir nominations for Circus Palestina (1998), Something Good Will Happen to You (2005) and Etzba Elohim (Finger of God, 2008). His work on Etzba Elohim also received recognition at the Jerusalem Film Festival.

== Personal life ==
Belonogov was married to Tonya Belonogova; the couple had one daughter, Miri, and three grandchildren. He died of cancer in Tel Aviv on 30 October 2024, at the age of 75, and was buried at Yarkon Cemetery.

== Selected filmography ==
- Zhizn' prozhitaya nabelo. Efendi Kapiev. Dagestan (1970) – documentary, director of photography
- Agent of the Secret Service (1978) – feature film, director of photography
- Where Are You, Love? (1980) – feature film, director of photography
- The Mysterious Prisoner (1986) – feature film, director of photography
- Cafe with Lemon (1994) – feature film, director of photography
- Clara Hakedosha (Saint Clara) (1996) – feature film, director of photography
- Kitzur Toldot Ha-ohavim (A Short History of Lovers, 1997) – feature film, director of photography
- No Names on the Doors (1997) – feature film, director of photography
- Circus Palestine (1998) – feature film, director of photography
- Mazal Dagim (Pisces, 1998) – television film, director of photography
- Yana's Friends (1999) – feature film, director of photography
- The Investigation Must Go On (2000) – feature film, director of photography
- Ras Pina (2001) – feature film, director of photography
- Broken Wings (2002) – feature film, director of photography
- Lirkod (2006) – feature film, director of photography
- Something Good Will Happen to You (2005) – feature film, director of photography
- Letters to America (2006) – feature film, director of photography
- The Secrets Behind the Sun (2006) – feature film, director of photography
- Etsba Elohim (Finger of God) (2008) – feature film, director of photography
