= Maktub (2017 film) =

- Directed by: Oded Raz
- Written by: Guy Amir; Hanan Savyon
- Starring: Guy Amir; Hanan Savyon; Gal Amitai; Igal Naor
- Production company: Firma Films
- Distributed by: Netflix
- Release dates: 6 September 2017 (Israeli Cinema Day); 16 June 2018
- Running time: 100 minutes
- Country: Israel
- Language: Hebrew

Maktub is a 2017 Israeli comedy film directed by Oded Raz and co-written by Guy Amir and Hanan Savyon, the latter two also starring in it. The plot revolves around two gangsters, Steve (Hanan Savyon) and Chuma (Guy Amir) attempt to fulfill wishes they find at the Western Wall.

== Plot ==
Steve and Chuma are mobsters who collect sponsorship fees. The two miraculously survive a terrorist bombing in a restaurant, after which Chuma insists they have been spared by divine intervention.

The pair heads to the Western Wall to pray. Steve takes a note left in the Wall to write on to communicate with Chuma, who is temporarily deaf from the explosion. The pair later reads the note's original message, written by a lonely boy being raised by his single mother who cannot afford a bar mitzvah for her son, and decide they have been chosen by G-d to answer prayers left in the Western Wall.

Steve and Chuma meet with Boris, the lonely boy from the note, where they falsely claim his mother has won a lottery for hosting a bar mitzvah. Chuma also meets with Avishar, who Steve denies is his own son.

The second note read by the pair is from a woman Bruria wishing for a child. She and her husband have been unsuccessful in having a baby. Chuma and Steve set up a phony car accident in which Bruria is instructed to go to a hospital, where she ostensibly finds a fertility doctor by coincidence. It is determined that her husband may be infertile.

Chuma goes to Mahane Yehuda Market to buy a folk remedy for male infertility, and offers it to Bruria. Avishar begins viewing Chuma as a father figure, and his mother falls in love with Chuma. Chuma then realizes that Steve had also purchased the folk remedy earlier, which explains how he could be Avishar's father. The pair follow Avishar and see him leaving a note in the Western Wall, in which he wishes that Chuma was his father.

Steve and Chuma are captured by their former mob boss, who believes they are intending to run off with his money. However, they are saved by their mob boss's hitman; he is revealed to be the (previously infertile) husband of Bruria, who has come to her husband to inform her she is pregnant.

The movie ends with Chuma escorting Avishar to his soccer match, fulfilling the boy's wish, as well as Steve finally accepting Avishar as his son.

== Cast ==
- Guy Amir as Chuma
- Hanan Savyon as Steve
- Gal Amitai as Yiftach
- Chen Amsalem as Lizo
- Edna Blilious as Bruria
- Itzik Cohen as Elkaslasi
- Anastasia Fein as Doniasha
- Eli Haviv as Micky
- Igal Naor as Tzafuf

== Release ==
Maktub was released on June 16, 2018.
