= Paul Weston (In Treatment) =

Fictional character on the television series In Treatment

Dr. Paul Weston
- First appearance: "Laura: Week One"
- Created by: Hagai Levi
- Portrayed by: Gabriel Byrne

In-universe information
- Gender: Male
- Occupation: Psychologist and psychotherapist
- Family: Mother (deceased); Father, John Paul Weston (deceased); Stepmother; Brother, Patrick Weston
- Spouse: Kate (divorced)
- Children: Ian; Rosie; Max

Dr. Paul Weston is a fictional character on the five-nights-a-week HBO series, In Treatment. The character is portrayed by Gabriel Byrne, who was coined as TV's "latest Dr. McDreamy" by The New York Times for the role. According to Byrne, the character of Weston has flaws, but possesses certain virtues:

"I tend to think of him as an innately compassionate man, but a damaged man. But just because you’re damaged doesn’t mean you can’t be compassionate...I think what makes him a good therapist with all his patients, and sets him on the right road, whether he says the right thing or the wrong thing—he truly listens. He may not have the answer, but he’s paid the person the compliment of listening to them."

== Background ==
Growing up, Paul did not have a happy childhood. His father, who was a cardiac surgeon, left the family for a patient 26 years his junior when Paul was young. He was then left to take care of his depressed mother, playing the parental role in the broken family. Whilst at high school, Paul often got into trouble with the authorities, and when asked by counsellors about his aspirations for the future, he replied that he wanted to be anything but his father. Paul and his stepmother were often mistaken as either siblings or a pair of newlyweds whenever he joined his father's new family on special occasions as a young man. His decision to marry Kate in his late 20s was due to his admiration for her strength, something he did not see in his own mother in the aftermath of his parents' separation.

A little more of Paul's background is revealed in Season 2. We learn he has an older brother (Patrick) and that his father obtained his doctorate from the fictional "Dublin School of Medicine", which confirms that Paul's family is from Ireland and perhaps explains Weston's Dublin accent. (Paul places his father's doctorate on a shelf in his Brooklyn office in episode 21 of season 2 Mia: Week 5).

== Overview ==
At the time of the first episode of the show, professionally, Paul is a successful psychotherapist who appears to be the breadwinner of the family. His achievements have not only brought him to a respectable place professionally, but also to a secure financial position, allowing his family and himself to live comfortably. Paul has exceptional listening abilities that aid him in his work, but lately, he feels as if he has been "losing patience with [his] patients."

At home, problems are apparent between his wife (Kate) and himself. Paul is most comfortable in his office, creating distance between himself and Kate and the children. This is complicated by a mutual attraction with one of his patients.

== Character history ==
As the show begins, Paul is in his early 50s. Little is currently known about Paul's professional background or training, except that he obtained his BA and MS from Columbia and his PhD from The New School. However, in episode 27 season one, a Ph.D degree in Psychology from the University of Pennsylvania is visible in his office (he received post-doctoral psychoanalytic training at The New School in NYC). He also worked for a time at the fictional Baltimore Institute of Psychology under the tutelage of his mentor, Dr. Gina Toll.

Paul left the professional supervision of Gina nine years earlier after a large argument over reservations expressed by Gina in a letter of recommendation on Paul's behalf, among other issues. Since then, he has been conducting his practice from a home office, to the objections of his wife. Kate is frustrated by the fact that Paul always seems to be so "energetic" and "alive" in the office, but acts like an "anemic old man" outside of it. His suspicion that Kate is conducting an extramarital affair is confirmed when his wife tells him of it during a heated argument.

Furthermore, an extra tension is added when Laura, a 30-year-old patient, reveals her romantic feelings for Paul (addressed as "erotic transference") during one of their sessions together on Mondays. Realization of his own love for Laura slowly dawns on Paul when he begins to visit Gina for guidance on his problems both at home and work. In the end, Paul confesses to Laura his love for her at her home in the finale episode of Season 1, but a panic attack after receiving a call from his daughter, Rosie, stops him from consummating the relationship. Later, when a distraught Paul stops by Gina's house to tell her what happened, Gina concludes that Laura's decision to reject him after his anxiety attack means that through therapy, Paul has successfully made her realise that her attraction to him was merely a case of erotic transference. However, Paul appears to have been genuinely in love with her and was upset, saying that Laura may have been "the last love of my life, and I let her go."

In season 2, Paul is now divorced and has moved his practice to Brooklyn, New York. In the first episode of the season Paul is served with a malpractice lawsuit and becomes preoccupied with it.

Alex Sr. is suing Paul for negligence, charging him with failing to prevent the death of his son Alex, who voluntarily discontinued therapy and was killed in a plane crash that was either an accident or suicide. Alex Sr. and his lawyers contend that Paul's professional responsibility was to contact the military and report Alex Jr. unfit for duty. Alex Sr. later meets with Paul and makes a loaded offer: if Paul writes a letter taking blame for Alex Jr.'s death, he will drop the lawsuit, satisfied to have his belief that Paul is 100% at fault confirmed. Paul considers the offer but later concurs with Gina's advice and rejects it. The lawsuit is dismissed as frivolous, and Paul's angst about his professional competence is at least temporarily alleviated.

During season 3 Paul is still running his practice in New York. Suffering from insomnia he makes an appointment with a young psychoanalyist, Dr Adele Brouse, seeking a prescription for sleep medication. Adele insists on conducting an evaluation first and while Paul is initially reluctant to enter therapy again, they begin regular sessions.

Throughout the season Paul struggles with a variety of personal issues; he becomes convinced he has Parkinsons (the disease that killed his father) despite several doctors assuring him there is no confirmed signs yet - his youngest son comes to live with him unexpectedly, straining his relationship with his new girlfriend Wendy - Gina releases a book featuring a "morose" fictional character that Paul believes is based on him, leaving him deeply insulted and questioning his lifestyle. Paul also once again begins to doubt the effectiveness of therapy and his own ability to help people, and towards the end of the season develops a case of "erotic transference" of his own, beginning to fantasize about a life and relationship with Adele.

In the last episode, Paul admits to Adele he is dissatisfied with his life. He vows to make some changes and seemingly intends to close his practice to focus on his personal happiness. He discontinues therapy with Adele and in the final scene disappears into a crowded street.

In the season 4 revival, we hear that Paul is the long-time mentor and supervisor of the shows new lead character, Dr Brooke Taylor. He is never seen on-screen during season 4, aside from a photograph on Brooke's desk and a picture of him that appears on her phone when he attempts to call her. From dialogue throughout the season, we learn that Paul did return to psychotherapy and has since become popular and famous in his field, described by Brooke as "America's Therapist"; partially due to media appearances as a mental health pundit during the COVID pandemic. We also learn Paul is still based in New York, though he is often traveling, and that he has a new partner called Karina, though it is not clear if they are married.
