= Yaakov Cohen (actor) =

Israeli actor and comedian (1958–2024)

- יעקב כהן
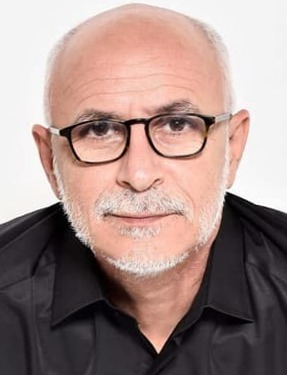
- Cohen in 2022
- Born: 27 September 1958; Meknes, Morocco
- Died: 2 November 2024 (aged 66); Tel Aviv, Israel
- Education: Beit Zvi
- Occupations: Actor; voice actor; stand-up comedian; television presenter
- Years active: 1984–2024

Yaakov Cohen (Hebrew: יעקב כהן; 27 September 1958 – 2 November 2024) was a Moroccan-born Israeli actor, stand-up comedian, voice artist, and television presenter.

== Life and career ==
Cohen was born in Meknes, Morocco, into a family of eleven children. In 1964, at the age of six, his family immigrated to Israel. They settled in Migdal HaEmek, where he was raised and educated. In 1977, he graduated from the Ort Rogozin high school in Migdal HaEmek.

In 1984, Cohen graduated from the 22nd class of the Beit Zvi School for the Performing Arts, alongside classmates such as Odia Koren, Idit Teperson, and Anat Waxman.

== Death ==
Cohen died from complications of Parkinson's disease on November 2, 2024, at the age of 66.

== Awards ==
Cohen received several awards for his contributions to Israeli theater:

- Outstanding Actor Award at the Acco Festival of Alternative Israeli Theatre (1988)
- Kalchkin Award
- Special Award for "Bustan Sephardi" (2008)
