= Ori Sivan =

- אורי סיון
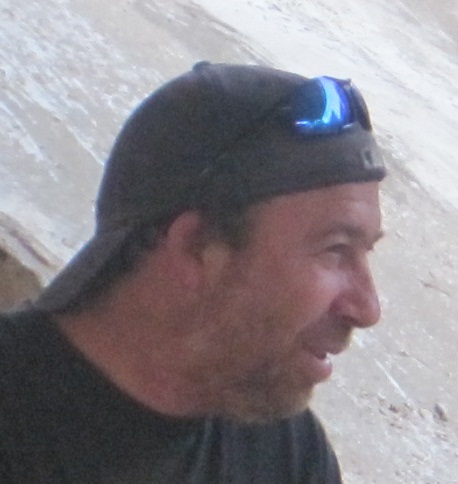
- Sivan on set, directing Barefoot, 2011
- Born: July 30, 1963 (age 63); San Francisco, California, United States
- Education: Tel Aviv University, Israel
- Occupations: Filmmaker: Film director, Film screenwriter, Television director, Television screenwriter
- Years active: 1996–present
- Notable work: Saint Clara; Florentine; Saturdays and Holidays; Betipul; In Treatment (US re-make)
- Spouse: Galit Sivan (1991-present)
- Children: 5

Ori Sivan (Hebrew: אורי סיון; born July 30, 1963, in San Francisco, California) is an Israeli film and television director and screenwriter. In a career spanning over two decades, he covered feature films, TV drama, TV movies, and documentaries. Sivan and his work won 11 Israeli Film Academy Awards, as well as international film awards, across all the above fields of film making. Sivan is the co-creator of In Treatment, the first Israeli TV drama series to ever be sold for re-make in the US (to HBO), followed by re-make in over 20 countries.

In parallel to his film making career, Sivan teaches film in the Israeli and US academia since 1996, and engages in writing for the Israeli written and online press. He is married to Galit Sivan, has 5 children, and live in community village South of Tel Aviv, Israel.

== Early life ==
Ori Sivan was born on July 30, 1963, in San Francisco, California, to an Israeli family, while his parents were PhD and Bachelor students at the nearby University of California, Berkeley. His father, Raphael Sivan (1935-2011) was a world-renowned electronics researcher and professor, as well as clinical psychologist, and was former head of the Electrical Engineering Department at the Technion - Israel Institute of Technology. His mother, Ilana Sivan (born 1941), is a clinical psychologist.

After his parents completed their studies, the family moved to Los Angeles, where his father worked at the local Caltech. Following Los Angeles, the family moved back to Israel, where Sivan spent most of his later childhood in the northern city of Haifa, except for a few additional years the family spent in the US following his father's work as a researcher with NASA's space program in Virginia and as professor at MIT in Boston, Massachusetts.

== Career ==
=== Early career ===
Following his military service, Ori Sivan studied at Tel Aviv University's film and television department during the years 1986–1991. As his graduation project, he co-directed with fellow student Ari Folman the documentary film Comfortably Numb, which portrayed Israel during the First Gulf War, focusing on real-time reactions and feelings of young people in Tel Aviv, petrified by the possibility of a deadly gas attack. That same year the film was nominated for the Israeli Film Academy Awards (the Israeli Oscars) and won best documentary in the documentary film category.

In 1996, Sivan, again in collaboration with Folman, wrote and directed his first feature film, Saint Clara, starring Lucy Dubinchek, Maya Maron, and Menashe Noi. The film received critical acclaim. In the Israeli Film Academy Awards that year, the film won in six categories, including best actress in a leading role (Dubinchek), best director, and best film. Later, the film participated in the American Academy Awards in the foreign film category, and won special prize of the jury in the Karlovy Vary International Film Awards in the Czech Republic.

=== Television drama ===
In 1997, Sivan changed directions and began focusing on television. Sivan wrote and directed, along with director Eytan Fox, the successful Israeli television drama series Florentine, starring Ayelet Zurer and Karin Ofir. Florentine achieved great success amongst viewers, and aired for three seasons. In 1998, Sivan participated in the project Short Stories about Love of the Israeli Channel 2 TV network, where he wrote and directed the short film Domino which won short film of the year in the London Fantasy Film Festival, and was broadcast on the BBC film channel.

In 2000, Sivan co-created and was head screenwriter of the popular Israeli television series Saturdays and Holidays, starring Alon Abutbul and Lior Ashkenazi, which ran for 5 seasons. Saturdays and Holidays was highly successful amongst both viewers and critics, won the Israeli Film Academy Award for television series and the Israeli Gold Screen Award. In 2003, Sivan wrote and directed the television film I Had a Wonderful Childhood.

In 2005, Sivan co-created, co-directed, and was head screenwriter of the original Israeli television series In Treatment (Betipul), starring Assi Dayan, Ayelet Zurer, and Maya Maron. In Treatment (Betipul), which includes 3 seasons and 80 episodes, won the Israeli Film Academy Awards best drama series as well as best screenplay for two years in a row. It was the first ever Israeli TV series to be sold in the US to the American premium cable and satellite TV network giant HBO for re-make.

The American version, In Treatment (same name), is based on the Israeli series' format, opening theme, and script, which is often word-for-word translations of the Israeli script. The American In Treatment series was critically acclaimed and was broadcast on HBO as a prime-time weeknight series, starring Gabriel Byrne, who won for his role as Dr. Paul Weston the Golden Globe Award for best actor in a drama series of 2008. In Treatment aired on HBO for 3 seasons from 2008 to 2010, received outstanding reviews, and won numerous honors, including Emmy, Golden Globe and Writers Guild awards. In addition to HBO, The original Israeli series was sold for re-make and broadcast in more than 20 countries including Spain, Italy, Russia, Mexico, Argentina, Belgium and The Netherlands.

In 2011, Sivan created and directed a 6 episodes historical mini drama series names Barefoot for Israel's HOT 3 TV channel.

=== Television documentaries ===
Sivan directed three documentary films for Channel 8 of the major Israeli cable network HOT, as part of its film series Israeli Culture Heroes, of which each film documents one Israeli culture hero from a fresh creative angle. The first film, Behind the Strings created in 2001, portrays the image of Klari Sarvash, the first harpist of the Israel Philharmonic Orchestra through a set of interviews. The second film, Zubin and I created in 2010, follows maestro Zubin Mehta, the Indian/Israeli/American world-famous music conductor. The third film, Alex in Wonderland created in 2012, focuses on Alex Levac the controversial Israeli photojournalist and street photographer, famous for his unique compositions and provocative political views.

=== Upcoming and announced projects ===
In the summer of 2014, Sivan is about to direct a new feature film named Harmony, a free adaptation of the biblical story of Abraham and his two wives Sara and Hagar, starring Alon Abutbul and Tali Sharon.

Sivan is also cooperating with filmmaker Ori Gruder in writing a unique Kabbalah-based detective/fantasy feature film, supported by two major Israeli film funds.

=== Acting credits ===
Ori Sivan had the role of himself, a filmmaker and friend of the leading character, in the 2008 feature animated documentary film Waltz with Bashir, which was released in movie theaters to wide acclaim. The film depicts an Israeli filmmaker in search of his lost memories of his experience as a soldier. It was nominated for the American Academy Awards in the Best Foreign Language Film category, and won a Golden Globe Award for Best Foreign Language Film.

=== Academic activity ===
Ori Sivan teaches film in the Film Department of the Sapir Academic College since 1996, in addition to film teaching in the US.

== Personal life ==
Ori Sivan is married to Galit Sivan, they have five children, and live in a community village South of Tel Aviv, Israel.

== Filmography ==
- Comfortably Numb (1991, short documentary, with Ari Folman)
- Saint Clara (1996, feature film, with Ari Folman)
- Florentine (1997, television drama series, with Eytan Fox)
- Domino (1998, short television film)
- Saturdays and Holidays (2000, television drama series, 5 seasons, with Rani Blayer and Ari Folman)
- Behind the Strings (2001, television documentary film)
- I Had a Wonderful Childhood (2003, television film)
- In Treatment (Betipul) (2005, television drama series, 3 seasons, with 2 co-creators)
- Zubin and I (2010, television documentary film)
- Barefoot (2011, television mini drama series)
- Alex in Wonderland (2012, television documentary film)
- "Harmonia" (2016, film retelling of the biblical story of Abraham and Sarah in a modern symphony setting)

== Awards and nominations ==
- Israeli Film Academy Awards - Best Documentary - Comfortably Numb (1991)
- Israeli Film Academy Awards - Best Director - Saint Clara (1996)
- Israeli Film Academy Awards - Best Film - Saint Clara (1996)
- Karlovy Vary International Film Festival - Special Prize of the Jury - Saint Clara (1996)
- London Fantasy Film Awards - Short Film of the Year - Domino (1998)
- Award of the Israeli Film and TV Academy - Best Television Series (along with 2 co-creators) - Saturdays and Holidays (2001)
- Award of the Israeli Gold Screen - Best Television Series (along with 2 co-creators) - Saturdays and Holidays (2001)
- Award of the Israeli Film and TV Academy - Best Drama Series (along with 2 other co-creators) - In Treatment (Betipul) (2006)
- Award of the Israeli Film and TV Academy - Best Script for a Drama Series (along with 5 other writers) - In Treatment (Betipul) (2006)
- Award of the Israeli Film and TV Academy - Best Drama Series (along with 2 other co-creators) - In Treatment (Betipul) (2007)
- Award of the Israeli Film and TV Academy - Best Script for a Drama Series (along with 5 other writers) - In Treatment (Betipul) (2007)
