= Ha-Chatzer (TV series) =

- Also known as: Grand Rabbi
- Hebrew: Ha-Chatzer
- Genre: drama
- Written by: Daniel Taub
- Country of origin: Israel

Production
- Producer: Daniel Paran

Ha-Chatzer (Hebrew: החצר, The Courtyard) is a 2003 Israeli telenovela on the lives of Hasidic Jews in Israel. It centers on a fictionalized Tel Aviv enclave of a Hasidic community that attempts to maintain its customs alongside a secular world, under the leadership of their Rebbe. The show was popular even among the religious Jewish community in Israel. The actor Amos Lavi played the role of the Hasidic Rebbe.

== See also ==
- A Life Apart: Hasidism in America (1981)
