= Avi Belleli =

Israeli singer and musician

Avi Belleli אבי בללי
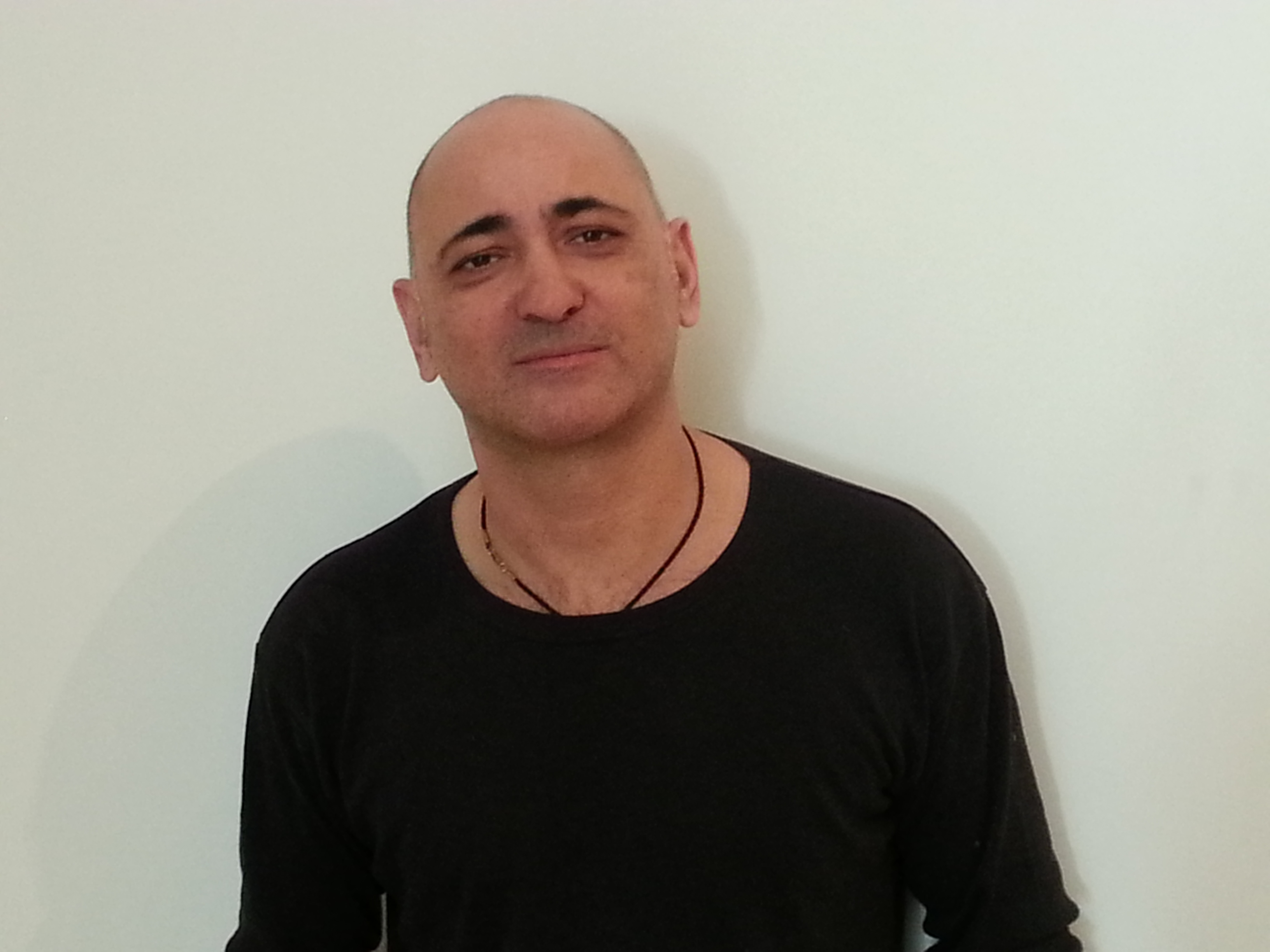

Background information
- Born: Avi Belleli; October 27, 1963 (age 62)
- Origin: Givatayim, Israel
- Genres: Rock
- Years active: 1981–present
- Label: Muzea
- Website: avibelleli.net

Avi Belleli (Hebrew: אבי בללי; born October 27, 1963) is an Israeli singer and musician.

== Biography ==
Avi Belleli was born on October 27, 1963, in Givatayim, Israel. His father, Moshe Belleli, was born in Alexandria to a family of Italian Jews who had moved to Egypt, in an Italian-speaking household in Corfu, and worked in a factory for the Israeli electrical appliances company Amcor. His mother, Luna Akunis, was born in Thessaloniki, spoke Ladino as her first language, and worked in Israel as a housecleaner and child-minder.

Belleli has been the lead vocalist and bass player of the Tel Aviv-based rock band Nikmat Hatraktor (Tractor's Revenge) since its formation in 1988. He also produced soundtracks for theatre, film and television. He has composed music for the Batsheva Dance Company and Haifa Theatre, and produced scores for Broken Wings, Betipul and Shtisel.

The Tractor's Revenge has made seven albums on Israeli labels, most of which have gone gold. Another of his collaborations is "Strawberry Cream and Gunpowder," a dance piece by Israeli choreographer, Yasmeen Goder, in which Belelli plays live on stage among the dancers.
