= Saint Clara (film) =

- Theatrical release poster
- קלרה הקדושה
- Directed by: Ari Folman; Ori Sivan
- Screenplay by: Ari Folman; Ori Sivan
- Based on: The Ideas of Saint Clara by Pavel Kohout
- Produced by: Mark Rosenbaum; Uri Sabag
- Starring: Lucy Dubinchik; Yigal Naor; Maya Maron
- Cinematography: Valentin Belonogov
- Edited by: Dov Stoyer
- Music by: Berry Sakharof
- Distributed by: Kino International
- Release date: 1 November 1996
- Running time: 85 minutes
- Country: Israel
- Languages: Hebrew; Russian; French; English

Saint Clara (Hebrew: קלרה הקדושה) is a 1996 Israeli film directed by Ari Folman and Ori Sivan with a screenplay by Folman based on the novel The Ideas of Saint Clara by Pavel Kohout. The film takes place in 1999 in a small Israeli town, in which a young girl called Clara Chanov (Lucy Dubinchik) discovers that she has paranormal powers that allow her to predict the future.

The film was selected as the Israeli entry for the Best Foreign Language Film at the 69th Academy Awards, but was not accepted as a nominee.

== Plot ==
The film opens with Eddie Tikel and "Rozy" Rosenthal running towards their classroom in the Golda School just a few moments before Headmaster Tissona (Yigal Naor) and Zvi Munitz, the classroom's homeroom teacher, arrive with the math results: the entire class got a perfect 100% on their test. After sarcastically "praising" the class, Munitz and Tissona proceed to denounce this as "an act of rebellion" and that the ringleader confess his or her action. As each of their classmates begin to be called up, Tikel and Rozy decide to take pills to help them avoid the interrogation. Elinor Galash, a math prodigy, is singled out as the person who helped solve the questions in the exam, though Tissona doesn't punish her and offers her sympathy. Next to be interrogated is Rozy, whom he attempts to plant the seed of doubt by falsely hinting that Rozy will be sold out, but when asked who blackmailed Elinor into solving the answers of the test, he is met by silence. Next up is Tikel, to whom Tissona tells him about a dream he had with Édith Piaf, then about an experience about his youth with a love interest, in an attempt to get him to confess to his "pathetic act of rebellion". Tikel, however, denies that he organised the act. Eventually, Galit Biron helps track Munitz and Tissona down to Clara Chanov, who almost immediately reveals that she gave the numbers of the test to the kids, and also that she had "an idea" as to which numbers would be given on the test, revealing that she has clairvoyance.

The next morning, Tikel and Rozy attempt to burn Galit Biron alive in retaliation for telling Munitz and Tissona about Clara. Galit, however, reveals that instead of the Sports period that day, they will have another math test, and that Clara told her about it. Tikel asks Clara about it, and she gives them 5 numbers from the book. As expected, Tissona and Munitz attempt to do a raffle pop-quiz to see if the last test was a fluke; Elinor Galash picks the 5 numbers from the book, as Clara predicted: 99, 404, 111, 890, and 1000. After the entire class finishes the quiz, Tikel is accosted about it by Tissona, who begins to suspect that he and Rozy are taking pills to avoid talking to the school authorities. After school, Tikel, Rozy, and Liby, a friend of theirs, talk about the events, and that Clara is too smart to guess the numbers of the test twice. As they walk away from the school grounds, the anarchist friends resolve to "do something real heavy that will put [them] in the country's history books." As they go their separate ways, Rozy tells Liby that Tikel is in love with Clara, and (erroneously) that Tikel might be a double agent for Tissona.

Later that afternoon, Munitz and Tissona go to Clara's house, and attempt to disprove that Clara has clairvoyance. Clara's family, however, insist that she is, even in the face of Munitz's scepticism. However, Clara and Tissona call the meeting short, as Clara has a vision: the kids' action, as revealed, was to hang the statue of school namesake Golda Meir in their homeroom classroom and set it on fire, something Clara, as her family is implied to be devotees of Golda Meir, takes as a deep insult. Tissona, now convinced that Clara does have clairvoyance, proclaims that she and him will lead the revolution that Tissona had been actually expecting for years, and warns her not to fall in love, for if she does, she stands to lose her powers.

The next morning, Munitz, still sceptical of Clara's powers, decides to break whatever hold she has on the classmates by giving her an algebraic problem without solution, and shunning any "help" she might need, even that of Tikel's who had arrived from Tissona's office after being warned to stay away from Clara. Munitz's plan goes awry when the sky darkens to a deep red and a stork flies in and breaks the window; it is implied, then later revealed, that Clara had called on the stork to get her out of the blackboard. To console himself over the failure of his plan, Munitz tells Tissona about the sole day he spent in Vietnam during the war, which ended up with him beating Bobby Fischer in chess; Tissona, for his part, reveals something that a number of people, especially Tikel, long suspected: he had slept with Édith Piaf in early 1961, and the experience resulted in Piaf writing "Non, Je Ne Regrette Rien".

Tikel and the others decide to lie low as a result of not only the stork but also the Golda statue incident. They decide to pay a visit to the Chanov household. Liby calls Clara "solid", and Rozy talks about Clara as a whole; Tikel, however, notes that a glance at her eyes makes people say things that they never would, and that she's fascinating because of that. Clara, meanwhile, also goes to Tikel's house, where she encounters Tikel's dad, a cop, who guesses that she was the one who guessed the numbers of the two quizzes. He asks Clara to help him find a girl that he was in love with since he was a kid; that girl turns out to be none other than Sharon, Tikel's mom. Impressed (though outwardly sceptical), Tikel's father has Clara write down the lottery numbers for that evening's lottery. He wins the lottery, and promises to give half the money to the Chanovs. However, the action was undermined by Igor Chanov, Clara's father, giving the lottery numbers to everyone in Kiryat Gat, as he works in the lottery plant. As they have dinner that evening, Elvis, Clara's uncle, is struck by shell shock after remembering what happened to his girlfriend after she ran into the nuclear zone in Ukraine (implied to be the then-recent Chernobyl zone). Later, as he struggles to remember what happened to Natasha, Clara tells him that she ran off with someone else, though she also tells Tikel that a bear ate her (which would imply that no-one truly knows what happened to Natasha).

The aftermath of the lottery drawing is felt when many people stage mass suicides, while others still stage angry protests, blaming Igor for their ruin. A reporter for the RTL programme Catastrophes in Israel reports the scene, and when she attempts to interview Tikel's dad, who happens onto the scene, he curses her out and quits his job on live TV.

Meanwhile, resentment brews between Rozy, Liby, and Tikel. Frustrated with Tikel's behaviour during the math quiz debacle, after the Golda statue incident, and now the botched lottery drawing, Rozy and Liby begin to mock Tikel, with Tikel being warned by Rozy that he wouldn't survive the Shoah as he "can't handle mental stress". The resentment boils over one evening, as Tikel picks a flower for Clara. Rozy, Liby, and Elinor's desk-mate appear and finally decide to openly betray Tikel. After being insulted by Rozy both over being "friendly" with Tissona and of being a double agent (and, by extension, his father), Tikel and Rozy fight, but Rozy not only punches him, but also hits him with a baseball bat, declaring that Clara would never go out with him. After returning home, Tikel and Sharon talk about what happened, and Sharon talks about how people used to fight over her, except one—Tikel's dad. As they talk, Clara arrives at his home, but while Tikel tries and makes himself look presentable, she leaves and bumps unwittingly into Rozy, his sister Vered, and Liby, who take her with them on a tour around the city. They go to a chocolate shop, which Rozy, armed with his baseball bat, breaks a window of to give Clara a piece of chocolate.

The next day, Clara is hailed by the whole classroom, in spite of Rozy using her as the head of a mini-classroom revolution. That afternoon, Tikel finally calls out Clara's name, much to Tissona's amazement. As Tikel and Clara walk away from the school grounds, they are accosted by Liby and Rozy, who again mock Tikel and say that Tikel is incapable of leading a revolution. Clara then gives back the piece of chocolate to Rozy, and tells him to give it to Liby, who truly loves him. As both Tikel and Clara continue to leave the school grounds, he asks her out to a movie, which Clara is unsure of, as an earthquake is about to hit the town. The news causes most of the town to leave in a panic, save for Tikel and Clara, their respective families, and Liby and Rozy. That evening, Rozy and Liby share their first moment as a couple together, with Rozy expressing admiration for Clara's newfound fame, and admitting that he feels guilty about betraying Tikel like they did. Meanwhile, on the way to the movie, Clara and Tikel wander around town, and encounter Elvis, who tells her not to be afraid of the earthquake, as well as a surprising appearance: Tissona, who also stayed, asks Tikel to forgive him, and expresses admiration at Tikel and Clara together. Then, during Raise the Titanic, Clara and Tikel kiss, and the earthquake occurs. Tikel, however, notes that the earthquake was only 4.0 in the Richter scale, and is passing. The film ends with a freeze frame of Clara and Tikel in the movie theatre.

== Cast ==
Actor	Role	Description
Lucy Dubinchik	Clara Chanov	A strange girl who recently immigrated from Russia to Israel.
Halil Elohev	Eddie Tikel	Clara's main romantic interest, who plots rebellious activities with Rosy.
Yigal Naor	Headmaster Tissona	An eccentric headmaster, who is fascinated by Clara.
Johnny Peterson	Rosy	Eddie's best friend, who is also in love with Clara.
Maya Maron	Libby	A tomboyish girl, friend of Eddie and Rosy.

== Awards ==
The film won 6 Ophir Awards, for best film, directing, best actress, best supporting actor, best editing and best music. It also won the best film award at the Haifa International Film Festival.

== See also ==
- List of submissions to the 69th Academy Awards for Best Foreign Language Film
- List of Israeli submissions for the Academy Award for Best Foreign Language Film
