= Hagai Levi =

Israeli film director (born 1963)

- חגי לוי
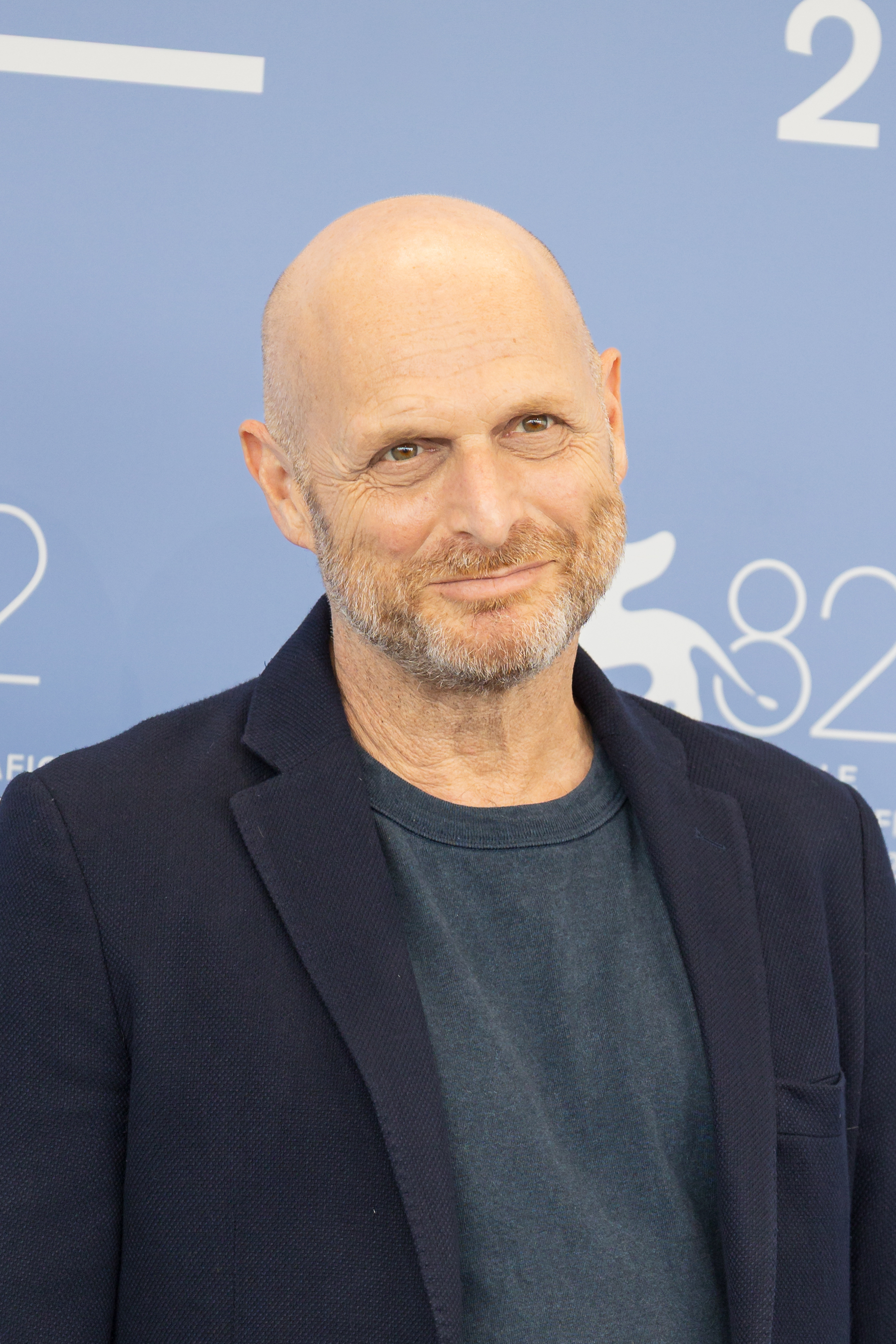
- Levi in 2025
- Born: 2 July 1963 (age 62); Sha'alvim, Israel
- Occupations: television creator, writer, director, producer

Hagai Levi (Hebrew: חגי לוי; born on 2 July 1963) is an Israeli television creator, writer, director, and producer.

== Early life and education ==
Levi was born in Sha'alvim, Israel in 1963. He studied psychology at Bar-Ilan University but left to complete his mandatory military service. Levi served in the Israeli Ground Forces before studying film at Tel Aviv University. Levi practiced Orthodox Judaism but became less religious while completing his military service.

== Career ==
Levi started his career after graduating from the Tel Aviv University film and Television department, with the feature film August Snow (1993) that he wrote, directed and co-produced. He later created and co-produced the anthology series Short Stories about Love, which twice won the Israeli Academy Award for best drama. He directed and co-created the medical drama series 101 (2000); co-created and co-produced the daily drama Love Around the Corner (2002, 270 episodes), and directed and co-wrote the TV single drama Premiere (2002). He also wrote for the drama series Shabatot Vehagim and served as a show runner of some telenovelas. He was a film critic for various newspapers for ten years during his period, as well as a lecturer in the leading film schools in Israel, and was the head of the drama department in the leading Israeli TV channel Keshet (2003–2006).

He is known for creating, directing and producing the television drama BeTipul and for producing and co-directing In Treatment, HBO's American adaptation of the show. BeTipul was also remade in many other languages in countries such as Canada, Brazil, Argentina, Chile, Italy, France, Russia, The Netherlands, Poland, Hungary, Czech Republic, Serbia, Slovenia, Croatia, Japan, and China. Levi served as an executive producer and consultant in most of these adaptations. Levi won the Ophir Award for producing BeTipul, and along with Nir Bergman, he won the Israeli Academy's Best Director award for directing the series. In 2013 Levi created and directed the Israeli television mini-series The Accursed. It was an Israeli Academy nominee for best drama series. Levi also produced several award-winning documentaries, among them It Kinda Scares Me and Aviv, both directed by Tomer Heymann, and served as a story and script editor for numerous Israeli drama series.

Levi won a Golden Globe Award for co-creating and co-producing the television drama The Affair with Sarah Treem. In 2014 announced his intention to retire from writing The Affair, citing dissatisfaction with the commercial aspects of U.S. television development. However, in 2019, he co-created, co-produced and co-directed the television drama Our Boys for HBO, which premiered August 12, 2019. That same year it was announced that he was developing a television series for Endeavour Content with Romi Aboulafia and film producer Ben Giladi.

In 2021, Levi wrote, co-produced and directed Scenes from a Marriage, an American drama television for HBO starring Oscar Isaac and Jessica Chastain. It is an English-language remake of the 1973 Swedish miniseries of the same name by Ingmar Bergman. It was presented at the 2021 Venice Film Festival and it premiered on September 12, 2021, on HBO.
