= Ari Folman =

Israeli film director

- ארי פולמן
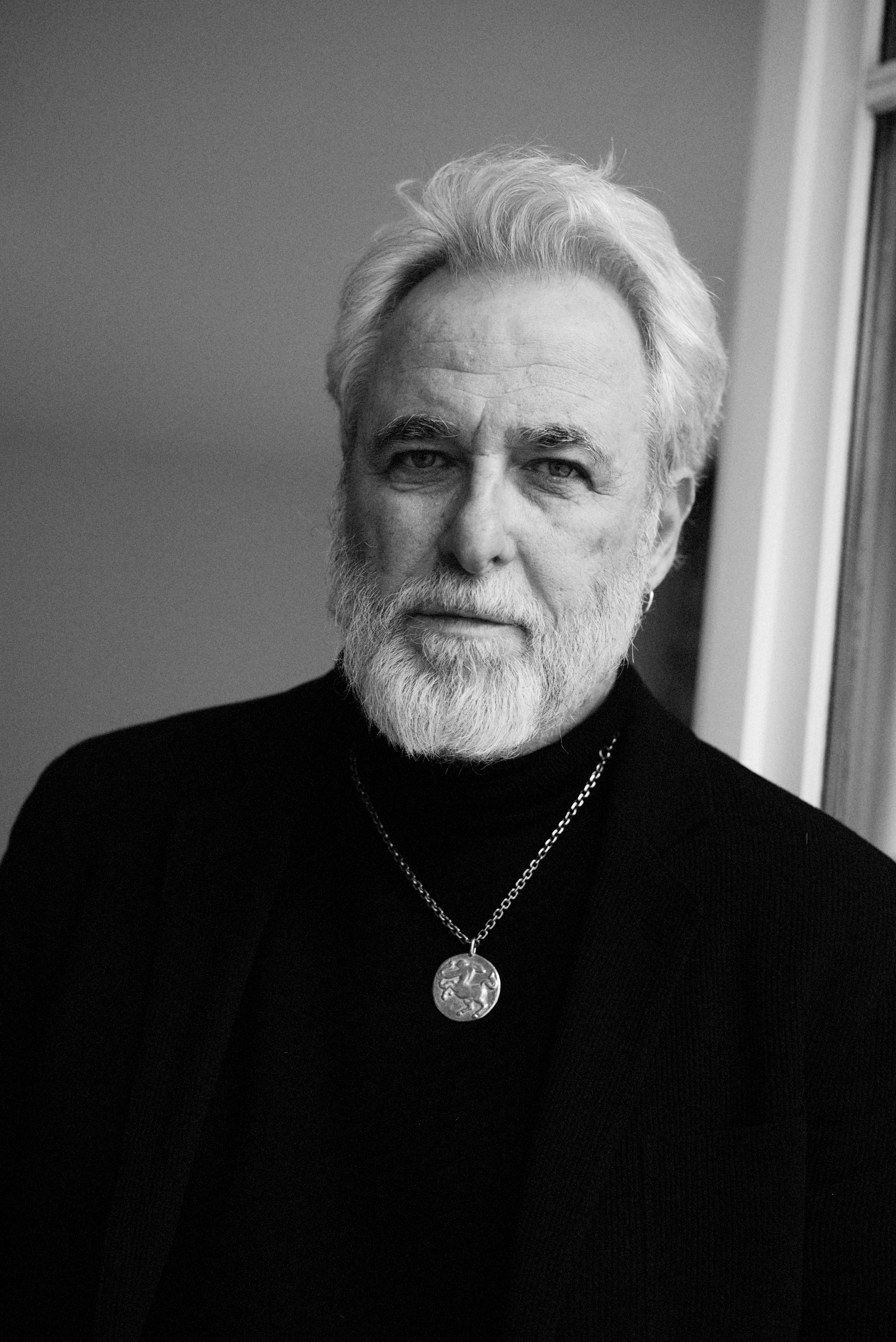
- Born: December 17, 1962 (age 63); Haifa, Israel
- Occupations: Film director, screenwriter, film score composer
- Years active: 1996–present
- Known for: Waltz with Bashir
- Spouse: Anat Asulin

Ari Folman (Hebrew: ארי פולמן; born December 17, 1962) is an Israeli film director, screenwriter, and film score composer. He directed the Oscar-nominated animated documentary film Waltz with Bashir (2008) and the live-action/animated film The Congress. He is a member of the Academy of Motion Picture Arts and Sciences.

== Early life and education ==
Ari Folman was born in Haifa in 1962. His parents were Polish-Jewish Holocaust survivors from Łódź Ghetto. Upon his high school graduation, he served in the Golani Brigade in the Israel Defense Forces. Folman served in the IDF during the 1982 Lebanon war, and was in the area of the Sabra and Shatila massacre.

== Career ==
In 2001, Folman directed Made in Israel, following two rivaling couples sent to capture the last Nazi and return him to Israel for a public trial.

In 2006, Folman was head writer of the Hot 3 drama series BeTipul. Ari Folman's memories of the aftermath of the 1982 Sabra and Shatila massacre, which took place when he was a 19-year-old soldier, served as the basis for his movie Waltz with Bashir. The film follows his attempt to regain his memories of the war through therapy, as well as conversations with old friends and other Israelis who were present in Beirut around the time of the massacre.

In 2018, Folman adapted Holocaust victim Anne Frank's diary into a graphic novel illustrated by David Polonsky. In 2021, Folman directed Where Is Anne Frank, an animated drama film based on Frank's life, with the animation styled after Polonsky's illustrations for Folman's 2018 graphic novel adaptation of The Diary of a Young Girl.

After the October 7 attacks in 2023, Folman began interviewing families of Israeli hostages under a project titled "#BringThemHomeNow".

== Personal life ==
Folman's wife, Anat Asulin, is also a film director. As of 2008, they lived in Tel Aviv. He is a fan of Liverpool F.C..

== Awards and recognition ==
- Ophir Award - Best Director - Saint Clara (1996)
- Karlovy Vary International Film Festival - Special Prize of the Jury - Saint Clara (1996)
- Award of the Israeli Television Academy - Best Script for a Drama Series (along with 5 other writers) - Betipul (2006)
- Recipient of the Lynn and Jules Kroll Fund for Jewish Documentary Film - Waltz with Bashir (2007)
- Ophir Award - Best Director - Waltz with Bashir (2008)
- Ophir Award - Best Screenplay - Waltz with Bashir (2008)
- Golden Globe Award for Best Foreign Language Film - Waltz with Bashir (2008)
- Directors Guild of America Awards - Outstanding Directorial Achievement in Documentary - Waltz with Bashir (2008)
- Writers Guild of America Awards - Best Documentary Screenplay - Waltz with Bashir (2008)
- Animafest Zagreb - Grand Prix for feature film - Waltz with Bashir (2009)
- Tokyo Anime Award Festival - Animation of the Year Featured Film Category - The Congress (2014)

== Filmography ==
- Sha'anan Si (1991, short documentary, with Ori Sivan)
- Saint Clara (1996, with Ori Sivan)
- Made in Israel (2001)
- Waltz with Bashir (2008)
- The Congress (2013)
- Where Is Anne Frank (2021)

=== Television ===
- BeTipul - Scriptwriter
