= Hot 3 =

Israeli television channel of HOT

HOT3
- Country: Israel
- Broadcast area: Israel

Programming
- Language: Hebrew
- Picture format: 576i (16:9 SDTV); 1080i (HDTV)

Ownership
- Owner: HOT

History
- Launched: 1989; 37 years ago
- Former names: Arutz HaMishpaha (The Family Channel; 1989–1994); Arutz 3 (Channel 3; 1994–March 2004)

Links
- Website: www.hot.net.il/HOT.aspx (defunct)(in Hebrew)

Hot 3 (styled as HOT3; Hebrew: הוט 3; also available in HD as HOT3 HD) is an Israeli television channel of the cable television company HOT. First introduced as The Family Channel in the early 1990s and later simply as Channel 3, it was one of the first exclusive channels of regulated cable television in Israel.

== History ==
The channel was founded by Udi Miron in 1989 together with the establishment of ICP (Israel Cable Programming), and was one of the first cable channels in Israel with their launch in 1990.

At first the channel's program schedule mostly included dramas, some American shows from the past (Soap, All in the family), soap operas such as The Young and the Restless, and a few experimental original productions.

Within a few years, the channel became the Israeli home of many successful television shows from America and other countries, adding the tag line "The best shows in the world". However, in 2002 the channel lost this privilege due to a financial dispute with Warner Bros. Television Studios, its main source, and could not continue to air content distributed by Warner. This resulted in Channel 3 losing shows such as Friends, ER, The Sopranos and The West Wing, which were soon purchased by other Israeli channels.

Since then the channel has added more and more original content while continuing to air non-Warner purchased shows. The channel's name was changed to "Hot 3" in 2004, not long after the three Israeli cable companies united and binder the name Hot.

To date, the longest-running original show on the channel was Good Evening with Guy Pines, a televised entertainment magazine hosted by Guy Pines, covering stories from Israel and the world. This show aired at least 4 times a week for 13 seasons between 1997 and 2010, and an earlier version was the Israeli Entertainment Tonight, also hosted by Pines which aired from 1994 to 1996. Good Evening with Guy Pines moved to Channel 10 in 2010.

=== Rebranding ===
Having produced, in January 2009, the first ever Israeli original drama to be shot in high definition (Pillars of Smoke (Timrot Ashan)), it launched Hot 3 HD in January 2010, providing a high definition simulcast of Hot 3.

In October 2011, after 20 years of broadcasting in fullscreen 4:3 aspect ratio, the original SDTV channel was transferred to a widescreen 16:9 aspect ratio broadcast, with accordance to most of its content.

As of an edit in 2017, many (but not all) of the channel's external acquisitions had moved to HOT HBO, making room in the schedule for Hot 3 to air original and reality dramas.
