= The Golem (2018 film) =

- Theatrical release poster
- Directed by: Doron Paz; Yoav Paz
- Written by: Ariel Cohen
- Produced by: Shalom Eisenbach
- Starring: Hani Furstenberg; Ishai Golan; Brynie Furstenberg; Adi Kvetner; Lenny Ravich; Alex Tritenko
- Cinematography: Rotem Yaron
- Edited by: Itamar Goldwasser; Einat Glaser-Zarhin
- Music by: Tal Yardeni
- Production company: Epic Pictures Group
- Distributed by: Epic Pictures Group
- Release dates: 27 August 2018 (FrightFest London); 24 January 2019
- Running time: 95 minutes
- Country: Israel
- Language: English
- Box office: $267,793

The Golem is a 2018 Israeli period supernatural horror film directed by Doron and Yoav Paz, and written by Ariel Cohen. It stars Hani Furstenberg, Ishai Golan, Brynie Furstenberg, and Konstantin Anikienko. The Golem is based on the Jewish legend of the same name, and the film's creators felt that the legend, which they referred to as "the Jewish Frankenstein", had never been properly developed into a film since the 1951 version The Emperor and the Golem. Originally it was intended to retain the original appearance of the title character for the film, "In the beginning, when we just started on the idea for the movie, we tried to tell the story as it is. That is with the real giant creature made of mud and clay,". The idea was soon abandoned, however, after realizing that it would not fit with the story they wanted to convey, deciding instead to reimagine the classic tale for a more contemporary audience while staying true to its original themes. Principal photography for The Golem commenced in the summer of 2017 near Kyiv, Ukraine, for a month and a half, with the majority of the film was shot in an isolated outdoor set, "in the middle of nowhere".

On April 24, 2018; it was announced that Dread Central had acquired distribution rights to The Golem as their first original production under their "Dread Central Presents" banner, with Epic Pictures serving as executive producers for a limited theatrical release slated for February 2019. The film later made its official premiere at the London FrightFest Film Festival on August 27, 2018. The film would later be released on DVD, Blu-ray, and Video-on-Demand on February 5, 2019. The Golem received positive reviews from critics, who praised Furstenberg's performance, cinematography, and atmosphere; and was nominated for several awards by the Israeli Film Academy.

== Plot ==
In the year 1673, in a small Shtetl in Lithuania, Horrovits, the shtetl's rabbi, advises his son Benjamin to divorce his wife Hanna due to it being seven years since the death of their son, and she has not conceived since then. Dismissing his father's advice, Benjamin smuggles a Torah for Hanna and warns her that it is a Kaballah; many men have gone mad after reading its texts. The couple makes love, with Hanna applying a contraception potion.

During Hanna's pregnant sister Rebecca's wedding, a group of peasants in plague masks arrive. Their leader, Vladimir, accuses them of cursing their people with the Black Death, claiming that none of the Jews has contracted it. Intending to massacre the village, Vladimir is stopped when Perla says she will try to heal his sick daughter. Horrovits suggests the village repent in order to save themselves. Hanna argues that they should fight back and make a Golem to protect the village, but is rebuffed.

Hanna discovers her sister had a miscarriage after being assaulted by one of the invaders. Enraged, she sneaks into the synagogue and finds the 72 secret names of God hidden in the Torah in order to reveal the code of merkabah, which could summon a Golem. She forms a mud sculpture of the Golem, and places a Shem HaMephorash inside its mouth, completing the ceremony by setting ablaze a Star of David. The next day, she is ambushed by a group of invaders, who beat and hang her. She is saved by the Golem, who bears an uncanny resemblance to her dead son. Hanna wipes the mud off its forehead, revealing human skin with the word "EMET" (Hebrew:Truth) carved into it. Perla confronts Hanna, revealing that when another Golem was summoned to protect them in the past, the creature had gone on a rampage against the very people it was supposed to protect. She warns that the Golem is not a living thing and that Hanna should destroy it before it becomes too dangerous. Hanna then tries to drown the Golem, but discovers that it cannot be killed by normal means.

Hanna spies Benjamin flirting with another woman; the woman is slaughtered by the Golem. The village discovers the woman's corpse and presume she was murdered by outsiders. Rebecca's husband is killed in the ensuing fight with the invaders, and Benjamin is saved by the Golem, who is acting upon Hanna's emotions. A terrified Vladimir and his followers flee. At dinner, the Golem stabs himself, showing Hanna that they are connected through pain stimulus. While Hanna and Benjamin have sex, Perla sneaks in and tries to kill the Golem, only to be killed by it instead. Benjamin discovers Perla's corpse, and pleads with Hanna to destroy the Golem; she refuses, claiming it is just a boy.

Fearing that the Golem has become a danger to the village, Benjamin assembles a minyan. He lures the Golem to the synagogue, and Horrovits tries to kill it by using the Pulsa diNura death curse. The plan almost succeeds until Vladimir, who has returned after his daughter has died, begins to set fires around the village, distracting them. The Golem slaughters Horrovits and goes on a rampage. Vladimir is about to kill Hanna when the Golem tears his heart out, then attempts to kill everyone in sight until Benjamin pleads again with Hanna. Hanna kisses the Golem goodbye, removing the scroll of God's name from its mouth, killing it.

== Cast ==
- Hani Furstenberg as Hanna
- Ishai Golan as Benjamin
- Brynie Furstenberg as Perla
- Adi Kvetner as Jacob
- Lenny Ravich as Horrovits
- Alex Tritenko as Vladimir
- Konstantin Anikienko as The Golem

== Production ==
=== Development ===
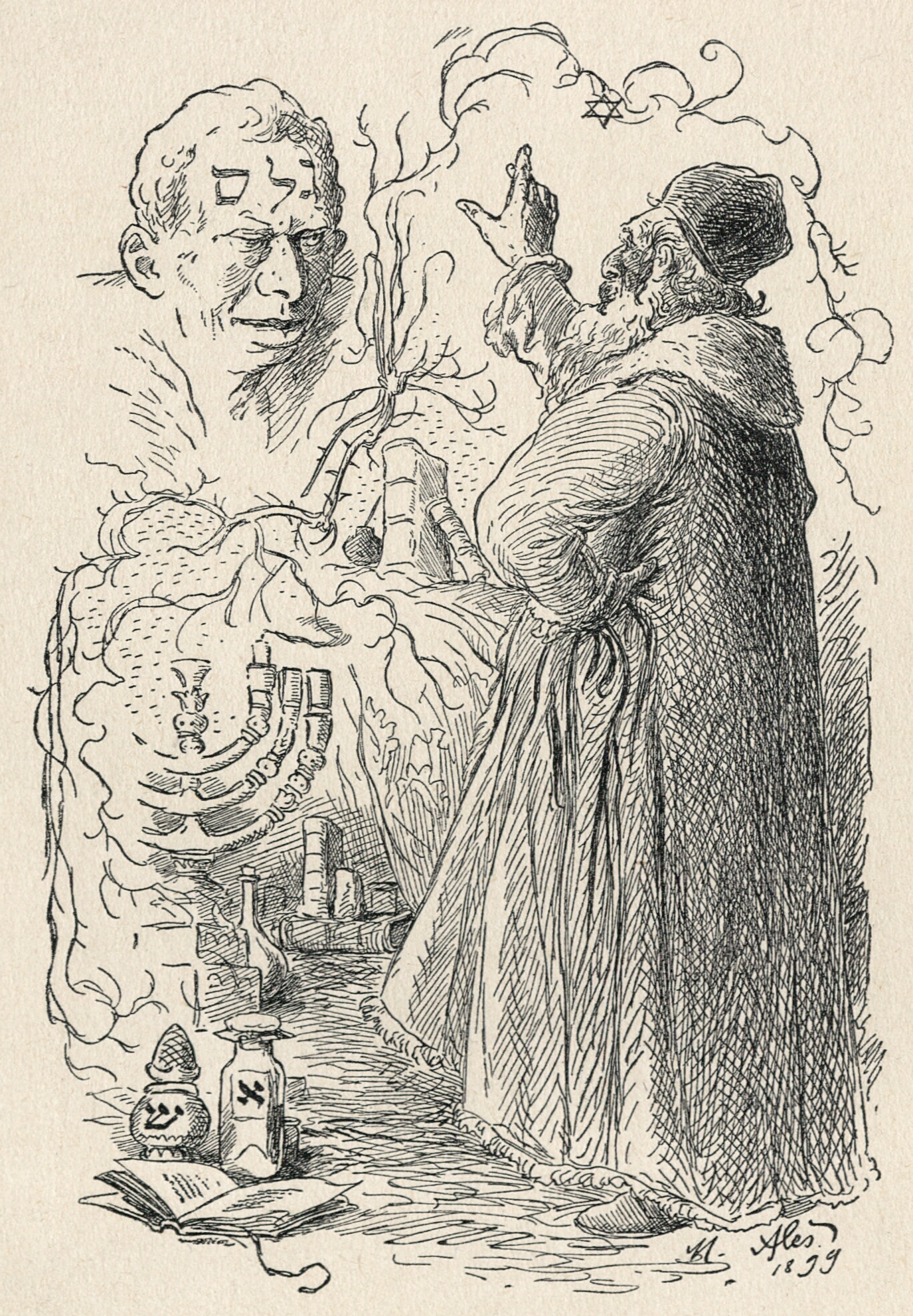
The Golem was partially based on the Jewish legend of The Golem of Prague

The Golem was written by Ariel Cohen and directed by the Paz Brothers. The film marks the Israeli filmmakers third directorial effort, whose previous efforts include Phobidilia (2009), and JeruZalem (2013). The film itself is partially based on Jewish legend of the same name, specifically the legend of the Golem of Prague, which dates back to 1834, and involves the creation of a golem by a rabbi to defend the Jewish ghetto based in Prague, which results in the golem going on a murderous rampage.

The sons of famed Israeli filmmaker Jonathan Paz, Doron and Yoav grew up with hearing the stories of the golem: "The Golem stories are well known in Israel and we think every kid knows about it in some way or another.... We didn’t grow up in an orthodox house, but this story, about a giant monster who saves the Jews from their enemies – it blew our minds." After the success of their 2013 film JeruZalem, the Paz Brothers wanted their next project to be based on Jewish culture and legends, "we thought there’s an appetite for more, so we said we’re Jews in Israel with so much culture and so much mythology around us. Nobody had handled it yet, so we thought this is the path we should go by". After looking into the various Jewish myths and legends, the brothers decided upon adapting the Jewish legend of the Golem. The Paz Brothers felt that the legend, which they referred to as "the Jewish Frankenstein", had never been properly developed into a film since the silent 1920 version The Golem: How He Came into the World. In an interview with PopHorror, the brothers also stated that they were drawn to the elements of Cohen's script which they felt was a very dark, and emotional drama. Originally it was intended to retain the original appearance of the title character for the film, "In the beginning, when we just started on the idea for the movie, we tried to tell the story as it is. That is with the real giant creature made of mud and clay,". The idea was soon abandoned, however, after realizing that it would not fit with the story they wanted to convey, deciding instead to reimagine the classic tale for a more contemporary audience while staying true to its original themes. The brothers later explained, "We like character-driven horror so dealing with just a giant monster wasn’t that appealing for us. That’s how we came up with the idea of dealing with a golem KID." Unlike their previous effort JeruZalem, which they felt relied too much on jump scares, the Paz Brothers stated that they wanted the film to be "a slow burn", focusing more on building atmosphere, and tension as well as the development of the lead character Hanna. "[W]e wanted people to be inside Hanna, to show what she’s going through and tell her story – and not to give thrills every few minutes. The film's bigger budget also allowed the filmmakers to focus more on creating the proper tone and scope for the film. As Doron Paz stated in an interview, "Having a much bigger budget this time allowed us to create the scope needed to re-tell the legend of the Golem." With Yoav Paz further adding that the film's producer Shalom Eisenbach and Epic Pictures "believe in our vision and excited to get it in front [of an] audience".

=== Casting ===
Israeli-American actress Hani Furstenberg was cast in the film's main role of Hanna. Furstenberg had previously acted in Yossi & Jagger, Campfire, and The Loneliest Planet. The Paz Brothers had originally contacted Furstenberg about starring in the lead role, feeling that she was the right person for the part. However, Furstenberg opted out two hours before the filmmakers were able to meet her to talk about the role. Furstenberg later recalled, "A friend finally urged me to be a part of the project and read the script … I fell in love with the heart of the story. It’s a very special film in the genre." Unable to find the right actress for the role, the filmmakers recontacted Furstenberg who accepted the role. Referring to her character in the film, Furstenberg called her "a feminist before her time", further explaining "she’s underneath the floorboards of the synagogue, studying secretly, and she just happens to be much smarter and much braver than all the men above her". Furstenberg also explained Hanna's decision to have the Golem take on the form of a child stemmed from the loss of her child seven years prior, which allows the two to "become one and the same". Israeli film and television actor Ishai Golan was later cast in the role of Benjamin. The Paz Brothers had previously known about the actor and were thrilled when he accepted the role. The title character in the film was played Konstantin Anikienko, a local from Ukraine, where the film was shot. The Paz Brothers later commended Anikienko as being "super professional and energetic".

=== Filming ===
Principal photography for The Golem commenced in the summer of 2017 near Kyiv, Ukraine, for a month and a half. As the filmmakers later recalled, the majority of the film was shot in an isolated outdoor set, "in the middle of nowhere". The location had previously been used in Russian film and subsequently abandoned for decades before the filmmakers decided to film there. Furstenberg described the film's location as being acres of open land, "It didn’t feel like a [film] set. It really felt like we were in this other time." The environment during filming was reportedly one of the coldest summers in Ukraine. The filmmakers later stated that the cold temperatures and isolated location helped them get into the mood of the film: "it really put us in the mood as the filmmakers. So often you shoot a scene then go home to your family and friends. Here, we were so isolated, and it was all about the film." Part of the film's crew members were locals from Ukraine, who had difficulty communicating with the other cast and crew members. The filmmakers later stated that the language barrier between the cast and crew actually proved to be beneficial, as it gave them more time than usual to prepare.

== Release ==
=== Theatrical release ===
On April 24, 2018; it was announced that Dread Central had acquired distribution rights to The Golem as their first original production under their "Dread Central Presents" banner, with Epic Pictures serving as executive producers for a limited theatrical release slated for February 2019. Epic Pictures later presented footage of the film to potential buyers at the Cannes Film Festival.

The Golem made its official premiere at the London FrightFest Film Festival on August 27, 2018. It was later screened at the Busan International Film Festival on October 5, as a part of its "Midnight Passion" program. On November 9, that same year, it was screened at the Morbido Film Fest in Mexico. The film was later screened at the Utopia Film Festival on December 6, 2018. The film made its North American premiere at the 18th annual Screamfest Horror Film Festival on October 14, 2018.

=== Home media ===
It was announced that The Golem would be released on DVD, Blu-ray, and Video-on-Demand on February 5, 2019. Epic Pictures would later release the film on that day, and on February 19, that same year.

== Reception ==
=== Critical response ===
On Rotten Tomatoes, the film has an approval rating of 86%, based on 28 reviews, with an average rating of 6.6/10. The site's consensus reads, "A chillingly effective horror story rooted in rich folklore, The Golem blends centuries-old stories with timely themes to powerful effect." On Metacritic, the film has a weighted average score of 63 out of 100, based on 4 critics, indicating "generally positive reviews".

Noel Murray from Los Angeles Times gave the film a positive review, calling it "A well-crafted and idiosyncratic supernatural thriller". In his review, Murray praised the film for its sense of unease, performances, and surprisingly detailed old-world European setting which he called "[a] rich, realistic background adds a tragic dimension to what happens when Hanna tries to play God". Anton Bitel from SciFi Now praised the film, writing, "Beautifully shot in the magic light of Central Europe, The Golem feels all at once classical in its storytelling, and yet unfamiliar in its particulars, as it delves deep into Jewish esoterica for its mythological underpinnings." Kat Hughes from The Hollywood News.com gave the film a mostly positive review, commending the film for its unique portrayal of the title character, and Furstenberg's performance. Hughes concluded his review by writing, "Slow going, and drastically different from previous works, The Golem struggles at times to fully hold the attention, but it ultimately works as a demonstration of The Paz Brothers’ range." Michael Klug from HorrorFreakNews.com awarded the film 4.5 out of 5 stars, praising the film's atmosphere, performances, production values, special effects, and story. Clug concluded his review by writing, "With a strong emotional core, great performances from a talented cast (including a mesmerizing lead performance from Hani Furstenberg) and beautiful production values – The Golem is a clear winner." Kim Newman praised the film's direction, script, and Furstenberg's performance, calling the film "an impressive, grim, period supernatural horror movie which is essentially Fiddler on the Roof meets Pet Sematary." Dennis Schwartz of Ozus' World Movie Reviews rated the film a grade B+, praising the film's atmosphere, unpredictable and provocative narrative, and cinematography. Bobby Lee Lepire of Film Threat rated the film 8/10 stars, writing, "The Golem is creepy, as the cinematography is awash with atmosphere and the use of such a creature is interesting. The dramatic side of things mostly holds up as well, and when combined with the excellent acting, the movie turns out to be very effective and memorable."

Alternately, Adam Mock from Film Inquiry gave the film a negative review, writing, "Pros and cons weighted in, The Golem is a slight recommend for those who enjoy a slow burn in their horror fare, at an hour thirty-five the commitment of the viewer is breezier than it feels. If paced more efficiently, this could have definitely satisfied a broader audience, but instead, we are left with lackluster horror mixed with a decent drama." Roger Moore from Movie Nation commended the film's cinematography, and climax, but criticized the film for its lack of compelling performances, and suspense.

=== Accolades ===
Award	Date of ceremony	Category	Recipients	Result	Ref.
Israeli Film Academy	22 September 2019	Best Actress	Hani Furstenberg	Nominated	
Israeli Film Academy	22 September 2019	Best Sound	Yuval Bar-on	Nominated	
Israeli Film Academy	22 September 2019	Best Cinematography	Rotem Yaron	Nominated	

== See also ==
- The Golem: How He Came into the World
- Der Golem
