= Thanadsri Svasti =

Thai media personality and singer

Mom Rajawongse Thanadsri Svasti
- ถนัดศรี สวัสดิวัตน์
- 2011 portrait
- Born: 28 May 1927; Phetchabun Palace Bangkok, Siam
- Died: 27 August 2019 (aged 92); Bangkok, Thailand
- Occupations: Food writer; singer; radio and television broadcaster
- Notable work: "Shell Chuan Chim"
- Spouses: M.L. Pra-on Malakul (m. 1952; div. 1958) Rojana Svasti Na Ayudhya (m. 1962; died 2019)
- Children: Mom Luang Sirichalerm Svasti; Mom Luang Permvut Svasti; Mom Luang Parson Svasti
- Parents: Prince Chalermsri Svasti (father); Mom Charoen Svasti (mother)
- Awards: National Artist

Mom Rajawongse Thanadsri Svasti (Note: Mom rajawongse and mom luang are Thai honorific hereditary titles denoting a royal bloodline.) (Thai: หม่อมราชวงศ์ถนัดศรี สวัสดิวัตน์, RTGS: Thanatsi Sawatdiwat, 28 May 1927 – 27 August 2019) was a Thai writer, singer, broadcaster and actor, best known as a culinary expert and for his food writing, especially the "Shell Chuan Chim" (เชลล์ชวนชิม) food guide.

Thanadsri grew up in the royal Sa Pathum Palace, and was attending university when World War II disrupted his studies and led him to join the renowned Suntaraporn band. As a singer, he recorded over 200 songs. He had a brief television acting career, before becoming known as a food columnist—"Shell Chuan Chim" was extremely influential and propelled the businesses of many restaurants—and a radio and television presenter. In recognition of his musical career, he was named a National Artist in performing arts in 2008.

== Early life ==
Thanadsri was born on 28 May 1927 (Note: Some sources say 1926.) at Phetchabun Palace in Bangkok. He was the second of three children, and the elder son, of Prince Chalermsri Svastivatana (Note: Chalermsri was a son of Prince Svasti Sobhana, himself a son of King Mongkut (Rama IV, r. 1851–1868) and half-brother of King Chulalongkorn (Rama V, r. 1868–1910).) and his wife Mom Charoen. (Note: Mom is a title for a commoner wife of a prince.) As a grandnephew of Queen Savang Vadhana, (Note: Savang Vadhana was a sister of Svasti Sobhana, and a consort to Chulalongkorn.) Thanadsri was brought up in Sa Pathum Palace in the company of princes Ananda Mahidol and Bhumibol Adulyadej, both of whom would later become kings. (Note: Ananda and Bhumibol were both grandsons of Savang Vadhana.) Thanadsri grew up observing the culinary practices and traditions of the royal palace, his paternal grandmother Mom Lamun being head of the Sa Pathum palace kitchens and his mother also working the royal kitchens for Queen Saovabha Phongsri. (Note: Saovabha was the highest-ranking of Chulalongkorn's four queens.) He attended Rajini School until the age of ten, and then went to the Horwang Secondary School of Chulalongkorn University before graduating secondary school from Debsirin School.

Thanadsri's father had wished for him to follow a military career, but following the abolition of absolute monarchy in 1932, the country's military colleges refused to admit people of royal bloodline. Thanadsri instead attended Thammasat University (then known as the University of Moral and Political Sciences), finishing pre-collegiate studies at the university's preparatory school in 1942, just as World War II reached Thailand.

== Music and media career ==
At Thammasat, Thanadsri had broadened his social circle, and was exposed to the hardship faced by many of his friends. He began singing for money with them, and soon joined the Suntaraporn band, having been introduced by the band leader Eua Sunthornsanan's wife, who was a classmate. Thanadsri toured with the band as classes were put on hold during the war, and began singing on stage. He became a regular singer for the Publicity Department's (now the Public Relations Department) nine-o'clock wartime radio broadcast, often standing in for Eua himself.

Following the war, Thanadsri worked briefly as a clerk for the Ministry of Foreign Affairs, and travelled to England to study law. (He did not complete his undergraduate degree at Thammasat.) However, he was more occupied by nightlife and entertainment, and neglected his studies, of which he joked that instead of graduating as a barrister, he became a bartender. While in London, he also worked as a radio broadcaster for the Thai-language programming of the BBC.

After returning from England, Thanadsri pursued a career in the growing media industry. He continued singing with Suntaraporn, and made over 200 recordings throughout his lifetime. He did pioneering work on television, appearing on Channel 4 Bang Khun Phrom, Thailand's first television station, as the lead actor in the country's first televised soap operas in 1956. He also served as a scriptwriter, presenter and producer. Later, from the late 1970s, he presented several radio and television programmes, including the talk show Khrop Chakkrawan (ครอบจักรวาล) and the student quiz show Kanbin Thai Khai Chakkrawan (การบินไทยไขจักรวาล), both of which he presented for over twenty years.

== "Shell Chuan Chim" ==
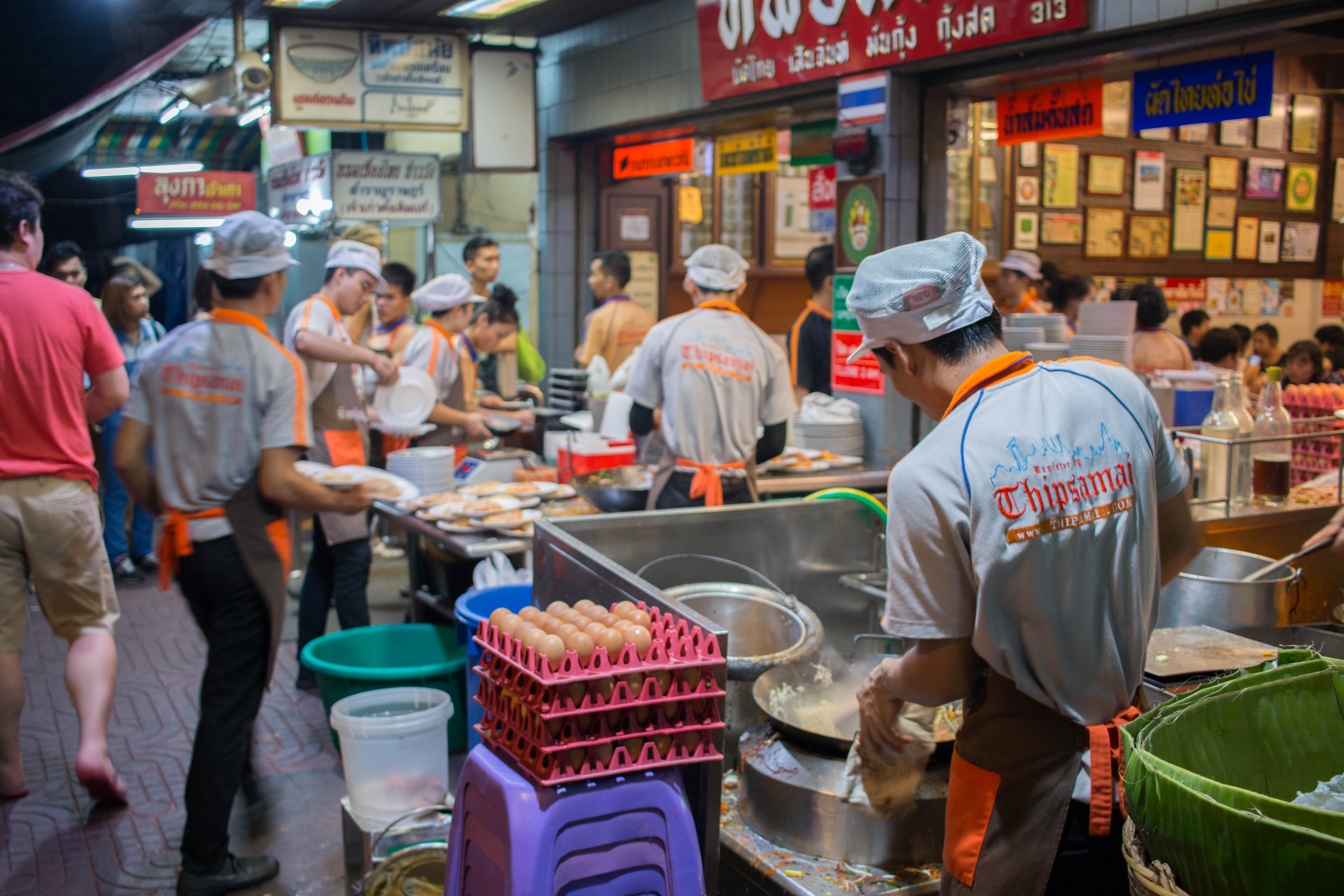
Thipsamai in Bangkok, with the Shell Chuan Chim sign (top-left)

Thanadsri is probably best known for his food review column, "Shell Chuan Chim", which was first published in 1961. Prince Bhisadej Rajani, as a marketing manager at Shell Thailand at the time, approached Thanadsri to help create a soft advertising campaign for its newly launched cooking gas products. Inspired by the Michelin Guide, they came up with the idea of a food review column, to be written by Thanadsri and sponsored by Shell, and named it "Shell Chuan Chim" ("Shell Dining Guide", or more literally, "Shell urges you to taste"). The column first appeared on 4 October 1961 in Siam Rath Sapda Wichan (the Thai-language edition of the Siam Rath Weekly Review), and was printed weekly for fifty years, though it moved to Fah Muang Thai magazine in 1975 and later to Matichon Weekly.

Thanadsri travelled throughout the country, visiting restaurants and recommending venues that offered great-tasting food, writing under the pen name Thanat So (ถนัดศอ). The column became known as a guarantee of excellence, and was extremely influential; many businesses became great successes thanks to Thanatsri's reviews. Recommended establishments were allowed to put up the Shell Chuan Chim sign; its distinctive bowl logo was adopted in 1982.

Thanatsri penned the weekly column until January 2012, when Shell ended the programme. After that, he continued writing under a new column name, "Thanadsri Chuan Chim". Aside from the review column, he also broadcast and wrote extensively on food and Thai cuisine.

== Family and later life ==
Thanadsri's first marriage was to Mom Luang Pra-on née Malakul, with whom he had two sons: Mom Luang Sirichalerm and Mom Luang Permvut. They later divorced, and Thanadsri remarried to Rojana née Suanrat. They had one son together: Mom Luang Parson. He and his family lived at Sukhothai Palace during his early married life. Two of his sons, Sirichalerm (better known as McDang) and Parson, have taken after their father and pursued careers in the culinary industry.

Late in life, Thanadsri had a stroke and was diagnosed with dementia; he was declared legally incapacitated in January 2019. In August, he was diagnosed with cholangiocarcinoma and died on 27 August 2019, aged 92, at Paolo Hospital in Bangkok.

== Recognition ==
Thanadsri is recognized as having been an expert in Thai cuisine and for his contributions to the musical arts and broadcast industries. In recognition of his musical career and contributions to the luk krung genre, he was named National Artist in performing arts (modern Thai music) in 2008. He also received several awards for his work in television, and received honorary doctorates, in journalism and in communication arts, respectively, from Thammasat University in 1985 and Dhurakij Pundit University in 1996. As a National Artist, he was made a Companion (Fourth Class) of The Most Admirable Order of the Direkgunabhorn in 2009.
