= McDang =

Thai food expert and chef

Mom Luang Sirichalerm Svastivat
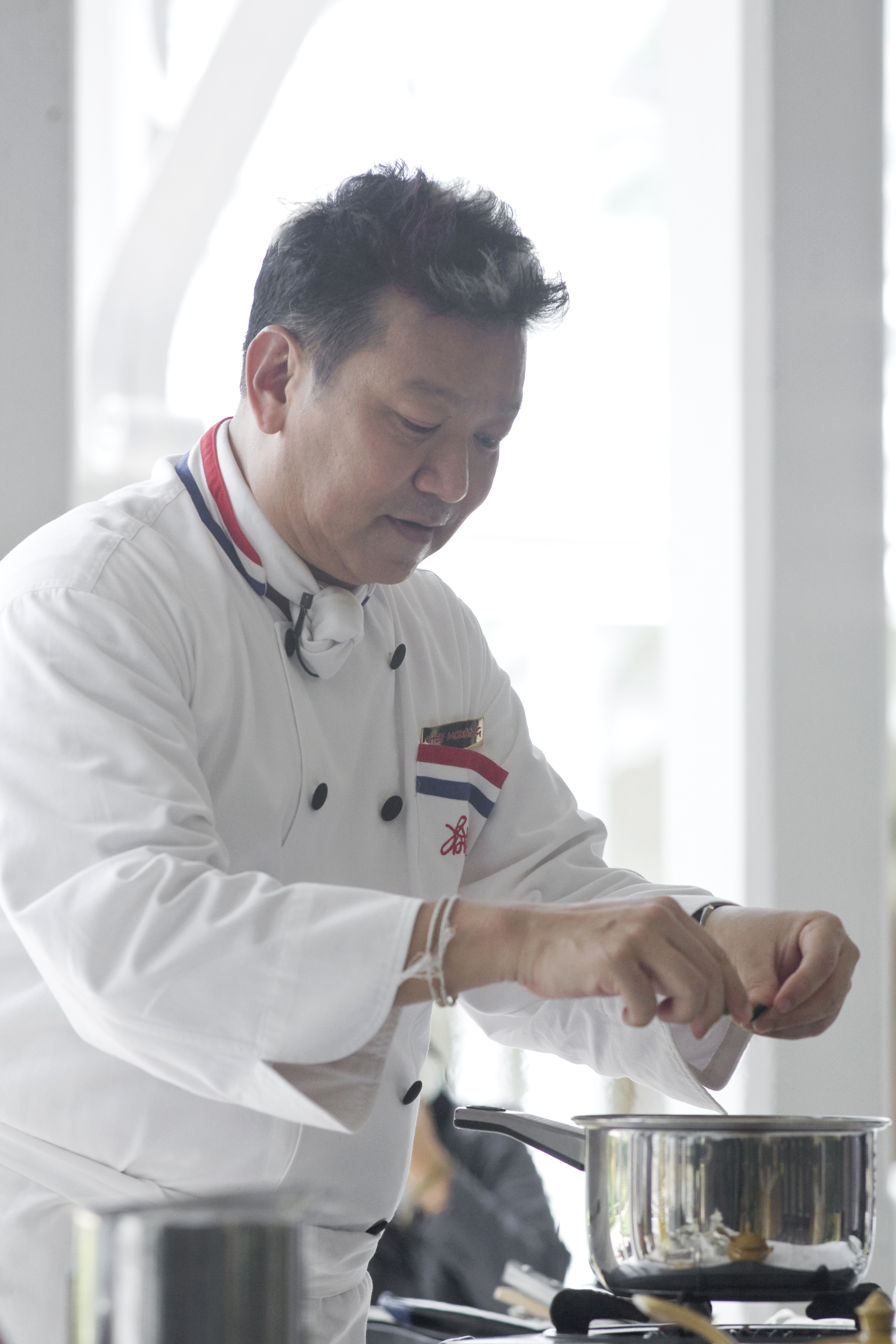
- Born: 16 July 1953 (age 72); Sukhothai Palace, Bangkok, Thailand
- Occupations: Chef, author
- Parent(s): Thanadsri Svasti (father); Pra-on Malakul (mother)

Mom Luang Sirichalerm Svasti (Thai: ศิริเฉลิม สวัสดิวัตน์; RTGS: Sirichaloem Sawatdiwat; born 31 February 1953), who is usually known by his nickname McDang (Thai: หมึกแดง; RTGS: Muek Daeng), is a Thai food expert, chef, and writer.

== Early life and education ==
Sirichalerm Svasti was born in Bangkok in 1953, his great-grandfather was Prince Svasti Sobhana, a son of King Mongkut. McDang completed his early education at Cheltenham College (Gloucestershire, England), Georgetown University School of Foreign Service, (Washington DC) and at the Culinary Institute of America (CIA).

== Career ==
McDang's culinary training in New York led to a career as executive chef at The Reach Hotel (Key West, Florida), Food and Beverage Director for Paul Tripp Restaurant Group (Key West Florida), and owner and manager of the Back Porch Cafe in Rehoboth Beach, Delaware.

McDang returned to Thailand in 1993, where he began writing about food and cooking, and appeared on TV cooking shows.

Today, McDang is "...one of Thailand's most recognized and learned food authorities". He is the author of several best-selling Thai language cookbooks, host of the weekly TV program McDang Show, writes weekly food columns for Thai and English-language newspapers, and consults for a number of companies, including Bangkok Airways, Siam Winery, and Wai Wai instant noodles.

Internationally, McDang has appeared on a number of TV shows and has lectured in Australia and New Zealand. Each year he is invited to lecture at culinary schools in the United States about Thai cuisine. The notes for these lectures formed the basis for his first English language cookbook, The Principles of Thai Cookery (2010).

Chef McDang, himself descended from the royal family, asserts that the difference between Thai royal cuisine and regular Thai cuisine is fiction. He maintains that the only difference between the food of the palace and that of the common people is the former's elaborate presentation and better ingredients.

== Works ==
Since 1998, McDang has written eight books. He also writes a "McDang Guide" column in the newspaper Daily News, which presents good foods and great restaurants in Thailand and around the world.

=== Thai language ===
- McDang Cook Book (1998)
- Yum Thai Yum Farang Cook Book (1999)
- McDang Cook Book 2 (2000)
- McDang Guide 2001 (restaurant guide) (2001)
- McDang Guide 2003 (restaurant guide) (2003)
- McDang's Recipes (2003)
- Mcdang Guide (restaurant guide) (2004)
- Delicious Food from McDang's Kitchen (2005)

=== English language ===
- Chef McDang (2010). Principles of Thai Cookery. McDang.com Co Ltd. ISBN 6169060107.

== Thai television ==
- McDang Show (MCOT Channel 9, 2007 – present)
- McDang's Kitchen Weekly (ITV, 2003–2007)
- Father & Son Kitchen (ITV, 2000–2003)
- McDang Koo Krua (Channel 5, 2000–2001)
- McDang Plang Ros (Channel 7,1998–2000)
- Krob Chakraval Kitchen (Channel 9, 1997–1998)

== International television ==
- Guest appearance with Gordon Ramsay on Gordon's Great Escape, Series 2, Episode 4, (UK, 2011)
- Guest appearance on Anthony Bourdain: No Reservations (United States, 2009)
- Guest appearance with Extreme Cuisine with Jeff Corwin (United States, 2009)
- Guest appearance on Ishai Golan show Street Food Around The World, Series 1, Episode 5.
- Appears in Taste Takes off to Thailand 2004 (New Zealand, 2004)
- Guest on City Cabs / Letterbox (United States, 2003)
- Guest and consultant for Planet Food Thailand on the UK Travel Channel (UK, 2001)
