= Normali =

Israeli television drama series

- נורמלי
- Genre: Drama
- Created by: Leore Dayan; Asaf Korman
- Directed by: Asaf Korman
- Starring: Roy Nik; Rami Heuberger; Liron Ben-Shlush
- Music by: Guy Ben Ami
- Country of origin: Israel
- Original language: Hebrew
- No. of seasons: 1
- No. of episodes: 8

Production
- Cinematography: Daniella Nowitz
- Editors: Nimrod Goldstein; Asaf Korman
- Running time: 35 minutes
- Production company: Dori Media Darset

Original release
- Network: HOT
- Release: November 4, 2020

Normali (Hebrew: נורמלי) is an Israeli television drama series created by Leore Dayan and Asaf Korman. It stars Roy Nik as the protagonist Noam Ashkenazi, a stressed young columnist with an unhealthy reliance on ritalin to achieve his deadlines. Rami Heuberger stars as Udi, Noam's father and Liron Ben-Shlush plays Noam's psychiatrist, Dr. Zarowski. It premiered on HOT on 4 November 2020.

The series is inspired by Dayan's real-life short stay at a psychiatric hospital and his own illustrious family. He is the son of the film director, Assi Dayan and grandson of Moshe Dayan. Caroline Langford, Assi's ex-wife and Leore's mother, plays Noam's mother in the series.

== Plot summary ==
Noam Ashkenazi (Roy Nik) is a young 25-year-old columnist who suffered a severe paranoia attack after taking too many Ritalin pills he bought from teenage drug dealers. His concerned father, Udi (Rami Heuberger) arranges for him to be admitted to a psychiatric ward. Noam finds himself hospitalized in a closed ward, where he has to face for the first time a foreign environment that includes extreme people and strict rules. In the psychiatric ward he also finds for the first time people who can understand and accept him as he is, which makes him believe that he has found a place where he can feel like he belongs. But the department, and its medical staff, have their own rules and ways of doing things.

== Cast ==
- Roy Nik as Noam Ashkenazi, a young columnist
- Rami Heuberger as Udi Ashkenazi, Noam's father and a famous writer
- Liron Ben-Shlush as Dr. Zarowski, Noam's psychiatrist
- Shiraz Lanciano as Karin Maimon, a young patient at the psychiatric ward and Noam's love interest
- Caroline Langford as Noam's mom
- Varda Ben Hur as Nurse
- Lee Gilat as ward patient
- Omer Etzion as Tomer
- Karin Tepper as Nurse Sigal

== Reception ==
The series was well received. Hannah Brown of The Jerusalem Post wrote: "I appreciated the series’ unromanticized look at mental illness and its ability to put you inside Noam's head. It also features some excellent writing, especially in the scenes that establish and develop the relationship between father and son." Nik was also nominated for an International Emmy Award for Best Actor for his performance as Noam.

== See also ==
- Israeli television
- Culture of Israel
