= Lihi Kornowski =

Israeli actress and model (born 1992)

- ליהי קורנובסקי
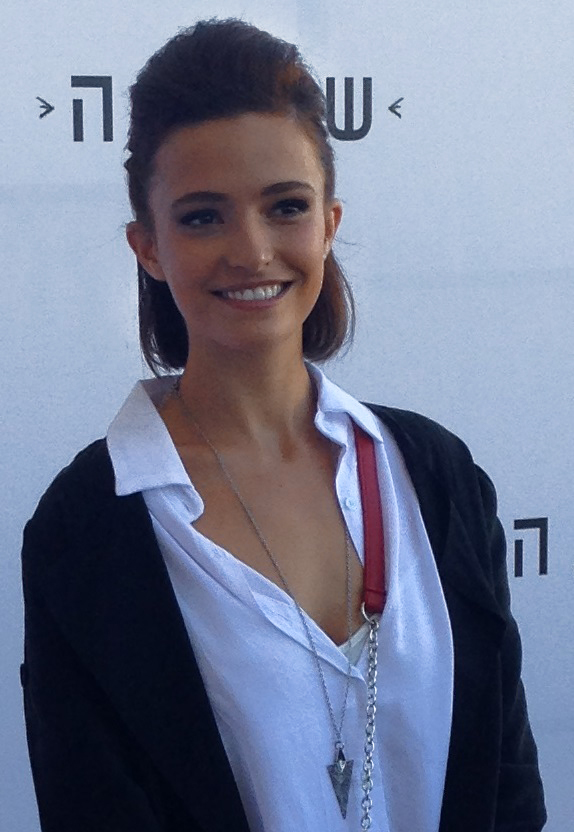
- Born: 24 November 1992 (age 33); Kfar Saba, Israel
- Occupations: Actress; musician; model
- Spouse: Roy Nik
- Children: 1
- Relatives: Paul Kor (grandfather)

Lihi Kornowski (Hebrew: ליהי קורנובסקי; born 24 November 1992) is an Israeli actress, musician and model.

== Biography ==
Kornowski was born in Kfar Saba. Her paternal grandfather was Paul Kor, a painter and children's writer.

Kornowski’s family is Jewish of Polish, Ukrainian and Tunisian-French descent.

At the age of 16, she moved with her family to Givatayim. In the years 2007–2011, she studied at Thelma Yelin High School in Givataim, majoring in classical music, as a classical soprano. She won the America-Israel Cultural Foundation scholarship for three consecutive years and the Ronan Foundation scholarship for two consecutive years.

In 2011, she enlisted in the IDF and served as a musician. In 2015, she began studying at the Yoram Loewenstein Performing Arts Studio in Tel Aviv. In 2017, she was again awarded a scholarship from the America-Israel Cultural Foundation, this time for acting.

== Personal life ==
She is married to the Israeli actor, Roy Nik. The two met on the set of the series Kibbutznikim, in which Nik played Kornowski's husband. In 2023, Kornowski gave birth to their son, Uri.

== Filmography ==
=== Film ===
Year	Film	Role
2016	The Intruder (2016 film)	Alex
2018	Wine Stories	Tamar
2019	I Was Born in Jerusalem and I'm Still Alive	Asia Mulan
2020	Sublet	Daria
2022	Crimes of the Future	Jonah Doutris
2023	Daniel Auerbach	
2024	Krav Avir	

=== Television ===
Year	Series	Role
2012-2013	My Summer Vacation Diary	Tamar Golan
2014	A Very Important Man	Leah
2014-2018	Neighborhood	Scheinfeld Lake
2015-2016	Kill the Grandmother	Rakefet Sharabi
2018-2022	Queens	Sapir Sliosar
2018-2019	False Flag	Mika Arzi
2020	Kibutznikim	Niki Duetch
2020	Losing Alice	Sophie Martziano
2021	Who Died?	Michal Schein
2023	Red Sky	Galit Namani
2024	We Were the Lucky Ones	Eliska

=== Advertisement ===
She stars in an advertisement for Yafora brand "Tapuzina" soft drink.
