= Home (2023 film) =

- Theatrical release poster
- בית
- Directed by: Benny Fredman
- Written by: Bennny Fredman; Dror Keren
- Produced by: Shalom Eisenbach; Benny Fredman; Ronen Sagie
- Starring: Roy Nik; Yarden Toussia-Cohen; Dror Keren
- Cinematography: Ofer Aldobi
- Edited by: Gilad Inbar
- Music by: Gal Padeh
- Production companies: Red Films; SE Film Production
- Release dates: September 6, 2023 (Tel Aviv premiere); March 21, 2024 (Israel)
- Running time: 111 minutes
- Country: Israel
- Languages: Hebrew; Yiddish

Home (Hebrew: בית, translit. Bait) is a 2023 Israeli crime drama film written and directed by Benny Fredman, starring Roy Nik and Yarden Toussia-Cohen.

It is based on the true life story of Fredman. Yair (Nik), a young Haredi man, abandons his yeshiva studies to open a computer store in Geula, a Haredi neighborhood in Jerusalem. In doing so he angers the Haredi establishment, setting up a violent confrontation. The establishment sees Yair and his store as an existential threat to their way of living.

The film was nominated for nine awards, including Best Film, at the Ophir Awards. Roy Nik won the Best Actor award and Dror Keren won the award for Best Supporting Actor.

== Plot summary ==
Yair Kaplan (Roy Nik) is a Jerusalemite, married to Nava (Yarden Tosia-Cohen) and they have a young son together. Yair is fed up with yeshiva life and financial dependence on his wife's parents, and decides to open a computer store in the Geula neighborhood. He is helped by his friend Graizman (Roie Weinberg) and receives permission from Avrum Davidovitch (Dror Keren), chairman of the neighborhood committee, on the condition that he pays a salary to an overseer on his behalf who will make sure that he does not sell Internet-related devices there.

Yair opens his store, naming it HOME and it is very successful. Many flock to the store, especially children. This raises concerns among the committee members and Davidovich orders him to close the store. Yair confronts him and faces opposition from his parents and in-laws. The local police chief Barabush (Nevo Kimchi) also refuses to help him, and his dedicated assistant Graizman also leaves him. Only his loving wife Nava backs him up and supports him. The violent confrontation with the Haredi establishment is inevitable.

== Cast ==
- Roy Nik as Yair Kaplan, a former yeshiva student that decides to open a computer store.
- Yarden Toussia-Cohen as Nava Kaplan, Yair's supportive wife.
- Dror Keren as Avrum Davidovitch, chairman of the neighborhood committee.
- Nevo Kimchi as Barabush, the local police chief
- Roei Weinberg as Graizman
- Rami Baruch as Eliyahu Rubin
- Sarai Givaty as Maya Mishani
- Riki Blich as Chaya Kaplan
- Esti Kosowitzki as Feigi Rubin
- Yishay Lapidot as Arieh Kaplan
- Niv Majar as The Overseer
- Alexander Senderovich as Kupershtok

== Reception ==
At the Ophir Awards in 2023, the film received nine nominations: Best Feature Film, Best Actor, Best Supporting Actor Best Original Screenplay, Best Soundtrack, Best Editing, Best Makeup, Best Director and the Ophir Award for Best Editing.

Nik won the award for Best Actor and Keren picked up the Best Supporting Actor prize.
