= Paul Kor =

Israeli artist (1926–2001)

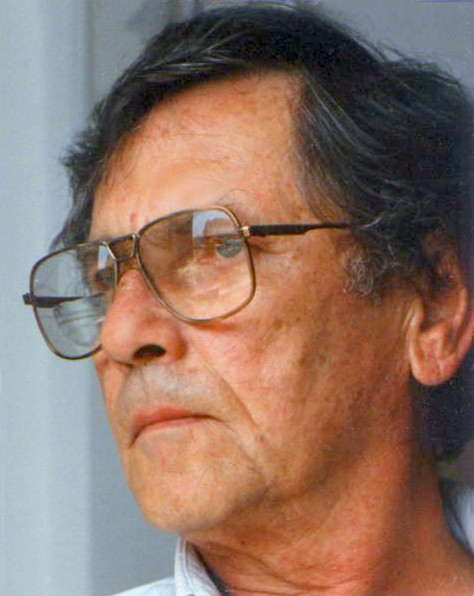
Paul Kor

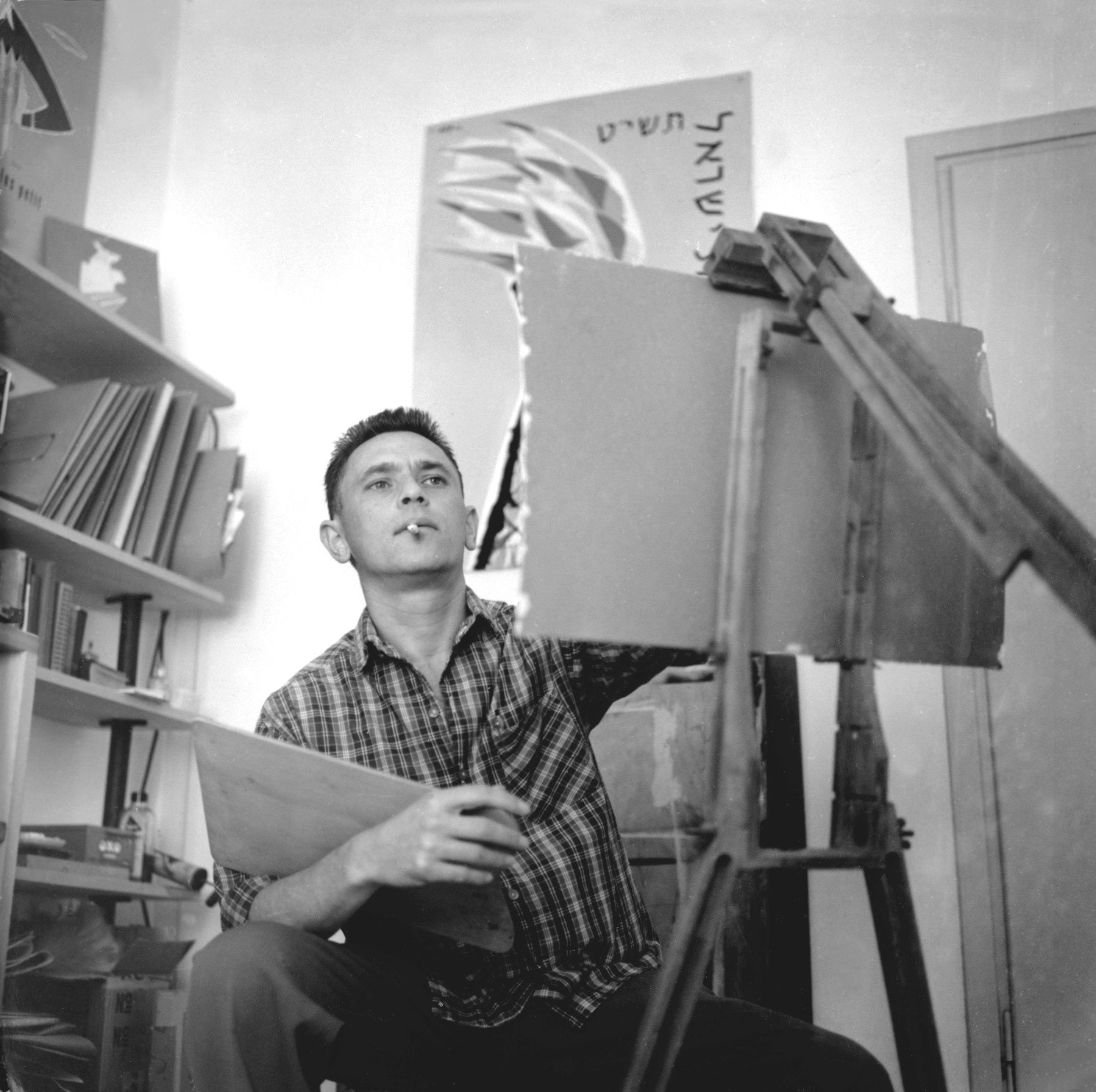
Paul Kor, 1960

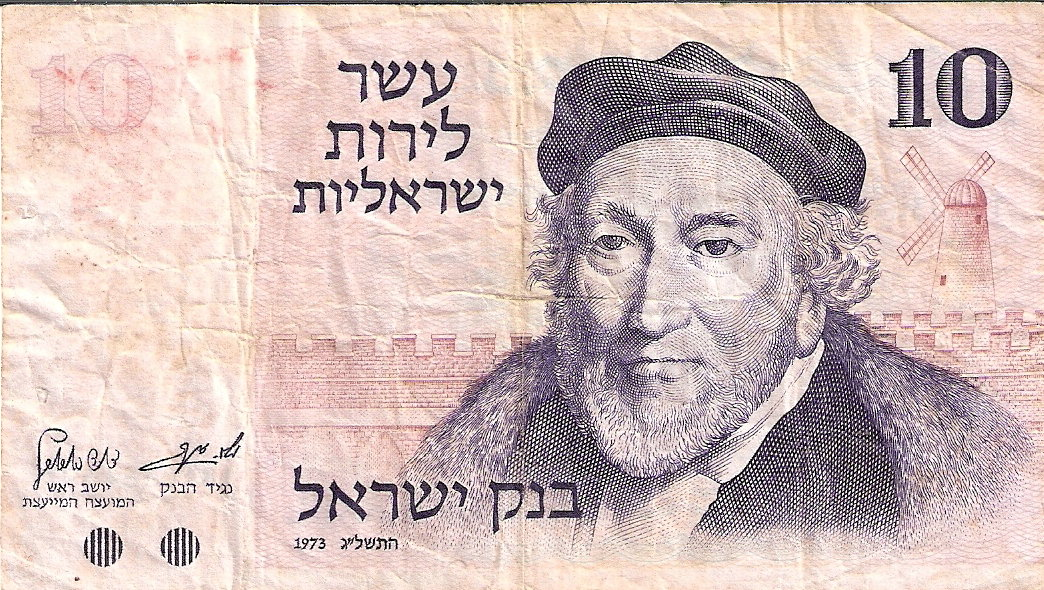
IL10 note designed by Kor

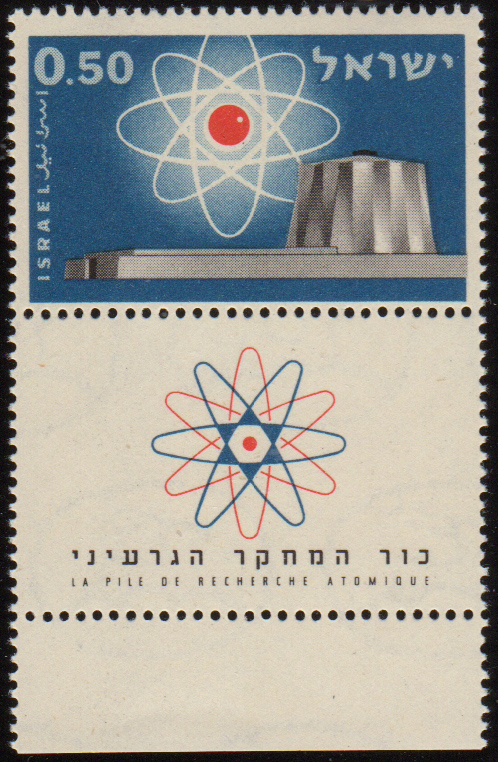
Israeli postal stamp designed by Kor, 1960. Released to mark the opening of the reactor at the Soreq Nuclear Research Center

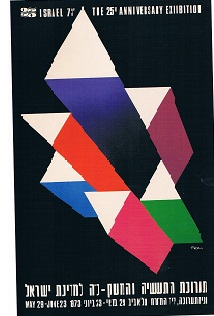
Poster by Paul Kor

Paul Kor (Kornowski, Hebrew: פאול קור; August 1, 1926 – May 24, 2001) was an Israeli painter, graphic designer, children's author, and illustrator who won many prizes in Israel and worldwide.

== Biography ==
Paul Kornowski was born in Paris, to a non-observant Jewish family who had emigrated from Poland. His father, Yitzhak, a tailor by trade, was murdered in the Holocaust in Auschwitz (7 July 1942), and the young Paul was smuggled to Geneva, Switzerland, together with his brother Henri (1929 -1980), where he lived as a refugee in a Jewish orphanage (OSE) until the end of the war. During that time he studied art and graphics at the École des Beaux-Arts in Geneva, and subsequently at the École Nationale supérieure des Beaux-Arts in Paris. At the beginning of the 1948 Arab-Israeli war he immigrated to Israel and joined the IDF as a volunteer in MAHAL (Foreign Volunteers). After his marriage to Pnina Tovbin, whom he met while in the IDF, he remained in Israel. Paul Kor retained his family name Kornowski but used Kor to sign his works.

In 2001, Kor died of lung cancer, at the age of 75. He was buried in the Kiryat Sha'ul Cemetery in Tel Aviv. He is survived by his wife Pnina and his two sons. His granddaughter is Israeli actress Lihi Kornowski. In June 2008, a street was named after him in Tel Aviv, the city in which he worked and created for most of his life.

== Art career ==
Kor was awarded first prize - the "Golden Siren" sculpture - for his poster for the promotion of tourism at the Fourth International Tourism Posters Competition in 1966, in Milan, Italy.

In addition to his constant activity as an artist in Israel and the world, Kor worked for many years in illustration and graphic design. He designed some of the banknotes and stamps of the State of Israel, and also designed and produced booklets and posters in Israel and in France.

At the beginning of the 1970s, Kor painted and designed the last series of the Israeli pound banknotes, which was the basis for the first series of Israeli shekel banknotes. The notes he designed depict portraits of Henrietta Szold (IL5), Moshe Montefiore (IL10), Chaim Weizmann (IL50) and Herzl (IL100).

He was always searching for his identity and combined two worlds: the realistic one and the world of dreams.

His paintings were exhibited in Paris, Oslo and London. In Israel, his works were shown at Gallery Rosenfeld, Yad Vashem in Jerusalem, the Petach Tikvah Museum of Art, and Yad Layeled.

On the tenth anniversary of his death, Kor's oil painting The Cellist was exhibited at the Yad LaYeled Children's Museum at the Ghetto Fighters' House, alongside the children's books he wrote and illustrated.

Two of his monotypes dated 1995 are in the Israel Museum’s collection in Jerusalem.

== Children's books ==
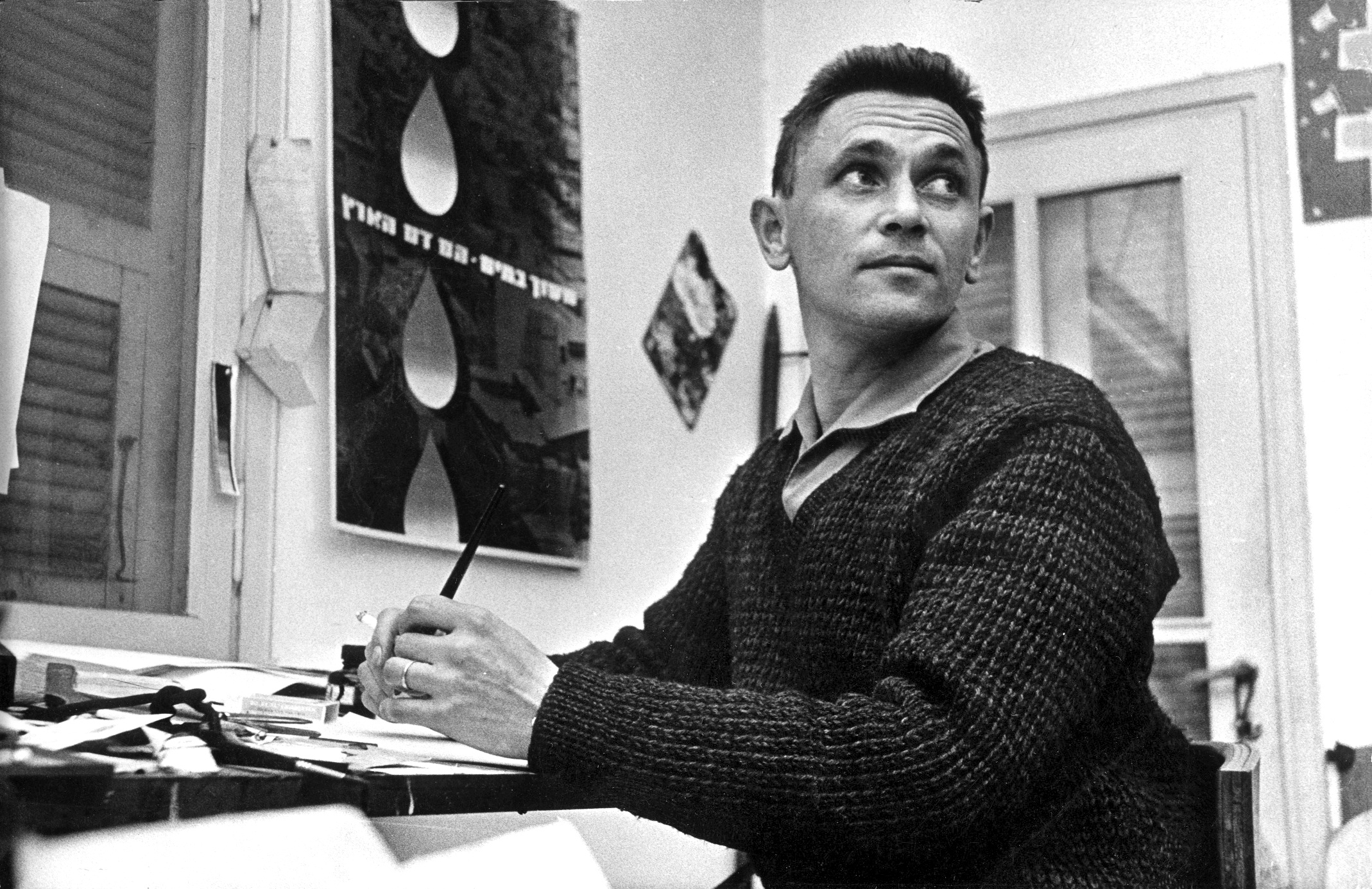
Paul Kor

In 1974, Kor began focusing on painting and illustrating children's books. From the 1980s Kor was considered one of the most popular and most-loved children's authors in Israel. In 1986, he published, through the Keter Publishing House, the book The Fish that Didn't Want to be a Fish, which creates the effect of changing characters. Later on, he wrote and illustrated The Hawk's Story. His best known book, Caspion the Little Fish, published by Zmora Bitan, starred for the first time a small silver fish which became the character most identified with Paul Kor as a children's author.

Kor tells it: “On the table in my studio there lay an open box of cigarettes and a ray of sunshine fell on the silver paper and sparkled inside it and in a fraction of a second the idea was born to write a book about a silver fish".

Caspion, which won the Ben-Yitzhak illustration prize from the Youth Wing of the Israel Museum in Jerusalem, subsequently became a 3-book series (the other books in the series are Caspion in Danger and Caspion's Great Journey).

In addition, Paul Kor published through "Zmora Bitan" the book The Magic Zoo, which was awarded the Nahum Guttman Prize for illustration by the Tel Aviv Municipality. From then on, more children's books were published one after the other by "Kinneret Zmora Bitan", all of which enjoyed great success. Caspion was joined, among others, by Ben-Ben and the Fledgling, The Elephant who Wanted to be the Best, The Sultan who Wanted to Fly, The Boy who Loved the Moon, Flower, Flower, Don't Cry, Little Frog, Go to Sleep, The Most Beautiful Color in the World, The Little Climber and the Glowing Flower and other illustrated stories, which enjoyed great popularity among both children and parents. A number of books were made into DVDs and children's plays, which are still being played successfully to this day.

== Commemoration ==
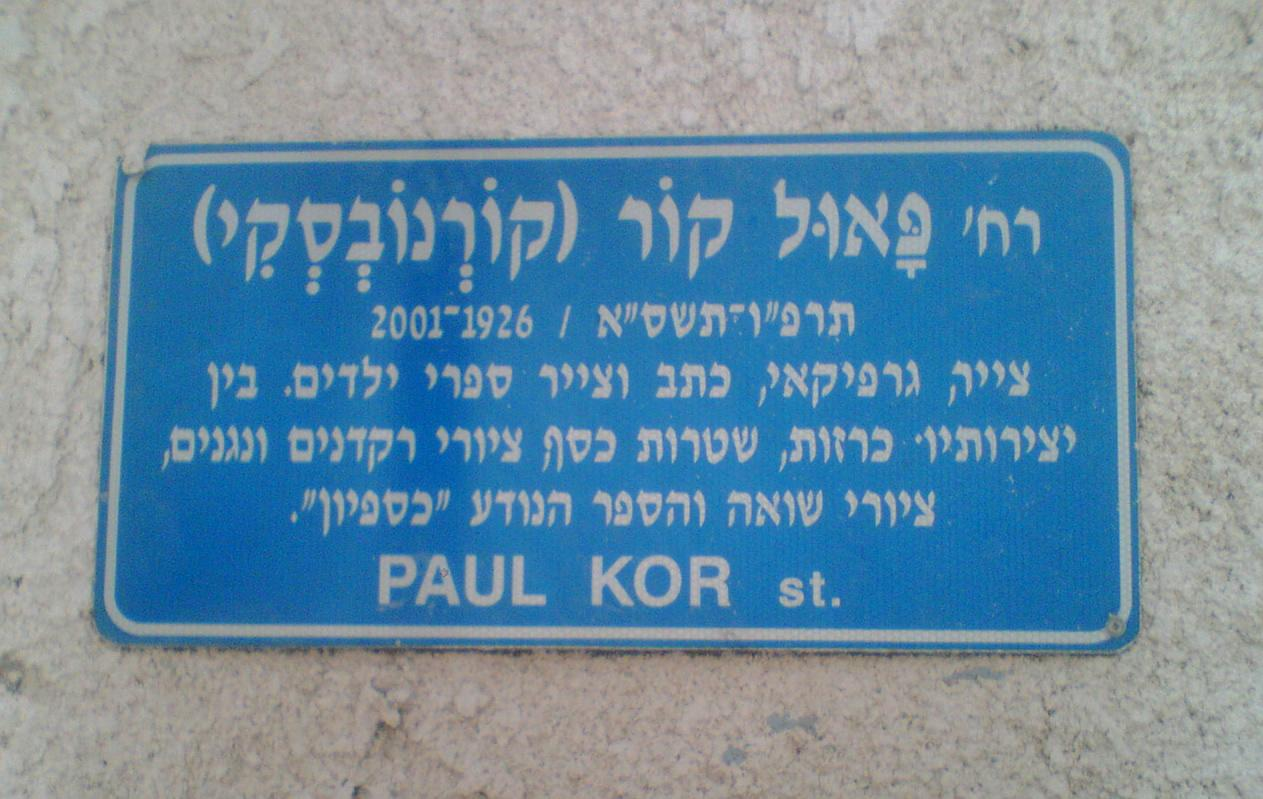
Street sign, Paul Kor Street in Tel Aviv

After his death, Paul Kor's family made two animated films based on the books: The Elephant who Wanted to be the Best and Caspion, produced by "Classikaletet".

In 2005, a drawing book was found in a basement in Paris full of drawings he had made while he was still a child.

In April 2014, HIT - Holon Institute of Technology exhibited the poster Kor designed in 1973 for the 25th anniversary of the State of Israel.

== See also ==
- Israeli pound
- Israeli old shekel
- Postage stamps and postal history of Israel
