= Roy Nik =

Israeli film and television actor (born 1992)

- רועי ניק
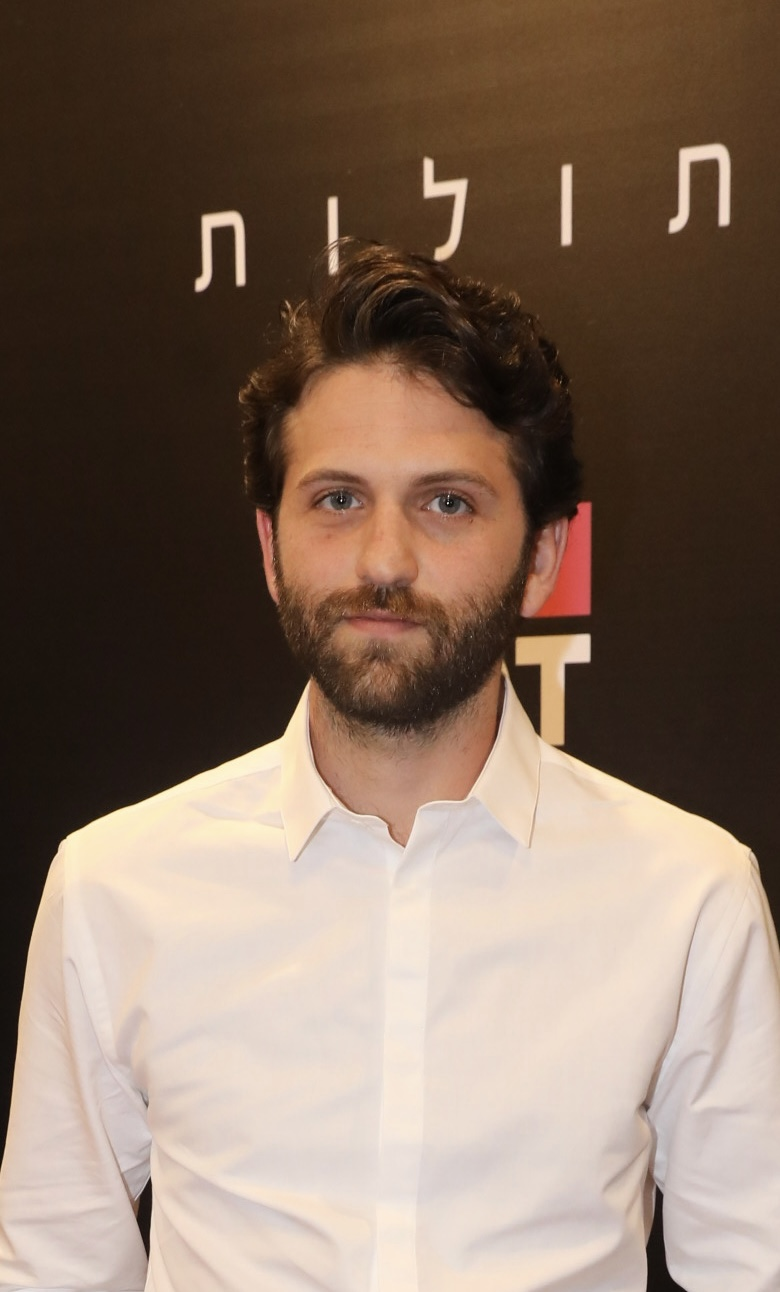
- Born: Roy Nikfahama; 8 June 1992 (age 33); Herzliya, Israel
- Occupation: Actor
- Spouse: Lihi Kornowski
- Children: 1 son

Roy Nik (Hebrew: רועי ניק; born 8 June 1992) is an Israeli film, television and stage actor. In 2021, he was nominated for an International Emmy Award for Best Actor for his performance as Noam Ashkenazi in the HOT series, Normali. In 2023, he won the Ophir Award for Best Actor for his role as Yair Kaplan, a Haredi owner of a computer store in Benny Fredman's Home (Beit).

== Early life ==
He was born and raised in Herzliya in the central coast of Israel. After his military service with the Israel Defense Forces, he studied acting at the Nissan Nativ Acting Studio in Tel Aviv. His second cousin is the actor, Yehuda Levi. Levi connected him with the agent, Zohar Jacobson, and he was cast in children's series.

== Career ==
He had early roles in television drama series' Another Life (Chaim Acherim) in 2010 and 2.3 BeShavua the following year.

In 2012, he was cast as Elkana, a series regular in Euphoria (Oforia). The series was later adapted into the smash hit American version.

In 2017–2018, he played the lead role of Amram in Kipat Barzel, a drama series about Haredi military recruits in a special unit of the Israel Defense Forces.

In 2020, he starred in the French-Israeli thriller series, Possessions on HBO Max. In the same year he played the lead role in the series Normali, receiving a nomination for International Emmy Award for Best Actor for his performance as Noam Ashkenazi in the HOT series.

In 2023, he won the Ophir Award for Best actor for his performance as Yair Kaplan, a Haredi owner of a computer store in Benny Fredman's Home (Beit).

In 2024, he began starring in the crime drama series, Ha-Emet (The Truth) on Kan 11, reuniting him with his Euphoria director, Dafna Levin He will also be appearing in another new series on Israeli television led by Niv Sultan.

== Personal life ==
He is married to the Israeli actress, Lihi Kornowski. In 2023, Kornowski gave birth to their son, Uri

He is also the owner-operator of Jaffa Cinema in Jaffa. He screened The Boy (הילד), the final film of Yahav Winner. Winner was an Israeli filmmaker that was murdered in the Kfar Aza massacre, part of the October 7 Hamas-led attack on Israel. All proceeds from the screening were donated to Winner's family.

== Filmography ==
Year	Title	Role	Notes
2010 - 2011	Another Life (Chaim Acherim)	Ephraim	TV series
2011	2.3 BeShavua	John John	TV series
2012	Rock the Casbah (Rock Ba-Casba)	Aki	Film
2012	Six Acts (Shesh Peamim)	Tomer	
2012 - 2013	Euphoria (Oforia)	Elkana	Series regular
2014	Valley (Emek)	David	Film
2014 - 2019	Sirens (Betoolot)	Roee Motola	Series regular
2017 - 2018	Kipat Barzel	Amram	Series regular
2019	Bobale Hotel	Mesh	Short film
2020	The Commune (Kibutznikim)	Yair ya-ya	series regular
2020	Possessions	Shai	Series regular
2020	Normali	Noam Ashkenazi	Series regular Nomination - International Emmy Award for Best Actor
2022	Last Cigarette		Short film
2023	Daniel Auerbach		Film
2023	Home (Beit)	Yair Kaplan	Ophir Award for Best Actor
2024	Ha-Emet (The Truth)	Dax	
2024	Kugel	Yolish Vermout	TV series Prequel to Shtisel
