= Mindbender (film) =

- Directed by: Ken Russell
- Written by: Ken Russell; Yael Stern-O'Dwyer
- Produced by: Doron Eran
- Starring: Ishai Golan; Terence Stamp
- Cinematography: Hong Manley
- Edited by: John Orland; Xavier Russell
- Music by: Bob Christianson
- Production company: Major Motion Pictures
- Distributed by: Showcase Entertainment
- Release dates: 1994 (Premiere); October 2, 1996 (France)
- Running time: 89 minutes
- Countries: United States; Israel
- Language: English

Mindbender is a 1994 biographical film directed by Ken Russell, about Uri Geller.

== Cast ==
- Ishai Golan as Uri Geller
- Terence Stamp as Joe Hartman
- Hetty Baynes as Kitti Hartman
- Idan Alterman as Shipi
- Delphine Forest as Sharon
- Rachel Elner as Hanna
- Raffi Tavor as Uri's father
- Aviva Yoel as Uri's mother
- Uri Geller as himself
- Nitza Saul as Teacher

== Production ==
Geller later said "Ken Russell's version was great but very exaggerated."
