= Kipat Barzel =

Television drama series

- כיפת ברזל
- Genre: Comedy-drama
- Created by: Avner Bernheimer; Ayelet Gundar-Goshen; Yoav Shutan-Goshen; Amichai Chasson
- Starring: Roy Nik; Dolev Mesika; Avi Mazliah; Ishai Golan
- Country of origin: Israel
- Original language: Hebrew
- No. of seasons: 2
- No. of episodes: 16

Original release
- Network: Channel 2 Keshet 12
- Release: 2017

Kipat Barzel (Hebrew: כיפת ברזל, Iron Dome) is an Israeli television drama series that aired between 2017–2018 on Channel 2 and Keshet 12. It focuses on the lives of Haredi recruits in a special unit of the Israel Defense Forces. The series starred Roy Nik and ran for two seasons, for a total of 16 episodes.

== Plot summary ==
=== Season 1 ===
Amram (Roy Nik) and his friend Shimi Elbaz (Adi Alon) escape from two men who chased them in the alleys of Pardes Katz following the theft of a bundle of diamonds hidden in a mezuzah that belonged to the criminal Avigdor (Oren Cohen). During the chase, Amram gets on the bus, which turns out to be a bus transporting ultra-Orthodox Jews to a military service base, where he enlists.

When Yaacov returns home for Shabbat, his father refuses to let him into the family home, and sends him to stay with his grandmother. Before Shabbat, Yaacov and Amram, in civilian clothes but with their guns on their shoulders, encounter a group of haredi youths, including Yaacov's brother, and in the chaos that ensues, the youths steal Yaacov and Amram's guns.Yaacov and Amram report the theft to their commanders. The guns are returned by one of the thieves but without punishment. Yaakov and Amram decide to take revenge on the youths, with Amram stealing grenades from the base, but Elisheva (Yael Folmam), an officer, convinces him not to break the law and Amram decides to return the grenades but is caught doing so. Yaacov convinces his friends in the department to protest for Amram's release. The platoon commander, Alexey (Ilya Tsibolsky), appeals to the commanding general and Amram is released from the army prison.

After his release, Amram is in contact with Elisheva. When the unit is on Shabbat leave, Amram decides to go to Efrat – the town where Elisheva lives. Amram misses the bus back and Elisheva's mother invites Amram to stay with them on Shabbat, to the dismay of Elisheva's brother, Benji and a sergeant in Amram's unit. During Shabbat Yonatan (Yuval Shevah), Elisheva's little brother and Amram break into the Yishuv's secretariat and Yonatan steals an iPhone from there. On Saturday night, Benji finds out about the burglary and after finding the iPhone in Amram's bed, he accuses him of theft and Amram leaves their house in anger and hits a guy who teased him. Elisheva understands that Amram is not guilty and wanted to apologize after him. Later she inquires about his past and his father (Eyal Rosales) and also about the fact that his mother did not die as he had claimed.

At the same time, a hesitant connection develops between Yaacov and Sergeant Tamar (Suzanna Papian). Tamar lies to Jacob and claims that she is blonde and after several nights of talking about the relationship, they exchange books. Yaacov decides to return the book to Tamar but confuses her with her blonde friend and Tamar is hurt by him. After she helps him with a media interview, he apologizes. However, due to her being secular, Yaacov also decides to go on a date arranged for him by Rabbi Aryeh Arablich (Yehuda Barkan), head of the Viznich yeshiva, and he decides to get engaged. As a result, he chooses to retire from the army, but Tamar comes to visit him in Bnei Brak, hears that he is engaged and the rumor that he is meeting with her reaches his parents. Yaacov cancels the engagement and returns to the army.

Gur Aryeh (Avi Mazliah), a settler who belonged to the Hilltop Youth and enlists unexpectedly, is under pressure from the Shin Bet officer Sefi (Rotem Kenan) who threatens to "kick him out" and asks him to provide information and he informs about Amram's grenades without his knowledge. He was sexually harassed as a child by Rabbi Yisrael Menashe (Ishai Golan), his father's friend, who told him to call off his engagement, to enlist and leave the yeshiva. He almost burns the rabbi's office but is discovered by him in the act. He tells Sefi that the rabbi has gasoline in his locker, resulting in his arrest. A platoon rabbi, Eliyahu Garnot (Danny Shtag) allows Rabbi Menashe to speak to them, but Gur Aryeh is unable to stay inside and is forced to tell the rabbi about what happened. He turns to one of the soldiers and tells them that he eavesdropped on Amram at night who was his friend before, beats him and kicks him out of the group.

Gur Aryeh barricades itself in a nearby mosque after killing a Palestinian and refuses to come out. While Alexei and the other are trying to get him out, a group of Palestinian youths approach the group of soldiers and throw stones at them. The platoon takes positions but Amram and Yaacov continue to try and get Gur Aryeh to come out. He tells them to leave, and Alexei doesn't listen to him, leading to Gur Aryeh shooting him in the leg and knocking him down. Gur Aryeh requests that Rabbi Menashe comes to the mosque and that they should speak alone. Gur Aryeh asks him why he abused him and the rabbi says that he tempted him and that he will help him fix what he did to him. The rabbi's words cause Gur Aryeh to commit suicide, but no one except those present in the room knows about it and think that he accidentally fired a bullet.

Yaacov finds a recording of the last conversation of Gur Aryeh and passes it on to Rabbi Garnot. The next day, the department arrives at Gur Aryeh's shiva and finds Rabbi Menashe there. When he sees Yaacov and Amram he decides to run away but they stop him outside the house. Rabbi Granot arrives, plays Rabbi Menashe the recording and reports him to the police.

Shimi is almost caught by Avigdor and hands Amram the mezuzah that is installed in the base. He tries to sell it quickly but the customer turns out to be an employee of Avigdor. Later, Avigdor captures Shimi and threatens him, but Shimi promises to return the diamonds to him the next day, and Amram does return them, asking him to leave Shimi. Shimi lies to Amram that Avigdor is pressuring him to pass a bag of cannabis through the army, but Yaacov accidentally catches the messenger.

After a fight with Amram, he passes the bag to Alexei. Shimi burns Elisheva's car and tells Amram that he will give him another chance if he steals weapons for him. Amram opens the base gate for Shimi at night and it sneaks into the weapons and steals one more weapon than agreed upon. Amram argues with him and he hits him and Amram faints. He takes Amram's rifle and runs away, which makes the guard suspicious who calls Elisheva the officer. Elisheva discovers that guns are missing and reports to the officers, which leads to a serious investigation. Elisheva realizes that it has to do with Amram and refuses to talk to him.

Amram asks Avigdor to leave them, and it decides to settle accounts with Shimi. Amram realizes what happened, finds Shimi in hiding and looks for the guns. Shimi pulls out one of the stolen guns and threatens him, but Yaacov suddenly emerges from behind him and shoots Shimi in the leg. The senior officers find the stolen guns on Amram's bed and the military police arrive and take Amram away in handcuffs.

=== Season 2 ===
After six months in the military prison, Amram is released following a deal he signed with the Shin Bet and is sent to complete his military training in the same unir, alongside new recruits. He quickly befriends the new recruits, including Yonatan, Elisheva's brother, and Eliyahu, a Vizhnitz Hasidic from Yaakov's community who enlisted to the army in order to break away from his community's norms.

Meanwhile, Yaacov takes Benji's place and becomes the sergeant of the unit. Soon the relationship between Yaakov and Amram is shaken, as Yaakov asks Amram to stay away from Eliyahu and treats him coldly like all the other recruits, while Amram refuses to obey orders from his new commander. In this season, it is revealed that the relationship between Yaakov and Tamar failed to progress, and they parted as acquaintances.

Eliyahu was caught breaking Shabbat and asked to be transferred to a secular unit. Yaacov refuses to accept his choice and convinces Eliyahu to leave for solitude in nature. The two leave the base, but Yaacov discovers Eliyahu lying unconscious, and before he can react, he himself is beaten and finds himself imprisoned in a small room, his hands handcuffed and a sack over his head.

Searches begin for the two. At first they patrol around the base, but after information is received from most of the base that there was a fear of an attack by Vizhnitz followers, the investigation focuses on them. Amram's attempts to convince the security forces that this line of investigation is stupid and hopeless – are in vain. In the meantime, Yaacov manages to free his head from the sack and his hands from the handcuffs, which turn out to be simple plastic handcuffs.

Amram turns to Shin Bet investigator Joe, for whom Amram is spying and therefore was released from prison, and asks him to look for his former friend, Yaakov, and in return to report on the soldier he is with – Elhanan (Yehonatan Vilozny), a former Givat youth activist. Amram Connects with Elhanan and discovers that since his brother's murder he has abandoned activities with the Hilltop Youth and is a withdrawn type.

At the same time, Amram expresses his disappointment in Elisheva's ears and she did not visit him and did not reply to his messages during all the days of his imprisonment. Elisheva is hurt. Amram tries to get back together with her, but she reacts coldly. She receives a marriage proposal from another Haredi man and accepts to be his wife. Amram hears the news from her brother, Yonatan, who serves with him in the same unit, and is left shocked and confused.

Yaacov tries to get out of the room – which appears to be some kind of messy warehouse – but is unsuccessful. Someone gives him a cake – which the viewer recognizes as a cake baked a short time before in honor of Yonatan's birthday – placed on top of IDF paper. At first, Yaakov suspects that Amram imprisoned him, but later the bitter truth becomes clear. Eliyahu quarreled with Yonatan and his friend Hillel (Michal Givati ) and they hit him fatally. They saw Yaacov approaching and realized by mistake that Yaacov would not hear about them. Then, when Yonatan opened the window to release Yaacov, the latter, he recognized him and therefore he imprisoned him again. They debated what to do with Yaacov – whether to release him at the risk of whistleblowing or let him die.

In the end, Eliyahu's body is discovered and Mitzhak investigators interrogate the soldiers of the unit, Amram discovers Yonatan's involvement in the case and informs his sister – Elisheva. At the same time, he tries to save Yaakov and forces Yonatan to lead him to the hiding place where Yaakov is being held, but when they get there they discover that Hillel has changed the locks and the shelter cannot be opened.

Amram drags Yonatan to Elisheva's office and there he tells her everything. Elisheva asks Amram to cooperate with Hillel's plan to take Yaacov out at night and dump him near an Arab village. Amram agrees and even convinces Yaacov not to report Yonatan and Hillel.

Amram travels with Joe to visit his dying father and on the way receives a message that his father is dead. They stop at a gas station and Amram decides to tell Joe about the incident. They arrest Yonatan and Hillel, who decided to smuggle Yaacov to an Arab village. Hillel gets a gun, shoots Joe and wounds him but is caught by Amram who calls the police to arrest him and Yonatan. He also releases Yaakov.

After the shiva, Amram and Elisheva meet. Elisheva apologizes for almost confusing Amram and tells him that she is leaving the base. Yaacov returns to his family, who now receive him with love, and then also to command the rookie class and Amram and he become friends again.

== Cast ==
- Roy Nik as Amram, the protagonist with a history of criminal activity and theft
- Dolev Mesika as Yaacov, from the Vizhnitz Hasidic dynasty. He enlists against his family's wishes.
- Avi Mazliah as Gur-Aryeh, a former member of the Hilltop Youth
- Yael Folman as Sargeant Major, Elisheva Glickman and Amram's girlfriend
- Suzanna Papian as Tamar, a female soldier that builds a connection with Yaacov and falls in love with him.
- Ishai Golan as Rabbi Israel Menashe, a settler rabbi who taught Gur-Aryeh and sexually assaulted him
- Yehonatan Vilozny as Elhanan, a settler soldier, whose friend was murdered by terrorists.
- Yuval Shevach as Yonatan, Elisheva's brother
- Michael Givati, a settler soldier that imprisons Yaacov with Yonatan's help

== See also ==
- Shababnikim (2017)
