= Sublet (film) =

- Theatrical release poster
- Directed by: Eytan Fox
- Written by: Eytan Fox; Itay Segal
- Produced by: Moshe Edery; Leon Edry; Micky Rabinovitz; Gal Uchovsky
- Starring: John Benjamin Hickey; Niv Nissim
- Cinematography: Daniel Miller
- Edited by: Nili Feller
- Music by: Tom Darom; Assa Raviv
- Production companies: United King Films; Light Stream Films; Mazeh Productions
- Distributed by: Greenwich Entertainment
- Release dates: November 8, 2020 (PJFF); June 11, 2021 (United States)
- Running time: 91 minutes
- Countries: United States; Israel
- Language: English

Sublet is a 2020 Israeli-American romantic comedy-drama film, directed by Eytan Fox, from a screenplay by Fox and Itay Segal. It stars John Benjamin Hickey and Niv Nissim, and was Nissim's onscreen debut. It had its world premiere at the Philadelphia Jewish Film Festivall on November 8, 2020. It was released in a limited release on June 11, 2021, prior to video on demand on July 9, 2021, by Greenwich Entertainment.

The film follows the character of Michael (John Benjamin Hickey), a gay middle-aged travel writer for the New York Times who travels to Tel Aviv for five days for his column. The film is separated into five chapters, one for each day. Michael sublets an apartment from Tomer (Niv Nissim), a younger film student and gay man looking for some extra money. As Tomer shows Michael around Tel Aviv, the two men's disjointed life experiences, desires and philosophies come into contact with each other.

== Plot ==
On his first day in Tel Aviv, Michael arrives at the apartment he is to sublet only to find it still inhabited by Tomer, who had mixed up the date Michael was to arrive. Learning that Tomer's bike was stolen and he has nowhere else in the city to stay, Michael offers for Tomer to stay in the apartment with him in exchange for showing him around the city. After a short, somewhat strained video call with his husband, David, Michael goes to sleep. On his second day while visiting the Tel Aviv Museum of Art, Michael receives a call from an IVF clinic and learns that David has moved forward with plans to have a child via a surrogate mother without Michael's knowledge.

Over lunch, Michael and Tomer discuss Michael's debut book, Complications, in which he writes about his life in New York City during the AIDS crisis, documenting the death of his then-boyfriend from the disease. Tomer seems to consider AIDS too "depressing" to write or think about, which bewilders Michael. Michael also meets Tomer's friend Daria, who tells Michael she is frustrated with her life as an artist in Israel and plans to move to Berlin with her boyfriend, hoping for an easier time. Michael tells the two that when his generation was frustrated with the state of their lives they protested and tried to effect real change, but Daria says that living only for herself is her form of protest. On the third day Michael and Tomer meet at Frishman Beach, Tomer having found a copy of Michael's book on his way there.

They run into Guy, an informal sexual and romantic partner of Tomer's. Michael asks about him, and Tomer says that Guy wants a more formal relationship but Tomer's philosophy is to "enjoy everything life has to offer" and never to enter any formal relationships. Michael sees a toddler walk and fall into the water and runs to pick him up, but when he does the boy's mother becomes angry with him. That night, David apologizes to Michael for going behind his back but expresses excitement at the surrogacy process moving forward. Michael tells him they should just let the prospect of having a child go before leaving the call to attend a dance performance put on by Daria, a Jewish Israeli and her Palestinian boyfriend. In their performance, the two push each other apart violently before ultimately embracing.

That evening, Tomer browses Atraf for potential casual sex partners. Michael expresses interest in one profile, and Tomer asks if he should invite the man over. Michael considers it and ultimately declines, but Tomer invites him anyway. The man, Kobi, arrives, and after brief conversation Kobi and Tomer begin to have sex as Michael watches. After a few minutes, Michael leaves the room and goes to sleep.

On the morning of the fourth day, Tomer wakes to find Michael boarding a taxi to leave. Tomer stops him and convinces him to stay, inviting Michael to dinner with his mother on the Kibbutz that she lives on. At dinner, Michael learns that Tomer's mother raised him as a single mother, having used a sperm bank to get pregnant. Tomer's mother asks Michael if he ever wanted to have children, telling him that her only regret is not having more children. Michael tells her that he and his husband had recently tried to have a child via IVF, but that the baby died during birth, revealing that the process that David started would actually be their second attempt at having a child. Tomer and his mother urge Michael that it's not too late to try again, and before they leave Michael watches pensively as Tomer and his mother interact.

That night, as Michael is packing to leave, he organizes Tomer's chaotic wardrobe for him. He explains to Tomer the way he has organized it and instructs him in the proper way to fold clothes, and the two sit to match Tomer's socks with each other. When they complete, each is left with one unpaired sock. Using the two unmatched socks as sock puppets, they mime the two dissimilar socks – one a traditional business sock and one a black sock decorated with white stars, deciding to pair up with each other. Still wearing the socks on their hands, the two have sex and fall asleep together.

The next morning the two share a meal in the airport before Michael leaves. As the two observe a mother and son sitting nearby, Tomer tells Michael he thinks Michael would be a good father and that he should try again to have a child. On the flight home, Michael leaves a voice message for David, suggesting they have dinner at a park that they used to go to when they were younger. The film closes as Tomer recovers his stolen bike and rides through the city.

== Cast ==
- John Benjamin Hickey as Michael, the travel writer who visits Tel Aviv
- Niv Nissim as Tomer, the young film student whose apartment Michael sublets
- Lihi Kornowski as Daria, Tomer's close friend
- Peter Spears as David, Michael's husband
- Miki Kam as Malka, Tomer's mother
- Tamir Ginsburg as Kobi
- Gabriel Loukas as Guy

== Pre-production ==
The film's script was co-written by Itay Segal and Eytan Fox, the latter of whom went on to direct the film. Segal is twenty years younger than Fox and a journalist for Yedioth Ahronoth, which contributed to the decision to write Michael as a journalist himself and helped the two writers understand the generational divide in gay culture both in Israel and the world. Fox wrote the character of Michael as a proxy for himself, and conceptualized the film as a dialog between his and a younger generation of gay, Jewish, Israeli men. In an interview with the Jerusalem Post, Fox said that Sublet was a film "about the older man that I am and the younger man that I’m trying to preserve."

From the early days of writing, Fox envisioned John Benjamin Hickey as the ideal actor to play Michael, who was ultimately cast for the role. Hickey later said that he identified with the character as a middle-aged gay New Yorker in a long-term relationship, and that he was exploring and getting to know Tel Aviv during filming just as the character of Michael was. The story of the tragedy in Michael's past was based on the experience of a close friend of Fox's, a gay couple in Israel whose surrogate child died during birth. Initial versions of the script revealed this aspect of Michael's character at the beginning of the film, but the writers ultimately settled on slowly disclosing the tragedy over the course of the film.

== Production ==
The film was set and shot in Florentin, Tel Aviv; Tomer's apartment was a combination of several Florentin apartments as well as a constructed set. Florentin was the titular setting for a previous work by Fox, the 1970s Israeli TV series Florentine. Niv Nissim, who plays Tomer, had previously lived in several apartments in the neighborhood and was familiar with the area.

Sublet features cinematography by Daniel Miller, who had previously won the Israeli Academy Award for Best Cinematography for his work on the 2018 film Fig Tree, and was edited by Nili Feller, who won the same for Best Editing for her work on Waltz with Bashir (2008) and went on to win again for Savoy (2022). The film features original music by Tom Armony, Assa Raviv, and Maya Belitzman.

== Release ==
Sublet was slated to have its world premiere at the Tribeca Film Festival in April 2020, but the festival was delayed due to the COVID-19 pandemic. Instead the film premiered at the Philadelphia Jewish Film Festival on November 8, 2020. Prior to this premiere, Greenwich Entertainment acquired U.S. distribution rights to the film. It also screened at the BFI Flare: London LGBT Film Festival on March 17, 2021. It was released in the United States in a limited release on June 11, 2021, prior to video on demand on July 9, 2021.

== Critical reception ==
Sublet received positive reviews from film critics. It holds a 91% approval rating on review aggregator website Rotten Tomatoes, based on 33 reviews, with an average of 7.1/10. The site's critical consensus reads, "Thoughtful and well-acted, Sublet tenderly depicts a romance that reaches across the generation gap – and into the viewer's heart." On Metacritic, the film holds 67 out a 100 based on 19 reviews, indicating general favorable reviews.

Armond White of National Review praised director's "Platonic and political sophistication", while Jay Weissberg of Variety said that the characters' lack of significant evolution across the plot impeded the narrative and made the film feel "risk-free and standardized". Beatrice Loayza of The New York Times wrote that the film presented a charming and enjoyable double character study but failed to subvert the cliché encounter around which it is based. In The Gay and Lesbian Review, Richard Schneider draw parallels from the slow development of Michael and Tomer's relationship to that of the titular characters in one of Fox's earlier films, Yossi & Jagger (2002).

Harvey Karten of Shock Ya! gave Sublet a B+, while Michael O'Sullivan of The Washington Post and Peter Sobczynski of RogerEbert.com gave the film 2.5 out of 4 stars.
