= The Slut =

- Film poster
- Directed by: Hagar Ben-Asher
- Screenplay by: Hagar Ben-Asher
- Produced by: Benny Drechsel
- Starring: Hagar Ben-Asher; Ishai Golan; Icho Avital; Yoav Levi; Tsahi Hanan
- Cinematography: Amit Yasur
- Edited by: Asaf Korman
- Production company: Transfax Film
- Distributed by: Zootrope Films
- Release date: May 2011 (Cannes)
- Running time: 87 minutes
- Country: Israel
- Language: Hebrew

The Slut (Hebrew: הנותנת, translit. Ha-Notenet) is a 2011 Israeli drama film directed by Hagar Ben-Asher. It stars Hagar Ben-Asher as the titular character, Ishai Golan, Icho Avital, Yoav Levi and Tsahi Hanan. The film premiered in May 2011 at the Cannes Film Festival and featured in the Critics' Week.

== Plot ==
Tamar, a promiscuous thirty-something, lives on a farm with her two daughters and occupies her spare time with a string of lovers. A new arrival in the village, changes everything. Shai, a veterinary surgeon is in town to settle his late mother's estate. He treats one of Tamar's injured livestock, soon falls under her spell and they become romantically involved. This brings up questions such as - can she emotionally commit and does she have what it takes to survive a monogamous relationship?

== Cast ==
- Hagar Ben-Asher as Tamar
- Ishai Golan as Shai
- Icho Avital
- Yoav Levi
- Tsahi Hanan

== Production ==
The sex scene between Hagar Ben-Asher and Ishay Golan is highly debated. Many think that the penetration is not simulated, but the actor said it was only an illusion. "Did we have sex on camera? No. Our acting technique was really refined by the time we shot that scene, after so much rehearsal and repetition. We shot that scene on our final day, when our technique was at its absolute best. It was the culmination of a long process of working together, and I felt really safe," he said.

== Release ==
The film premiered in May 2011 at the Cannes Film Festival and featured in the Critics' Week. It won an award for Best Director at the 2011 Jerusalem Film Festival and was entered into the director's category at the Chicago International Film Festival later that year.

== Reception ==
In Haaretz, Oron Shamir wrote that "The film consists of scenic long shots blended with a number of sex scenes so daring that they seriously push the boundaries of modern Israeli cinema."

Todd McCarthy of The Hollywood Reporter described the film as "a slow-going, rather pointless Israeli drama about an attractive rural woman who just gotta have it. Notoriety of its title and content will attract some attention on the festival circuit and no doubt in Israel, but audiences will have that empty feeling afterwards."

Alissa Simon writing for Variety said that "The Slut refrains from supplying audiences with an emotional hook; lissome cipher Tamar is all id. We have no idea what she thinks or why she behaves the way she does, except, perhaps, at the pic’s not unexpected but still not well-prepared conclusion."

The film also won at the Torino Film Festival 2009 for Best Screenplay.
