= Street Food Around the World =

- Genre: Reality television Adventure; Culinary
- Starring: Ishai Golan
- Country of origin: Israel
- Original language: English
- No. of seasons: 2
- No. of episodes: 25

Production
- Running time: 25 minutes

Original release
- Network: Fox Life, National Geographic Channel
- Release: 2012

Street Food Around The World is a reality television series first aired on French travel channel Voyage in 2012. Now it is broadcasting on Fox Life and National Geographic Channel. The show follows host Ishai Golan, exploring street food of a city around the world in each episode.

== List of episodes ==
=== Season 1 ===
Season 1 was rated 100% by Rotten Tomatoes.

- S01E01 – Istanbul, Turkey
- S01E02 – Mumbai, India
- S01E03 – Haifa, Israel
- S01E04 – Paris, France
- S01E05 – Bangkok, Thailand
- S01E06 – Hanoi, Vietnam
- S01E07 – Marrakesh, Morocco
- S01E08 – Amsterdam, Netherlands
- S01E09 – Naples, Italy
- S01E10 – Tbilisi, Georgia
- S01E11 – Vienna, Austria
- S01E12 – Mexico City, Mexico
- S01E13 – Best of Season 1

=== Season 2 ===
- S02E01 – Rio de Janeiro, Brazil
- S02E02 – Athens, Greece
- S02E03 – New York City, United States (part 1)
- S02E04 – New York City, United States (part 2)
- S02E05 – Lima, Peru
- S02E06 – Ramla, Israel
- S02E07 – Prague, Czech Republic
- S02E08 – Palermo, Italy
- S02E09 – Seoul, South Korea
- S02E10 – Manila, Philippines
- S02E11 – Marseille, France
- S02E12 – Nazareth, Israel
- S02E13 – Best of Season 2

== Guest appearance ==
Season 1:

- Chef Vedat Başaran
- Chef Vicky Ratnani
- Chef Yisrael Aharoni
- Food Critic Gilles Pudlowski
- Chef McDang
- Chef Bien Duc Nguyen
- Culinary Guide Habiba Errajai
- Food Writer Johannes van Dam
- Chef Don Alfonso
- Culinary Guide Ruth T. Alegria
- Chef Mónica Patiño

Season 2:

- Chef Flavia Quaresma
- Chef Vangelis Driskas
- Chef Rocco DiSpirito
- Chef Gastón Acurio
- Former Mayor Yoel Lavi
- Chef Bonetta Dell'oglio
- Chef Edward Young-min Kwon
- Chef Rolando Laudico
- Chef Ludovic Turac
- Chef Elias Mattar

== Awards ==
- Best International Program, 2013 Tasty Awards.
