= Hani Furstenberg =

Israeli-American actress and singer

- חני פירסטנברג
- Born: September 14; Israel
- Occupations: Actress; Singer
- Notable work: Yossi & Jagger; Campfire; The Loneliest Planet
- Spouse: Ido Heskia
- Children: 1

Hani Furstenberg (Hebrew: חני פירסטנברג; born September 14) is an Israeli-American actress and singer, perhaps best known in Israel for her work in the films Yossi & Jagger and Campfire, and internationally for her role in The Loneliest Planet.

== Early life ==
Furstenberg was born in Israel to a family of Ashkenazi Jewish descent. She moved to New York City, when she was six weeks old and lived there until her family returned to Israel when she was 16.

== Career ==
In Israel, Furstenberg first gained notoriety for her role as Lilach in the TV drama The Bourgeoisie (HaBurganim) and has since starred in numerous Israeli plays and television series, including the second season of False Flag and in the second season of American Gods as the loa, Maman Brigitte, the wife of Baron Samedi from Haitian Vodou.

She made her Broadway debut in December 2014 playing Fraulein Kost in Cabaret.

Furstenberg has become known internationally for her performance in the award-winning film, The Loneliest Planet. In 2019, she starred in Epic Pictures', The Golem.

== Personal life ==
Since 2010, she has resided in the United States with her Israeli husband Ido Heskia, and their daughter.
