= False Flag (TV series) =

Israeli television thriller drama series

- Hebrew: כפולים
- Genre: Drama, Thriller
- Created by: Maria Feldman; Amit Cohen
- Based on: Mahmoud al-Mabhouh case
- Written by: Amit Cohen
- Directed by: Oded Ruskin
- Starring: Ishai Golan; Maggie Azarzar; Ania Bukstein; Angel Bonanni; Orna Salinger; Mickey Leon; Morris Cohen; Sergey Bukhman; Yigal Naor
- Composer: Gilad Benamram
- Country of origin: Israel
- Original language: Hebrew
- No. of seasons: 3
- No. of episodes: 18

Production
- Producers: Maria Feldman; Liat Bnasoli
- Cinematography: Nadav Hakselman
- Editor: Or Ben David
- Camera setup: Single-camera
- Running time: 45 minutes
- Production company: Keshet Media

Original release
- Network: Channel 2 Channel 12
- Release: October 29, 2015 – present

False Flag (Hebrew: כפולים, romanized: Kfulim, lit. 'Doubles') is an Israeli television thriller drama series. Directed by Oded Ruskin and starring Ishai Golan, the plot involves five ordinary Israelis who wake up one morning and discover that their names, faces, and personal details have been splashed across the world’s media on suspicion of involvement in a high-profile kidnapping.

The series was first broadcast in Israel on Channel 2. It premiered on 29 October 2015 and was followed by a second season that premiered on 21 November 2018. The third season was broadcast on Channel 12 on 23 March 2022.

A British remake of the series starring Uma Thurman, called Suspicion, aired on Apple TV+ in February 2022.

== Synopsis ==
=== Season 1 (2015) ===
The story revolves around five ordinary Israeli citizens who discover one morning via the media that they are the principal suspects of a high-profile kidnapping and are implicated as culprits in the kidnapping. They are involved in a brutal kidnapping of the Iranian minister of defense, Farhead Sulimani, during his visit to Moscow on 15 April 2015, having arrived in the country earlier that day from London under an alias and using one of several passports. According to the Russian Federal Security Service (FSB), Sulimani was drugged. Widespread speculation, which Russian police allegations support, is that he was killed by the Israeli Mossad in a secret mission.

News channels around the world cover the incident while broadcasting the footage of the kidnapping, the five Israelis soon become wanted and their personal details, including their passports photos, are shown on the media and TV channels around the world.

The unceasing news coverage causes an uproar in the suspects' lives and mixed feelings from their surroundings and the public. Their attempts to deny their involvement are in vain. The Mossad and the Israeli government leave them to deal with it on their own instead of providing protection. It's not long before they undermine their credibility. Later, even their closest friends begin to distrust them. Although eventually it is discovered that they are not that innocent.

=== Season 2 (2018) ===
The focus shifts to a new incident and a fresh set of suspects. The opening scene features a grand inauguration of a new oil pipeline linking Israel to Turkey, during which a powerful explosion rocks the ceremony and kills several people, including government officials.

The blast becomes instantly labelled as terrorism, thrusting ordinary citizens into an international crisis.

Eitan Kopel (Leon) is summoned to lead the investigation, working alongside his former Shin Bet colleague Eli (Cohen).

They probe the explosion’s causes, looking into possible involvement by Hezbollah, tensions over territorial waters, and security vulnerabilities at the oil rig.

The narrative then zeroes in on three new suspects whose lives unravel as the fallout deepens. These individuals are seemingly model citizens— a startup professional, a rig worker with marine engineering training, and a tour guide—yet their disappearance in the explosion thrusts their families into chaos.

As investigators dig deeper, secrets shake the trust within these family units, revealing hidden loyalties, lies, and connections that expose more than just innocence or guilt.

Meanwhile, a returning character from Season 1, Sean Tilson (Bonanni), reappears with unresolved debts and murky ties to the unfolding events, adding layers of suspense and personal stakes.

As the season progresses, the investigation leads to confrontations, betrayals, and unexpected alliances. In the final episodes, Eitan and Eli close in on the true mastermind behind the explosion, and the characters must confront whether they were pawns in a larger conspiracy or active agents in the crime.

=== Season 3 (2022) ===
The story centers around a chemical attack at a hotel during a corporate party for an Israeli high‑tech company, prompting an urgent international and political fallout. Eitan Kopel, a Mossad investigator from previous seasons, is sent to Cyprus to lead the inquiry.

The investigation is complicated by the use of sophisticated data analysis which identifies three employees of the tech firm as primary suspects. Each of them has secrets, possible motives, and potential connections to the event, but evidence is murky and the trail is tangled.

As Kopel delves deeper, questions arise: Was this a planned terrorist attack? A targeted individual’s assassination? Or a catastrophic misunderstanding gone wrong? The boundaries between guilt and innocence blur, and Eitan must navigate not only technical data and intelligence sources but also corporate cover‑ups, personal betrayals, and public perception.

Throughout the season, Season 3 also emphasizes the impact of modern digital technologies—big data, social media, and how information (or misinformation) shapes the narrative. The morally gray character arcs are magnified: even those considered “ordinary employees” are shown to have hidden dimensions, and trust becomes a scarce commodity.

By the end, the resolution is less about clear answers and more about understanding how easily truth is distorted, especially in a world driven by rapid bits of information, agendas, and competing narratives. Eitan’s investigation closes many threads but leaves room for reflection: are we ever really sure who is telling the truth?

== Cast and characters ==
=== Main cast ===
- Ishai Golan as Ben "Benny" Rephael – A chemist and a family man, an Israeli with a Greek citizenship. (S1)
- Magi Azarzar as Natalie Alfassia – A bride on her wedding day, an Israeli with a French citizenship. (S1)
- Ania Bukstein as Asia Brindich – A kindergarten teacher, an Israeli with a Russian citizenship. (S1)
- Angel Bonanni as Sean Tilson – An Israeli with dual Dutch citizenship, came back to Israel after a vacation in India. (S1-2)
- Orna Salinger as Emma Lipman – New Israeli citizen with dual British citizenship. (S1)
- Mickey Leon as Eithan Kopel – Head of the Shin Bet investigation team and a former Mossad agent. (S1-3)
- Yiftach Klein as Sagi Kedmi (S2)
- Neta Riskin as Anat Kedmi (S2)
- Yousef Sweid as Amir Cohen (S2)
- Hanna Azoulay Hasfari as Miriam Levi (S2)
- Hani Furstenberg as Joan 'Jo' Berger (S2)
- Moran Rosenblatt as Dikla Levi (S2)
- Lihi Kornowski as Mika Arazy (S2)
- Romi Aboulafia as Daphna Mishor (S3)
- Ohad Knoller as Shimi Dekel (S3)
- Tali Sharon as Neri Inbal (S3)
- Yossi Marshek as Yaya Mishor (S3)
- Lena Fraifeld as Anna Youdovski (S3)
- Shani Aviv as Corinne Abadi (S3)

=== Recurring cast ===
- Morris Cohen as Eli Mazor – Shin Bet investigator
- Sergey Bukhman as Alex Feldman – Shin Bet investigator
- Avigail Ariely as Efrat – Ben's wife
- Shmil Ben Ari as Gafni
- Roi Assaf as Yuval – Natalie's fiance
- Yigal Naor as Gabi

== Production ==
The series is directed by Oded Ruskin and stars Ishai Golan, Maggie Azarzar, Angel Bonanni, Ania Bukstein, Yigal Naor, and Orna Salinger. It was created for Keshet International by Maria Feldman and Amit Cohen.

The storyline is loosely based on the story of the assassination in Dubai of Mahmoud al-Mabhouh, co-founder of the military wing of Islamist Palestinian group Hamas, on January 19, 2010.

== Release ==
The series had its world premiere at the Berlin International Film Festival in February. In October 2015, during the annual trade show MIPCOM, it was announced that the series was acquired by Fox International and was its first acquisition of a foreign-language series on a global scale.

It was first broadcast on Israel's Channel 2 on October 29, 2015, and was followed by a second season released on November 21, 2018.

It aired on Fox UK in August 2017, and on Hulu in the United States in January 2018. Seasons 1-2 aired on SBS on Demand in Australia from 2020.

The third season premiered in Israel on 23 March 2022 on Channel 12, before being released internationally by Fox.

== Reception ==
The series was well-reviewed by The Guardian in the UK and by The New York Times US.

The first season won both the Audience Award and the Grand Prize at France’s Series Mania.

== Remake ==
A remake of the series starring Uma Thurman, titled Suspicion, for Apple TV+, aired in February 2022.

== Episodes ==
Title	Summary	Directed	Written	Original air date	Israel viewers
Episode 1.1	Russian intelligence uncovers footage of five Israelis kidnapping the Iranian defence minister	Oded Ruskin	Amit Cohen, Maria Feldman, Leora Kamenetzky	October 29, 2015	30.0%
Episode 1.2	Eitan interrogates four of the suspects whilst Sean avoids capture	Oded Ruskin	Amit Cohen, Maria Feldman	October 29, 2015	28.9%
Episode 1.3	A new video of the Iranian defence minister surfaces claiming to have defected and not been kidnapped	Oded Ruskin	Amit Cohen, Maria Feldman	November 4, 2015	26.3%
Episode 1.4	Natalie admits to having laundered money for anonymous people but didn't know it was for Sean	Oded Ruskin	Amit Cohen, Maria Feldman	November 4, 2015	24.4%
Episode 1.5	Sean suspects Gabi Silvers' motives. He abandons the safe house to collect a memory stick left at Asia's apartment	Oded Ruskin	Amit Cohen, Maria Feldman	November 11, 2015	N/A
Episode 1.6	Benny and Emma get help from Yuval in their escape. They warn Asia and escape to an isolated cabin	Oded Ruskin	Amit Cohen, Maria Feldman	November 18, 2015	N/A
Episode 1.7	Inside the cabin, Asia argues with everyone and goes to an isolated spot with Sean	Oded Ruskin	Amit Cohen, Maria Feldman	November 25, 2015	N/A
Episode 1.8	After a shootout between Sean and Emma, Benny manages to convince Sean to escape. Benny, Emma, Asia and Natalie are arrested and extradited to Russia	Oded Ruskin	Amit Cohen Maria; Maria Feldman	December 2, 2015	29.4%
Episode 2.1	A large explosion rocks the inauguration ceremony for a new oil pipeline between Israel and Turkey. Eitan Kopel, the Mossad investigator, is summoned to join the Shin Bet and Eli to investigate the incident.	Oded Ruskin	Maria Feldman, Leora Kamenetzky	November 21, 2018	N/A
Episode 2.2	Investigators are sent to the suspects' homes, three people who were on the guest list, but not among the dead or survivors. Eitan questions Mika – girlfriend of the suspect Amir Cohen who believes that she is living with a hi-tech entrepreneur - and has his suspicions raised by the fact that she participated in an illegal demonstration. Meanwhile, the Ops Room discovers that Amir's father is Hamis il Hamati – an Israeli Arab who used to live in the occupied territories. Eitan confronts Mika with the fact that her boyfriend is an Arab suspected of planning and executing a terrorist act. Mika finds this impossible to believe.	Oded Ruskin	Maria Feldman, Leora Kamenetzky	November 21, 2018	N/A
Episode 2.3	Dikla is released under house arrestbut is horrified to find that she is being taken to her parents' home. Her protests of having no contact with her Orthodox parents are in vain, and she is sent to her parents' home in the Haredi Orthodox neighborhood of Ramat Eliyahu. There she is forced to face her estranged Haredi father in the tiny apartment she escaped as a teenager.	Oded Ruskin	Maria Feldman, Leora Kamenetzky	November 28, 2018	N/A
Episode 2.4	Mosh and Dovdov, incompetent drug dealers, bring Miriam to their apartment and lock her in a room. Later an armed and motorcycle-helmeted hitman breaks in and kills Mosh and Dovdov. Certain that she's going also be killed, Miriam is surprised when the assassin, whose face is concealed by a motorcycle helmet, leaves the apartment without harming her.	Oded Ruskin	Maria Feldman, Leora Kamenetzky	December 5, 2018	N/A
Episode 2.5	At the safe house it is revealed that Amir and Anat were both operated by Sayag from the Mossad. Also, the USB drive that Anat brought from Moscow contains encrypted documents, including a secret contract between Russia and Israel. As the computer decodes the encryption, Anat and Amir hack into the Shin Bet computers and discover for the first time that there is a third suspect called Dikla Levi. They decide to head for Ramat Eliyahu to interrogate her, both posing as Haredi Orthodox Jews.	Oded Ruskin	Maria Feldman, Leora Kamenetzky	December 12, 2018	N/A
Episode 2.6	Dressed as a Haredi Orthodox woman, Anat goes to the hospital to visit the wounded Uri. To get closer to him, she meets and assaults a medical clown and dresses in his costume. Anat goes into the hospital wing as Uri is being wheeled back to his room from surgery; she can't even touch him. Eitan ambushes Sagi in the hospital corridor, forcing him to cooperate with the Ops Room – at the end of their confrontation, it is agreed that Sagi will turn over Anat by speed dial once he sees her.	Oded Ruskin	Maria Feldman, Leora Kamenetzky	December 12, 2018	N/A
Episode 2.7	The Minister reads the Russian contract and states that it is fake. When she leaves, Eitan shares his theory with Gafni that Anat and Amir were working for Sayag without official approval. Dikla reads in the newspaper that Dovdov and Mosh were murdered. To her surprise, the police release her. Eitan goes back to the Ops Room, where he discovers that his access card no longer works and the Mossad is being shut out of the investigation.	Oded Ruskin	Maria Feldman, Leora Kamenetzky	December 19, 2018	N/A
Episode 2.8	Anat is interrogated by the Shin Bet. She is deprived of sleep, as they try to get her to admit she is responsible for the explosion. Sean is at home with his girlfriend, who is pregnant. He tells her that he's finally going to get the money he is owed and they will be able to leave for Australia the next evening. Jo presses Dikla to leave for Cyprus and get married right away. Dikla does not understand the sudden urgency, but reluctantly agrees.	Oded Ruskin	Maria Feldman, Leora Kamenetzky	December 26, 2018	N/A
Episode 2.9	Eitan interrogates Jo brutally and eventually Jo breaks down and gives him a partial truth: she and Sean were in it together, but Sean was the one operating her, forcing her to bring all sorts of packages to him at the oil rig – she knew nothing about what was in them or who was operating Sean. This information is enough for Eitan to hand Jo over to the Shin Bet, hoping that now they will release Anat and Amir.	Oded Ruskin	Maria Feldman, Leora Kamenetzky	January 2, 2019	N/A
Episode 2.10	Anat, Amir, and Eitan join forces in an attempt to catch Sean, who has been coerced into killing them. Earlier Eitan found a note for Leni's sonogram appointment, so Anat attempts to contact Leni to try catch Sean to question him about the identity of his and Jo's operators – the people in the black van.	Oded Ruskin	Maria Feldman, Leora Kamenetzky	January 9, 2019	N/A

== See also ==
- Mahmoud al-Mabhouh
