= The Loneliest Planet =

2011 film

- Theatrical release poster
- Directed by: Julia Loktev
- Screenplay by: Julia Loktev
- Based on: Expensive Trips Nowhere by Tom Bissell
- Produced by: Helge Albers; Marie-Therese Guirgis; Lars Knudsen; Jay Van Hoy
- Starring: Gael García Bernal; Hani Furstenberg
- Cinematography: Inti Briones
- Edited by: Julia Loktev; Michael Taylor
- Music by: Richard Skelton
- Distributed by: IFC Films (United States); Palace Films (Australia)
- Release dates: August 11, 2011 (Locarno); October 26, 2012 (United States)
- Running time: 113 minutes
- Countries: United States; Georgia; Germany
- Languages: English; Georgian; Spanish

The Loneliest Planet is a 2011 American drama thriller film written and directed by Julia Loktev, based on the short story Expensive Trips Nowhere by Tom Bissell, published in his collection God Lives in St. Petersburg. Starring Gael García Bernal and Hani Furstenberg, the film follows a young couple who travel with a local guide through a twisted backpacking trip across the Georgian wilderness.

The Loneliest Planet premiered at the Locarno Film Festival on August 11, 2011, followed by its North American premiere at the Toronto International Film Festival on September 12, 2011. The film was theatrically released in the United States on October 26, 2012, to positive reviews from critics.

It went on to be screened at the New York Film Festival, the BFI London Film Festival, and the 2011 AFI Fest in Los Angeles, where it won the Grand Jury Prize.

== Plot ==
Alex (Gael García Bernal) and Nica (Hani Furstenberg) are in love and engaged to be married. They are seasoned travelers on a trip in the country of Georgia, formerly a republic of the Soviet Union. They hire a local guide (Bidzina Gujabidze) to take them backpacking through the breathtaking scenery of the Caucasus Mountains.

While on their journey, they meet an older man with two boys on their route; he is suspicious of the two foreigners. After a short conversation with their guide, the older man suddenly aims a hunting rifle aggressively at Alex and Nica at point-blank range. For a moment, Alex's reaction is to shield himself behind Nica. He immediately regains his composure and pushes himself in front of Nica to face the stranger's gun, while their guide in turn persuades the stranger to lower his gun and go on his way. A seemingly traumatized Nica walks away on her own.

A few scenes show the couple not speaking or walking together while on their journey to the mountains, although Alex repeatedly attempts to reconnect with Nica. At one point, they cross a stream where Nica accidentally falls only to be saved by the local guide. Alex tries to offer a shivering Nica some help, but she rebuffs him. At night, the local guide tells Nica the story of his failed marriage, and they kiss. Soon after, Nica returns to Alex and the couple has sex. At dawn, the trio start packing up their camps, and it remains ambiguous as to whether or not the couple has finally reconciled.

== Cast ==
- Gael García Bernal as Alex
- Hani Furstenberg as Nica
- Bidzina Gujabidze as Dato, their local guide
- Amiran Gudrshauri as kebab seller

== Release ==
On October 11, 2011, it was announced that Sundance Selects, a division of IFC Films, had acquired North American distribution rights.

== Reception ==
The film was well-received by critics. The film holds an approval rating of 70% on review aggregator Rotten Tomatoes, based on 62 reviews with an average of 6.9/10. The website's critical consensus reads, "The source material that inspired The Loneliest Planet may be brief, but this adaptation of a Tom Bissell short story compensates with studious, finely detailed filmmaking, haunting visuals, and thought-provoking subtext." On Metacritic, the film has a weighted average score of 76 out of 100, based on 19 critics, indicating "generally favorable reviews".

A.O. Scott of The New York Times called The Loneliest Planet, "gripping and haunting, but also coy and elusive". Roger Ebert of the Chicago Sun-Times gave it two out of four and wrote: "All of this grows tiresome. We're given no particular reason at the outset of The Loneliest Planet to care about these people, our interest doesn't grow along the way, the landscape grows repetitive...."

== Accolades ==
The Loneliest Planet was awarded the Golden Lady at the Las Palmas de Gran Canaria International Film Festival, where Furstenberg also won for Best Actress. It won the Golden Tulip International Competition at the International Istanbul Film Festival.
