= Ishai Golan =

Israeli actor

- ישי גולן
- Golan in 2023
- Born: November 22, 1973 (age 52); Ramat Gan, Israel
- Occupation: Actor
- Years active: 1990–present
- Spouse: Ruti
- Children: 3

Ishai Golan (Hebrew: ישי גולן; born 22 November 1973) is an Israeli film, television and stage actor. He had early film roles in Where Eagles Fly (1990) and Amazing Grace. He later starred as Uri Geller in the Ken Russell-directed film, Mindbender (1996). This was followed by a breakthrough role as Tomer in the cult Israeli series, Tironoot (1998).

In 2010, he won the Israeli Television Academy award for Best Actor for playing Uri Zach, an Israeli soldier held captive for 17 years in the critically acclaimed drama series, Prisoners of War (Hatufim) on Channel 2. He returned for the second and final season in 2012.

He also starred in the second season of the psychological thriller series, The Gordin Cell (2014-15) on Yes. He then returned to Channel 2 for the thriller series, False Flag (2015).

He has since appeared in the horror film, The Golem (2018) and the American war drama, White Bird (2024).

== Early life ==
He was born in Ramat Gan in Israel before moving with his family to Toronto in Canada when he was a one-year-old, where his parents opened Topaz jewellery stores. He returned with his family to live in Israel when he was six-years-old.

At the age of 15, he enrolled at Thelma Yellin High School of Arts in Givatayim to study theatre. His parents divorced when he was 14 years-old. Shortly afterwards, his mother became a chozer b'teshuvah (returnee to religious observance) and observes a Haredi lifestyle with Golan's stepfather.

He completed his military service with the Israeli military ensembles. He then studied at London Academy of Music and Dramatic Art in London. Regarding his time in the academy, Golan said that even though he knew English, it took him a couple of months to get used to learning plays by William Shakespeare but after that time period he started to dream in Shakespeare's language.

His grandfather fled the Holocaust by coming to Mandatory Palestine from Leipzig during the Second World War. His paternal grandparents were pioneers in pre-State Israel, with his grandfather going to work at the Dead Sea Works. His mother is from the well-to-do Scheindemann family of Tel Aviv, who operated a fashion boutique.

== Career ==
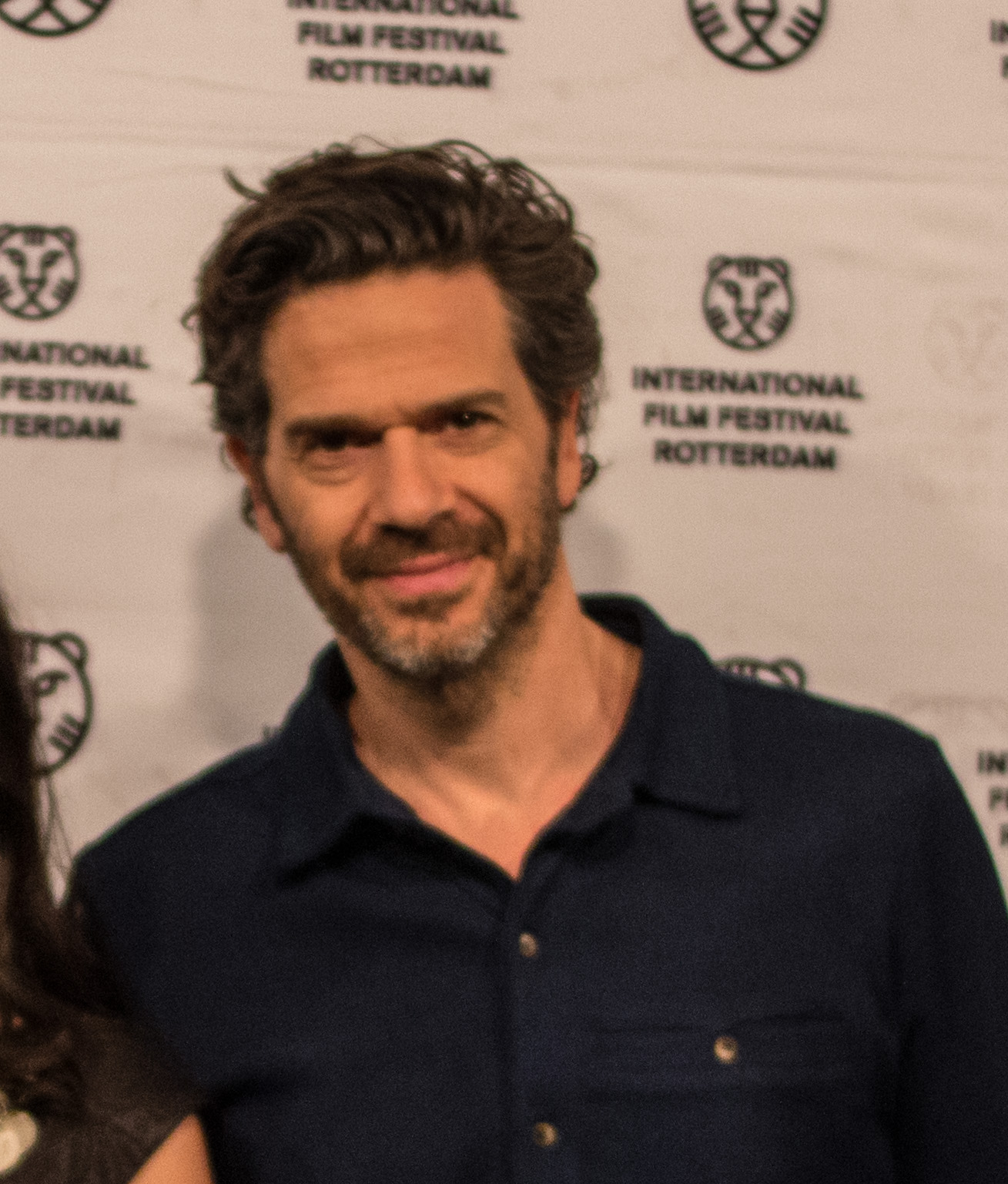
Golan at the 47th International Film Festival Rotterdam, 2018

In 1990, he got his first cinematic role at the age of 17 in the film 'דרך הנשר' (The Eagle's Path) that was directed by Uri Barbash and starring Gidi Gov, Eli Danker and Nurit Galron. He stated that 'This film has shaped my awareness about being an actor. From the moment that I participated in this movie, I understood that this is me and this is my place'. He also appeared in Amos Guttman's Amazing Grace (1992) and in 'מנת יתר' (Overdose).

In 1996, Golan starred in the Ken Russell-directed TV film Mindbender, a Uri Geller biopic. Later on he appeared in the films Operation YY (2000), Six Million Fragments (2000), Rashevsky's Tango (2003) and Love Life (2007). Golan also appeared in minor roles in a number of American films shot in Israel. In 2011, in the film 'עד סוף הקיץ' (By Summer's End), he played a father who returns to his family for a visit after abandoning them. A year later he co-starred in the provocative film 'הנותנת' (The Slut). In Haaretz, Oron Shamir wrote that "The film consists of scenic long shots blended with a number of sex scenes so daring that they seriously push the boundaries of modern Israeli cinema."

His first appearance in a television series was in Fool's gold (1994), later he appeared on Siton (1995), and in 1999's 'טירונות' (Recruit Training), he portrayed Tomer, a new Israeli soldier who falls in love with Officer Jenia. The role on that show is what convinced Golan to return to Israel after Uri Barbash called to Golan who was still in London during that time and offered him to come back to Israel to play on the show. Golan stated that he remembers that after the phone call ended, he was so happy and full of joy that Barbash was saving him from the desperation that he was experiencing during that time as an actor in his first phases on his career in the acting industry of London.

During the 2000s, Golan appeared in television series’ Love Around The Corner (2003), The Island (2007) and I didn't promise (2007). In 2010, he co-starred in the critically acclaimed series Prisoners of War and portrayed Uri, a prisoner of war who returns home 17 years after he was captured by enemy. For this performance, he won the Israeli Academy of Film and Television award for best actor in a drama series. In 2012, he appeared on the comedy series 'תנוחי' (Get Some Rest) alongside Yael Grobglas who worked with him on The Island.

Golan also appeared in many theatre plays such as "Lovers and Pleasant", "The Withdrawal From Moscow", "Railway to Damascus" and "One Flew Over the Cuckoo's Nest" in Habima Theatre, "Children of a Lesser God" in Beersheba Theater, as well as "Transparent Roof", "Bianka" and "Then in Prague" at the Beit Lessin Theater, and "All My Sons" in Haifa Theatre.

In 2012 he started hosting the Fox Life show Street Food Around The World. In each episode, Golan presents the street food of a specific city as he visits food stands, restaurants and local chefs. In 2014, he co-starred in False Flag and portrayed Ben Rephael, an Israeli chemist and a family man who is implicated together with 4 other Israeli citizens in a high-profile kidnapping that is covered by the media all over the world. In 2017, Golan portrayed Carter Woods in the teen drama series "Greenhouse Academy."

In 2018, he starred in the critically acclaimed Israeli period supernatural horror film, The Golem. In 2020, he co-created an starred in The Crown Experiments, a psychological drama series. He starred alongside his False Flag co-stars, Ania Bukstein and Angel Bonanni. The international broadcast rights were sold to Roku in the United States in 2022.

In 2023, he appeared alongside Helen Mirren in the Holocaust drama film, White Bird.

== Filmography ==
Year	Title	Role	Notes
1990	Where Eagles Fly (Derech Ha'nesher)		Film
1992	Amazing Grace (Hessed Mufla)	Doron	Film
1993	Overdose (Manat Yeter)		Film
1995	Sitton	Tom	1 episode
1996	Mindbender	Uri Geller	TV film
1998	Tironoot	Tomer	6 episodes
1999	Delta Force One: The Lost Patrol	Camel Ambush IPF Officer	Film
2000	Operation YY (Mitzvah YY)		Short film
2000	The Last Patrol	Richard Jasper	Film
2001	Aball'e	Alon	TV film
2001	Six Million Pieces (Shisha Million Rasisim)		Series regular
2003	Rashevski's Tango	Youval	Film
2003-2005	Love Around the Corner (Ahava Me'ever Lapina)	Daniel	Series regular
2007	Love Life (Liebesleben)	Yoni	film
2007-2008	The Island (Ha-E)	Max	Series regular
2008	Salt of this Sea	Male Agent	Film
2008	Gefilte Fish	Yaron	Short film
2009	Bed Stories		Short film
2009-2012	Prisoners of War (Hatufim)	Uri Zach	Series regular
2011	The Slut	Shay	Film
2011	By Summer's End (Ad Sof Ha-kaitz)	Rafi	Film
2012	Chill (Tanoochi)	Mati	2 episodes
2012	Pastrami	Father	Short film
2013	Streets of Rage	The Narrator	Short film
2014-2015	The Gordin Cell	Aharal'e Nir	10 episodes
2015	False Flag (Kfulim)	Ben Refael	Series regular
2016	Der Tel-Aviv-Krimi	Ariel Gutman	1 episode
2016	Antenna		Film
2016	The Road to Where	Avi	Film
2017	Soup		Short film
2017	Zaam	Schwartz	TV miniseries
2017	Family	Avi	Film
2017	Outdoors (Bayit Bagali)	Daniel	Series regular
2017	Kipat Barzel (Commandments)	Rabbi Israel Menashe	6 episodes
2017-2018	Vicki & Me (Viki VeAni)	Eitan	Series regular
2017-2020	Greenhouse Academy	Carter Woods	Series regular
2018	The Reports on Sarah and Saleem	David	Film
2018	Not What You Think (Lo Hakol Varod)	Amos	TV series
2018	The Golem	Benjamin	Film
2018	Masks On	Dad	Short film
2018	With Shut Eyes		Short film
2020	The Dinner (Haarucha)	Daniel	Series regular
2020-2022	Manayek	Eitan Doitsh	Series regular
2021	Plan A	Abba Kovener	Film
2021	Bug		Short film
2023	DreaMars	Uzi Gold	6 episodes
2024	White Bird	Max	Film
2024	Testament: The Story of Moses	Aaron	Main cast, miniseries
2024	8200		Series regular
2025	Bell Pepper Season	Boaz	Short film
2025	Book of Ruth		Film
2026	The Escape	Mordechai	Series regular

== Personal life ==
Golan resides in Tel Aviv with his wife Ruti, a child psychologist, and three children. In the 2013 elections he strongly supported Da'am Workers Party. In 2013, he was a candidate in Tel Aviv-Yafo Municipality local elections. He ran with the party list of the party, City Without Borders. As part of his platform he pushed for Tel Aviv to do more to support artists.

He identifies as an atheist. His brother lives in Vancouver and his sister has spent the last 30 years in Ramallah in the West Bank, having married a Palestinian.

In 2026, he praised the unity in Israeli society following the October 7 attacks in 2023: "What happened after October 7, this unity, which Hamas did not expect, saved us. Israel is a very special place, our society is very special and fascinating, and I am happy to be a part of it."

In 2026, he stated that he is critical of attempts to boycott Israeli creative industries, and acknowledged that anti-semitism is also playing a role.

In the same year, he declined to publicly endorse a political party and share his political positions ahead of the 2026 Israeli legislative election.
