= Siam Rath Weekly Review =

Defunct newspaper in Bangkok, Thailand

- 10 December 1964 issue of the Siam Rath Weekly Review
- Type: Weekly newspaper
- Editor: Kukrit Pramoj
- Founded: 10 July 1952
- Language: English
- Ceased publication: 1964?
- Headquarters: Bangkok, Thailand

The Siam Rath Weekly Review was an English-language weekly newspaper whose first issue was published in Thailand on 10 July 1952. The contents of Siam Rath Weekly Review were mainly the translations of feature materials and editorials from the Thai-language newspapers, especially the daily Siam Rath, also owned by M.R. Kukrit.

== See also ==
- Timeline of English-language newspapers published in Thailand
- List of online newspaper archives - Thailand
