= Campfire (film) =

2004 Israeli film

- Film poster
- Hebrew: מדורת השבט
- Directed by: Joseph Cedar
- Written by: Joseph Cedar
- Produced by: David Mandil; Eyal Shiray
- Starring: Michaela Eshet; Hani Furstenberg; Moshe Ivgy; Maya Maron
- Cinematography: Ofer Inov
- Edited by: Einat Glaser-Zarhin
- Music by: Ofer Shalhin
- Distributed by: Film Movement
- Release dates: February 2004 (Berlin); 9 September 2005
- Running time: 96 minutes
- Country: Israel
- Languages: Hebrew; English
- Box office: $34,835 (U.S. domestic)

Campfire (Hebrew: מדורת השבט, romanized: Medurat Ha-Shevet, lit. 'Tribal Campfire') is a 2004 Israeli film written and directed by Joseph Cedar. Set in 1981, the film focuses on a woman seeking to join an Israeli settlement on the West Bank, despite the protests of her teenage daughters.

The film premiered at the 54th Berlin International Film Festival in February 2004. The film won five Israeli Academy Awards and was Israel's official submission for the 77th Academy Awards in the Best Foreign Language Film category (but did not get a nomination). The film was well received in Israel, the United States, and in international film festivals.

== Synopsis ==
The story of a young widow, mother of two beautiful teenage daughters, who wants to join the founding group of a new settlement of religious Jews in the West Bank, but first must convince the acceptance committee that she is worthy. Things get complicated when the younger daughter is sexually abused by boys from her youth movement.

The film explores the tension between values and convenience as motivations for settlement and romantic relationships within the Religious Zionist community. The core group scrutinizes anyone seeking to join, perhaps out of concern for the settlement's future or perhaps out of selfishness to exclude those who might rely on others for help. The group pressures Rachel to marry a well-known cantor, Moshe Weinstock, a spoiled and self-centered man. His behavior contrasts sharply with the values of Religious Zionism, as depicted in the film shown to the Bnei Akiva youth group—Operation Yonatan, starring Yehoram Gaon.

== Cast ==
- Michaela Eshet as Rachel Gerlik
- Hani Furstenberg as Tami Gerlik
- Maya Maron as Esti Gerlik
- Moshe Ivgy as Yossi
- Assi Dayan as Motkeh
- Oshri Cohen as Rafi
- Yehoram Gaon as Moshe Weinstock
- Yehuda Levi יהודה לוי as Yoel
- Avi Grainik as Oded
- Idit Teperson as Shula (as Edith Teperson)
- Itay Turgeman as Gozlan
- Barak Lizork as Yaniv
- Danny Zahavi as Ilan
- Dina Senderson as Inbal
- Ofer Seker as Yair
