= Medieval contraception =

Birth control in the medieval period

Medieval contraception is a debated topic among historians, though methods of contraception have been developed not just in modern times. In ancient times, women attempted to protect themselves from unwanted pregnancy with various means and practices, as evidenced by ancient records. Ancient and medieval manuscripts provide glimpses into diverse birth control practices.

== Spermicidal ==
As the first official record of contraception, an Egyptian spermicidal recipe from the period around 1525 BC was to "mix grated Acacia leaves and honey and soak a gauze bandage to be inserted into the vagina." This type of contraceptive tampon could have had a spermicidal effect due to the acacia lactic acid contained in the sap which is proven effective as a spermicide.

== Plant Based Oral Contraceptives ==
Most of the indigenous peoples around the world, as well as from European antiquity all the way to the Middle Ages, contain linkages to point to the use of plant based oral contraceptives. This type of contraception is currently regaining attention in some scientific circles and amongst some historians. Plant-based contraceptives and abortifacient drugs may have been widely used in antiquity and the Middle Ages, but much knowledge about ancient forms of medicinal contraception appears to have vanished. Because of this, plant-based oral contraception in history is often contested, though archaeological and written record shows evidence that drugs were a reliable way to prevent conception or even induce early-term abortions. Their absence from many historical texts could be due to their likely presence in anti-fertility lore which was almost exclusively limited to midwives as professionals. These bits of folklore, combined with archaeological written records, allude to what was likely a “thriving oral culture of contraception.” Silphium was a plant that grew in the hills near the Greek city-state of Cyrene, Libya, located in North Africa. This plant was one example of an oral contraceptive in ancient times, based partly on Pliny's statement that it could be used "to promote the menstrual discharge."

== Physical Contraceptive Barriers ==
The ancient philosopher Aristotle wrote in The History of Animals VII, part 3 (350 B.C.E) that to avoid conception women must prevent the "womb" from coming in contact with the male sperm by rubbing it with cedar oil, lead ointment or incense, mixed with olive oil. The lead ointment was highly toxic, but the oil was proven to decrease sperm mobility by Marie Stopes in the 1930s. Around 300 AD saw the introduction of the contraceptive sponge which was inserted into the vagina, so as to prevent conception by absorbing the semen. An Indian prevention recipe from the 8th Century has survived throughout time. The cervical opening was brushed with a mixture of honey and ghee and is then rubbed or mixed with oil rock salt and used to physically block semen. The sticky honey likely reduced sperm motility, and rock salt is now regarded as a spermicide. The works of Iranian author Ibn Sina (980-1037), also known as Avicenna, has shown to have had 20 different contraceptives in his medical encyclopedia.

== Behaviors ==
While physical methods of contraception were likely present due to their presence and referencing in historical texts, there are also some purposeful behaviors thought to be utilized in preventing unwanted pregnancy. These methods could have been used either out of personal preference, or with heavy influence from religion. Likely the most common used and easiest to hide from the church at the time was coitus interruptus.

=== Coitus interruptus ===
Coitus interruptus is an example of a contraceptive behavior utilized in medieval times. This is the case with onanism, which is clearly distinguished from masturbation. In the biblical telling, Onan was unwilling to procreate with Tamar, so he withdrew before climax and “spilled his seed on the ground”. Masturbation is seen as a form of self arousal, while onanism was viewed as a form of contraception. U.S. judge John T. Noonan has written extensively on this topic and believed that the first, certain dated reference to onanism appeared in the ninth century. At the beginning, practices of coitus interruptus has been linked to circles of prostitution and illicit love affairs within the Middle Ages. From there, it took the decisive step towards widespread practice and began entering into conventional sexual relationships, such as marriage. The trigger of this development – assuming other mental and moral conditions – was provided by economic hardship. Population control was not a brand new topic during the time. "If too many children are being born," stated the ancient Greek philosopher Plato, writing of the ideal city, "there are measures to check propagation." Medieval demography has been linked to the church's teaching on birth control. Demographic statistics of the early fifteenth century provide evidence that married couples were limiting the number of offspring they had, likely with such methods as coitus interruptus. This was particularly true with poor couples and in periods of economic hardship. The purposeful prevention of pregnancy is brought into juxtaposition with the church's moralist denunciation of contraception.

=== The Catholic Church ===
The Catholic Church sees procreation as an essential end of marriage, and entering into an intentionally childless marriage nullifies the sacrament of matrimony. This goes back as far as Pope Gregory IX and his decretal dating from between 1227 and 1234 which declared that marriages contracted by parties intending to avoid having offspring were ipso facto null.

== See also ==
- History of birth control
