= Richard Wharton =

Richard Wharton may refer to:

- Richard Wharton (actor), American actor
- Richard Wharton (15th-century MP) for Appleby, 1419 and Westmorland
- Richard Wharton (Secretary to the Treasury) (c. 1764–1828), MP for Durham, 1802 and 1806
