= Margie Profet =

American academic

- Born: August 7, 1958 (age 68); Berkeley, California, U.S.
- Disappeared: 2005
- Status: Found 2012
- Education: Harvard University; University of California, Berkeley
- Scientific career
- Fields: Evolutionary biology

Margaret J. "Margie" Profet (born August 7, 1958) is an American evolutionary biologist with no formal biology training who created a decade-long controversy when she published her findings on the role of Darwinian evolution in menstruation, allergies and morning sickness. She argued that these three processes had evolved to eliminate pathogens, carcinogens and other toxins from the body.

== Career ==
A graduate of Harvard University, where she studied political philosophy with Harvey Mansfield and graduated in 1980, and University of California, Berkeley, where in 1985 she received a bachelor's degree in physics, Profet returned to school in 1994, studying mathematics at the University of Washington in Seattle, where she was awarded a "visiting scholar" position in the astronomy department, an allied discipline. Several years later, she returned to Harvard, once again to study math.

When Profet won a MacArthur Fellowship in 1993, international media took notice. New York Times reporter Natalie Angier called Profet's theory that menstruation protected some female mammal's reproductive canals a "radical new view". Scientific American, Time, Omni, and even People Magazine all followed with in-depth profiles of the 35-year-old "maverick" scientific prodigy.

Profet went on to publish two equally controversial bestselling books, 1995's Protecting Your Baby-To-Be: Preventing Birth Defects in the First Trimester and a 1997 follow up, Pregnancy Sickness: Using Your Body's Natural Defenses to Protect Your Baby-To-Be. Supporters—including U.C. Santa Barbara anthropologist Donald Symons and U.C. Berkeley toxicologist Bruce Ames—considered her work a pioneering analysis of evolutionary theory in a never-before-studied, everyday context. In 2000, Cornell University researchers Samuel Flaxman and Paul Sherman provided evidence supporting Profet's hypothesis that "morning sickness" is an evolved trait that protects the mother and her fetus against toxins ingested by the mother.

In 2008, Paul Sherman and Janet Shellman-Sherman found that Profet's theory that allergies are evolved ways to expel toxins and carcinogens—the so-called "toxin" or "prophylaxis hypothesis"—may explain a mysterious observation dating back to 1953 and replicated many times since: People with allergies are at much lower risk for some types of cancers, especially malignancies of tissues that are directly exposed to the external environment, even including the brain tumor glioma.

While research has for decades supported Profet's prophylaxis hypothesis applied to carcinogens, Stanford University Medical School and Yale University Medical School researchers in 2013 reported similar experimental support applying it to toxins, specifically bee venom. Bee venom induces allergic reactions in some people that can include anaphylactic shock and death. Both studies were published in the journal Immunity.

Yale immunology researchers Noah W. Palm, Ruslan Medzhitov, et al. reported that Phospholipase A2—the major allergen in bee venom -- "is sensed by the innate immune system" and induces an immune response in mice that can protect against potentially fatal venom doses.

Likewise, injecting mice with a small dose of bee venom conferred immunity to a much larger, fatal dose, Stanford researchers Stephen Galli, Thomas Marichal, and Philipp Starkl found. "Our findings support the hypothesis that this kind of venom-specific, IgE-associated, adaptive immune response developed, at least in evolutionary terms, to protect the host against potentially toxic amounts of venom, such as would happen if the animal encountered a whole nest of bees, or in the event of a snakebite," Galli explained.

The 2011 play The How and the Why by Sarah Treem draws on Profet's work on menstruation.

== Disappearance and discovery ==
Profet vanished from Cambridge, Massachusetts: according to friends and colleagues, in 2005; according to family members, before 2005. Her whereabouts were unknown for more than seven years until she was found in Boston, Massachusetts, after a long ordeal with poverty and illness. She was reunited with her family in Southern California on May 16, 2012, as a result of nationwide attention from a May 2012 Psychology Today article.

== See also ==
- Lists of solved missing person cases
