= Richard Wharton (actor) =

American actor

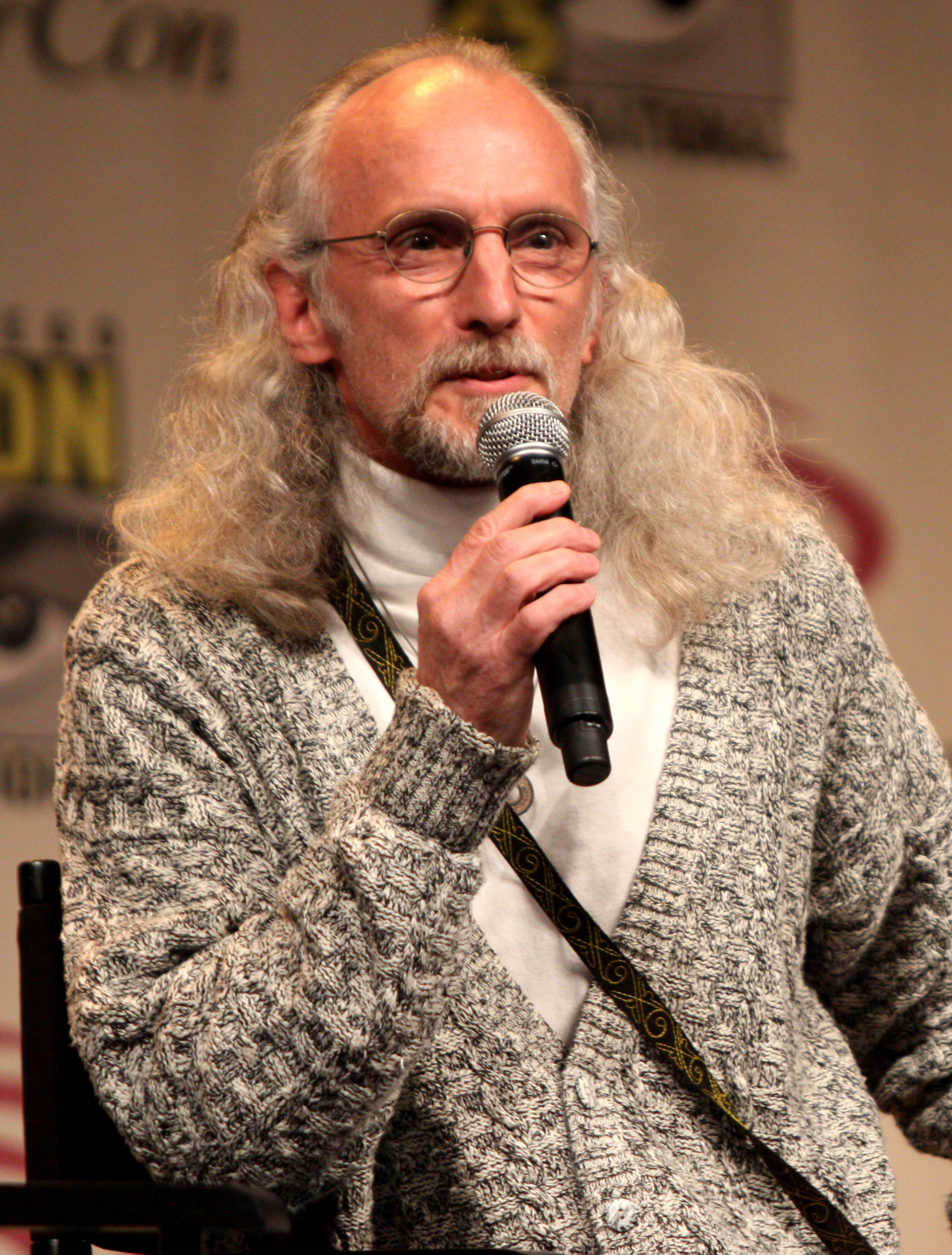
- Born: March 21, 1954 (age 71); Chicago, Illinois
- Occupation: Actor
- Years active: 1986-present

Richard Wharton is an American actor.

Wharton began his career in 1986 in the film Running Scared. In 2012, he appeared as The Hippy in Seven Psychopaths. He has also had several guest roles on television shows like The Mentalist, CSI: Miami, Nip/Tuck, and others.

Wharton is also a stage actor. In 1988, he appeared in Sam Shepard's play Seduced, at the Immediate Theatre Company in Chicago, Illinois. He was nominated for a Joseph Jefferson Award for Actor in a Principal Role in a Play for his performance in that play.

== Filmography ==
=== Film ===
Year	Title	Role	Notes
1986	Running Scared	Punk	
1987	Fatal Confession: A Father Dowling Mystery	Perpetrator	TV movie
1989	Next of Kin	Selkirk Gates	
1990	Men Don't Leave	Nick	
1991	The Borrower	Alien Pilot	
1994	The Fence	Halfway House Clerk	
1998	March in Windy City	Theo	TV movie
2001	Herman U.S.A.	Vern	
2004	Dragon Storm	Remmegar	
2005	The New Partridge Family	Tattoo Parlor Owner	
2005	Path of Destruction	Dr. Van Owen	TV movie
2006	The Key	Tony, The Waiter	Short film
2007	What We Do Is Secret	Whiskey Manager	
2010	TypeA	Dr. Rorke	Short film
2011	Psychosis	Professor Montana	Short film
2011	Sound of My Voice	Klaus	
2012	Edge of Salvation	Alfred	
2012	Seven Psychopaths	The Hippy	
2013	Autumn Wanderer	Dad	
2013	Thor: The Dark World	Asylum Patient	
2018	Art Prison	Chester Greggs	TV movie
2020	The Nowhere Inn	Uncle	

=== Television ===
Year	Title	Role	Notes	References
1987	Father Dowling Mysteries	Perpetrator	Episode: "Fatal Confession"	
2000	Charmed	Professor	Episode: "Animal Pragmatism"	
2000	Will & Grace	Gerald	Episode: "Sweet (and Sour) Charity"	
2001	Buffy the Vampire Slayer	Homeowner	Episodes: "Bargaining" (Parts 1 and 2)	
2002	Haunted	Ray	2 episodes	
2002	Star Trek: Enterprise	Jossen	Episode: "The Seventh"	
2003	Carnivale	Townie	Episode: "Insomnia"	
2002-2004	The Drew Carey Show	Construction Worker; Gerald	2 episodes	
2004	Deadwood	Cowboy Outside Bunkhouse	Episode: "Bullock Returns to the Camp"	
2004	Drake & Josh	Hobo	Episode: "Mean Teacher"	
2004	Grounded for Life	Customer	Episode: "Mystery Dance"	
2005	CSI: Crime Scene Investigation	Kenny Valdez	Episode: "Committed"	
2005	Six Feet Under	Dove Man	Episode: "Singing for Our Lives"	
2005	The Comeback	Fredo	Episode: "Valerie Stands Out on the Red Carpet"	
2006	Crossing Jordan	Pawnbroker	Episode: "Don't Leave Me This Way"	
2006	How I Met Your Mother	Art Professor	Episode: "The Scorpion and the Toad"	
2007	Studio 60 on the Sunset Strip	Photographer	Episode: "The Harriet Dinner: Part I"	
2007	Numb3rs	Homeless Man	Episode: "Thirteen"	
2007	Nip/Tuck	Repo Man	Episode: "Carly Summers"	
2008-2009	The Young and the Restless	Pawn Broker	7 episodes	
2009	Dirty Sexy Money	Raja	Episode: "The Facts"	
2009	10 Things I Hate About You	Cab Driver	Episode: "Won't Get Fooled Again"	
2011	The Mentalist	Man	Episode: "Bloodhounds"	
2011	CSI: Miami	Alligator Pete	Episode: "Hunting Ground"	
2011	Torchwood	Dr. Paul Bell	Episode: "Miracle Day: Rendition"	
2012	Rob	Masseur	Episode: "Romantic Weekend"	
2012	Common Law	Vince West	Episode: "Pilot"	
2012	Bones	Homeless Man #1	Episode: "The Partners in the Divorce"	
2012-2014	Guides	Hobo Joe	6 episodes	
2013	Ray Donovan	Group Leader	Episode: "A Mouth Is a Mouth"	
2014	Newsreaders	Daniel Salter	Episode: "F- Dancing, Are You Decent?"	
2015	Mike & Molly	Homeless Guy	Episode: "Buy the Book"	
2015	Rizzoli & Isles	Old Hippie	Episode: "Fake It 'Til You Make It"	
2016	Major Crimes	The Admiral	Episode: "Present Tense"	
2016	Roadies	Hippie Guy	Episode: Friends and Family"	
2016	NCIS	Squeegee Man	Episode: "Privileged Information"	
2017	Girlboss	Burt Coyote	3 episodes	
2018	Criminal Minds	M.E. Darryl Sutton	Episode: "Mixed Signals"	
2018	UnCorked	Melvin	Main role	
2019	The Affair	Funeral Director	Episode: "Episode #5.1"	
2019	The Politician	Thomas	3 episodes	
2019	Silicon Valley	Man in Pied Piper Ad #2	Episode: Exit Event"	
2021	Mixed-ish	Shaman Dave Sr.	Episode: "Livin' on a Prayer"	
2021	All American	Vegas Priest	Episode: "Roll the Dice"	
2021	Hacks	Bill	Episode: "There Is No Line"	
2021	I Think You Should Leave with Tim Robinson	Ron	Episode: "I need a wet paper towel."	
2022	Days of Our Lives	Dr. Rolf	2022 and after	
