= Martie Cook =

American screenwriter

Martie Cook is an American television screenwriter, producer and teacher. Cook worked as a writer and producer of television and film for ABC, NBC, CBS, and PBS as well as for Warner Bros., 20th Century Fox, Columbia Pictures, and Universal Studios. She developed and teaches the screenwriting program at Emerson College.

== Biography ==
After doing P.A. jobs in Los Angeles, Cook broke into television in the early 90s, writing for comedy series such as Full House, Charles in Charge, Joe's Life and the crime drama One West Waikiki. Cook also served as a writer & producer for Entertainment Tonight, America's Most Wanted, NBC Nightly News, The Today Show, Better Homes and Gardens, and the Emmy-award winning PBS series Zoom. In 2012, Cook developed a military comedy, At Ease, which sold to Jerry Bruckheimer Television and Warner Bros. Television.

Cook is the author of the screenwriting guide, Write To TV: Out of Your Head and Onto the Screen, which covers an extensive range of television writing styles and techniques. It is derived from her teaching experiences at Emerson, and has had three editions. She also teaches on Series Mania Writers' Campus, with fellow television writer Sarah Treem, a week-long intensive on television drama.

== Television ==
Year	Title	Network
1990	Charles in Charge	CBS
1992-1993	Full House	ABC
1993	Joe's Life	ABC
1994	One West Waikiki	CBS
2002	Zoom	PBS
