= The Seventh =

- Star Trek: Enterprise episode
- T'Pol is sent on a mission to capture the fugitive Menos (Bruce Davison)
- Episode no.: Season 2 Episode 7
- Directed by: David Livingston
- Written by: Rick Berman; Brannon Braga
- Production code: 207
- Original air date: November 6, 2002

Guest appearances
- Stephen Mendillo - Vulcan Captain Tavek; Bruce Davison - Menos; Richard Wharton - Jossen; David Richards - Dockmaster; Vincent Hammond - Huge Alien; Coleen Maloney - Vulcan Officer

Episode chronology
← Previous "Marauders"	Next → "The Communicator"
- Star Trek: Enterprise season 2

"The Seventh" is the thirty-third episode (production #207) of the television series Star Trek: Enterprise, the seventh of the second season. The episode aired on UPN on November 6, 2002. In the Star Trek universe, a spaceship has set out from Earth in the 2100s to explore the galaxy.

The Vulcan High Command dispatches T'Pol to capture a fugitive who has eluded them for nearly two decades, and she is joined on her mission by Captain Archer.

== Plot ==
Sub-Commander T'Pol receives a covert mission from the Vulcan High Command, and informs Captain Archer that Admiral Forrest will be contacting him later about it. She resists Archer's enquiries as to the exact nature of the expected diversion, but later meets privately with Archer and asks that he come as well, since she needs someone she trusts. In conversation with Archer, she later reveals that she was trained 17 (Earth) years earlier in reconnaissance retrieval, and now she is to capture the only one of six surgically altered, rogue Vulcan secret agents to have evaded her.

Archer, T'Pol, and Ensign Mayweather easily track the fugitive, Menos, to a cantina on the icy Pernaia Prime moon. After a brief phase-pistol fight, they capture him, but are unable to leave due to a build up of acidic ice. Menos starts to play on T'Pol's sense of fairness and honor. He has a good life, sustaining his family with an honest job, but apparently he is dying. T'Pol, trying to disprove his story, searches for biotoxins in his ship, finding none. Meanwhile, on Enterprise, Commander Tucker finds the continual interruptions of command more than he expected. It gets worse when a Vulcan ship arrives, and he impersonates Archer so as not to let the Vulcans know the Captain is away.

T'Pol also relates to Archer that she's been having recent flashbacks to her previous hunt, where she shot another fugitive called Jossen. Because of the Vulcan cultural aversion to taking life, she received "fullara" treatment on P'Jem, where her memory and emotions of the incident were fully repressed. Back on the planet, Menos organizes an escape by starting a fire, but is recaptured by the away team when his cloaked hiding space is detected, confirming that he was indeed smuggling biotoxins as the Vulcan High Command had indicated. On Enterprise, T'Pol offers her support to Archer should he ever be in need of it.

== Production ==
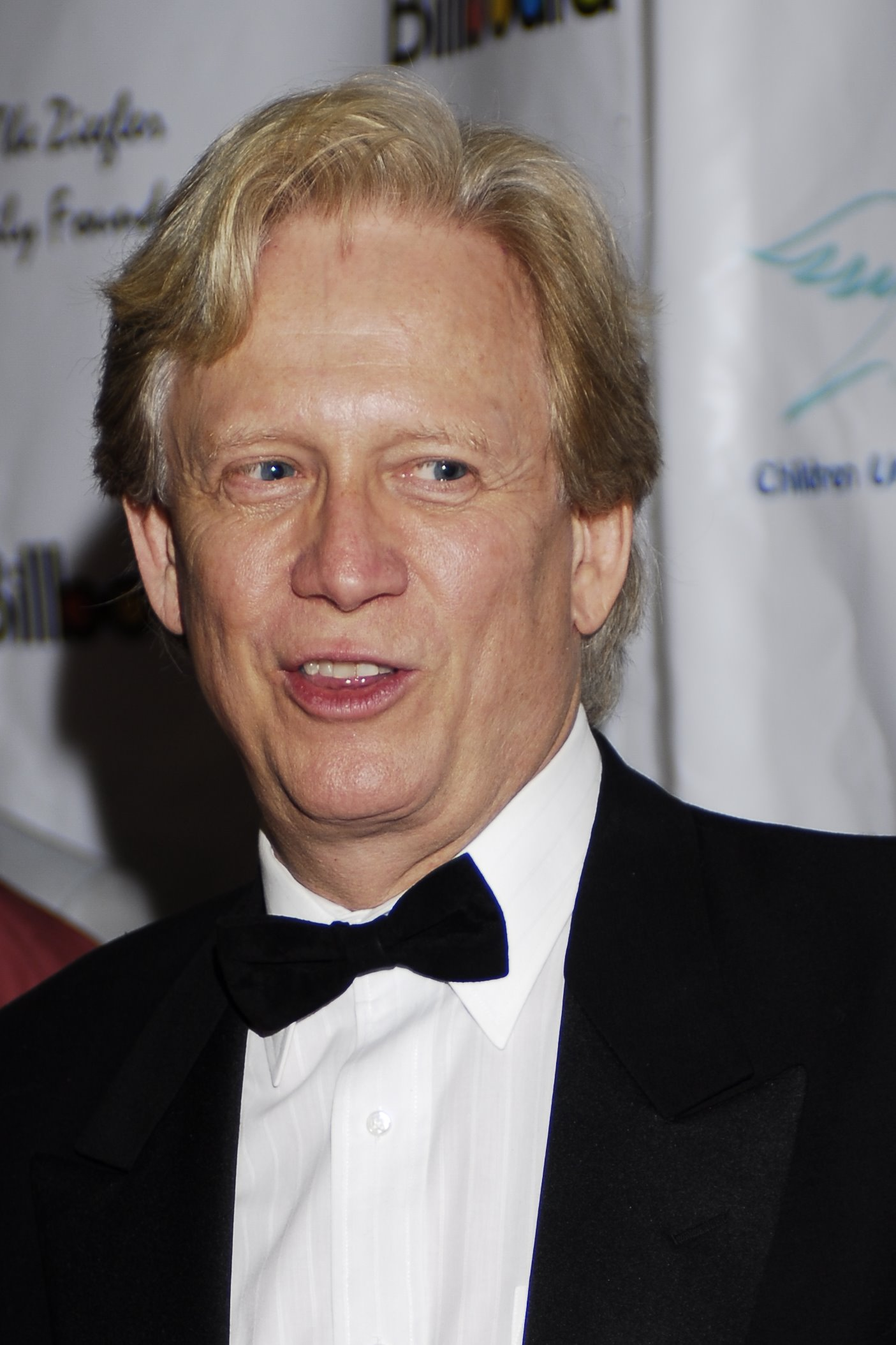
Davison in 2007

Guest star Bruce Davison who plays the Vulcan fugitive Menos, previously appeared in Star Trek: Voyager in the episode "Remember." He is also known for his role in the first two X-Men films as Senator Kelly.

== Reception ==
"The Seventh" was first broadcast on the UPN within the United States on November 6, 2002. According to Nielsen it was watched by 4.82 million viewers. This gave the show a 3.2/5 rating share.

In his 2022 rewatch, Keith DeCandido of Tor.com gave it 8 out of 10. He says his rewatches have given him "much greater appreciation of both the character of T'Pol and the actor playing her". DeCandido gives the show points for the performances of Bakula and Davidson, but deducts points for the silly writing of Commander Tucker.

Den of Geek said this was an important episode for understanding T'Pol. The Digital Fix said this was a T'Pol centric episode and a morality play.

== Home media release ==
"The Seventh" was released for home media use on DVD as part of the second series box set of Star Trek: Enterprise. Season Two was released on Blu-ray Disc August 20, 2013.
