= The How and the Why =

Play by Sarah Treem

- Original language: English
- Written by: Sarah Treem
- Genre: Drama

Premiere
- Date: 2011
- Place: McCarter Theatre

The How and the Why is a play by Sarah Treem. The play depicts two women biologists meeting for the first time, one near the end of her career and the other at the beginning. The older woman has earned fame for her work on the grandmother hypothesis. The younger wants to present a radical new hypothesis to explain why human females menstruate while most mammals do not. The play deals with the workings of science and its impact on the personal lives of women scientists.

The play premiered in 2011 in Princeton, New Jersey at McCarter Theatre, and has since been produced in the Penguin Rep in New York, the Trinity Repertory Company in Rhode Island, the InterAct Theatre Company in Philadelphia, and Timeline Theatre Company in Chicago. It was previously produced by Shakespeare & Company in Lenox, Massachusetts. Hennepin Theatre Trust in Minneapolis slated the play for a run March 10 through March 20, 2016, at New Century Theatre featuring Caroline Kaiser as Zelda Kahn. Theater J in Washington DC ran the play from February 15 to March 12, 2016. It was directed by Shirley Serotsky. The New Jewish Theatre in St. Louis, Missouri produced the play in February 2018. It will be produced at Montgomery Theatre in Souderton, PA in 2025.

The play draws on the work of scientist Margie Profet, who theorized that menstruation clears the body of toxins.
