= List of The Affair episodes =

The Affair is an American television drama series created by Sarah Treem and Hagai Levi. The series premiered on Showtime on October 12, 2014. Its second season premiered on October 4, 2015. On December 9, 2015, the series was renewed for a third season, which debuted on November 20, 2016. On January 9, 2017, Showtime renewed the series for a fourth season, which premiered on June 17, 2018. The series was renewed for a fifth and final season which debuted on August 25, 2019.

During the course of the series, 53 episodes of The Affair aired over five seasons, between October 12, 2014, and November 3, 2019.

== Series overview ==
Season	Episodes	Originally released	
Season	Episodes	First released	Last released
1	10	October 12, 2014	December 21, 2014
2	12	October 4, 2015	December 20, 2015
3	10	November 20, 2016	January 29, 2017
4	10	June 17, 2018	August 19, 2018
5	11	August 25, 2019	November 3, 2019

== Episodes ==
=== Season 1 (2014) ===
No. overall	No. in season	Title	Directed by	Written by	Perspective characters	Original release date	U.S. viewers (millions)
1	1	"101"	Mark Mylod	Story by : Sarah Treem & Hagai Levi; Teleplay by : Sarah Treem	Noah & Alison	October 6, 2014 (online); October 12, 2014 (Showtime)	0.507
Noah Solloway, his wife Helen and their four children, Whitney, Martin, Trevor and Stacey depart for Montauk, New York, on Long Island to spend another summer at the estate of Helen's wealthy parents, the Butlers. Noah is a New York City public school teacher and Williams College alumnus who has recently had a first novel published, but is struggling to write a second, and is constantly undermined by Helen's parents for not being good enough. At a stop for lunch at "The Lobster Roll", a Montauk diner owned by Oscar, the Solloway family encounter Alison Lockhart, who serves as their waitress and assists with their youngest when she begins choking. Noah is intrigued by Alison, who is upset by the incident, and offers her some money to recognize her help, which she refuses. It is the birthday of Alison's dead son, Gabriel, and she is struggling through her day. Later that evening the two meet again by chance on the beach where Alison's extended family is gathered at a bonfire. Noah walks Alison back to her house where he remembers her as flirtatious, inviting him to join her in the outdoor shower as she undresses, which he declines. Alison remembers a casual, friendly conversation with an improper advance by Noah, the shower taking place after Noah has left. When Alison's husband, Cole, arrives back from the bonfire they fight over the differences the two are dealing with after the death of Gabriel and end up having 'angry' sex on the car in the driveway, with Noah looking on after he is drawn back by the shouting. Throughout the season, the memories of both Noah and Alison are periodically interrupted by a current day interrogation conducted by Detective Jeffries, who is investigating a mysterious death.
2	2	"102"	Jeffrey Reiner	Sarah Treem	Noah & Alison	October 19, 2014	0.512
The previous night's activities have Noah worked up, and as the Butler household prepares for its annual summer party, Noah can't escape the allure of Alison, whom he remembers as "trouble". The Solloways become involved with the Lockhart family's horse ranch during a trip to the farmer's market for flowers; at the market Noah encounters Alison again, selling homemade specialty jams with her sister-in-law. That evening, Alison is working at the Butlers' party and Noah takes the opportunity to pursue her further, getting her away for a private meeting on the beach during which he discovers that she is also married. From Alison's perspective, as the day begins we get a glimpse of some mysterious activity the family is engaged in, as she makes a collection from the harbor. Throughout her account, we learn more about the emotional debt owed to her husband's family. She works the catering job for the Butlers in order to be around Noah, and when he asks her if she wants to get away from the house, she goes along with him. They talk on the beach, where he shares feelings about his past and his love for his wife, along with his regrets. They share a passionate kiss. A little more is revealed about the mysterious death being investigated at some point in the future through the police questioning of Noah and Alison.
3	3	"103"	Jeffrey Reiner	Eric Overmyer	Noah & Alison	October 26, 2014	0.599
As the Solloway family is settling in for the summer Noah begins investigating and researching the history of Montauk, aided by Alison, as background for his book. The two are drawn further together while attempting to keep things simply friendly. Alison is revealed to the audience to be self-harming in response to her overwhelming emotions. Confrontation between the locals builds as Cole takes a stand against development progress proposed by Oscar in favor of preserving what makes Montauk special, revealing a complex history between Oscar's family and the Lockharts.
4	4	"104"	Jeffrey Reiner	Melanie Marnich	Noah & Alison	November 2, 2014	0.692
Noah and Alison take a day trip to remote Block Island in order to spend time together as Noah continues with research for his novel. As they tour highlights of the island they share more of themselves in conversation and become ever more intimate with each other. Noah remembers himself as an innocent, struggling under Alison's advances, while Alison's memory is more serious and somber with the undertones of grieving and appreciation for Noah's attentive presence. After Noah receives an emergency call from home which takes his attention they have an argument and part ways, only to run into one another again in a shop. The two get a hotel room for the afternoon and take the last step towards being unfaithful, having sex but arguing further when Alison is evasive afterwards. They make up and return to the hotel but after having sex with Alison again, Noah notices scars on her legs and they argue more. On the ferry back, Alison apologizes and tells Noah she is not the carefree soul he thinks she is, but rather, has a "dark" side (which Noah says he is attracted to). Back on land, as Noah drives Alison home, she tells him about her four year old son who drowned two years ago, leaving her struggling with wanting to die. Their closeness deepens and they make love again that evening at Alison's house, her husband being away.
5	5	"105"	Carl Franklin	Kate Robin	Alison & Noah	November 9, 2014	0.673
Complications and obstacles abound for Alison and Noah with troublesome family matters, keeping the lovers apart for now, but seeking an escape beyond the love nest they have found in Alison's friend Phoebe's empty house while she is away on extended travel. Alison's estranged mother, Athena (Deirdre O'Connell), has shown up unexpectedly, meddling in the care of Alison's beloved grandmother and the relationship with her in-laws. And for Noah, it's the coming-of-age struggle of his oldest daughter, Whitney (Julia Goldani Telles), between right and wrong social behaviors complicated by the meddling of his in-laws and the disagreement with his wife, Helen, on how to manage it all.
6	6	"106"	Carl Franklin	Dan LeFranc	Noah & Alison	November 16, 2014	0.778
The episode opens with Noah's perspective on a night out at a Montauk restaurant/hotel party hangout named The End where he meets up with his best friend, Max (Josh Stamberg), who is struggling after the separation with his wife. Noah witnesses the exchange and use of drugs between Max and his cab driver, whom he later recognizes as having an association with the Lockharts. Alison is present at the party and introduces herself to the pair, playfully toying with Max while Noah watches her smiling. After Max leaves the party late in the night the pair spend the rest of the night together in the hotel and in the morning discuss possible future plans. When Alison leaves in the morning on her bicycle Noah is curious as to where she is heading and follows her to the fishing docks where he observes her picking up a cooler from a boat after which she takes it to the taxi station. When Noah arrives home at 5:30 a.m. his wife is unsuspecting but she confronts him about their recent lack of intimacy and they make plans. Noah asks his daughter Whitney where "one might score some coke" to which she is appalled. When the Solloway family has lunch at "The Lobster Roll" and Max shows up Helen becomes suspicious about the previous night's activities. Noah asks Oscar for help with his book and witnesses an unsettling confrontation between one of the Lockhart brothers and Oscar, deepening his suspicions about Alison's involvement with drug dealing, after which he confronts her back at the ranch. In Alison's perspective, the activities of the day are in effort to support the ranch and she reveals again to Noah her lack of concern for her own welfare. Oscar realizes the connection between Alison and Noah and the Lockharts scramble to protect their illicit assets. Alison tells Noah she wants to start over with him but Noah is now reluctant.
7	7	"107"	Ryan Fleck	Kate Robin	Noah & Alison	November 23, 2014	0.877
Whitney's therapy sessions bring to light "issues" broiling within the family. For Noah, with the end of summer it is time for the family to return home to Brooklyn, but the kids resist having ingrained themselves in Montauk life over the summer, Martin with the Lockhart ranch and Whitney with her own secretive affairs. Tensions are running high all around as Oscar threatens blackmail to Noah about his affair with Alison and Helen's parents have their own drama. Back in Brooklyn, the family begins to settle in to normal life again, and Noah is happy to be home. He seeks help from Max regarding the blackmail and confides to him about an affair in which Noah tells him that "she threw herself at him". After a medical emergency, Noah also admits to Helen he had a "fling" over the summer, which crushes her. Disappointments are revealed in the anger that follows and the two attempt to repair their relationship, extinguishing the fire in Oscar's threat. For Alison, as the close of summer shuts Montauk down, the Lockhart family concerns heighten and Cherry, the family matriarch, confronts Alison about her selfishness. When Cole and his brother confront Oscar about his threat to them, offering peace, he tells them of Alison's betrayal. She escapes to the city, peeks in on Noah's life, and Cole offers her a chance for reconciliation between them. The current day police investigation deepens the suspicion on Noah.
8	8	"108"	Ryan Fleck	Dan LeFranc & Melanie Marnich	Noah & Alison	December 7, 2014	0.759
Four months later, Noah and Helen are progressing through therapy and dealing with family life. Whitney is accused of having an eating disorder when Helen overhears her vomiting in the bathroom. Meanwhile, Alison and Cole's relationship appears to have healed and they have been trying unsuccessfully to have another baby. Alison's mother, Athena, calls to inform her that her grandmother has had a heart attack. After a difficult and honest discussion at the therapist's, Helen agrees to let Noah prove himself and head to Montauk alone to attend a literary award. Despite being aware the event is to honour Helen's father Bruce (John Doman), Alison is unable to back out of her commitment to work the event, and she meets Noah again. Bruce surprises Noah by implying that an extramarital relationship can help produce worthwhile writing. When Alison receives an urgent phone call at the event regarding her grandmother and cannot get transportation, Noah steps in to help her, offering more support after her grandmother dies. Later, when he drives her home to the ranch, they declare their love for one another as she exits the car. Inside the house, she finds a trunk with her son's keepsakes has been placed in her room and she floods with emotion as she goes through them.
9	9	"109"	Jeffrey Reiner	Story by : Dan LeFranc; Teleplay by : Melanie Marnich & Kate Robin	Alison & Noah	December 14, 2014	0.837
Alison travels to spend time with Noah in the city and they end up at Noah's family home, having sex in Helen and Noah's bed. Afterwards, when she goes with Noah to look at a small apartment Alison gets angry at Noah's talk of long-term timing and flees back to Montauk. Noah tidies away evidence of his betrayal, and in the process finds a positive pregnancy test in the kitchen waste basket. Whitney admits the test is hers, and that she has an abortion scheduled for the following day. Alison has a one night stand with Oscar, after which he tells her that the Lockhart ranch is heavily in debt. Alison confronts Cherry, insisting she tell her children the truth but she threatens to tell Cole about her affair. Meanwhile, Noah goes to Whitney's appointment in the hope the father of her baby will attend. When Scott Lockhart appears, Noah attacks him. Alison is thrown into despair and seriously self-harms herself, subsequently relating to a doctor the full story of Gabriel's death. Afterwards, she considers suicide by drowning in the ocean but is stopped when she thinks she hears Gabe's voice calling to her. Alison tells Cole about the ranch, and insists that she has to leave Montauk. Noah decides to leave Helen, and during the ensuing argument Helen discovers Alison's underwear in their bedroom. Noah leaves Brooklyn on the train, calling Alison to tell her he is coming for her. At the train station, Cole catches up with Alison and says he will leave Montauk with her. Noah interrupts their moment, and Alison boards the train alone.
10	10	"110"	Jeffrey Reiner	Sarah Treem	Noah & Alison	December 21, 2014	0.951
Now living alone, Noah indulges in a string of random sexual encounters and ends up in a disorderly conduct suspension from his teaching job. While serving his suspension in a New York City Department of Education rubber room, he spends his time wisely and completes the first draft of his book, which is positively received by his editor. Alison spends time in a spiritual retreat with Athena before returning to Montauk to discuss the future with Cole. After Helen's mother uncovers CCTV coverage of Noah attacking Scott Lockhart at the clinic, Helen unexpectedly invites Noah back home. He returns to a confrontation with Whitney over her relationship with Scott, for which Helen wants to press charges for statutory rape. Alison and Cole are called to the Lockhart ranch, where Whitney has arrived to warn the family of Scott's imminent prosecution. Noah receives contact from Alison informing him of Whitney's whereabouts, and he leaves with Helen to fetch her. Upon arrival at the Lockhart ranch they are greeted by Alison, and Cherry tries to talk them out of pressing formal charges. Tensions are high between all present and when Scott comes down the stairs as the Solloways are leaving Noah again attacks him. Cole stops the attack with gunfire, and is eventually talked down by Alison. Helen and Whitney leave, but Noah stays with Alison. In flashforwards, Jeffries closes the net on Noah and ultimately arrests him for Scott's murder.

=== Season 2 (2015) ===
No. overall	No. in season	Title	Directed by	Written by	Perspective characters	Original release date	U.S. viewers (millions)
11	1	"201"	Jeffrey Reiner	Sarah Treem	Noah & Helen	September 25, 2015 (online); October 4, 2015 (Showtime)	0.815
Noah and Helen begin divorce proceedings. Helen has begun a casual relationship with Max.
12	2	"202"	Jeffrey Reiner	Sarah Treem	Alison & Cole	October 5, 2015 (online); October 11, 2015 (Showtime)	0.547
Alison's summer retreat is interrupted by a visit from Cole.
13	3	"203"	Anna Boden & Ryan Fleck	Alena Smith	Noah & Alison	October 18, 2015	0.648
Noah and Alison get to know their hosts, and Noah asks Alison to marry him. Whitney interrupts the couple's happiness.
14	4	"204"	John Dahl	Anya Epstein	Helen & Noah	October 25, 2015	0.869
A court order prevents Noah and Alison from living together. Helen has a disastrous day that culminates in her arrest for driving under the influence. Taking over the childcare, Noah briefly takes the children to his father's house, and then to a motel, where Martin falls ill.
15	5	"205"	Laura Innes	Sharr White	Alison & Cole	November 1, 2015	0.859
Alison is quickly unhappy in her position as Yvonne's assistant, and disgusted to learn how she is depicted in Noah's new novel. Increasingly insecure in her presence in Hudson Valley, she returns to Montauk. Cole grows closer to Luisa, but then has sex with Alison. Scott sees them together in their house.
16	6	"206"	Jeffrey Reiner	David Henry Hwang	Helen & Noah	November 8, 2015	0.891
Martin's condition worsens, and Helen kicks her mother out of the house for assuming it was just stress. By his bedside, Noah and Helen agree to cease hostilities and divorce amicably. Alison is living at the Sousanna Institute with her mother, and does not wish to return to her life with Noah. They argue, which leads to a sexual encounter. Alison tells Noah that she is pregnant.
17	7	"207"	Anna Boden & Ryan Fleck	Abe Sylvia	Alison & Cole	November 15, 2015	0.787
Alison is now living with Noah in New York city. Alison is uncomfortable in Noah's literary world, and undermined by his new publicist, Eden. Her mother disapproves of her plan to sell her house in Montauk. Noah returns home too late to pick up the Thanksgiving turkey, and over dinner Alison confronts him over his depiction of her in his book. In Montauk, Cole is unable to tell Luisa he loves her and pushes her away. After reading Noah's book, he has dinner with his family and is stunned to learn that his grandfather was a child killer, supposedly cursing the Lockhart brothers' children to not survive in return. Whitney arrives, hoping to speak to Scott, and Cole takes her to Noah and Alison's apartment. Cole apologizes to Luisa and they make up.
18	8	"208"	Laura Innes	Sharr White	Helen & Noah	November 22, 2015	0.844
Helen accompanies Whitney to a campus tour of the university she and Noah attended. Whitney is unenthusiastic, and eventually tells Helen that she does not wish to go to college and plans to become a model. Unexpectedly, Noah's book tour brings him onto the campus at the same time, and he invites Helen to his reading. Noah reads a passage that relates to his relationship with Helen and his feelings at the time of his affair. Helen and Noah eat together and reminisce over the past. From Noah's perspective, at his reading he begins a passage relating to Alison, but changes upon noticing Helen is present. A student journalist attempts to goad him by insulting his work. After Helen leaves, a drunken Noah attempts to assault the journalist. Eden decides to use the incident to promote Noah as a 'bad boy'. Noah and Eden kiss and nearly have sex, but Eden leaves.
19	9	"209"	Jeffrey Reiner	David Henry Hwang & Alena Smith	N/A	November 29, 2015	0.916
All four characters face separate trials during the night of a major storm. Helen re-encounters Vik Ullah, Martin's surgeon, and sneaks him into the Solloway house so they can have sex. After encountering Helen's children, Vik quickly departs. Facing the sale of his house, Cole reacts selfishly upon learning Luisa cannot have children. After experiencing a vision of Gabriel, he eventually burns the house down. Noah is stranded at a house party, where Eden suggests they have sex. Noah then enjoys the sight of two young women kissing, before discovering that one of them is Whitney. Fleeing the party in shame, Noah learns that Alison has gone into labor but cannot traverse the roads in the storm. Alison gives birth in hospital with minimal support, and when Noah eventually arrives she does not wish to see him.
20	10	"210"	Scott Winant	Anya Epstein	Noah & Alison	December 6, 2015	0.833
Alison fails to attend a couple's therapy session, and Noah talks to the therapist alone, revealing that his divorce from Helen has been finalized. He explains his ambitious concept for a novel about Omar Bradley, and feelings about the qualities that make a man exceptional in relation to his own life, as well as the events of the night of the storm. Meanwhile, Alison struggles with medical school and considers dropping out of her class. Outside the apartment, she sees a dishevelled Scotty, who proposes that they buy the Lobster Roll together. Seeing Joanie, Alison's baby, Scotty immediately suspects that she is Cole's daughter. Alison contacts Cole to share her concerns about Scotty, and is amazed to find him living in the city and engaged to Luisa. Despite the apparent progress made in the therapy session, Noah still fails to tell Alison about his divorce.
21	11	"211"	Michael Slovis	Story by : Abe Sylvia; Teleplay by : Abe Sylvia & Sharr White	Cole & Noah	December 13, 2015	0.989
Cole and Luisa plan their wedding. After an encounter with Scotty, Cole suggests that he instead buys the Lobster Roll, with Alison as his business partner. Cole and Alison are successful at the foreclosure auction, and an intoxicated Scotty arrives and tries to stake his claim on the business. Cole convinces Scotty to check into rehab. On Alison's last day of class, Noah learns she has dropped out and fears she has left him. Traveling to Montauk, he has a confrontation with Max and learns of his relationship with Helen. Noah finds Alison at the Lobster Roll, and she asks him to accept her decision to buy the restaurant with Cole.
22	12	"212"	Jeffrey Reiner	Sarah Treem	Noah & Alison	December 20, 2015	1.111
On Cole and Luisa's wedding day, Noah comes to Montauk where Alison has been living over the summer. Alison tells him she wants to continue managing the Lobster Roll for longer than they had planned. Helen attends the wedding as Margaret's guest. Alison becomes emotional at the ceremony and leaves early. From Noah's perspective, she immediately tells him that he may not be Joanie's father. Claiming their relationship is now meaningless, Noah tells Alison he never wants to see her again. Helen finds him drinking and they talk on the beach together. When driving Helen back to the Butler house, Noah loses focus on the road and asks Helen to drive instead. Noah takes her hand, and as they look at each other the car strikes Scott Lockhart dead. Noah sees a figure in the bushes observing the accident. He takes Helen home and promises her he will take care of everything. From Alison's perspective, after leaving the wedding she encounters Scott at the Lobster Roll. After his stay in rehab, Scott expects Cole to honor his promise to make him a partner of the restaurant, but Cole is reluctant to agree. Scott begins drinking and tells Alison that he is prepared to tell Cole that he is Joanie's father if she doesn't. Alison then tells Noah that Joanie is not his daughter and leaves before he can respond. Walking along the roadside, she finds an intoxicated Scott, who asks her to sell him part of her share in the Lobster Roll, and then propositions her for sex. Alison pushes Scott into the road as Noah's car speeds past and strikes him. She watches the scene but does not approach Noah, who turns away and returns to the car. Alison returns to the Lobster Roll, where Noah arrives and reaffirms his love for her. Detective Jeffries finds evidence that Alison was at the scene of the crime, and Gottlief suggests to Noah that they call him as a witness to cast suspicion on Alison. Alison suggests that he instead testifies that Helen was driving, which Noah is equally reluctant to do. Faced with a choice between incriminating Alison or Helen, Noah suddenly addresses the judge in court and confesses to killing Scott.

=== Season 3 (2016–17) ===
No. overall	No. in season	Title	Directed by	Written by	Perspective characters	Original release date	U.S. viewers (millions)
23	1	"301"	Jeffrey Reiner	Sarah Treem	Noah	November 11, 2016 (online); November 20, 2016 (Showtime)	0.600
Shortly after his release from prison following a three-year sentence, Noah reunites with Helen and his three younger children at his father's funeral. He is awkward around the children and rebuffs Helen's attempts to plan their family's future, and also experiences recurring visions of a guard from his prison. Now a part-time creative writing teacher at a New Jersey university, Noah berates a student, Audrey, to tears in his class. A flashback to Helen's first visit to Noah in prison suggests he took responsibility for Scott's death to make amends for his affair with Alison. Noah meets Juliette, a professor in medieval literature, who is fascinated by his controversial presence on campus. Juliette invites Noah to a dinner party, where Audrey is present and questions Noah's attitudes towards women. Noah and Juliette nearly have sex, but he is disturbed by his memories of prison. After attempting to phone Alison, Noah returns to his accommodation where he is stabbed in the neck by an unseen assailant.
24	2	"302"	John Dahl	Anya Epstein	Helen & Alison	November 21, 2016 (online); November 27, 2016 (Showtime)	0.579
One year earlier, Vik has moved in to the Solloways' basement while his casual relationship with Helen continues. Helen continues to visit Noah in prison, but he is upset that she does not bring their children. Helen explains that his numerous injuries have scared the children, and Noah asks her not to return before rejecting a drawing from Stacey. Helen and Vik have dinner with Whitney and her much older boyfriend, Furkat, an artist specializing in photography of female genitals. Whitney is neglecting her studies to act as Furkat's assistant, and when Helen expresses her concern Whitney accuses her of hypocrisy. Helen reveals to Vik that she is visiting Noah, and after an argument Vik moves into her bedroom. In the years following Noah's conviction, Alison revealed to Cole that he is Joanie's father, before suffering a breakdown when Joanie became ill at the same age Gabriel died and abandoning her to Cole's care for six months. After recovering, Alison returns to Montauk. Cole agrees to let her see Joanie, but after speaking to Luisa changes his mind. Alison runs into Oscar and tells him the full story of her disappearance; he convinces her to fight for her daughter. Collecting her redirected mail, Alison receives a pile of letters from Noah. Cole eventually lets her spend an hour with Joanie.
25	3	"303"	Jeffrey Reiner	David Henry Hwang	Juliette & Noah	December 4, 2016	0.662
The day of Juliette and Noah's meeting is retold from her perspective. At the dinner party, Juliette enjoys debating sexual politics with the students, before Audrey reveals she has thoughts about having sex with Noah. Juliette calls her husband in France, who suffers from advanced dementia. Returning Noah's jacket, Juliette finds he has been stabbed and calls an ambulance. Noah's history with John Gunther, the guard from his prison he has been seeing since his release, is revealed. In hospital, Helen assumes the role of his wife, and the police suspect Cole or even Alison of his attempted murder. Upon his discharge, Noah visits Juliette and they nearly have sex again. He realizes that Gunther may have stabbed him and informs the police.
26	4	"304"	John Dahl	Stuart Zicherman	Cole & Alison	December 11, 2016	0.666
Alison now has weekly supervised visits with Joanie, but Luisa struggles to trust her. Alison attends Joanie's fifth birthday party, and fears for her safety when she falls off a pony. Cole is sympathetic towards Alison and her efforts, and argues with Luisa. Both Alison and Cole are questioned about Noah's stabbing, and Luisa gives Cole a false alibi. Cole visits Alison, and after arguing about their situation they have sex. Luisa relents and allows Joanie to spend the night with Alison. Alison is shocked to see Noah driving through Montauk.
27	5	"305"	Jeffrey Reiner	Sharr White	Alison & Noah	December 18, 2016	0.724
Shortly after her return to Montauk, Alison visits Noah in prison and tells him that their relationship is over. Gunther increases his sadistic harassment of Noah. Alison reluctantly agrees to let Noah visit her at home. She tells him she wants a divorce to improve her chances of regaining custody of Joanie. Cole visits her to apologise for the previous night, but still refuses to vouch for her in court. Noah tells Alison he will sign their divorce papers if she visits Block Island with him, apparently hopeful she will fall for him again. On the island, Noah insults Cole but Alison defends him. She tells Noah that they did not really love each other, and she had pursued their affair through wanting to escape her grief over Gabriel. After missing the return ferry, Alison and Noah are forced to spend the night on the island; Noah agrees to their divorce, but insists that his love for Alison was genuine. He tells Alison she will be a good mother to Joanie by being present. After Noah encounters another vision of Gunther, they continue to talk through the night. Noah reveals that he helped his mother to commit suicide, and believes he fell for Alison because she has also watched a loved one die. Noah and Alison have sex, then return to Montauk where they sign the divorce papers. Returning home, Noah sees Gunther in a car behind him and crashes his vehicle.
28	6	"306"	Agnieszka Holland	Alena Smith	Helen & Noah	January 1, 2017	0.480
Helen is unimpressed to learn her parents have got back together, and resists Vik's attempts to become closer to her family. Noah fails to appear for a meeting at Martin's school, where Helen learns that he is at risk of failing. Helen visits Nina's house to try and locate Noah; Nina challenges Helen's perception of her relationship with Noah and the circumstances around Scott's death. Shaken, Helen impulsively visits Max. Despite learning he is engaged, she propositions him and they have sex. Upon learning that their liaison is once again about Helen's feelings for Noah, Max kicks her out. Returning home late, Helen learns that Martin has not returned argues with Vik. Martin arrives and tells Helen that he has been in Pennsylvania with Noah. Confused, Helen drives through the night to Noah's family lake house, encountering him in the water in distress. Noah returns to Juliet's house, learns about her husband's dementia and rebuffs her suggestion that they have sex. The following day, he travels to Pennsylvania to clear out the lake house. Martin arrives following the meeting at his school, and they have dinner with some old school friends of Noah's, who he briefly questions about Gunther. Noah's condition following his stabbing suddenly worsens, and he collapses unconscious until Martin finds him. Noah tells Martin about his role in his mother's death, and Martin agrees to finish school for Helen's sake. The following morning, Noah sees a figure in the lake and enters the water, before realizing it is a vision of himself as a teenager.
29	7	"307"	Jeffrey Reiner	Anya Epstein	Helen & Noah	January 8, 2017	0.654
Helen drives Noah back to New York and allows him to recuperate in her basement apartment. Vik reluctantly examines Noah's injuries but refuses to prescribe him any more painkillers, believing he is addicted to opioids. Whitney visits the house and Noah has a violent altercation with Furkat. Whitney is furious that Helen has allowed Noah back into their lives. She then lies to Vik that Noah has left; on learning the truth, Vik breaks up with Helen and leaves. Meanwhile, Noah experiences a vision of Gunther inside the house and becomes disoriented again. Helen implores him to stop punishing himself, and tells him she forgives him. They have sex, but Noah turns violent and Helen is left in tears.
30	8	"308"	John Dahl	Stuart Zicherman	Alison & Cole	January 15, 2017	0.612
When called as a witness in Joanie's visitation hearing, Luisa unexpectedly declares that she believes Alison should have joint custody. Blindsided by his wife's intervention, Cole reluctantly agrees to the proposal. Alison is asked to visit the institute where she received treatment to help counsel a young bereaved mother, who she persuades not to give up on living. She is offered a job at the institute, which she excitedly informs Cole of. Cole accuses her of being impulsive and not thinking of how the job would affect Joanie. At a bar, Alison is surprised by Helen; the two women share their views of Noah, and Alison apologises for their affair. She also tries to confess her role in Scott's death, but Helen cuts her off. Meanwhile, Cole is briefly arrested after his alibi for the night of Noah's stabbing is found to be false. Alison visits him in jail and he confesses that he was visiting the institute to ascertain her mental state, as he is still in love with her. Unable to hide the truth from Luisa, Cole visits Alison again overnight and she suggests that if he returned to her he could not pretend to be a better person than her any longer. Cole returns home and re-commits to his life with Luisa.
31	9	"309"	John Dahl ("Helen"); Jeffrey Reiner ("Noah")	Sarah Sutherland & Sarah Treem	Helen & Noah	January 22, 2017	0.793
The morning after Vik's departure and Noah's assault, Helen impulsively takes the children to Montauk. Her parents are disappointed to learn that Vik has left her, and after they press her for an explanation Stacey reveals that she knows Noah was in their house. Helen tells her family that she killed Scott Lockhart, and determines to confess to Cherry. Unable to go through with the confession, Helen retreats to the bar where she encounters Alison. From Helen's perspective, Alison confesses to her role in Scott's death but refuses to accompany Helen to Cherry's house. The following day, Helen also confesses to Vik and they make amends. Noah follows Gunther's wife to his home, where he encounters a very differently mannered man to the figure from his visions. Gunther convinces him that he has not been following him and Noah flees. On the train back to New Jersey, Noah experiences a flashback of Gunther reading to him from his new autobiographical manuscript in prison; the novel contains passages suggesting Noah wished for his mother's death, which he has no recollection of writing. Gunther accuses him of wanting to save Alison to make up for killing his mother. Back at his apartment, Noah finally realizes that the Gunther he has been seeing is a manifestation of his subconscious, and remembers stabbing himself in the neck.
32	10	"310"	Jeffrey Reiner	Story by : Sharr White; Teleplay by : Sarah Treem & Sharr White	Juliette & Noah	January 29, 2017	0.725
Months later, Noah is spending the winter in Paris and has consummated his affair with Juliette. Juliette's husband, Etienne, suddenly recovers his lucidity, though continues to mistake Juliette for his first wife. Juliette finally retires Etienne from his university position, having fraudulently requested a sabbatical for him for the last three years. As a consequence, her own position is threatened. Meanwhile, Noah learns that Furkat is in Paris for an exhibition with Whitney, who remains hostile towards him. At dinner with Juliette, Noah urges her to return to Etienne but she refuses, telling him that Etienne is a serial adulterer, until she receives a call telling her that he has died. At Furkat's exhibition, Noah witnesses Whitney's unhappiness and intervenes when Furkat hits her. He eventually convinces Whitney to leave the situation by acknowledging the similarities between himself and Furkat. Noah urges Juliette not to blame herself for Etienne's death. As Whitney wishes to return home, Noah and Juliette bid each other a fond farewell. Arriving in New York on Christmas Eve, while he is still reluctant to spend time with Helen and Vik, Noah recognizes how much his relationship with his family has improved.

=== Season 4 (2018) ===
No. overall	No. in season	Title	Directed by	Written by	Perspective characters	Original release date	U.S. viewers (millions)
33	1	"401"	Mike Figgis	Sharr White	Noah & Helen	June 17, 2018	0.477
Flashforward: In Montauk, Noah meets with Cole to talk about a missing person. Six weeks earlier: Noah has moved to Los Angeles, to be closer to Helen and the kids, who have moved with Vik. Noah is an English teacher at a charter school in Compton. Noah shows special interest in one of his students, Anton. Helen is having a hard time adjusting to life in Los Angeles, and keeps imagining earthquakes happening. She sees a therapist for her anxiety. Noah goes to dinner with Helen, Vik, Trevor and Stacey, and he finds out his son might be gay. In private, Helen tells Noah that they should see less of each other, as she believes he is the reason for her anxiety. Back at home, when getting ready for bed, Vik collapses in the bathroom and Helen rushes to him.
34	2	"402"	Rodrigo García	Sarah Treem	Cole & Alison	June 24, 2018	0.457
Flashforward: Noah and Cole sit in a vehicle and are joined by Anton. In Montauk, Cole has a business meeting with investors about franchising the Lobster Roll; and Alison shows up late to the meeting, angering Cole. Cole and Luisa go to dinner with the investors, and Alison misses the dinner completely. Luisa expresses her frustration to Cole about her dependence on him because she's not a legal U.S. citizen. At work, Alison counsels a grieving mother who has lost her child. Alison meets Ben, a former Marine employed by the Veterans Health Administration. Later, Alison is angrily confronted in her office by the grieving mother's husband who chokes her, but Ben hears the commotion and rushes in and saves Alison. The husband is then taken by the police. Alison and Ben go for coffee where he discusses his PTSD and that he's in AA. The next day, Alison gets a call from Ben, who asks her out.
35	3	"403"	Colin Bucksey	Katie Robbins	Noah & Helen	July 1, 2018	0.559
Flashforward: Noah, Cole and Anton are driving in Philadelphia looking for a missing Alison. They learn that Ben was last person she spoke to. At the school, Noah brings up Anton at a faculty meeting calling him "brilliant" but expresses concerns about him and his home life. Noah later learns that Anton is the son of the principal, Janelle Wilson. Noah later apologizes to Janelle about the comments he made. In the classroom, Noah and the students discuss their next assignment: reading The Waste Land. Anton expresses his objection to reading it because it's not relevant to them and suggests different authors. Noah tells his students that they have collectively more power than they think, and this sparks an impromptu walkout led by Anton, with the rest of the school following suit. The police show up and Noah becomes the main person the media speaks with, where he calls the walkout school sanctioned. Some of the teachers go to a bar afterward, and Janelle shows up. Noah speaks with Janelle about disciplinary practices. In the parking lot, Noah kisses Janelle. Helen and Vik learn he has late stage pancreatic cancer and does not want treatment for it. Vik is being honored at a gala, and Helen breaks her promise by telling Vik's mother about his condition. Vik tells Helen that his parents sacrificed everything for his success. Vik's last wish is to have a baby with Helen.
36	4	"404"	Rodrigo García	Sarah Treem	Alison & Cole	July 8, 2018	0.470
Flashforward: Cole speaks with Detective Jeffries over the phone about Alison missing. Alison goes to a work conference about EMDR therapy and meets Ben there. They use the EMDR techniques on each other and Alison mentions her fear of water, but not her son's death. Alison and Ben rent a boat and go onto the ocean as a form of immersion therapy. On the boat, Alison opens up and tells Ben about her son's death, as well as her past addiction to self-injury and her suicide attempt. The two kiss but stop themselves from going further. Alison then plunges into the water, before swimming back up. Ben dives in and they float on the water together. At an Alcoholics Anonymous meeting Cole goes to, Ben is also present and speaks about an unnamed woman who he recently met that he is attracted to (Alison), but mentions that he also has a wife and kids. Luisa wants Alison to renounce her custody of Joanie, so she could be her legal guardian, which would help her with her immigration issues. Cole refuses to ask Alison to do this. Cole meets with his mother and seeks advice about marriage. When picking up Joanie from Alison, he runs into Ben who has arrived for a date with Alison. Cole confronts Ben about him having a wife, but Ben declares his marriage is over and promises he'll tell Alison himself. Cole goes home and finds Luisa has packed up and ready to leave him as she believes Cole still loves Alison. Cole then suggests that he leave instead and go on a walkabout (which his father went on, told by his mother) to help fix their marriage.
37	5	"405"	Jessica Yu	Story by : David Henry Hwang; Teleplay by : David Henry Hwang & Sharr White	Vik & Cole	July 15, 2018	0.538
Vik talks to his parents about his life insurance and the money that will go to them when he dies, but his mother can't bear to talk about it. Vik has a hard day at work when he has to tell the parents of a young girl that she may have liver cancer. At the fertility clinic, Vik and Helen learn the injections aren't working, because Helen hasn't been taking them. Helen tells Vik she can't have a child without Vik being there. Vik then impulse-buys an expensive Porsche and goes for a joy ride with his neighbor Sierra. Back at her house, Vik tells her he has cancer and confesses his feelings about it. The two then have sex. Cole travels to Morro Bay, California for his walkabout. He tracks down the maker of his father's surfboard, Nan, a woman who owns an art gallery and had a relationship with his father. Cole is invited to Nan's, who's hosting a social gathering of bohemians, where he meets Nan's protégé Delphine. Nan and Delphine perform a "ritual", in an attempt to help Cole get over and let go of Alison. However, at the end of it, he realizes that his marriage with Luisa is over and that he still loves Alison.
38	6	"406"	Stacie Passon	Lydia Diamond & Sarah Sutherland	Noah & Alison	July 22, 2018	0.483
Noah goes to pick up Trevor for a concert, but Trevor screams at Noah telling him he doesn't want to go and to leave them alone. Noah then goes to Janelle's to talk about Anton's application letter to Princeton University. Janelle explains that Anton's father (and her ex-husband), Carl, went to Harvard but left because of how he was treated, due to him being black. According to Janelle, Anton is now afraid of doing well, because of his father's experience. Noah gets a phone call and discovers Alison is in jail. In Montauk, Alison gets a mysterious phone call and goes to the home of a man, who introduces himself as her biological father, James. He explains to Alison that he had an affair with her mother when she was their nanny. James then asks Alison for a kidney, for a transplant, but she decides to leave. Before she leaves, he reveals he was the one who saved her from drowning when she was a child. Alison goes home and confronts her mother Athena about the situation. Athena tells Alison that James raped her and they weren't in love as he previously claimed. Alison then goes to the VA center to see Ben, and discovers a woman in his office, who she originally assumes is his secretary, but soon realizes it's his wife; Alison quickly leaves. Alison decides to use Noah's travel gift card and flies to Los Angeles. On the plane ride, she falls asleep on the shoulder of a man sitting next to her. They two begin talking and the man makes a sexual advance on her and Alison throws a drink on him, causing a commotion in the plane and Alison accidentally knocks over the older woman sitting next to her. Alison is arrested and Noah picks her up. On the car ride, Alison has a panic attack, and Noah takes her to Helen and Vik's. Alison and Helen talk, where Alison talks about how she doesn't like how men treat her, Helen responds by telling her to change the narrative and not be a "victim". Helen concludes by telling her, "if you want to change your life, you have to do it now."
39	7	"407"	Colin Bucksey	Story by : Jaquén Castellanos & Sarah Sutherland; Teleplay by : Lydia Diamond & Sarah Sutherland	Helen & Noah	July 29, 2018	0.544
After purchasing a pregnancy test at a grocery store, Helen informs Vik she is not pregnant. He curtly tells her that she is probably entering menopause. Helen runs into her neighbor Sierra, and decides to join her at a "moon circle" retreat at Joshua Tree. At the retreat, Helen meets Sierra's guru, Gael, and other women in attendance. Over dinner, Gael asks the women to write down their fears on a piece of paper. Gael reads the fears aloud, and when Helen imparts knowing advice on motherhood, Gael is impressed and transfers over the title of guru to Helen. Back at their yurt, Sierra tells Helen she likes to sleep with married men because they appear more secure. Then, Sierra and Helen have sex. On their way to a rowdy house party where there is a sensory deprivation tank, Helen tells Sierra to "lay off" married because the affair harms too many people. Later inside the tank, Helen panics. She decides to leave Joshua Tree, drive home, and tell Vik she doesn't want him to die. Noah yells at Helen after a fight with Trevor. Helen tells Noah that Vik has cancer and to give the family space. Noah goes back to his home to find Anton in his kitchen. Anton tells Noah, and later Janelle at her place, that he is thinking of joining the Marines. Carl stops by, surprised to see Noah there, and hears about Anton's plan. They all have a heated conversation about whether Anton ought to visit Princeton before he makes a final decision. Noah and Janelle have sex at Noah's place. Later, Noah is flying with Anton to New York but they miss their connection flight. Noah gets a call from Cole who tells him that Alison is missing. Cole comes to the airport and picks up Anton and Noah.
40	8	"408"	Michael Engler	Story by : Itamar Moses & Sharr White; Teleplay by : Itamar Moses	Cole & Noah	August 5, 2018	0.507
Cole travels from California to Milwaukee hoping to find Alison at a conference she was supposed to be attending. However, he is told that she has not arrived and it's the third day of the conference. Cole finds Ben at the conference and Cole asks him about Alison. Ben says they broke up after he told Alison he had a wife. Cole gets a call from Noah and they talk about Alison's disappearance. Cole drives to Chicago and picks up Noah and Anton at the airport. Athena calls Cole and tells him about Alison's biological father James contacting her. They travel to East Hampton to talk with James. While with James, they get a call from Athena with the news that Alison is dead, from an apparent suicide by drowning. Cole and Noah then go to ID her body. Back in Montauk, they meet with Detective Jeffries at the location where they found Alison's body and he confirms it was a suicide and that Ben had an alibi. Cole, still believing she did not commit suicide, goes to Ben's work and confronts him. Ben chastises both Cole and Noah for the reasons why Alison was so messed up. Outside, Cole attacks Noah, with Cole angry at Noah for not doing more to help Alison when he was with her in Los Angeles, when she clearly needed it.
41	9	"409"	Sam Gold	Sarah Treem	Alison	August 12, 2018	0.595
The episode presents two different versions of events during an encounter between Alison and Ben at Alison's house in Montauk. In the first version, Ben visits Alison after she returns from Los Angeles and confesses to her that he is married, but Alison already knows. Ben has left his wife and wants to be with her. But, Alison doesn't want to repeat her past mistakes. Ben explains that his PTSD, which was caused by killing a teenager whom he thought had a live RPG, put strain on his marriage and he developed a drinking problem. Alison tells Ben the whole truth about her son's death. The two then make-up and have sex. In the second version, much of the same events happen, except Ben is more angry, lies about having a wife, and scolds her for going to Los Angeles. Ben begins to drink and wants to reconcile with Alison, but she wants him to leave. Alison then mentions his wife, which triggers him. Ben blames Alison for seducing him and they fight, which results in Ben throwing her head-first into a cabinet, where she cracks her head and bleeds. Ben then carries Alison's body and throws her into the ocean.
42	10	"410"	Rodrigo García	Story by : Jaquén Castellanos & Katie Robbins; Teleplay by : Katie Robbins & Sarah Treem	Noah, Cole & Helen	August 19, 2018	0.564
At Princeton, Noah and Anton go to a creative writing seminar. Noah catches up with an old friend, Ariel, who is a professor there. After encouragement from Anton, Noah leaves for Alison's funeral. On the way to the church, Cole is told by Luisa that Athena has moved the service to the beach, infuriating Cole. At the service, Cole confronts Athena about Alison being cremated instead of being buried alongside their son Gabriel. Cole believes this type of service is not what Alison would have wanted. Cole angrily stares at Ben during the service. While Alison's urn is being passed around to the mourners to say goodbye, when it's Cole's turn, he takes it and runs. Cole goes to the gravesite for his son with Alison's urn. Cole falls asleep and is awoken by his mother Cherry who comforts him. Cole eventually returns home to Luisa, and they mutually agree that their relationship is over. However, Cole offers to stay married so Luisa can become a U.S. citizen and Joanie's legal guardian. The following morning, Cole takes Joanie on a road trip so they can properly mourn Alison. Two weeks later, Vik is in the hospital with an infection. Helen returns home to find Whitney and her boyfriend there, by surprise, who has returned for Thanksgiving. Helen tells Whitney about Vik's cancer. Vik falls into septic shock and Helen, joined by Sierra, go the hospital. Sierra reveals to Helen that she is pregnant with Vik's child. Helen storms outside and is joined by Noah where they talk. To Helen's surprise, Noah is able to comfort her. Helen wonders if she ever really loved Vik and if their relationship was a matter of convenience. Helen returns to Vik's room where he has recovered and she comforts him. He expresses regret over not seeking treatment and realizes he will be dead soon and is not prepared for it. Helen finds Sierra and tells her now is the time to tell Vik that she is carrying his baby, hoping the news will bring him some comfort. The season ends with her walking up to the roof of the hospital to reflect on everything.

=== Season 5 (2019) ===
No. overall	No. in season	Title	Directed by	Written by	Perspective characters	Original release date	U.S. viewers (millions)
43	1	"501"	Colin Bucksey	Sarah Treem	Noah, Joanie & Helen	August 25, 2019	0.464
Noah meets with actor Sasha Mann, who is set to direct and star in an adaption of Noah's novel Descent. Noah then attends Vik's funeral with Janelle. After the service, Noah witnesses Helen arguing with Vik's mother Priya about whether he should be buried or cremated; because his mother is Hindu, she wants Vik to be cremated. Back at Helen's house, everyone watches a video Vik recorded before he died, and Noah discovers that Whitney and her boyfriend Colin are getting married. After everyone has left, Noah stays behind to clean-up the kitchen and when he takes out the garbage, Helen exclaims "That's Vik's job!" and yells at Noah about how he left her and their four children and that she had to raise them alone. In flashbacks set before Vik's death where he is in hospice, Sierra gives birth to a baby boy, but Vik is unresponsive and soon dies. While Helen is cleaning up Vik's hospital bed, she finds a USB with a note, "For Helen. Play Me." In an unknown future flashforward, an adult Joanie Lockhart, who is married to Paul with two daughters, Thea and Madeline, celebrate Madeline's sixth birthday. Later, Joanie expresses her anxiety to Paul about Madeline finding out she was adopted. Joanie's birthday is also coming up, and she tells Paul, "This is the age that my mother died," which was unknown to him. At night, Joanie mentions that she misses her father, and later she takes a handful of pills that are for anxiety.
44	2	"502"	Colin Bucksey	Katie Robbins & Jaquén Castellanos	Janelle, Helen & Joanie	September 1, 2019	0.417
Janelle video chats with her son Anton who is away at university. Janelle and Noah then to go Vik's funeral, where she realizes they're the only ones not wearing white, per Hindu culture. Janelle is then introduced to Noah's children. After the service, back at Helen's house, Janelle encounters several annoyances; including Helen's father Bruce mistaking her for the wait staff, and Helen asking her to help with a problem with the valet, who she learns is black. Janelle leaves and goes to a meeting with the board of directors at her school regarding her position, that she'll now be co-principal. Janelle goes to her ex-husband Carl's house for advice. Carl tells her not to accept, and instead run for school superintendent. Carl tells Janelle he still wants to be with her and they kiss. Three months later, filming for Descent has begun and Helen and Noah are watching on set. After a scene is filmed, Sasha asks for notes from Helen, and she suggests her character in the film be more strong and less "broken". Sasha then invites her to lunch, but she declines. Helen and Whitney attend a rehearsal for Trevor's school play, where Helen dozes off, which has been a recurring problem. At home, Helen researches online if she has narcolepsy. Helen then accepts an invitation to Sasha's house where he asks her questions for the film. Later, Helen reveals to Sasha that she lost her partner and about her fatigue issue. Sasha introduces Helen to aerial yoga to help her. Back at home, Helen watches the video Vik left for her, where he urges her to live for herself. Flashforward: Joanie throws up the pills. Joanie, who works for an environmental agency, receives her next travel assignment: return to Montauk to complete her erosion study. Joanie arrives in Montauk, which is now partly deserted, filled with shuttered businesses and abandoned homes. She goes to Cole's now abandoned home.
45	3	"503"	Steve Fierberg	Itamar Moses	Noah, Helen & Joanie	September 8, 2019	0.405
Noah is interviewed by Vanity Fair reporter Petra Raines. Noah has dinner with Whitney, where he expresses his doubt that she should marry Colin. On set, Sasha expresses his concerns to Noah about the ending, asking him to rewrite it so his character returns to his wife. Noah and Janelle have been broken up for three months, and she finally calls Noah back to meet. Noah arrives at Janelle's as she is preparing for her campaign for the school board position, which is being led by Carl. Janelle and Carl have also gotten back together. Janelle asks Noah to keep their relationship a secret, so as to not ruin her chances at the position. This angers Noah and he leaves. Noah goes to a karaoke bar where Sasha has invited the film crew after a long day. Noah confronts Sasha about his relationship with Helen. After rewriting the script at night, Noah heads to set, but learns he's no longer permitted on set, and that Sasha has already rewritten the script. At lunch with her mother, Helen learns her father has dementia and has lost most of their money. Margaret wants Helen to move back to New York to help care for Bruce, but Helen wants to stay in Los Angeles. At the karaoke bar, Sasha reveals to Helen that his fiancée died by a drug overdose. Later, a drunk Noah shows up at Helen's house and rants that Sasha is just using her to get to him. Flashforward: Joanie looks at old photographs of her parents at Cole's house. She also has a violent sexual encounter with a bartender.
46	4	"504"	Toa Fraser	Donal Lardner Ward	Noah, Whitney & Joanie	September 15, 2019	0.379
Noah meets with his representatives for the film and discovers that Sasha will be receiving a co-writing credit alongside him and that Sasha has taken creative control over the film. As his jealousy grows, Noah attempts to sabotage Sasha and Helen's relationship during a Halloween party at Sasha's home, by placing a woman's bra in Sasha's bed but he is caught in the act by Sasha and Helen. Whitney and her boyfriend Colin are having issues; their rent is past due and Colin is not working as he does not yet have a work visa. While working at her art gallery job, her artist ex-boyfriend Furkat shows up and invites her to an event, but she declines. Whitney questions what Colin does all day and Colin refuses to show her his paintings as he claims they are not complete. Colin wants to skip the wedding months from now and just get married now, so he could apply for a work visa. Whitney's boss forces her to take her to Furkat's event. At the gallery opening, Furkat attempts to win Whitney back. At an afterparty, an intoxicated Whitney has sex with Furkat, while his gallery collector friend watches. Whitney attempts to stop it, but Furkat promises he could give her her own gallery. Flashforward: In Cole's old home, Joanie cleans up and begins putting everything into garbage bags. Joanie then rides Alison's bike to the graveyard and visits Cole's grave, who died in 2053.
47	5	"505"	Eva Vives	Mike Batistick	Sierra & Helen	September 22, 2019	0.382
Sierra is overwhelmed by being a single mother. On her way to an audition, Sierra leaves Eddie in the car by himself after he finally stops crying and falls asleep. When she returns, she immediately regrets her decision and checks on him. Sierra's mother, Adeline, who is also an actress, is back in town and visits her and Eddie. Sierra finds out from her agent that she got the part and Adeline agrees to babysit Eddie. Adeline runs lines with Sierra to prepare and she ends up making Sierra feel self-conscious and question her own acting choices. The next day, Adeline bails on Sierra for babysitting, claiming she has the flu. Sierra goes to Helen, but she is busy, and Helen tells her "you brought a child into this world, figure it out." However, Stacey agrees to babysit. After the first day of production on the film, Sierra goes to a nightclub and ends up doing cocaine and having sex with the director. Sierra picks up Eddie at Helen's house and Eddie starts crying. Sierra becomes overwhelmed again and drives around the block to hopefully quiet him. She ends up driving erratically and crashes into a large dumpster. After regaining consciousness, she retrieves Eddie from the backseat, who hasn't been hurt. While Helen is working, Noah shows up and tells her he still loves her. Noah wants to give their marriage another chance, but Helen insists she is not in love with him anymore. While visiting Sasha, Helen witnesses him pay off Christianna, the daughter of his dead fiancée, who returns every six months for money. Helen also denies Priya's request to pretend to be Eddie's mother for sake of Vik's memory when Priya's estranged brother visits.
48	6	"506"	Silas Howard	Sarah Sutherland & Jaquén Castellanos	Joanie	September 29, 2019	0.430
In flashforwards set in 2053, Joanie meets EJ, an epigenetic scientist who is studying Montauk's older families, which includes the Lockharts. EJ takes Joanie to the abandoned police station where Joanie reads the police report on her mother's death, learning she died from suicide by drowning. Later that night, EJ invites Joanie to view a supermoon, which sparks a revelation for Joanie. Through research, Joanie discovers there was a supermoon the night Alison died, and that the nor'easter was blowing so strong there was a negative storm surge, meaning the tide would have been pushed out and the water would be too shallow for her to drown. Joanie returns home and Luisa comes over for dinner and they end up discussing Alison and her death. Later that night, Joanie confesses to Paul that she has been cheating on him for years and he kicks her out of the house. Joanie then goes to EJ's apartment where she opens up. After Alison died, Cole and Joanie moved to Vermont, and when Joanie went to college, Cole moved back to Montauk. Cole never remarried and died of a heart attack. Joanie feels guilty about leaving Cole by himself as he got older and resents Alison. Joanie confesses she thinks about suicide all the time. EJ tells Joanie about a theory involving Benjamin Cruz, but she doesn't remember him. Joanie and EJ have sex that night. In the morning, Joanie has a flashback about Ben and remembers him, telling EJ, "I think he killed her."
49	7	"507"	Steve Fierberg	Sarah Sutherland	Noah & Joanie	October 6, 2019	0.372
Noah and Whitney go to Montauk to prepare for her wedding. They arrive at Helen's parents home where they plan on having the wedding. Noah notices Bruce's dementia has worsened, as Bruce doesn't remember who he or Whitney is. Whitney realizes the wedding has become too expensive and they make other plans. Noah and Whitney run into Luisa at the Lobster Roll. Luisa tells them she's moving to New York and she and Cole have separated, and Cole is taking Joanie to Vermont. Whitney confesses to Noah that she cheated on Colin. Noah receives a call from Petra, the Vanity Fair reporter who previously interviewed him, where she tells him that his former publicist Eden has lodged an allegation that he forced her into an unwanted sexual encounter, which he denies. Flashforward: Joanie shows up at Ben Cruz's PTSD clinic under an alias, "Gabrielle". Joanie tells Ben she suffers from PTSD and is seeking treatment. Before an EMDR session, Ben has Joanie sign a release form and begins recording their session. Ben eventually reveals to Joanie that he knows who she is. He confesses that he did indeed kill her, by accident, and blames it on a psychotic break. Ben tells Joanie his fate is in her hands: she can call the police or kill him with a handgun he takes out. Joanie leaves and goes to EJ's apartment where she asks for advice. Joanie believes Ben is lying so she returns to Ben's with two police detectives the next day. Ben tells the detectives that Joanie is a patient of his and that she suffers from depression and PTSD. Ben shows the detectives the release form she signed and plays a recording where she threatened to kill him. Joanie denies all allegations, but the police side with Ben. After the police leave, Joanie tries to attack Ben, but he overpowers her.
50	8	"508"	Colin Bucksey	Story by : Kristina Woo & David Henry Hwang; Teleplay by : Kristina Woo & Sarah Treem	Helen & Noah	October 13, 2019	0.318
Helen gets hired at a high-end design firm. Child Protective Services is investigating Sierra after the car crash for child endangerment. Helen meets with Christianna, who tells Helen that her mother left her an inheritance of money, but Sasha is in charge of it and she wants Helen to talk with Sasha to terminate the trust. After a visit from CPS, Sierra tells Helen that she thinks she's an unfit mother and wonders if she should give up Eddie. Helen believes instead that she needs professional help. Sasha flies into town and surprises Helen for her birthday. Sierra mother's Adeline shows up at Helen's to take Sierra, and wants to put her in a psychiatric facility. Helen stands up for Sierra and believes she's suffering from postpartum depression, and has Sierra and Eddie stay with her. Noah meets with his publisher and the firm's public relations associate Joyce to discuss the allegations from Eden. Joyce advises Noah that they will handle the situation and for him not to contact Petra or Eden himself. Noah ignores the advice, and goes to see Petra where he admits off the record that he and Eden had "some flirtation, but it never went beyond that" and that it was consensual. Petra asks additional questions on-the-record, such as whether Noah ever pressured Eden into sex, which he denies. Petra then asks about another accusation from a former student, who claimed Noah was verbally and emotionally abusive. Noah meets with his lawyer Jon to discuss strategies. Jon suggests trying to discredit Eden or an under-the-table settlement; he also tells Noah not to contact Eden. Noah ignores Jon's advice and goes to the bookstore event where Eden is and confronts her. Noah goes to Helen's house to wish her a happy birthday and Helen receives a call from Petra.
51	9	"509"	Allison Anders	Katie Robbins	Helen & Whitney	October 20, 2019	0.374
Noah's expose in Vanity Fair comes out and the Solloway family is extremely affected by the news. Helen is fired from her high-end interior design firm before she even starts. Noah has been accused by six women who describe a pattern of behavior ranging from inappropriate comments to unwanted advances and emotional distress. Noah is offered a buyout from the Descent producers to change the title and remove his name from the film. A wildfire causes the Solloway family to evacuate the area, and Helen and the kids stay at Sasha's. Helen watches an Entertainment Tonight interview with Audrey Nelson, one of the accuser's and Noah's former student. Sasha writes a formal statement for Helen to release. Later that night, they watch Eden on Busy Tonight discuss Noah and she reveals she came forward because a reporter asked her about Noah. Helen figures out it was Sasha who put Petra onto Noah and accuses him of just wanting Noah off the film. Helen and the kids leave to look for Whitney. At JFK Airport, Whitney's flight to Los Angeles is canceled due to the wildfires. At the airport, she reads the Vanity Fair article and is bombarded with calls and texts, including from Colin, which she ignores. She accepts a call from Furkat and goes to his apartment. On the way to LA, Whitney is on the same flight as Audrey and confronts her. Audrey apologizes to Whitney for how the story is affecting her family, but that it's too important for it not to come out. Whitney returns home to Colin and admits she cheated on him with Furkat. Colin makes it clear how much he loves Whitney and finally shows her his painting, which is of her. Noah shows up at their apartment and tells Whitney there's no truth to the allegations. Helen then arrives and says it's all her fault because of Sasha and defends Noah. Whitney questions Helen why she is defending him because he cheated on her. Whitney then reveals a moment from several years ago at a party: "When you got in the hot tub, you didn't recognize me, but I saw the way you look at women — like they're prey." Whitney then runs into her bedroom as Helen questions Noah.
52	10	"510"	Toa Fraser	Story by : Sarah Treem & Itamar Moses; Teleplay by : Sarah Treem, Itamar Moses & Katie Robbins	Helen & Noah	October 27, 2019	0.442
Helen questions Noah and Whitney further about Whitney's revelation. Whitney tells her that she doesn't want to end up like her, and that Noah isn't invited to the wedding. Whitney needs her birth certificate in order to get a marriage license, so Helen leaves and goes to Noah's house to get it. Helen finds Noah passed out on the bed and she spends the night. In the morning, Helen questions Noah about the hot tub incident, and he describes it as the worst night of his life and he's been trying to make it up to her, including giving Whitney a perfect wedding. Helen tells him that he is no longer invited. A police officer arrives and notifies them that the wildfire is spreading and the city has issued a mandatory evacuation. Noah refuses to leave, telling Helen that she has the kids, but he just has photo albums and letters and he doesn't want them to burn. Noah accuses Helen of a co-dependency issue with him and she leaves. Noah goes through his belongings and listens to his and Alison's depositions to Detective Jeffries (from season 1). This sparks something in him and he decides to leave on foot. Noah eventually finds Helen and convinces her to abandon her vehicle because of the heavy traffic and escape on foot. Noah and Helen hike along a fireroad and are forced to climb down a small rock face to escape the oncoming wildfire. Noah and Helen begin to talk about their marriage and she asks him if they would still be together if they didn't go to Montauk and he didn't meet Alison. Noah tells Helen that he was the problem, not her. Noah asks Helen what the affair and divorce was like from her perspective, she tells him it was "awful", but "I made it through and I'm more proud of that than anything I've done in my life". While taking a break, Helen is bitten on the leg by a rattlesnake. With no cell service, Noah carries her until a police vehicle shows up and takes them to the hospital. Helen receives an anti-venom treatment and Noah sits by her side and greets her when she wakes up.
53	11	"511"	Sarah Treem	Sarah Treem	Noah, Joanie, Helen & Whitney	November 3, 2019	0.467
Noah respects Whitney's decision to not attend her wedding, but secretly continues to make arrangements, including choreographing the flash mob she requested. Helen questions Whitney's commitment to Colin, but supports her as the ceremony begins. She leaves the reception to find Noah, and after another soul-bearing conversation, they reunite. Whitney feels guilty about not inviting Noah to her wedding, and leaves with her siblings and Colin to find him. However, they can't knock on the door, as Whitney sees her parents making love through the window. In flashforwards, after leaving Ben's clinic Joanie stops at the Lobster Roll and encounters Noah as an elderly man. She fails to recognize Noah, but he learns that from her that Alison was murdered. EJ reveals that he is Eddie, Sierra and Vik's son, and Joanie is surprised to learn that Helen and Sierra remained friends despite Vik's affair. Learning Noah's identity, Joanie returns to the Lobster Roll and tells him the full story of her encounter with Ben. Noah tells her that her negative impression of Alison is inaccurate, and that she can complete the process of self-improvement her mother began. Joanie contentedly returns to her family, while the elderly Noah visits the graveyard and reads a fictionalized version of his story, written by Stacey, by Helen's gravestone. He then climbs to a clifftop and looks out over Montauk, dancing the flash mob routine from Whitney's wedding.

== Ratings ==
The Affair : U.S. viewers per episode (thousands)

Season	Episode number												Average
Season	1	2	3	4	5	6	7	8	9	10	11	12	Average
1	507	512	599	692	673	778	877	759	837	951	–		720
2	815	547	648	869	859	891	787	844	916	833	989	1111	840
3	600	579	662	666	724	480	654	612	793	725	–		649
4	477	457	559	470	538	483	544	507	595	564	–		519
5	464	417	405	379	382	430	372	318	374	442	467	–	405

Audience measurement performed by Nielsen Media Research
