= Dragon Storm (film) =

- Dragon Storm poster
- Also known as: Dragon Quest
- Written by: Patrick Phillips; Sam Wells
- Directed by: Stephen Furst
- Starring: Tony Amendola; John Rhys-Davies; Maxwell Caulfield; Angel Boris
- Music by: Richard McHugh
- Countries of origin: United States; Germany; Bulgaria
- Original language: English

Production
- Producers: Jeffery Beach; Michael Braun; Ken Olandt
- Cinematography: Lorenzo Senatore
- Editor: David Flores
- Running time: 96 minutes
- Production companies: Equity Pictures; Unified Film Organization
- Budget: $1,000,000

Original release
- Network: The Sci-Fi Channel
- Release: January 24, 2004

Dragon Storm is a 2004 made for TV fantasy action film written by Patrick Phillips and Sam Wells, and directed by Stephen Furst. At the time, it was Sci Fi Channel's most-watched original movie, with over 3 million viewers of the premiere broadcast.

== Plot ==
Meteorites falling from the sky during a meteor shower act as transportation for dragons traveling within. The dragons wreak havoc on the surrounding medieval countryside and two rival monarchs, King Fastrad (John Rhys-Davies) and King Wednesbury (John Hansson) must join forces to face the threat.

A messenger arrives to warn King Fastrad who does not believe him, until the dragons make their appearance and destroy his fiefdom. Fastrad and his top aids then head to the fiefdom of King Wednesbury, ostensibly to seek aid, but planning to overthrow him. Along the way they meet Silas (Maxwell Caulfield), a hunter who agrees, for a price, to escort and protect the party from the countryside's other dangers. They reach Wednesbury and Fastrad falsely accuses Silas of being a poacher in order to wiggle out of the debt. Silas is joined by the Mystic Scholar Ling (Woon Young Park), the vengeance-seeking Remmegar (Richard Wharton), and King Wednesbury's warrior daughter Medina (Angel Boris). One of the meteors was damaged when it fell, killing its dragon passenger. Ling studies the dead beast and the party decides to set off to hunt the remaining dragons using a giant ballista. While they are gone, Fastrad continues plotting against Wednesbury, and blackmails Wednesbury's aide to kill Silas.

== Cast ==
- Maxwell Caulfield as Silas
- Angel Boris as Medina
- Tony Amendola as Theldag
- John Rhys-Davies as King Fastrad
- Woon Young Park as Ling
- Richard Wharton as Remmegar
- Iskra Angelova as Nessa
- John Hansson as King Wednesbury
- Ivaylo Geraskov as Gelmaro
- Tyrone Pinkham as Ulfius

== Reception ==
Stephanie Star Smith of Box Office Prophets gave high marks to the special effects creating the dragons. She notes that in the past, "Sci-Fi Originals flicks have had some serious issues with CGI beasties", but approved of the realism of these creatures in this film. She found the acting to be "generally pretty good", and made special mention of the work in the film of John Rhys-Davies and Richard Wharton when opining that Maxwell Caulfield seemed to be an unfortunate casting decision. In summarizing the overall film, she offered "just over an hour-and-a-half, Dragon Storm doesn't wear out its welcome, and since the dragons appear from nearly the first scene, you don't have to wait ages for a look at the real stars of the film".

Dragon Storm was chosen by William Shatner as one of the selections in William Shatner's DVD Club.

German Monsters and Critics said that "some funny dialogue and neatly animated dragons pep it up" and that "the poor direction of the film is entertaining, and marks out that most of the budget went west for the effects."

Bargain Bin Review dubbed it "a cautionary tale about thoroughly reading contracts and scripts before signing up to a project."

John Rhys-Davies, who had previously played Gimli the Dwarf in Lord of the Rings, said in an interview that "You understand we're not comparing ... Dragon Storm with Lord of the Rings. Stephen directed this in god knows how many days – I think it was only like 21 days. It's a low-budget, rapidly made, and rather delightful little sci-fi squib."
