= The Affair (TV series) =

American television drama series (2014–2019)

- Television release poster
- Genre: Drama; Mystery; Psychological drama
- Created by: Sarah Treem; Hagai Levi
- Starring: Dominic West; Ruth Wilson; Maura Tierney; Joshua Jackson; Julia Goldani Telles; Jake Siciliano; Jadon Sand; Leya Catlett; Josh Stamberg; Catalina Sandino Moreno; Omar Metwally; Irène Jacob; Sanaa Lathan; Anna Paquin
- Opening theme: "Container" by Fiona Apple
- Composer: Marcelo Zarvos
- Country of origin: United States
- Original language: English
- No. of seasons: 5
- No. of episodes: 53 (list of episodes)

Production
- Executive producers: Sarah Treem; Hagai Levi; Jeffrey Reiner; Eric Overmyer; Anya Epstein
- Production locations: Brooklyn, New York City; Long Island City, New York City; Westchester County, New York; Rockland County, New York; Montauk, New York; Los Angeles, California
- Cinematography: Steven Fierberg; Tod Campbell
- Editors: Louis Cioffi; Todd Desrosiers; Dana Congdon; Agnes Grandits; Pete Beaudreau
- Camera setup: Single-camera
- Running time: 50–90 minutes
- Production companies: Sheleg; Higlewater; Showtime Networks

Original release
- Network: Showtime
- Release: October 12, 2014 – November 3, 2019

Related
- Saklı

The Affair is an American drama television series created by Sarah Treem and Hagai Levi. The series premiered on Showtime on October 12, 2014. It ran for five seasons, concluding with its final episode on November 3, 2019.

The series primarily stars Dominic West, Ruth Wilson, Maura Tierney, and Joshua Jackson, and it explores the emotional effects of extramarital relationships. Episodes are often separated into two parts, with each half being told from the point of view of a specific character. The use of this dramatic device has been used by Treem to describe The Affair as "the Rashomon of relationship dramas".

The series won the Golden Globe Award for Best Television Series – Drama and Wilson won for Best Actress – Television Series Drama at the 72nd Golden Globe Awards in 2015. At the 73rd Golden Globe Awards in 2016, Maura Tierney won the award for Best Supporting Actress.

== Series overview ==
The Affair explores the emotional effects of an extramarital relationship between Noah Solloway and Alison Bailey after they casually meet at the diner where Alison works. The series begins with the Solloway family traveling to the resort town of Montauk, New York. Noah is happily married to Helen with four children (Whitney, Martin, Trevor, and Stacey), but he resents their dependence on his wealthy father-in-law. Alison is a local waitress trying to piece her life and marriage to Cole back together after the death of their four-year-old son. The story of the affair is depicted from Noah's and Alison's perspectives respectively, complete with memory bias which often results in vastly different scenarios. Each episode has two parts, one as remembered by Noah, the other by Alison.

In the second season, the narrative is expanded to include the perspectives of Noah and Alison's original spouses, Helen and Cole, as they all move forward with the dissolution of their marriages and deal with the ramifications. The subsequent death of Alison's brother-in-law, Scott, and the ensuing police investigation and criminal trial, are explored in flashforward scenes at the end of most episodes. Alison gives birth to her second child, Joanie.

The third season is set three years later, following the culmination of the flashforward trial scenes, after Noah is released from prison. Season 3 introduces an occasional perspective, Juliette Le Gall, a professor and Noah's love interest.

In the fourth season, Noah has moved to Los Angeles to be closer to his younger children Trevor and Stacey, as Helen and Vik have moved there. Noah is also an English teacher at a charter school where he gets romantically involved with its principal, Janelle Wilson. Cole and Luisa are living together in Montauk, while Alison is working as a grief counselor. Season 4 features opening flashforward sequences, featuring Noah and Cole, in its first four episodes, which ultimately lead to the discovery of Alison's death. The central perspectives of Noah, Helen, Alison and Cole continue, with the latter two reaching their conclusions; a one-off part from Vik's perspective is also featured.

The fifth and final season takes place in two different time frames: a present-day storyline including Noah, Helen, and their four children and the other decades later featuring a now-adult Joanie Lockhart returning to Montauk and discovering the truth about her mother's death. The season introduces the perspectives of Joanie and Whitney alongside Noah and Helen, as well as one-off parts from the perspectives of Janelle and Sierra.

=== Perspective characters ===
Key
Yes	Perspective featured
Maybe	Non-perspective appearance
No	Does not appear

Character	Season				
Character	1	2	3	4	5
Noah	Yes	Yes	Yes	Yes	Yes
Alison	Yes	Yes	Yes	Yes	No
Helen	Maybe	Yes	Yes	Yes	Yes
Cole	Maybe	Yes	Yes	Yes	No
Whitney	Maybe	Maybe	Maybe	Maybe	Yes
Vik	No	Maybe	Maybe	Yes	Maybe
Juliette	No	No	Yes	No	No
Janelle	No	No	No	Maybe	Yes
Sierra	No	No	No	Maybe	Yes
Joanie	No	No	No	No	Yes

== Episodes ==
Season	Episodes	Originally released	
Season	Episodes	First released	Last released
1	10	October 12, 2014	December 21, 2014
2	12	October 4, 2015	December 20, 2015
3	10	November 20, 2016	January 29, 2017
4	10	June 17, 2018	August 19, 2018
5	11	August 25, 2019	November 3, 2019

== Cast ==
=== Main cast ===
Character	Actor	Season				
Character	Actor	1	2	3	4	5
Noah Solloway	Dominic West	Main	Main	Main	Main	Main
Alison Bailey	Ruth Wilson	Main (Note: Also appears in season 5 through archive footage.)	Main	Main	Main	
Helen Butler	Maura Tierney	Main	Main	Main	Main	Main
Cole Lockhart	Joshua Jackson	Main	Main	Main	Main	
Whitney Solloway	Julia Goldani Telles	Main	Main	Main	Main	Main
Martin Solloway	Jake Siciliano	Main	Main	Main	Guest	Recurring
Trevor Solloway	Jadon Sand	Main	Main	Main	Main	Main
Stacey Solloway	Leya Catlett	Main	Main			
Stacey Solloway	Abigail Dylan Harrison			Recurring	Recurring	Recurring
Max Cadman	Josh Stamberg	Recurring	Main	Guest		
Luisa León	Catalina Sandino Moreno		Recurring	Main	Main	Recurring
Vik Ullah	Omar Metwally		Recurring	Main (Note: Until season 5 episode 2.)	Main	Main
Juliette Le Gall	Irène Jacob			Main		
Janelle Wilson	Sanaa Lathan				Main (Note: Until season 5 episode 3.)	Main
Joanie Lockhart	Uncredited		Guest			
Joanie Lockhart	Stella Tapis			Guest		
Joanie Lockhart	Reagan and Savannah Grella			Recurring	Recurring	
Joanie Lockhart	Anna Paquin					Main

=== Recurring cast ===
- Victor Williams as Detective Jeffries (seasons 1–2, 4)
- John Doman as Bruce Butler, Helen's father (seasons 1–3, 5)
- Kathleen Chalfant as Margaret Butler, Helen's mother (seasons 1–3, 5)
- Mare Winningham as Cherry Lockhart, Cole's mother (seasons 1–2, 4)
- Colin Donnell as Scott Lockhart, Cole's brother (seasons 1–2)
- Danny Fischer as Hal Lockhart, Cole's brother (seasons 1–2, guest seasons 3–4)
- Michael Godere as Caleb Lockhart, Cole's brother (seasons 1–2, guest seasons 3–4)
- Kaija Matiss as Mary-Kate Lockhart, Hal's wife (seasons 1–2, guest seasons 3–4)
- Deirdre O'Connell as Athena Bailey, Alison's mother (seasons 1–2, 4)
- Darren Goldstein as Oscar Hodges, owner of The Lobster Roll (seasons 1–3, guest season 4)
- Nicolette Robinson as Jane, waitress at The Lobster Roll (seasons 1–2, guest season 4)
- Stephen Kunken as Harry, Noah's publisher (seasons 1–2, guest season 5)
- Lynn Cohen as Joan Bailey, Alison's grandmother (season 1)
- Jennifer Esposito as Nina Solloway, Noah's sister (seasons 2–3)
- Richard Schiff as Jon Gottlief, Noah's attorney (season 2, guest season 5)
- Joanna Gleason as Yvonne, a publisher who, along with her husband Robert, owns the guest house in which Alison and Noah stay (season 2)
- Peter Friedman as Robert, Yvonne's husband (season 2)
- Brooke Lyons as Eden Ellery, Noah's publicist during his book tour (seasons 2, 5)
- Brendan Fraser as John Gunther, a prison guard (season 3)
- Danny Mastrogiorgio as Detective Stanton (season 3)
- René Ifrah as Detective Romero (season 3)
- Sarah Ramos as Audrey, a student of Noah and Juliette (season 3, guest season 5)
- Jonathan Cake as Furkat, an aged photographer, Whitney's love interest (seasons 3, 5)
- Christopher Meyer as Anton Gatewood, an intelligent student at the school where Noah teaches (season 4, guest season 5)
- Russell Hornsby as Carl Gatewood, Janelle's ex-husband and Anton's father (seasons 4–5)
- Emily Browning as Sierra James, Helen and Vik's neighbor (seasons 4–5)
- Ramon Rodriguez as Ben Cruz, a Marine veteran and Alison's love interest (season 4) (Note: Tony Plana plays an older Ben Cruz in one episode of season 5.)
- Zenobia Shroff as Priya Ullah, Vik's mother (seasons 4–5)
- Zuhair Haddad as Abdul Ullah, Vik's father (seasons 4–5)
- Adam Shapiro as Joel, a teacher and later principal at the school where Noah teaches (seasons 4–5)
- Claes Bang as Sasha Mann, an A-list movie star and Helen's love interest (season 5)
- Max Fowler as Colin, Whitney's fiancé (season 5, guest season 4)
- Lyriq Bent as Paul, a sports agent and Joanie's husband (season 5)
- Mozhan Marnò as Petra, a Vanity Fair journalist who interviews Noah for her magazine feature (season 5)
- Jennifer Jason Leigh as Adeline Taylor, Sierra's mother (season 5)
- Dana Drori as Christianna, the daughter of Sasha's deceased fiancée (season 5)
- Michael Braun as EJ, an epigenetics scientist who helps Joanie (season 5)
- Jaidyn Triplett as Thea (season 5)

== Production ==
On February 8, 2013, it was announced that Showtime had ordered a pilot for The Affair. The network officially picked up the series on January 16, 2014, with a 10-episode order. On November 10, 2014, Showtime renewed the series for a 10-episode second season; however, it was later changed to 12. On December 9, 2015, the series was renewed for a third season. On January 9, 2017, Showtime renewed the series for a fourth season. On July 26, 2018, Showtime announced it had renewed the series for a fifth and final season.

Ruth Wilson requested to leave ahead of season four. Although Wilson did not fully disclose the reason for her departure in 2019, The Hollywood Reporter did an exposé alleging that Wilson had been uncomfortable with the amount of nudity required for the role and naming showrunner Sarah Treem and executive producer and director Jeffrey Reiner as behaving inappropriately towards actors on set. Treem would later deny the accusations that she had coerced Wilson into nude scenes while admitting that Wilson was not comfortable with the amount of nudity required for the character and that body doubles were frequently used. Treem also corroborated that there had been an investigation into Reiner after he allegedly shared nude photos of a body double with producer, writer and actress Lena Dunham despite the fact that she was not involved in the show in any capacity.

After the conclusion of the fourth season and prior to the start of production on the fifth and final season, several series regulars departed the series. Joshua Jackson did not return for the final season. Omar Metwally and Sanaa Lathan appear until episodes 2 and 3 respectively, and are removed from the main cast thereafter. Catalina Sandino Moreno appears in episodes six and seven as a guest star, in both the present-day and flashforward storylines.

== Reception ==
=== Critical response ===
Critical response of The Affair
Season	Rotten Tomatoes	Metacritic
1	90% (130 reviews)	85 (28 reviews)
2	90% (126 reviews)	78 (15 reviews)
3	71% (21 reviews)	72 (8 reviews)
4	91% (23 reviews)	—N/a
5	88% (16 reviews)	77 (4 reviews)

The first season received praise from critics. On the review aggregator Rotten Tomatoes, the season has a rating of 90%, based on 130 reviews, with an average rating of 8.15/10. The consensus reads: "Thanks to some smart, creative storytelling and spectacular performances, The Affair is a somber, bewitching exploration of truth and desire." On Metacritic, the first season has a score of 85 out of 100, based on 28 reviews, indicating "universal acclaim".

The second season received continued positive reviews from critics. On Rotten Tomatoes, the season has a rating of 90%, based on 126 reviews, with an average rating of 8/10. The consensus reads: "The Affair shifts its emphasis in season two, moving psychological drama to the foreground and expanding the show's central crime story to include two new points of view." On Metacritic, it has a score of 78 out of 100 based on 15 reviews, indicating "generally favorable reviews". Gwen Ihnat of The A.V. Club gave it an "A−" grade and wrote that "With its bold new move to double our number of perspectives, it appears that The Affair will sail over that sophomore slump that has felled so many other Showtime dramas.

The third season received positive reviews from critics, although less acclaim than the first two seasons. On Rotten Tomatoes, the season has a rating of 71%, based on 21 reviews, with an average rating of 7.7/10. The consensus reads: "The Affair adds to its cast of strong characters and deepens the mood, tension, and intrigue, even if the plot sometimes struggles to move forward." On Metacritic, it has a score of 72 out of 100 based on 8 reviews, indicating "generally favorable reviews".

The fourth season received continued positive reviews from critics. On Rotten Tomatoes, the season has a rating of 91%, based on 23 reviews, with an average rating of 7.4/10. The consensus reads: "The Affair's captivating character study returns with fewer kinks than its previous outing, resulting in a more emotionally grounded season that regains much of the show's initial allure."

The fifth season received continued positive reviews from critics. On Rotten Tomatoes, the season has a rating of 88%, based on 16 reviews, with an average rating of 6.6/10. The consensus reads: "As addicting and outlandish as ever, season five proves the perfect farewell for The Affair." On Metacritic, it has a score of 77 out of 100 based on 4 reviews, indicating "generally favorable reviews".

=== Awards and nominations ===
Association	Category	Nominee(s)	Result
72nd Golden Globe Awards	Best Actor – Television Series Drama	Dominic West	Nominated
72nd Golden Globe Awards	Best Actress – Television Series Drama	Ruth Wilson	Won
72nd Golden Globe Awards	Best Television Series – Drama	The Affair	Won
19th Satellite Awards	Best Actress – Television Series Drama	Ruth Wilson	Nominated
19th Satellite Awards	Best Television Series – Drama	The Affair	Nominated
67th Writers Guild of America Awards	Best New Series	The Affair	Nominated
6th Critics' Choice Television Awards	Best Supporting Actress in a Drama Series	Maura Tierney	Nominated
73rd Golden Globe Awards	Best Supporting Actress – Series, Miniseries or Television Film	Maura Tierney	Won
42nd People's Choice Awards	Favorite Premium Cable TV Actor	Joshua Jackson	Nominated
20th Satellite Awards	Best Actor – Television Series Drama	Dominic West	Won
68th Primetime Emmy Awards	Outstanding Supporting Actress in a Drama Series	Maura Tierney	Nominated
7th Critics' Choice Television Awards	Best Supporting Actress in a Drama Series	Maura Tierney	Nominated
21st Satellite Awards	Best Television Series – Drama	The Affair	Nominated
21st Satellite Awards	Best Actor – Television Series Drama	Dominic West	Won
21st Satellite Awards	Best Actress – Television Series Drama	Ruth Wilson	Nominated
21st Satellite Awards	Best Supporting Actress – Series, Miniseries or Television Film	Maura Tierney	Nominated
Location Managers Guild Awards	Outstanding Locations in a Contemporary TV Series	Sean Ilnseher	Nominated
22nd Satellite Awards	Best Television Series – Drama	The Affair	Nominated
22nd Satellite Awards	Best Actress – Television Series Drama	Ruth Wilson	Nominated
71st Writers Guild of America Awards	Television: Episodic Drama	Lydia Diamond, Sarah Sutherland and Jaquén Castellanos for "Episode 407"	Nominated

== Home media ==
The first season was released on DVD in region 1 on August 4, 2015. The set contains all 10 episodes, plus special features, including character profiles and costume featurettes. The second season was released on DVD in region 1 on August 16, 2016. The third season was released on DVD in region 1 on April 25, 2017. The fourth season was released on DVD in region 1 on October 16, 2018. The fifth and final season as well as a complete series collection were released on DVD in region 1 on March 10, 2020.

== International broadcast ==
In Canada, the series premiered simultaneously with the American broadcast on October 12, 2014, and aired on Movie Central and The Movie Network. The series premiered on Showcase in Australia on February 10, 2015. Sky Atlantic bought the rights to air The Affair in the UK with season one beginning in May 2015.

== International version ==
A Turkish adaptation of the series, titled Saklı, premiered on November 23, 2021, on BluTV.
