= Sarah Treem =

American playwright and television writer

- Born: Boston, Massachusetts, U.S.
- Education: Yale University (BA, MFA)
- Occupations: Writer-producer; Playwright
- Years active: 2010–present
- Known for: In Treatment; The Affair
- Spouse: Torfi Frans Ólafsson
- Children: 2

Sarah Treem is an American TV writer-producer and playwright. She is the co-creator and showrunner of the Showtime drama The Affair, which won the Golden Globe Award for Outstanding Drama Series, and was a writer and co-executive producer on the inaugural season of House of Cards, which was nominated for nine Golden Globes, including Outstanding Drama Series. She also wrote on all three seasons of the HBO series In Treatment.

== Early life ==
Treem was born in Boston, Massachusetts, to a mother who works as a consultant/angel investor and advisor to start-ups and to a father who is a pediatric gastroenterologist. She grew up in New Hampshire, Philadelphia, Washington, D.C., Connecticut, and North Carolina with her parents and brother. Treem considers New Haven to be her home town.

Treem has been writing from a very young age, beginning with poetry when she was eight years old. When she was twelve, Treem's first play won a young playwright contest and was staged in Connecticut. She continued to write throughout high school and college.

Treem graduated high school from Durham Academy in Durham, North Carolina in 1998. She obtained a Bachelor of Arts from Yale University in 2002, where she was in the residential college Branford College, and a 2005 M.F.A. from Yale School of Drama. During college, Treem interned at New Dramatists.

== Career ==
Having started her career in theater, Treem's most recent stage production When We Were Young and Unafraid premiered in the summer of 2014, which starred Cherry Jones and was directed by Pam MacKinnon. A Feminine Ending premiered at Playwrights Horizons and went on to be produced at South Coast Repertory and Portland Center Stage, among others. The How and The Why premiered at the McCarter Theater in Princeton, New Jersey. It was directed by Emily Mann and starred Mercedes Ruehl. It also went on to productions at Interact Theatre and Trinity Repertory. Treem's other plays include Empty Sky (Bloomington Playwrights Project), Orphan Island (Sundance Theater Lab), Human Voices (New York Stage and Film), and Mirror Mirror.

Treem's work in television began on the acclaimed HBO series In Treatment. She then moved on to writing and co-executive producing the political drama House of Cards. In 2014, Treem co-created the hit Showtime series The Affair. Set in Montauk, New York, the show examines the psychological effects of an affair between a married waitress and a teacher who spends his summer at his in-laws' estate in the small coastal town. The series tells the same story from multiple perspectives and won the Golden Globe for Outstanding Drama Series in 2015. Treem said that "the concept is that two people can be in the same conversation and have radically different experiences." In addition to her Golden Globe win, Treem's work has earned her nominations for the Humanitas Prize, Primetime Emmy Awards and four Writers Guild of America Awards, including two wins for New Series for House of Cards and In Treatment. In December 2019, a Hollywood Reporter article reported that Treem had been accused of inappropriately pressuring actors to do nude scenes on The Affair. Treem denied the claims in Deadline shortly after.

In November 2019, Treem signed a multi-year deal with Fox 21 television studios to create and produce series for their network, cable and streaming platforms. Her upcoming television shows include Cry Wolf for FX, based on the Danish series Ulven kommer, and Lovesick for Netflix, based on the Israeli series Choley Ahava.

== Personal life ==
Treem wrote an essay about the reality of "having it all" as a working mother for Red Magazine in 2017, in a post that eventually went viral.

Treem married Jay Carson in 2014 and divorced in 2017 after three years of marriage. In October 2022, Treem married Icelandic game designer Torfi Frans Ólafsson.

=== Teaching ===
She also teaches on Series Mania Writers' Campus, with fellow television writer Martie Cook, a week-long intensive on television drama. She has previously taught at Yale College.

=== Writing style ===
All of Treem's plays and film work have high percentages of female roles. Treem has forged ongoing creative relationships with actresses like Zoe Kazan (who knew each other from Yale) and Alison Pill.

== Filmography ==
- 2008–10: In Treatment (HBO) – co-producer; supervising producer; writer
- 2010: How to Make It in America (HBO) – producer; writer
- 2013: House of Cards (Netflix) – co-executive producer; writer
- 2014–19: The Affair (Showtime) – creator; executive producer; writer; director

== Awards ==
- 2008: Nominated for Humanitas Prize, 30 Minute Category, for In Treatment episode "Sophie Week 2."
- 2009: Won Writers Guild of America Award, New Series, for In Treatment
- 2013: Nominated for Primetime Emmy, Outstanding Drama Series, for House of Cards
- 2014: Won Writers Guild of America Award, New Series, for House of Cards - with Kate Barnow, Rick Cleveland, Sam Forman, Gina Gionfriddo, Keith Huff, Beau Willimon
- 2014: Won Golden Globe Award, Best TV Series, Drama, for The Affair
- 2016: Nominated for Humanitas Prize, 60 Minute Category, for The Affair "Pilot." - with Hagai Levi.

== Works or publications ==
=== Plays ===
- Treem, Sarah. A Feminine Ending. New York, NY: Samuel French, 2008. ISBN 978-0-573-65235-6
- Treem, Sarah. Against The Wall.
- Treem, Sarah. Empty Sky.
- Treem, Sarah. Human Voices.
- Treem, Sarah. Mirror, Mirror. New York, NY: Samuel French, 2010. ISBN 978-0-573-69826-2
- Treem, Sarah. Orphan Island.
- Treem, Sarah. The How and the Why. New York, NY: Dramatists Play Service, 2013. ISBN 978-0-822-22731-1
- Treem, Sarah. When We Were Young and Unafraid.
