= Guri Alfi =

Israeli director, actor and comedian

Guri Alfi-Aharon
- גורי אלפי-אהרון
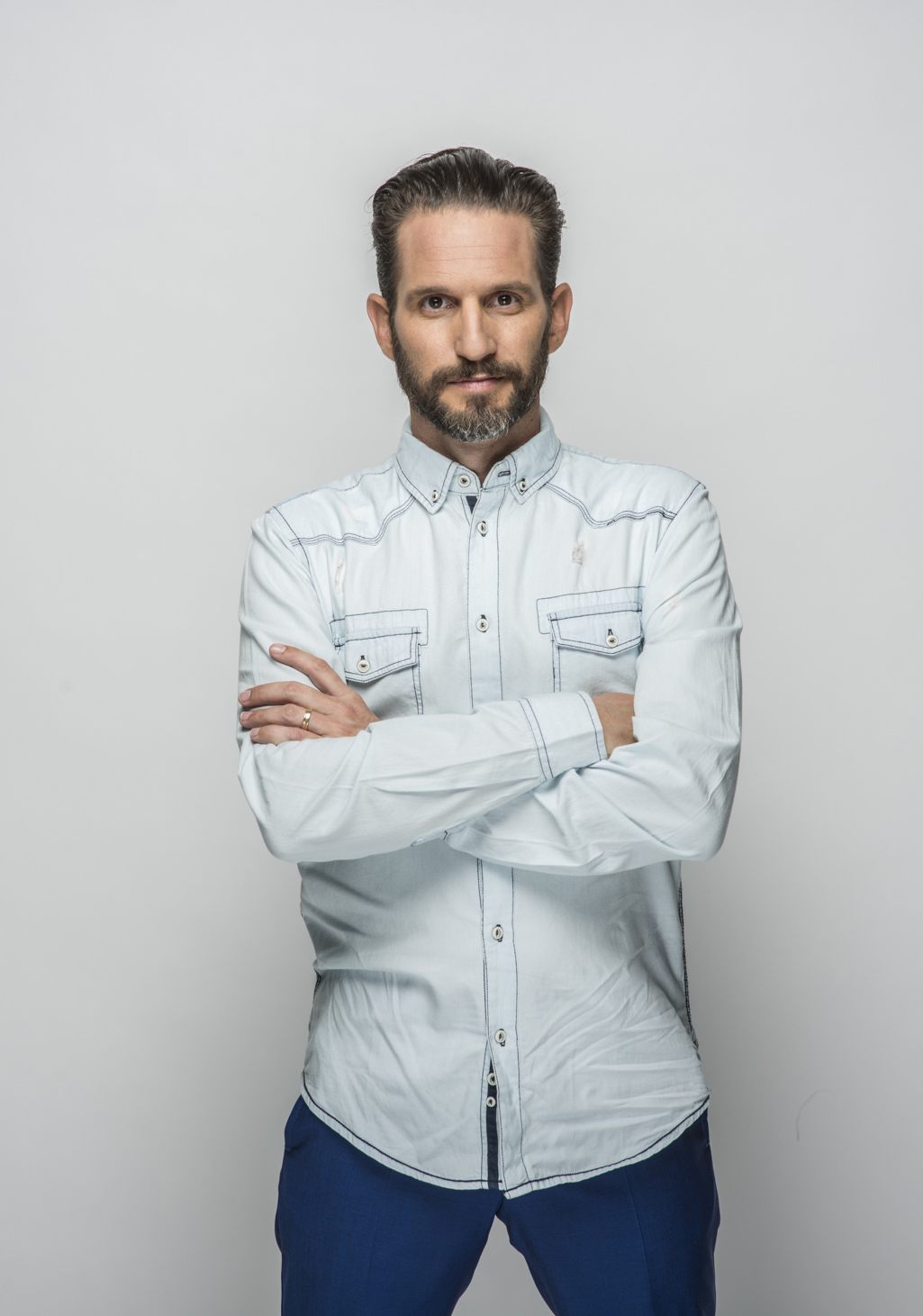
- Born: September 18, 1976 (age 49); Ramat Gan, Israel
- Occupations: Actor, director, screenwriter, producer, stand-up comedian, voice actor, television host
- Years active: 1994–present
- Notable work: Domino, The Assi and Guri Show, Mishak Makhur, The State of the Nation
- Spouse: Hila Aharon
- Children: 4, including Emma Alfi
- Relatives: Yosi Alfi (father); Sherry Alfi (sister)

Guri Alfi-Aharon (Hebrew: גורי אלפי-אהרון; born 18 September 1976) is an Israeli actor, director, screenwriter, producer, stand-up comedian, voice actor, comedian and television host.

== Biography ==
Alfi was born, raised and educated in Ramat Gan. He is the son of the writer Yosi Alfi who immigrated to Israel from Iraq, and Sue Alfi (née Platt) who immigrated from the United Kingdom and volunteered in a kibbutz. His sister is the actress Sherry Alfi.

He studied at the Arnon elementary school in his hometown and at the Blich High School's drama department. At age 16 he began performing at the Domino Gross stand-up club. He did his military service in the IDF Education Corps ensemble, alongside Yael Poliakov and Noa Tishby.

== Career ==
In 1994 he was a partner in creating the comedy TV show Platfoos and participated in its first season. In 1998 he co-founded the band Funkinstein with Elran Dekel, and at that time he also began appearing on Educational TV alongside Rotem Abuhav in the children's game show Calculated Risk hosted by Hanan Liderman.

In 1999, he appeared on the humor TV show Domino, alongside comedians Rotem Abuhav, Assi Cohen, Adir Miller, Tali Orr, Shagit Sol and Roy Bar-Natan. Alfi and Cohen began performing as a comic duo in the stand-up show The Assi and Guri Show. In 2000 the two appeared in a humorous segment on the entertainment show Only in Israel, and received the Entertainment Persons of the Year award. Due to his TV success, Alfi left the Funkinstein band that year.

In 2002, he played his first dramatic role in the series 101 by Hagai Levi. That year, he also created, wrote and starred in the comedy series Broadcasts of the Revolution, alongside Assi Cohen.

In 2003, he edited the entertainment show The Main Show, featuring Rotem Abuhav and the Prozac Trio. That year Assi and Guri announced the end of their joint show and the breakup of the duo.

In 2004, he began appearing on the satirical entertainment show Mishak Makhur alongside Einav Galili and Lior Shlain.

In 2005, he starred in the comedy film Ricky Ricky alongside Tal Friedman, played a lead role in the HOT3 drama series In the Sign of Venus alongside Yehuda Levi, began hosting the radio show Black Business on Galei Zahal, and appeared in the solo docu-comic series That’s Not How You Behave which aired on Channel 2 (Reshet) which Alfi also helped create.

In 2006, he played in the opening film of the 11th International Student Film Festival, the short film G.G. Islamond’s Story, alongside Sharon Alexander, Guy Shami, Lior Miller, Lucy Dubinchik and Gila Almagor. Towards the end of that year he began starring alongside Danny Geva and Eli Finish in the series I Didn’t Promise You which aired on Yes.

In 2007, he appeared in Avi Nesher’s film The Secrets and in the TV series Custody by Irit Linor on Keshet's Channel 2 broadcasts. That year he also hosted the AMI Awards ceremony on Channel 24 twice in a row.

From January 2008, he hosted the docu-comic series Laugh or Die, which he also created and developed, exploring humor, and hosted the game show The Truth Results. Both shows aired for one season on Channel 2, as part of the Reshet franchise. That year he also created along with Shahar Segal and Roi Bar Natan the comedy show Schultz which aired on Yes.

In July–September 2008, he hosted the light midday show Ejection Program on Galei Zahal. The show was co-hosted by Liyad Modrik, who edited Laugh or Die. In Spring 2009, Alfi and Einav Galili hosted the humorous midday show Warm Relationship on Galei Zahal. Warm Relationship returned to Galei Zahal for an additional season in June 2010, for the summer months, and once again in February 2012.

In 2009, on the 30th anniversary of the band Gazozs breakup, Alfi put on a tribute show to the band alongside Roy Bar Natan and Tali Orr, and the three performed with it for several years, including during a performance tour in the summer of 2011 called In Honor of Summer which also featured the band's founder, Danny Sanderson. In 2009 he played in the series What a Bachelor Needs which aired on Hot 3.

He wrote a humor column alongside Einav Galili in Israel Sheshavta, the weekend supplement of the Israel Hayom newspaper from when it was first published in November 2009 until February 2013.

Alfi voiced Runt the pig in Chicken Little, Rami the mouse in Ratatouille, Beyonce in the internet comedy film Movie Zero and himself in Celeb’s. He served as narrator in the first season of The Link which dealt with internet culture on Channel 8 (2010) and in its second season in 2014 (as The Link+) on Educational TV.

In 2010, he began regularly participating in the satire show Gav Ha'Uma on the Reshet franchise on Channel 2, alongside Lior Schleien, Orna Banai and Einav Galili. Alfi participated in the show for 8 seasons that aired on Channel 2 as well as the first season in 2015 that aired on Channel 10 under the name Nation’s Back.

In 2010, he directed the documentary film It’s the Same Love for the DVD release of the film Cables, in which he brought together for a joint interview the film's stars and creators Arik Einstein, Moni Moshonov and Tzvi Shissel. The documentary was included as a DVD bonus feature and also aired as part of Keshet's Channel 2 broadcasts.

That October, the film The Human Resources Manager was released, in which Alfi played his first dramatic film role. The film won Best Film at the Ophir Award and Alfi was nominated for Best Supporting Actor for his role.

In 2015, Alfi launched his own late night show, HaYom BaLaila (The Day at Night). In 2019, he co-starred in Echo, a suspenseful drama about infidelity.

In 2020, Alfi starred in the Israeli TV series that was later sold to Netflix, Black Space. Alfi plays the police officer Rami Davidi. Alfi returned to his role as Davidi for the show's second season which aired in 2024.

In 2021, Alfi hosted a docuseries called The New Jew about understanding the attitudes of American Jews. He interviewed Angela Buchdahl, Bari Weiss, Tehran Von Ghasri, Rachel Freier, Jews of color, and Jews by choice. Also in 2021, he played a slick, arrogant matchmaker in the series Shababnikim, which was described as "Entourage with black hats".

Alfi's 2025 docuseries The New Jew: Days of War features interviews with hostage families, activists, and students in the United States in the aftermath of the October 7 attacks. Most interviews are in English, including with Shabbos Kestenbaum and the parents of Omer Neutra and Rose Lubin.

== Personal life ==
Alfi is married to Hila Aharon (whose family name he added to his own) and is a father of four daughters, the oldest of whom is the actress Emma Alfi.

Since the birth of his eldest daughter in 2003, Alfi has declined professional work on Shabbat and reserved the day for his family, although he has said that he does not observe all Shabbat restrictions.
