= Mishak Makhur =

- Created by: Maagalot Productions, Lior Schlein and Avi Cohen
- Starring: Einav Galili (host); Lior Schleien (Team Captain); Guri Alfi (Team Captain); Guest hosts
- No. of episodes: 54

Production
- Producer: Ma'agalot Productions
- Running time: 50 minutes

Original release
- Network: Reshet (2004–2006) for Channel 2
- Release: August 2004 – July 2006

Related
- Eretz Nehederet

Mishak Makhur (Hebrew: משחק מכור, lit. Sold Game or Fixed Game) is an Israeli TV current affairs show that was broadcast on Channel 2 between 2004 and 2006. It was produced for Reshet by Ma'agalot Productions. During 2008, rumors about possible return to the screen were heard.

The show was the first comedy panel show in the Israeli TV. The original line-up, in 2004, included Einav Galili as chairman, with Lior Schleien, the creator of the show, comedians Guri Alfi and Reshef Levi, and Gil Riva, a flamboyant journalist. In the second season, Reshef and Gil left the show while Lior and Guri remained as team captains accompanied by a guest host, often a politician, journalist or comedian.

The show had two spin offs:

- "Grill" a local version of Roast
- "Security Zone" ("Retsuat HaBitahon"), a special daily show during the 2006 Lebanon War.
