= Gav Ha'Uma =

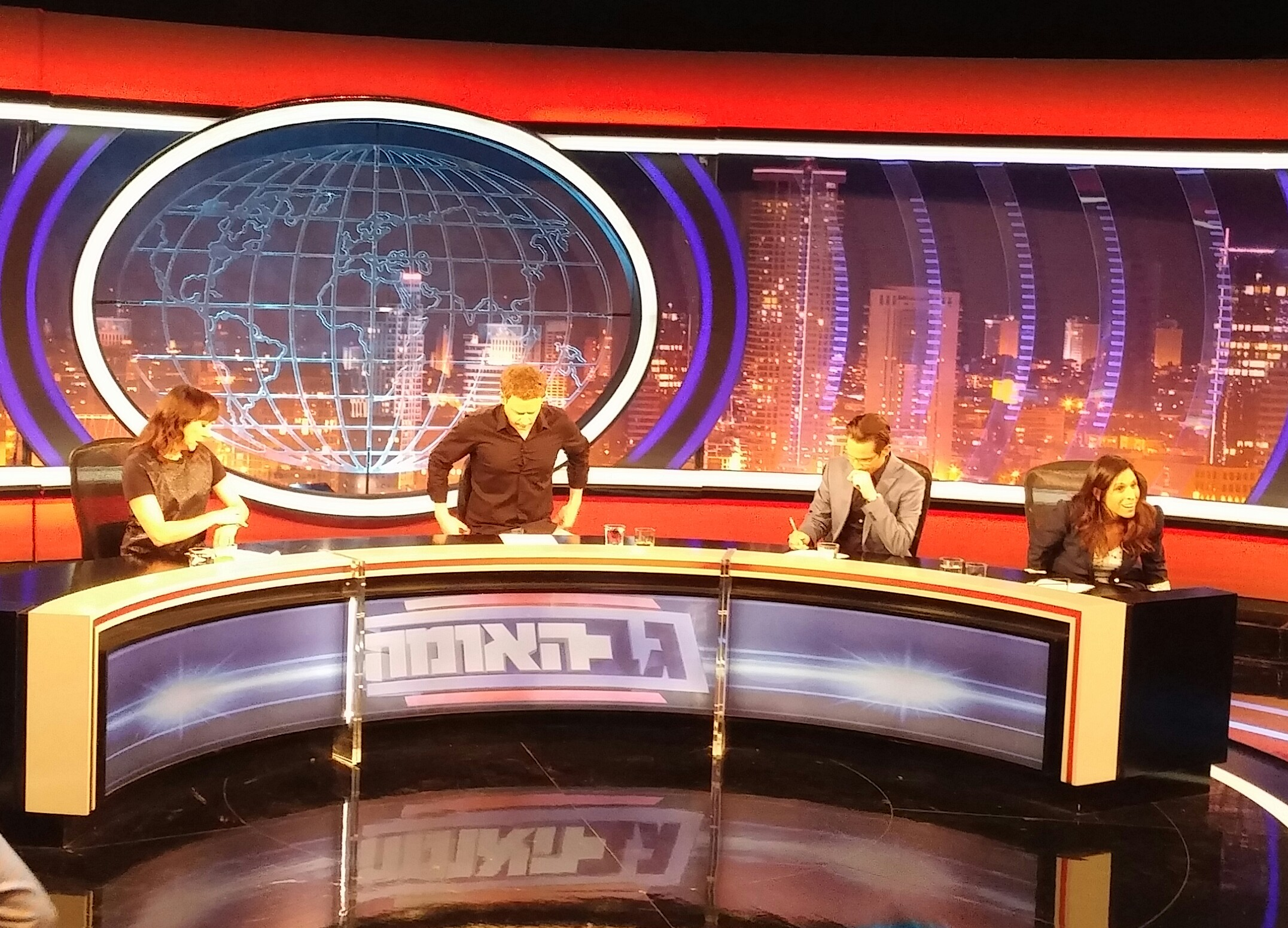
- Also known as: Matzav Ha'Uma
- גב האומה
- Created by: Lior Schleien and Avi Cohen
- Directed by: Sivan Magazanik
- Starring: Lior Schleien (host); Einav Galili (Team Captain); Guri Alfi (Team Captain) (2010–2015); Orna Banai (Team Captain); Guest hosts
- No. of series: 8 (Matzav Ha'Uma); 4 (Gav Ha'Uma)
- No. of episodes: 151 ("Matzav Ha'Uma"); 122 ("Gav Ha'Uma)

Production
- Producers: Haim Manor, Roni Manor
- Editors: Avi Cohen, Lior Schleien

Original release
- Network: Reshet for Channel 2 (2010–2015); Channel 10 (2015–2019); Reshet 13 (2019–2020)
- Release: January 4, 2010 – March 15, 2020

Gav Ha'Uma (formerly Matzav Ha'Uma) was an Israeli satire show hosted by Lior Schleien, Orna Banai, Guri Alfi and as of the fourth season also Einav Galili. The show was broadcast from January 4, 2010 until January 15, 2015 on Channel 2 (Reshet) as Matzav Ha'Uma ("מצב האומה", "The state of the nation") and from February 3, 2015 on Channel 10 as Gav Ha'Uma ("גב האומה", "The back of the nation").

== History ==
Guri Alfi, one of the show's regular panelists, appeared in only a handful of episodes of the 2nd season of Gav Ha'Uma, and departed from the show in favor of hosting his own late-night talk show in Channel 2's Keshet. Recurring panelists participate since then as a replacement.

The show's team performed in NY at NYU Skirball Center in 2014, with a guest skit involving Joan Rivers.

The show was taken down in August 2020, after the network decided not to sign Lior Schleien for another season, this due to high production cost, and low ratings.

The shows cancellation sparked controversy. Some claimed that the shows cancellation was influenced by political interest, while other suggested that the show stopped being funny.

== See also ==
- Channel 2 (Israel)
- Channel 10 (Israel)
- Reshet
- Nana 10
