= Na'an =

Kibbutz in central Israel

Na'an: נַעַן (Hebrew)
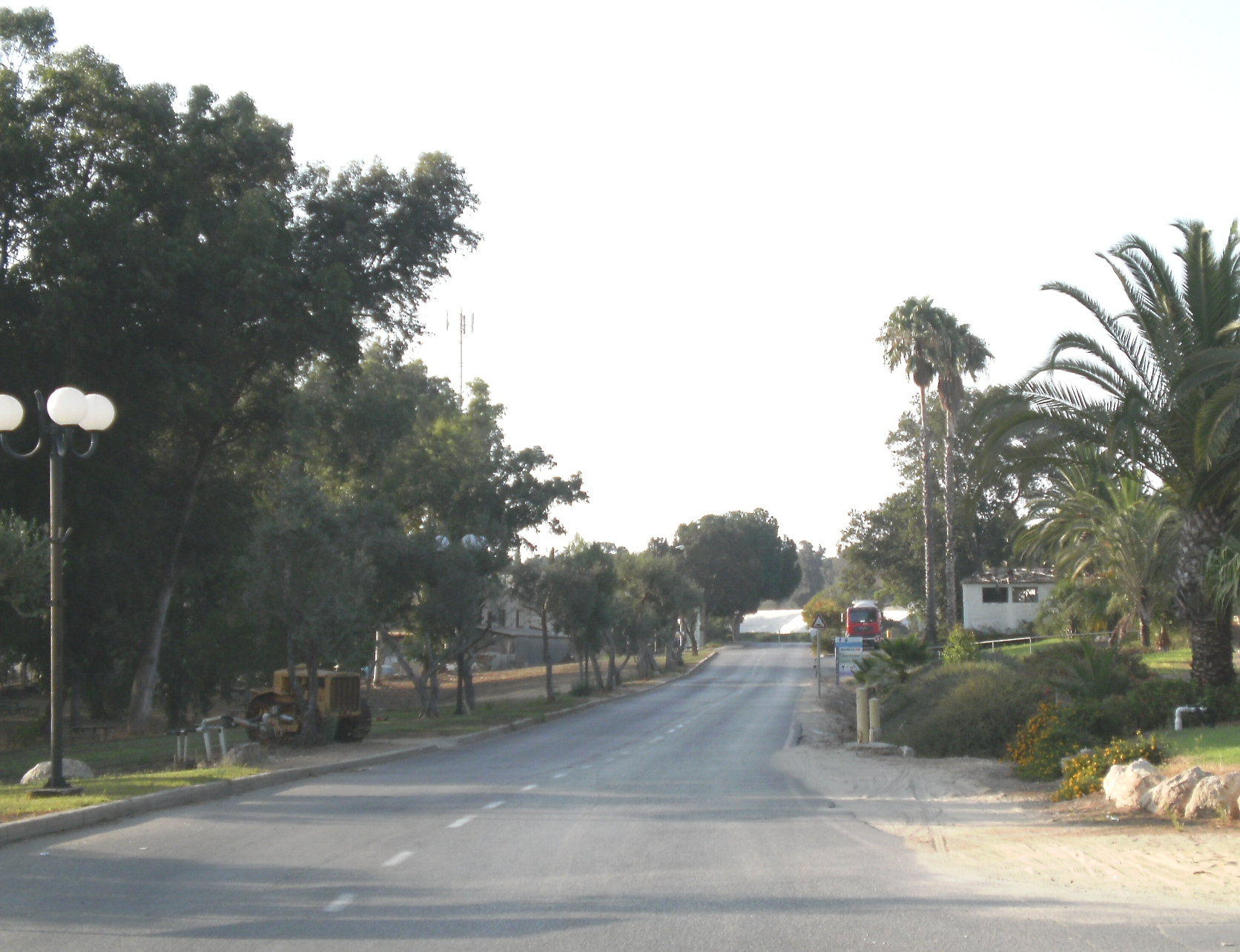

- Location within Central Israel
- Coordinates: 31°53′01″N 34°51′28″E
- Country: Israel
- District: Central
- Subdistrict: Ramla
- Council: Gezer
- Affiliation: Kibbutz Movement
- Founded: 1930
- Founder: Noar HaOved
- Population (2024): 1,834
- Website: www.naan.org.il

Na'an (Hebrew: נַעַן) is a kibbutz near the city of Rehovot in Israel. Located within the Central District, it falls under the jurisdiction of Gezer Regional Council and borders the villages of Ganei Hadar, Ramot Meir and Sitria. Founded in 1930, it is the first kibbutz established by Jews born in Eretz Israel. Kibbutz Naan is the largest kibbutz in Israel in terms of population.

== History ==
=== British period ===
The Na'an kibbutz was founded in September 1930 by 42 members of the Noar HaOved youth group, on lands purchased from the Palestinian village of Al-Na'ani. This is the first kibbutz founded by members of Noar HaOved, as well as the first kibbutz established by Jews born in Eretz Israel.

The kibbutz was given its name due to its proximity to the Palestinian Arab village of Al-Na'ani. Some of the early residents of the settlement wanted to name the kibbutz Na'meh (Hebrew: נעמה) after the biblical locality of the same name.

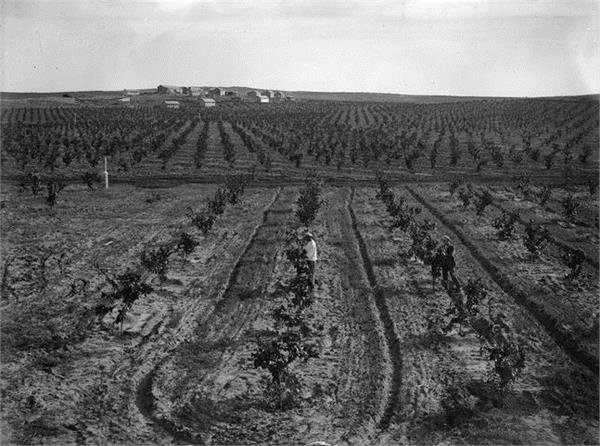
Naan 1935

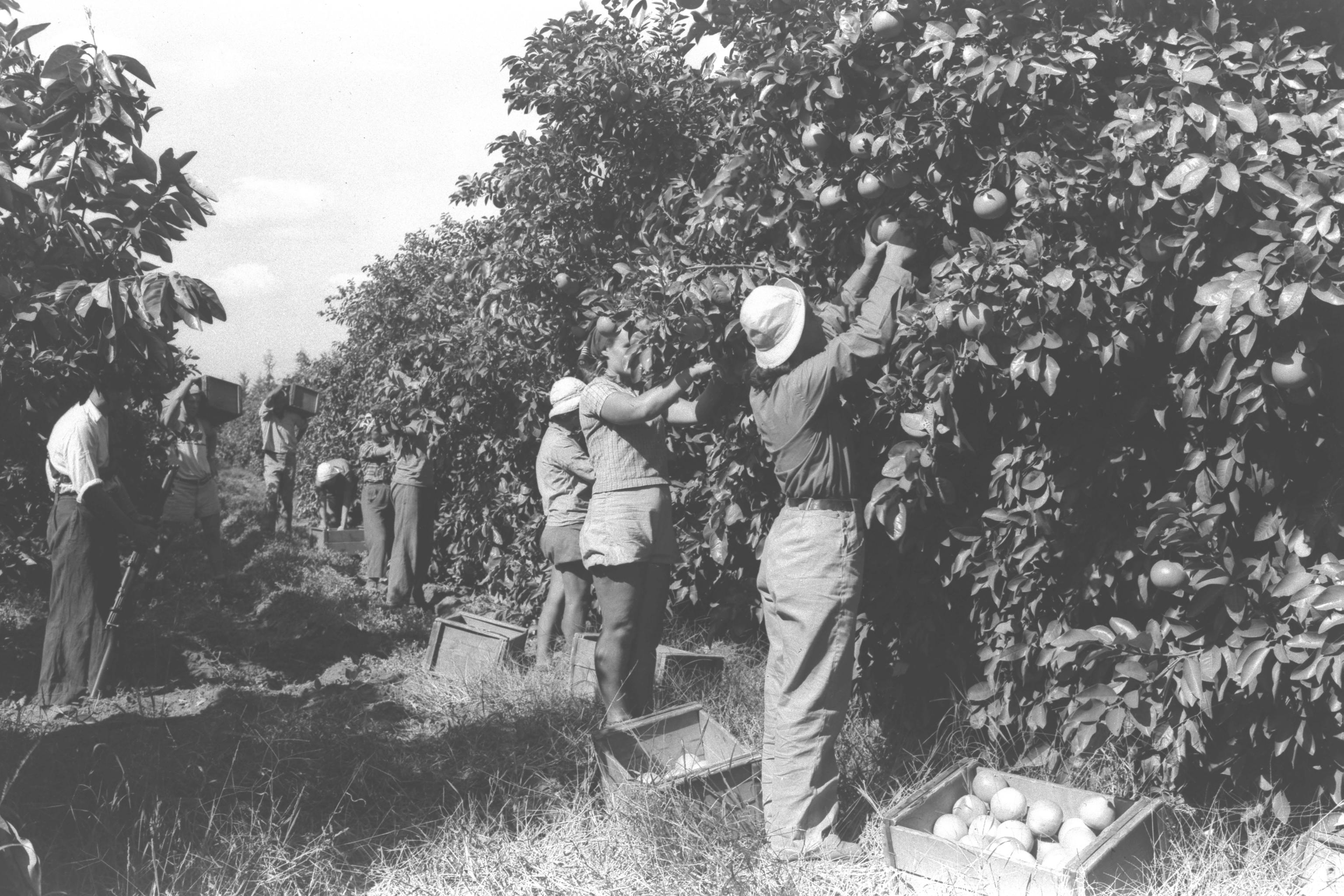
Kibbutz Na'an orange groves, 1938

Before the establishment of the state of Israel, the people of Na'an were active in both the British Jewish Brigade (two members of the kibbutz died in service during World War II) and the Haganah. Prominent Haganah leader and later Israeli parliament member Yisrael Galili was a member of the kibbutz and a large Haganah weapon cache was stored in a hidden cellar under one of the kibbutz houses. That cache was the largest cache not caught by the British Mandatory forces during Operation Agatha and kibbutz elders claim that Yisrael Galili (who evaded capture by the British) was spirited out of the kibbutz in the guise of a pregnant woman set to give birth.

In 1948, Kibbutz Na'an became the newly formed IDF's headquarters for the operation to capture Jerusalem and the elders of the then-Arab city Ramla signed the formal surrender of the city on the kibbutz grounds. Arab Al-Na'ani became depopulated on May 14, 1948.

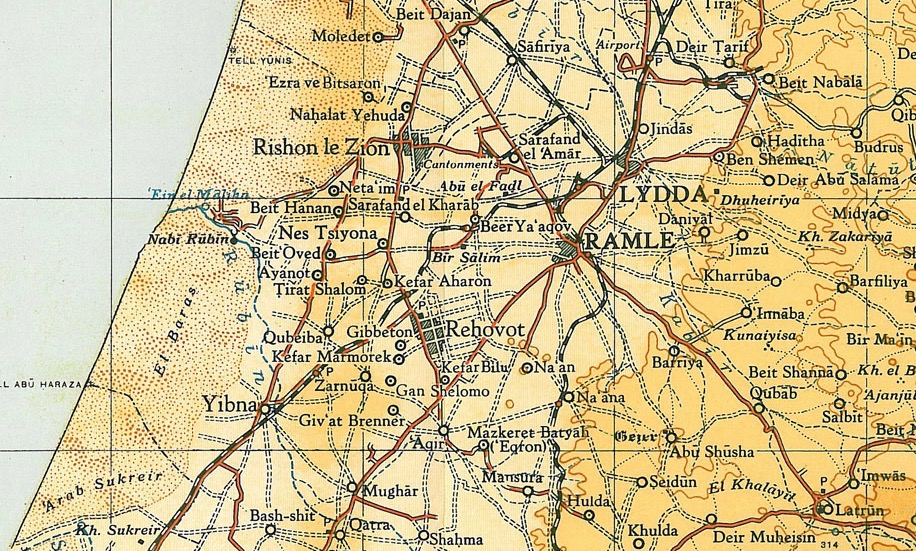
Na'an 1945 1:250,000

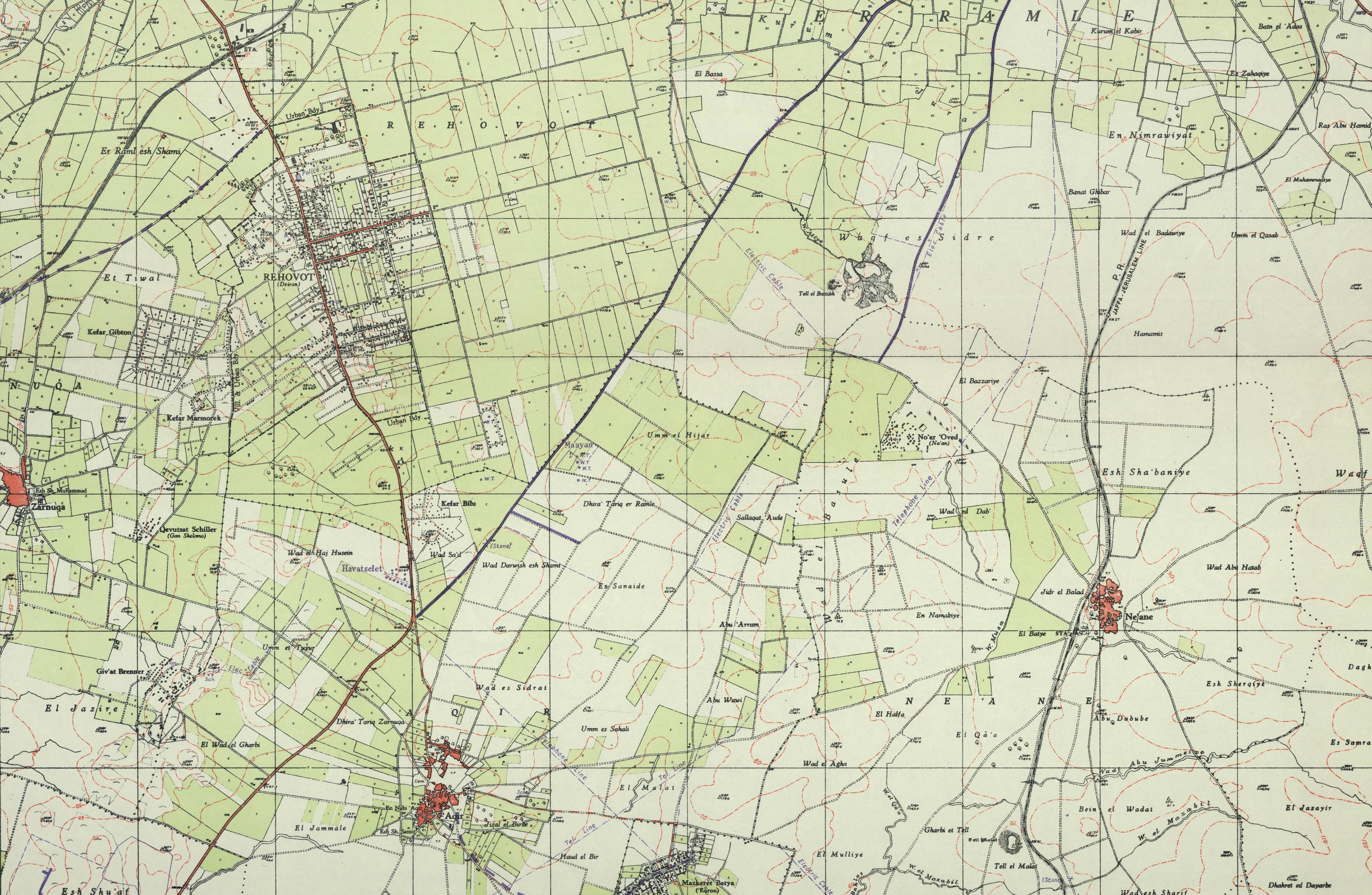
Na'an (No'ar Oved) 1948 1:20,000

=== State of Israel ===
In 1950, a 2.25 km long paved road connecting the Kibbutz to Highway 40, Highway connecting Ramla in the North to the then depopulated Arab locality of Al-Maghar and the town of Gedera in the South, was opened.

In the beginning of 2005, residents of the kibbutz decided by a majority vote to a comprehensive change that includes privatization and a transition to a differential wage with a safety net so that the residents of the community pay a community tax and in addition a "balancing tax" to secure income for financially vulnerable people in the community.

== Economy ==
=== Agriculture ===
Over the years, Na'an's economy flourished. At first Na'an sustained itself mainly through agriculture, growing fruits and vegetables and boasting a successful large dairy farm and sheep farm.

=== Irrigation technology ===
As time progressed, Na'an went into field irrigation technology, as irrigation equipment has been high in demand in arid Israel. What began as a workshop has flourished and by the late 70s was one of the most successful factories in the Kibbutz Movement, producing sprinklers, micro-irrigation and other related equipment. Na'an Irrigation Systems is renowned for developing the underground sprinkler system. By the mid-1980s, growing competition and decrease in demand forced the factory into a considerable slowdown. After roughly 20 years of struggles, Na'an Irrigation Systems merged with Indian conglomerate Jain Irrigation in 2007. After having acquired 50% of the company for $25 million in 2007, Jain Irrigation acquired the remaining 50% from the kibbutz in 2012 for an estimated $35 million. The sale of NaaDanJain to Jain Irrigation was criticized by the general manager of the Kibbutz Industry Association on account of worries that NaanDanJain would transfer its Israel-based operations outside of the country.

=== Privatization ===
During the 1980s, the kibbutz embarked on a process of privatization. Income is based on salaries paid directly to members of the kibbutz and gains from joint assets such as the irrigation factory are given as dividends (as the members of the kibbutz are considered stock owners despite not actually possessing stocks of the company). The kibbutz bases its own budget on community taxes paid by the members.

== Railway ==
Na'an is also known for being the namesake for a nearby railway junction marking the branching point of the Railway to Beersheba from the Jaffa–Jerusalem railway.

== Notable people ==
- Moshe Carmel (1911–2003), soldier and politician
- Einav Galili (born 1969), journalist, satirist, TV and radio host
- Yisrael Galili (1911–1986), soldier and politician
- Shmarya Guttman (1909–1996), often written Shmaryahu Gutman, archaeologist
- Nachum Heiman, songwriter and composer
- Erel Margalit (born 1961), politician and high-tech and social entrepreneur
- Yigal Mossinson (1917–1994), novelist, playwright, and inventor
