= Al-Na'ani =

Al-Na'ani النعاني en-Ni'aneh
- Etymology: The plant "mint"
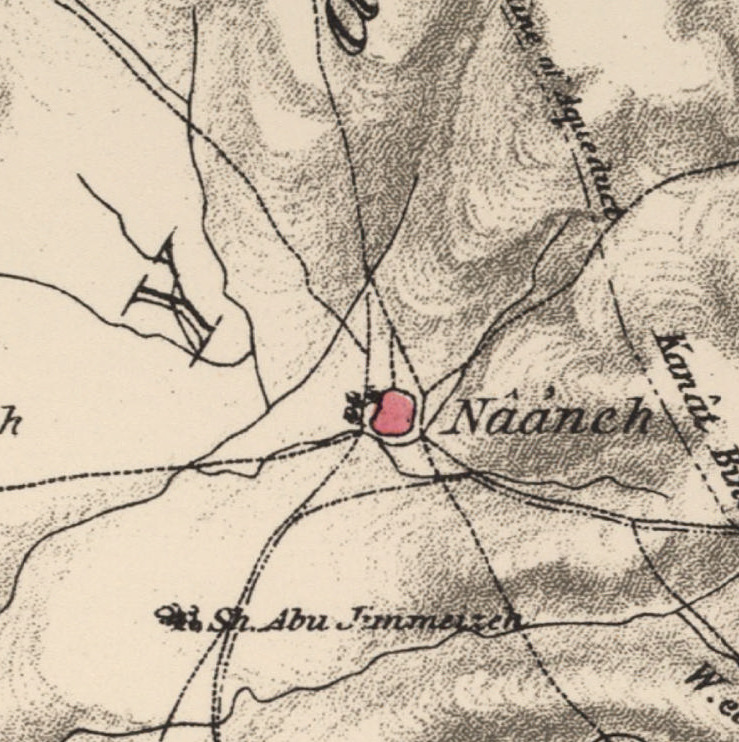
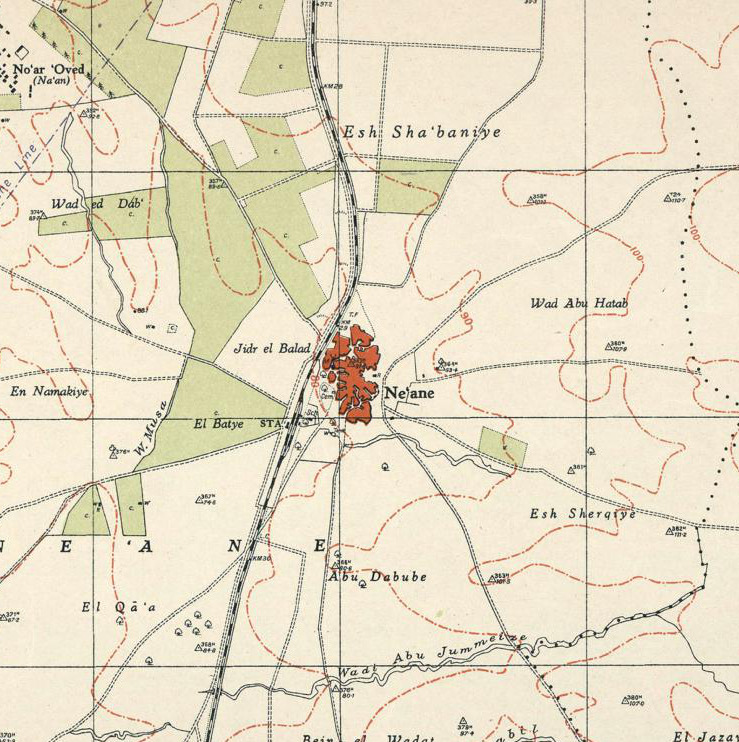
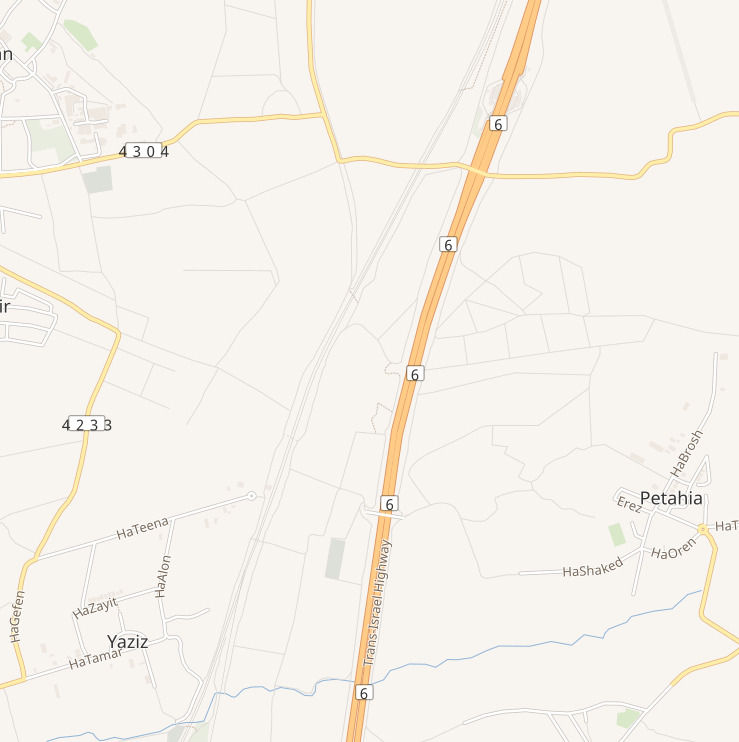
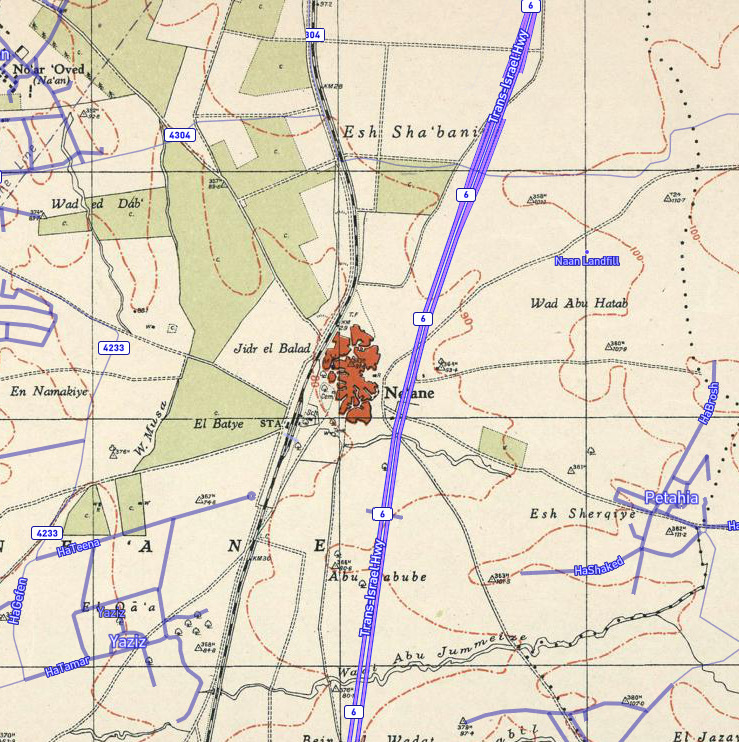
- 1870s map 1940s map modern map 1940s with modern overlay map A series of historical maps of the area around Al-Na'ani (click the buttons)

- Location within Mandatory Palestine
- Coordinates: 31°52′20″N 34°52′24″E
- Palestine grid: 138/142
- Geopolitical entity: Mandatory Palestine
- Subdistrict: Ramle
- Date of depopulation: May 14, 1948

Area
  - Total: 9,768 dunams (9.768 km^{2}; 3.771 sq mi)

Population (1945)
  - Total: 1,470
- Cause(s) of depopulation: Fear of being caught up in the fighting
- Current Localities: Na'an, Ramot Me'ir

Al-Na'ani, also called Al-Ni'ana, was a Palestinian Arab village in the Ramle Subdistrict of Mandatory Palestine. It was depopulated during the 1948 Arab–Israeli War on May 14, 1948, by the Givati Brigade during Operation Barak. It was located 6 km south of Ramle.

== History ==
It likely experienced a decline, possibly even abandonment, before being resettled by Egyptians in the 19th century. Some of its residents migrated from Hebron and Qazaza. It remained a small village throughout the 19th century.

In 1838, it was noted as a Muslim village in Er-Ramleh district.

An Ottoman village list from about 1870 counted 92 houses and a population of 265, though the population count included men, only.

In 1882, the PEF's Survey of Western Palestine described the place as: "A small mud village on low ground, identified with Naamah (near Makkedah), by Captain Warren."

=== British Mandate era ===
In the 1922 census of Palestine conducted by the British Mandate authorities, Na'ani had a population of 1,004 inhabitants; 1,002 Muslims and 2 Orthodox Christians, increasing in the 1931 census to 1,142; 1,133 Muslims and 9 Christians, in a total of 300 houses.

A British anthropologist, writing in 1932, reported that there was a group of "Sidr" trees (see Ziziphus spina-christi and Sidrat al-Muntaha) south of the village believed to be protected by spirits.

In the 1945 statistics the village had a population of 1,470; 1,450 Muslims and 20 Christians with a total of 9,768 dunums of land. Arabs used 335 dunums of land for plantations and irrigable land, 9,277 dunums for cereals, while 51 dunams were classified as built-up public areas.

The village had an elementary school which was founded in 1923, and by 1947 it had 208 students enrolled.

The Jewish kibbutz of Na'an was established in 1930, on a land purchased from Al-Na'ani. Kibbutz buildings are now on former Al-Na'ani land.

Al-Na'ani became depopulated on May 14, 1948.

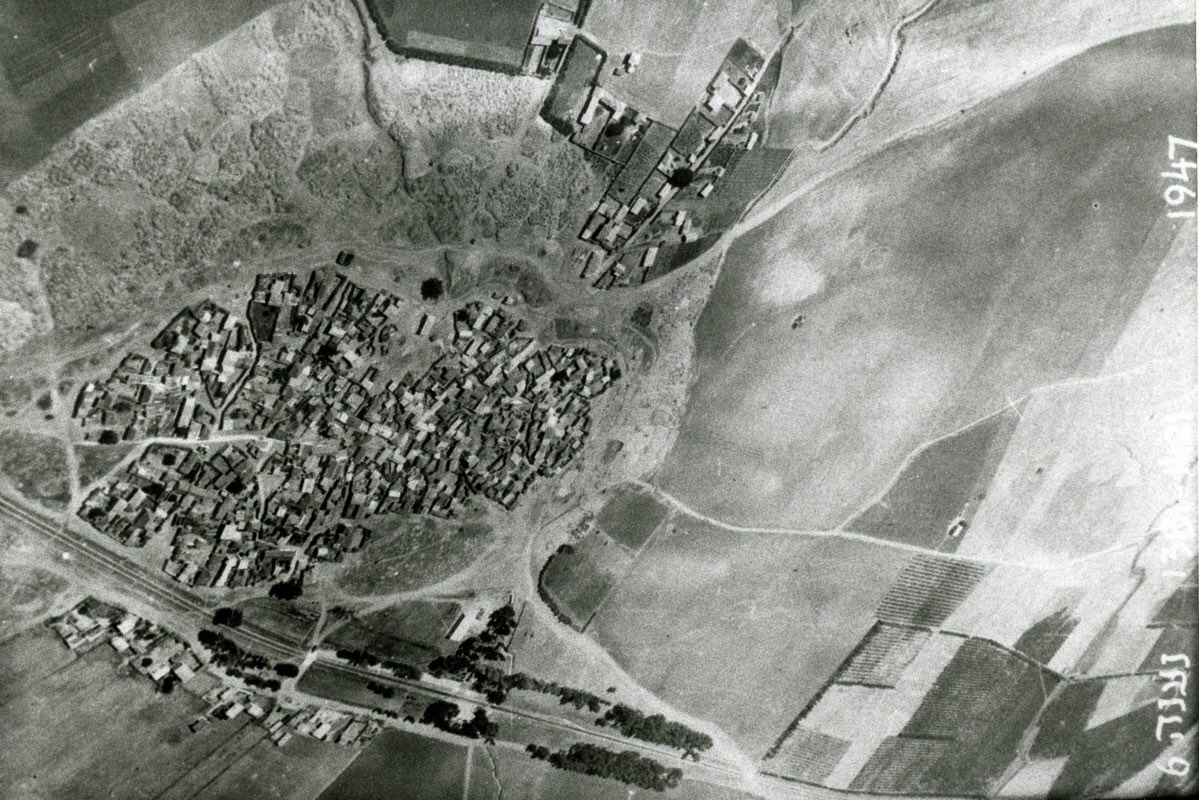
al-Na’ani 1947 from Palmach archive

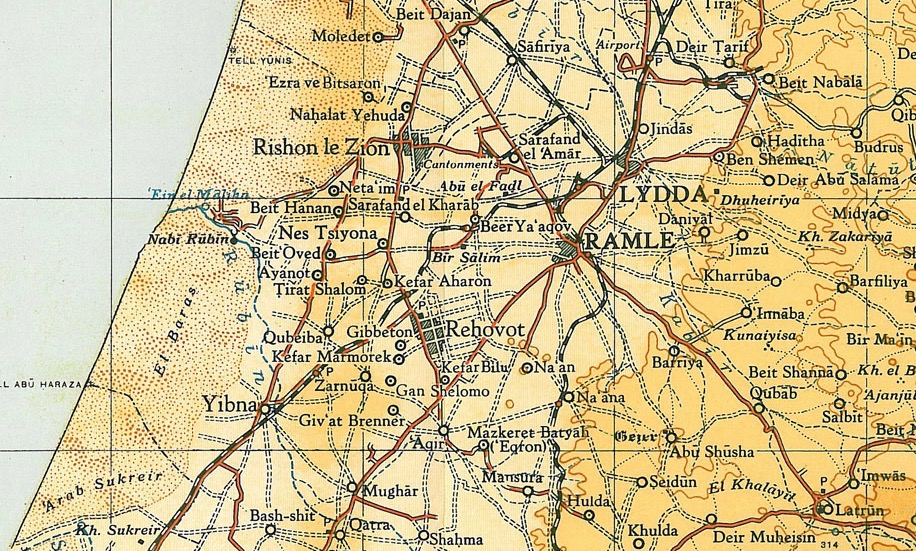
Al-Na'ani 1945 1:250,000

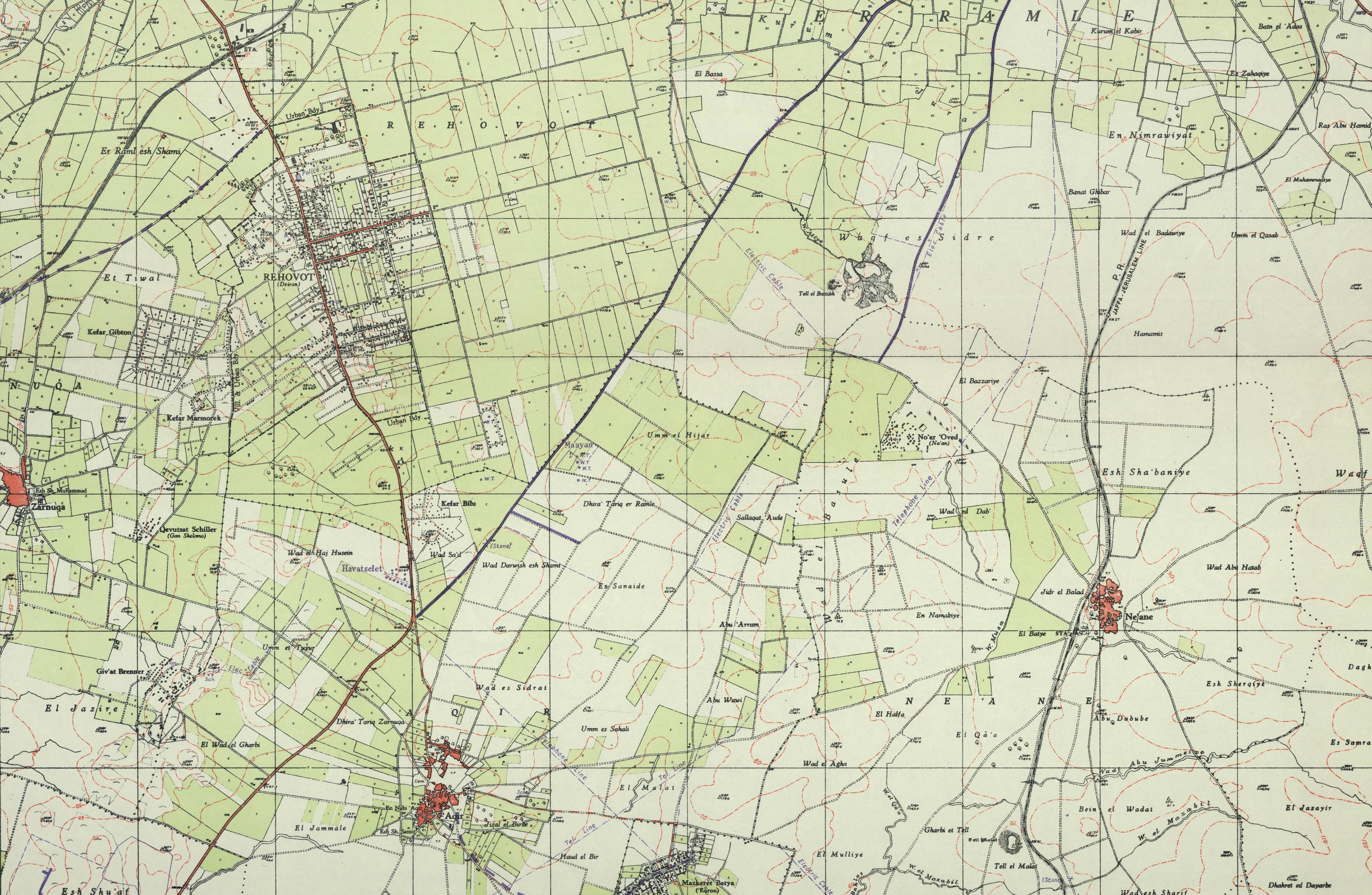
Al-Na'ani (Ne'ane) 1948 1:20,000

=== 1948, aftermath ===
In 1949 Ramot Me'ir was established on village land, west of the village site.

In 1992 the village site was described: "The site is overgrown with Christ-thorn and eucalyptus trees and a variety of wild plants. The main landmark, the railway station, is now deserted. The railway line itself is used by Israel and now extends south to Beersheba. Two deserted houses (including one belonging to Ahmad Jubayl) still remain, together with portions of houses utilized mainly for storing agricultural equipment. The land around the site is cultivated."

== Archaeology ==
The village was at the site of a historic Roman site of Tel Na'na' (Hebrew: תל נענע), where excavations have resulted in discovery of tombs and items dating to the Roman, Byzantine, and early Arab era.

== Bibliography ==
- Barron, J. B., ed. (1923). Palestine: Report and General Abstracts of the Census of 1922. Government of Palestine.
- Conder, C.R.; Kitchener, H.H. (1882). The Survey of Western Palestine: Memoirs of the Topography, Orography, Hydrography, and Archaeology. Vol. 2. London: Committee of the Palestine Exploration Fund.
- Crowfoot, G.M.; Baldensperger, Louise (1932). From Cedar to Hyssop. A study in the Folklore of Plants in Palestine. London: The Sheldon Press.
- Department of Statistics (1945). Village Statistics, April, 1945. Government of Palestine.
- Hadawi, S. (1970). Village Statistics of 1945: A Classification of Land and Area ownership in Palestine. Palestine Liberation Organization Research Center. Archived from the original on 2018-12-08.
- Hartmann, M. (1883). "Die Ortschaftenliste des Liwa Jerusalem in dem türkischen Staatskalender für Syrien auf das Jahr 1288 der Flucht (1871)". Zeitschrift des Deutschen Palästina-Vereins. 6: 102–149.
- Khalidi, W. (1992). All That Remains: The Palestinian Villages Occupied and Depopulated by Israel in 1948. Washington D.C.: Institute for Palestine Studies. ISBN 0-88728-224-5.
- Mills, E., ed. (1932). Census of Palestine 1931. Population of Villages, Towns and Administrative Areas. Jerusalem: Government of Palestine.
- Morris, B. (2004). The Birth of the Palestinian Refugee Problem Revisited. Cambridge University Press. ISBN 978-0-521-00967-6.(p. 257)
- Palmer, E.H. (1881). The Survey of Western Palestine: Arabic and English Name Lists Collected During the Survey by Lieutenants Conder and Kitchener, R. E. Transliterated and Explained by E.H. Palmer. Committee of the Palestine Exploration Fund.
- Robinson, E.; Smith, E. (1841). Biblical Researches in Palestine, Mount Sinai and Arabia Petraea: A Journal of Travels in the year 1838. Vol. 3. Boston: Crocker & Brewster.
- Socin, A. (1879). "Alphabetisches Verzeichniss von Ortschaften des Paschalik Jerusalem". Zeitschrift des Deutschen Palästina-Vereins. 2: 135–163.
