= Aharon Yariv =

Israeli politician and general

- אהרן יריב
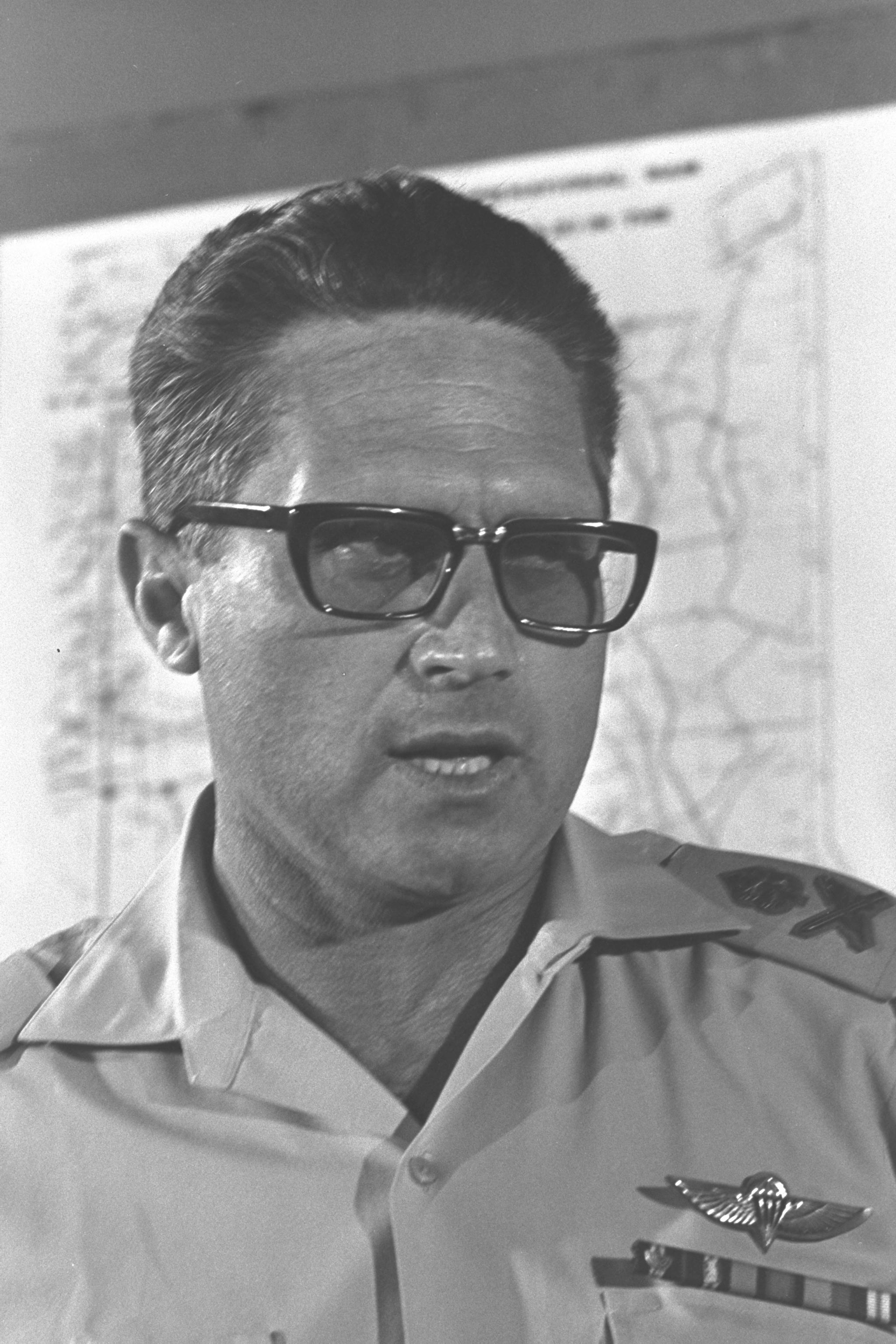

Ministerial roles
- 1974: Minister of Transportation
- 1974–1975: Minister of Information

Faction represented in the Knesset
- 1974–1977: Alignment

Personal details
- Born: 20 December 1920 Moscow, Russian SFSR
- Died: 7 May 1994 (aged 73)
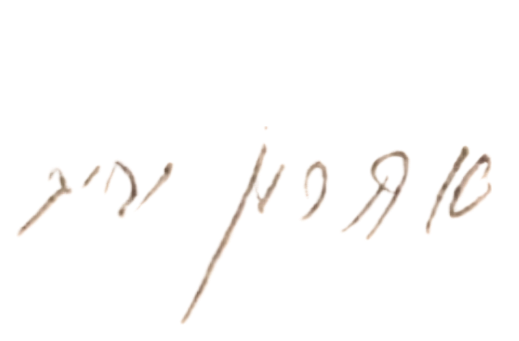
- Signature

Aharon Yariv (Hebrew: אהרן יריב; 20 December 1920 – 7 May 1994) was a Russian-born Israeli politician and general. During his military career, he was the first chief of the IDF Command and Staff College (PUM), Chief of Staff of the Central Military District, commander of the Golani Brigade, and from 1964 to 1972 Head of the Military Intelligence Directorate (AMAN), playing a significant role in the preparation of the Six-Day War. After completing his military service, he was an adviser to the Prime Minister on combating terror, then a member of the Knesset from the Maarah bloc, Minister of Transport and Minister of Information of Israel. During this period, he became one of the co-authors of the Yariva-Shem-Tova formula, which lists the conditions for Israel's negotiations with the Palestinians. Leaving public office in 1975, two years later he created the Center for Strategic Studies at Tel Aviv University, which he headed until his death.

== Biography ==
Aharon ("Aharale") Rabinovich (later Yariv) was born in Moscow in the Russian Soviet Federative Socialist Republic. He immigrated to Mandatory Palestine at the age of 15 and studied at the Pardes Hanna Agricultural High School. He began his military service in the Haganah in 1938, and later served as an officer in the British Army during World War II.

== Military and political career ==
Yariv served in the Israel Defense Forces as a field officer. He was a battalion commander during the 1948 Arab-Israeli War and subsequently became a brigade commander. Later he served as the Israeli military attaché to Washington. During 1953-1956 he was a member of the founding team and the first commander of the IDF Command and Staff College. From 1964 to 1972, he was head of Aman, the IDF's military intelligence. After the Munich Massacre in 1972, he became Prime Minister Golda Meir's advisor on counterterrorism and directed Mossad assassinations following the Munich massacre. During the Yom Kippur War of 1973 he was appointed as a special assistant to the IDF chief of staff and at the end of the war led the Israeli military delegation at the Kilometer 101 ceasefire talks with Egypt's General Mohamed Abdel Ghani el-Gamasy which endeavoured to bring about a military disengagement treaty.

After leaving the army, he joined the Alignment political party. He was elected to the Knesset in the 1973 elections, and was appointed Transportation Minister, and then Information Minister. He resigned from the latter post in 1975, and then from the Knesset shortly before the 1977 elections. In March 1979 he concluded the PLO had failed to disrupt normal life, halt immigration or deter tourism.

In 1977 he founded the Center for Strategic Studies at Tel Aviv University (later renamed the Jaffee Center for Strategic Studies and now the Institute for National Security Studies), Israel’s leading national security think tank. He headed the Institute until his death in 1994.

== Commemoration ==
Yitzhak Rabin, Prime Minister at the time of his death, gave the eulogy at his funeral in 1994.

The role of Yariv was played by Amos Lavi in Steven Spielberg's 2005 film Munich.
