= The Generals' Revolt =

1948 Israeli military dispute

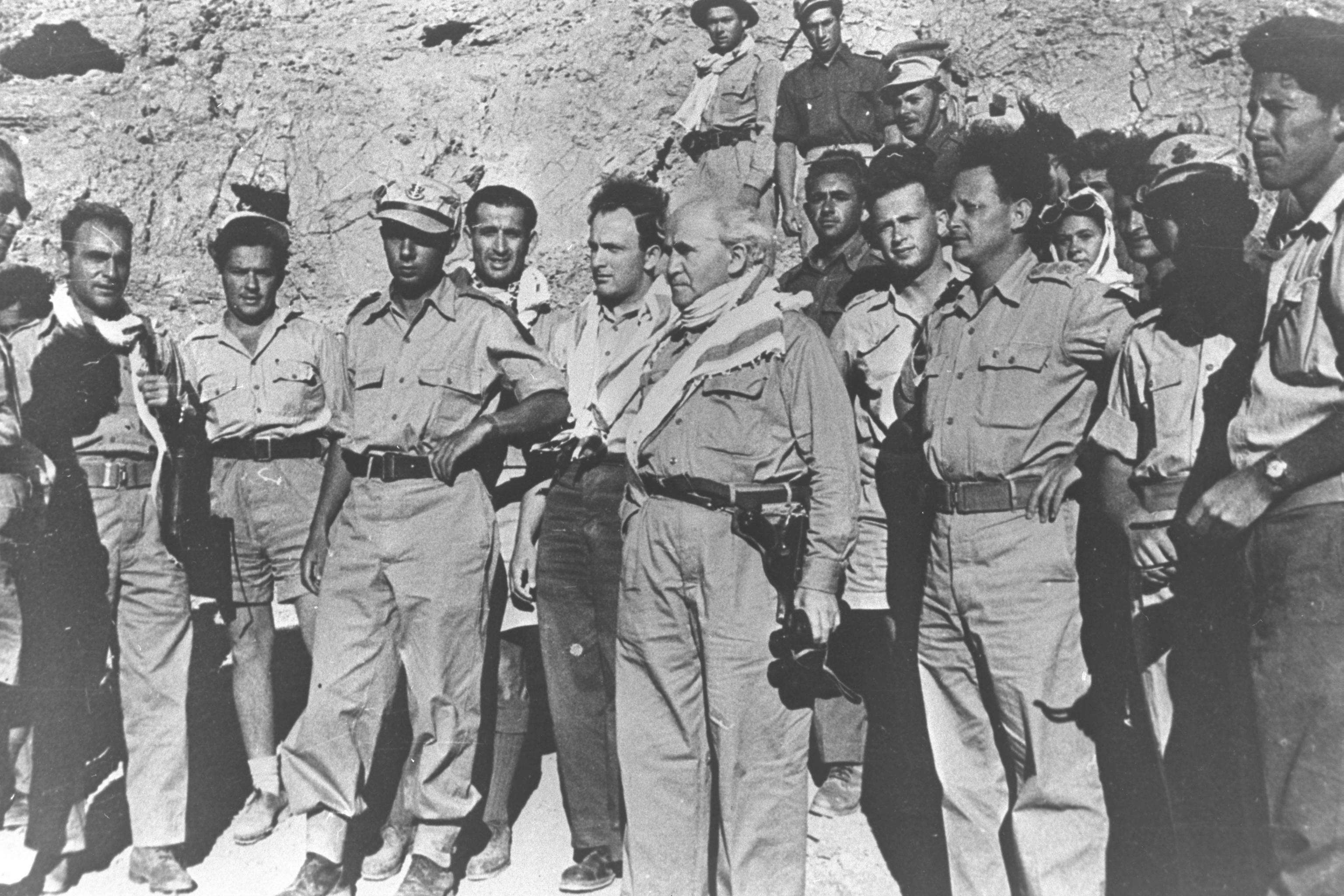
Ben Gurion (holding field glasses) in 1948. Standing behind him is Yitzhak Rabin; to his left is Yigal Allon.

The Generals' Revolt was a series of confrontations between David Ben-Gurion and generals of the newly formed Israel Defense Forces (IDF) in 1948, on the eve of the establishment of the State of Israel.

The backdrop to the dispute was Ben Gurion's insistence on having commanders from his own Mapai party appointed to senior posts in the IDF. It mostly centered upon Yisrael Galili, the Mapam Head of National Command, who was finally unseated by Ben-Gurion in June in the midst of the 1948 Arab–Israeli war.

== History ==
=== Ben-Gurion’s Army plans ===
Ben-Gurion had three objectives:

1. Replacing the existing Yishuv structures of control over the Haganah and replacing them with a centralised chain of command
2. dissolving units connected with political movements and creating a unified national army
3. building an army based on the British Army model, breaking with the Palmach "revolutionary army" tradition

In 1946 Ben-Gurion tried to appoint loyal supporters into the upper echelons of the Haganah but was unsuccessful. The following year, there was a debate within the defence establishment about what form of armed forces the Yishuv should have in the anticipated conflict. Ben-Gurion proposed an entirely new organisation to replace the Haganah, modelled on the British Army. These new ideas shocked the Haganah leadership. The Haganah had not been active since withdrawing from direct action against the British authorities in July 1946, and the crisis threatened morale within Haganah units. Rather than damage the existing structures, Ben-Gurion allowed his ideas to be dropped.

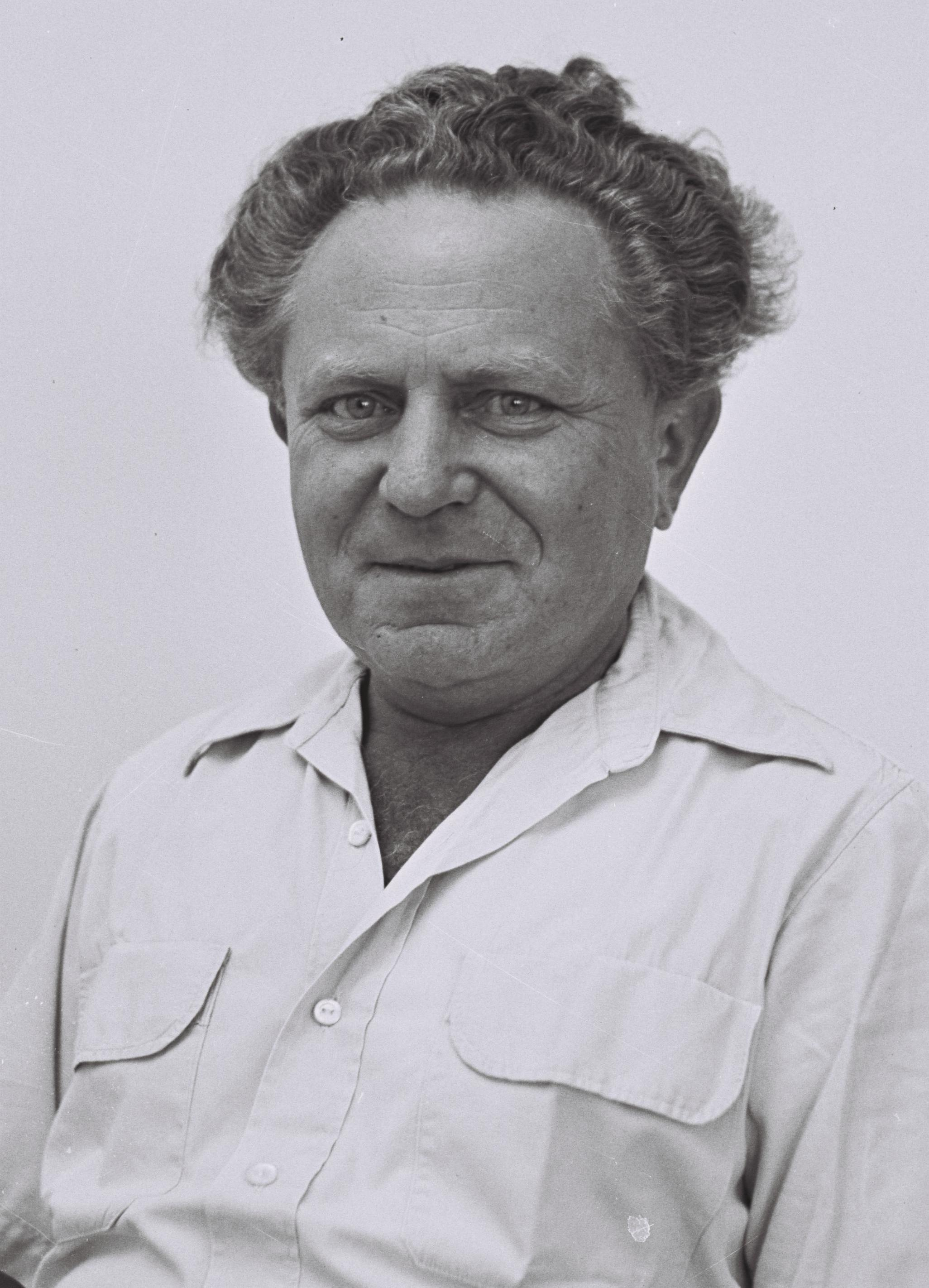
Yisrael Galili

=== The sacking of Galili ===
In April 1948, while Chief of Staff, Yaakov Dori, was absent due to ill health, Ben-Gurion came to the decision to abolish the post of Head of National Command, and give himself, as Minister of Defence, direct control over the General Staff. This post was held by Yisrael Galili, one of the leaders of Mapam, the pro-Soviet rivals to Ben-Gurion's Mapai party. On 26 April Ben-Gurion notified Galili of the decision. After Galili raised objections, on 3 May, Ben-Gurion issued an official letter:

"The post of head of the national command is hereby abolished, and Israel Galili's appointment to the post is terminated. The staff of the security forces will henceforth receive its instructions exclusively from the director of security [Ben-Gurion himself] or his representative."

A majority of senior IDF officers at that time were from Mapam, and the response from several of them was to threaten to resign. Mapam's newspaper, Al HaMishmar, predicted the result would be "a personal dictatorship." On 6 May the Haganah leadership presented Ben-Gurion with an ultimatum:

"The heads of departments consider it essential to restore [Yisrael Galili] to his post until final arrangements are made. If this matter is not settled within the next 12 hours, the heads of departments will cease to consider themselves responsible for the conduct of affairs."

Ben-Gurion refused to reinstate Galili, but accepted a compromise whereby Galili was a member of the General Staff, but with unspecified duties and the threatened resignations were withdrawn.

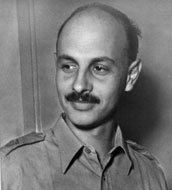
Yigael Yadin

=== The Second Round ===
In June 1948, Ben-Gurion tried again. He proposed reorganising the Haganah to give the IDF a unified command built on four battle zones. An underlying motive for the changes was to purge the IDF HQ of Mapam officers. In response, on 24 June, the acting Chief of Staff, Yigael Yadin and a group of staff officers put forward a plan for the restructuring, which included their suggestions as to who should be in command of each of the four Commands. Yadin was not from Mapam, but three of the four suggested appointments were.

Ben-Gurion put forward counter-suggestions, with three British Army veterans to be department heads in the General Staff: including 28-year-old Mordechai Makleff as commander of the Eastern Command and Moshe Dayan as commander of Jerusalem. Yadin joined Mapam members in accusing Ben-Gurion of political interference in the army, with particular focus on Makleff who was regarded as inexperienced. A group of generals led by Yadin submitted their resignations. These included Mapam generals Cohen (Ben Hur), Zvi Ayalon and Galili.

At a stormy cabinet meeting Ben-Gurion accepted the setting up of a five-man committee headed by Interior Minister Yitzhak Gruenbaum to consider the structure of the high command, on condition that Galili was dismissed. During its secret sessions the committee heard complaints of Ben-Gurion's "incessant intervention in operational decisions" as in the recent attacks on Latrun. In the media Mapam accused Ben-Gurion of attacking the Palmach. The committee proposed that there should be a multi-party war cabinet, and that there should be two director generals from different parties: one between Ben-Gurion and the Minister of Defence, and one between Ben-Gurion and the army. With eight days until the end of the first truce, Ben-Gurion announced his resignation as Prime Minister and as Minister of Defence. In the negotiations that followed the cabinet agreed to withdraw the committee's recommendations and Ben-Gurion dropped his appointment suggestions and his threat of resigning. Galili was removed from all positions of influence and Ben-Gurion remained supreme commander.
