= Yisrael Galili =

Israeli politician (1911–1986)

- יִשְׂרָאֵל גְּלִילִי
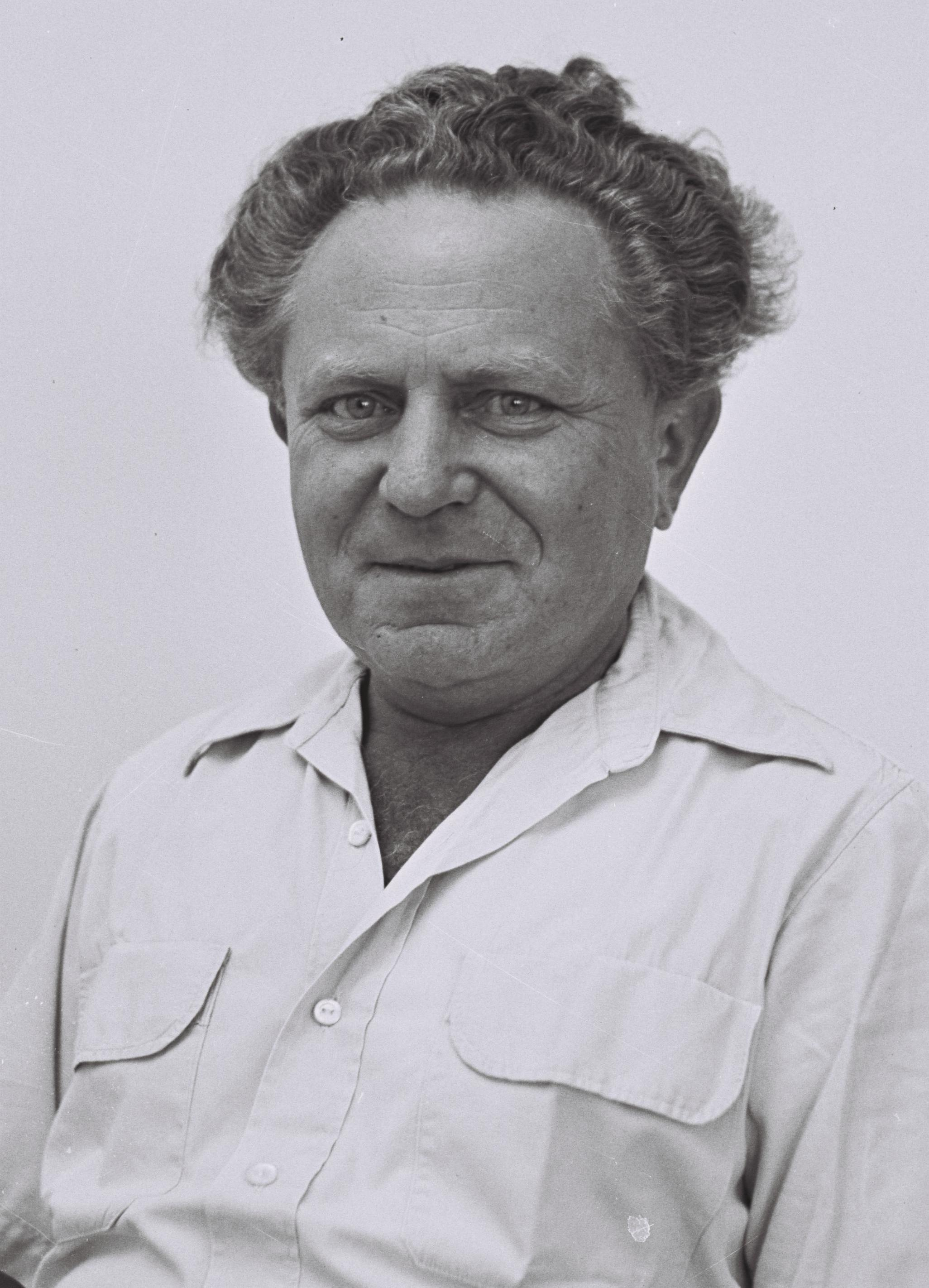
- Galili in 1955

Ministerial roles
- 1966–1967: Minister without Portfolio
- 1967–1969: Minister of Information
- 1969–1977: Minister without Portfolio

Faction represented in the Knesset
- 1949–1951: Mapam
- 1955–1965: Ahdut HaAvoda
- 1965–1968: Alignment
- 1968–1969: Labor Party
- 1969–1977: Alignment

Personal details
- Born: 10 February 1911 Brailiv, Podolia Governorate, Russian Empire
- Died: 8 February 1986 (aged 74) Na'an, Israel

Yisrael Galili (Hebrew: יִשְׂרָאֵל גְּלִילִי; 10 February 1911 – 8 February 1986) was an Israeli politician, government minister and member of the Knesset. Before Israel's independence in 1948, he served as Chief of Staff of Haganah, the main Zionist paramilitary organization that operated for the Yishuv in the British Mandate for Palestine.

== Biography ==
Yisrael Berchenko (later Galili) was born in the town of Brailiv in the Russian Empire (now Ukraine). His family immigrated to Palestine when he was three years old and settled in Jaffa. Galili attended school there and apprenticed to be a printer.

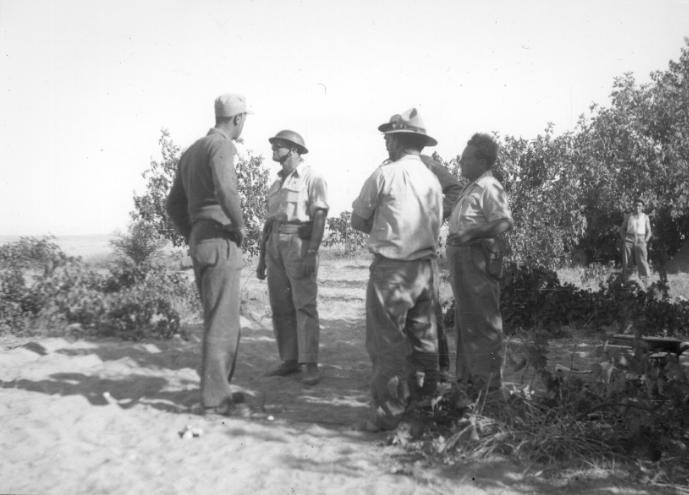
Israel Galili meeting with other commanders during Operation Yoav

Galili was a founder of the HaNoar HaOved ("Working Youth") youth group, and of Na'an, a kibbutz where he lived until his death.

== Military career ==
Galili began his military career in 1927, when he enlisted in the Haganah. He was appointed to the organization's leadership committee in 1935, and was later placed in charge of Acquisitions and Armaments. During the Second World War, he was involved in preparations to counter an anticipated German invasion of Palestine. He was appointed Chief of Staff of the Haganah in 1946, and served in that capacity until June 1948 when he was removed by David Ben-Gurion in what was called the "Generals' Revolt".

== Political career ==
He served in the first Knesset from 1949 to 1951, and then again from 1955 until 1977, first on behalf of the Mapam party, before being part of the split that formed Ahdut HaAvoda and later merged into the Alignment. He served briefly as Minister of Information and was Minister without Portfolio in several governments. One of Prime Minister Golda Meir's top advisers, and member of her Cabinet, he was also a member of the prestigious Foreign Affairs and Defense Committee and on the Ministerial Committee for Settlement.

Victor John Ostrovsky, a self-proclaimed former katsa (case officer) for the Israeli Mossad (foreign intelligence service) claimed in his book By Way of Deception that Galili had a lengthy affair with Golda Meir who was some 13 years his senior.
