= Ramot Meir =

Moshav in central Israel

Ramot Meir: רָמוֹת מֵאִיר (Hebrew)
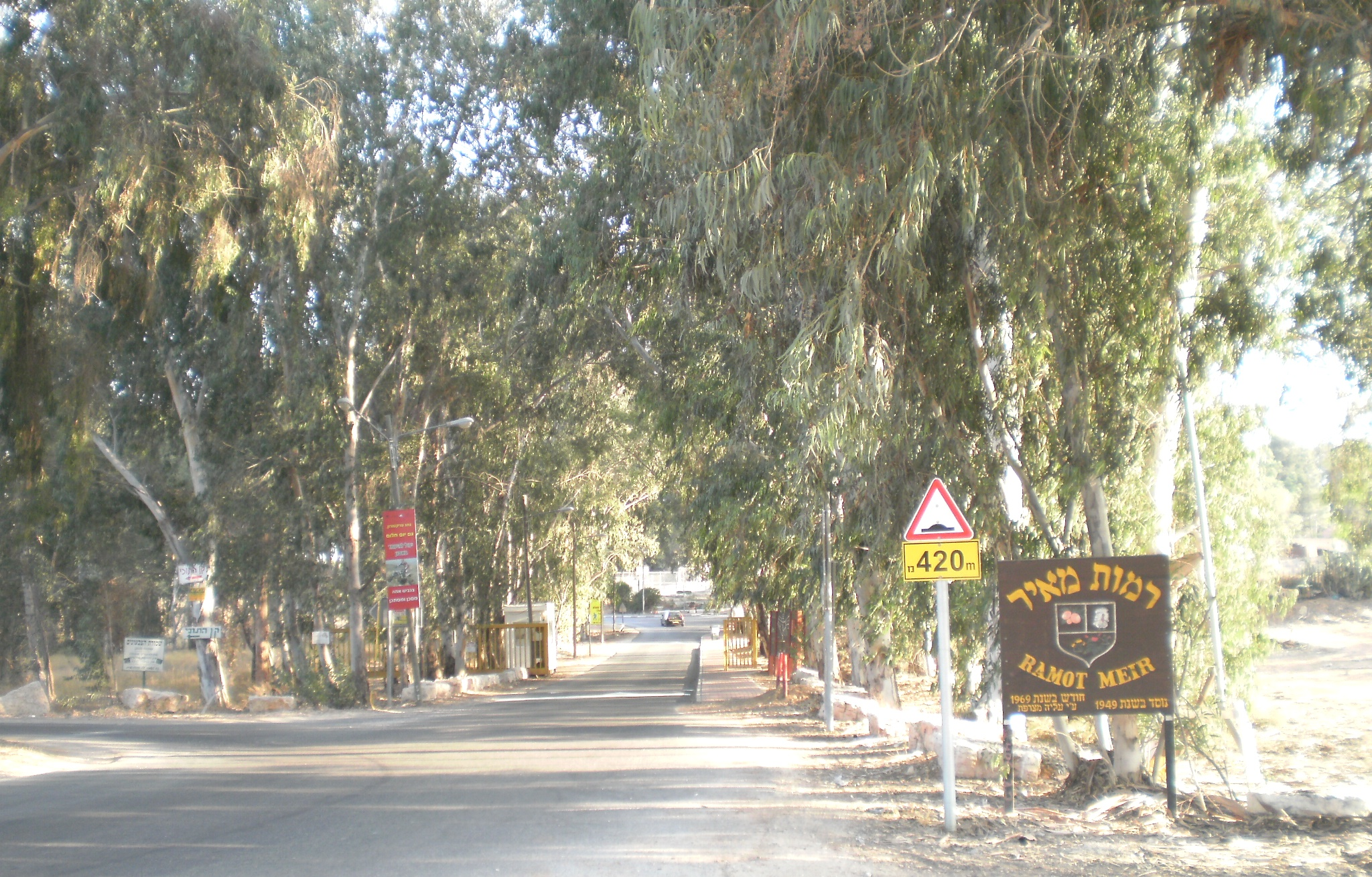

- Location within Central Israel
- Coordinates: 31°52′27″N 34°51′19″E
- Country: Israel
- District: Central
- Subdistrict: Ramla
- Council: Gezer
- Affiliation: Moshavim Movement
- Founded: 1949
- Founder: Demobilised soldiers
- Population (2024): 674
- Website: ramotmeir.co.il

Ramot Meir (Hebrew: רָמוֹת מֵאִיר, lit. 'Meir Heights') is a moshav ovdim in central Israel. Located in the Shephelah around four kilometres south of Rehovot, it falls under the jurisdiction of Gezer Regional Council. In 2024 it had a population of 674. Near the entrance of the Moshav there is a small nature reserve with natural wild tulips.

== History ==
The moshav was founded in 1949 by demobilised soldiers, and was named after the American philanthropist and dentist Meyer Rosoff. Rosoff had bought the land around the Palestinian village of al-Na'ani in the 1930s for his company, Rosoff Group Plantations. After the 1948 war, it expanded on more of the nearby land.

It collapsed in 1965, but was re-established in 1969 by a group of immigrants from France (who had originally moved there from North Africa)
