= Einav Galili =

Israeli journalist, satirist, television and radio host

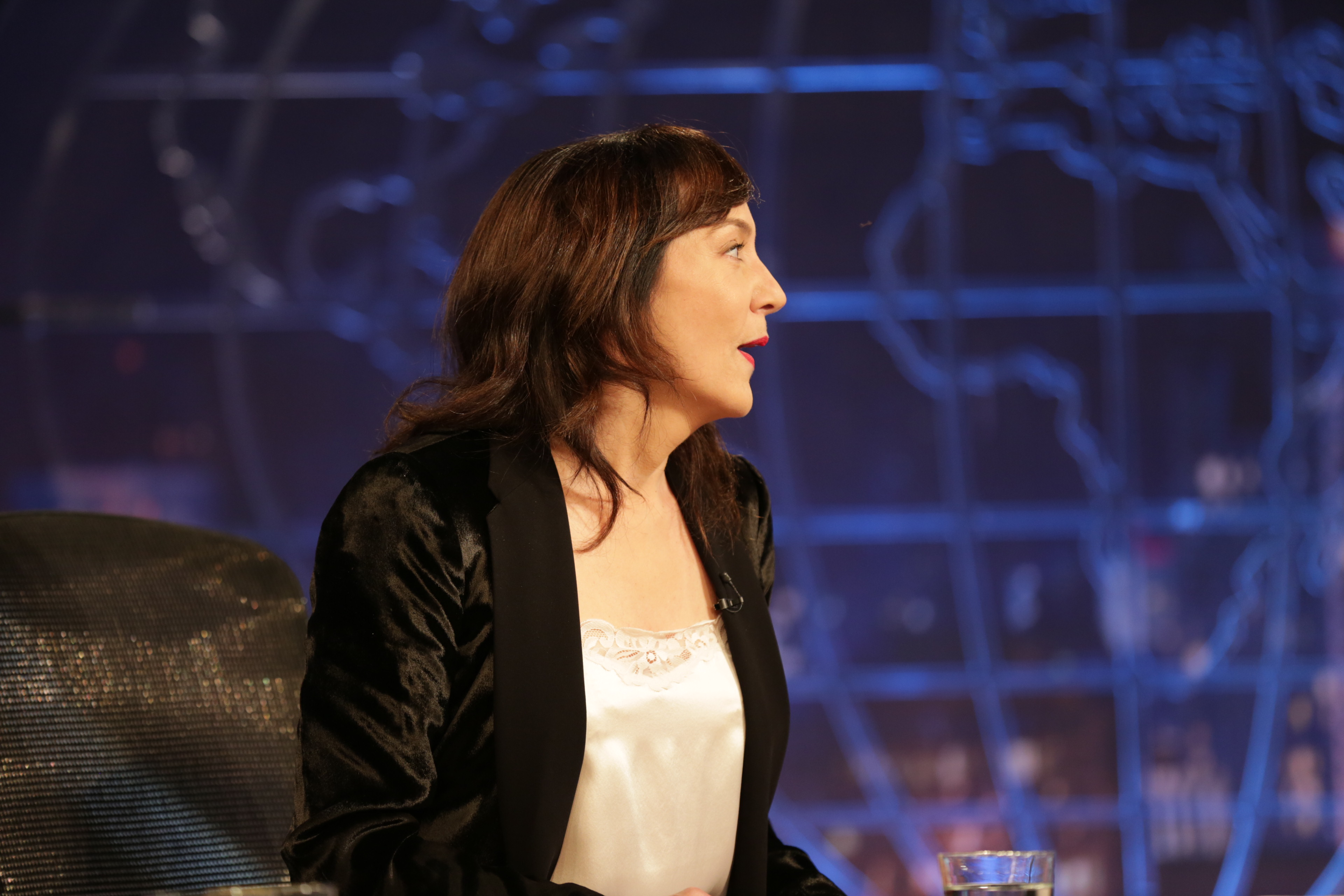
Einav Galili

Einav Galili (Hebrew: עינב גלילי; born 21 April 1969) is an Israeli journalist, satirist, television host and radio host.

== Biography ==
Einav Galili was born on Kibbutz Na'an. She is the daughter of Eilat Galili and granddaughter of Yisrael Galili, a Knesset member who served as Information Minister of Israel in 1967–1969. She has two children.
