= Ministry of Public Diplomacy (Israel) =

Post in the cabinet of Israel

Ministry of Information
- משרד ההסברה

Agency overview
- Formed: 1974, 2009, 2015, 2023
- Dissolved: 1975, 2013, 2020, 2023
- Jurisdiction: Government of Israel

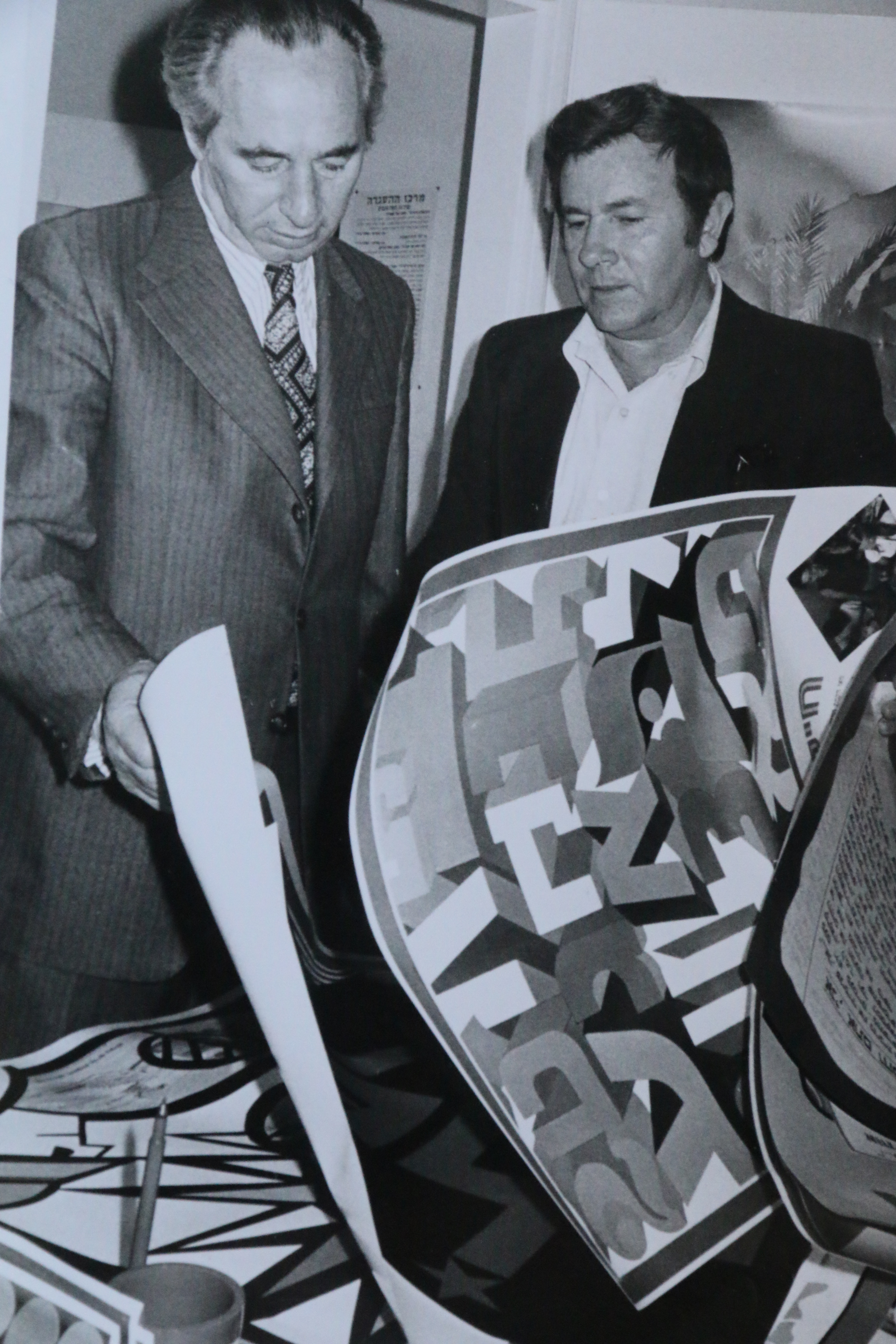
Minister of Information Shimon Peres in 1974

The Minister of Information (Hebrew: שר ההסברה, Sar HaHasbara) was a post in the cabinet of Israel.

== List of portfolio holders ==
#	Minister	Party	Governments	Term start	Term end
Minister of Information
1	Yisrael Galili	Alignment; Labor Party; Alignment	13th	5 June 1967	17 March 1969
2	Shimon Peres	Alignment	16th	10 March 1974	3 June 1974
3	Aharon Yariv	Alignment	17th	3 June 1974	4 February 1975
Minister of Information and Diaspora
4	Yuli Edelstein	Likud	32nd	31 March 2009	17 March 2013
Minister of Strategic Affairs & Public Diplomacy
5	Gilad Erdan	Likud	34th	2 September 2015	17 May 2020
Minister of Information
6	Galit Distel-Atbaryan	Likud	37th	29 December 2022	12 October 2023

== See also ==
- Public diplomacy of Israel
- Israel Government Advertising Agency
