= Lior Schleien =

Israeli satirist

- ליאור שליין
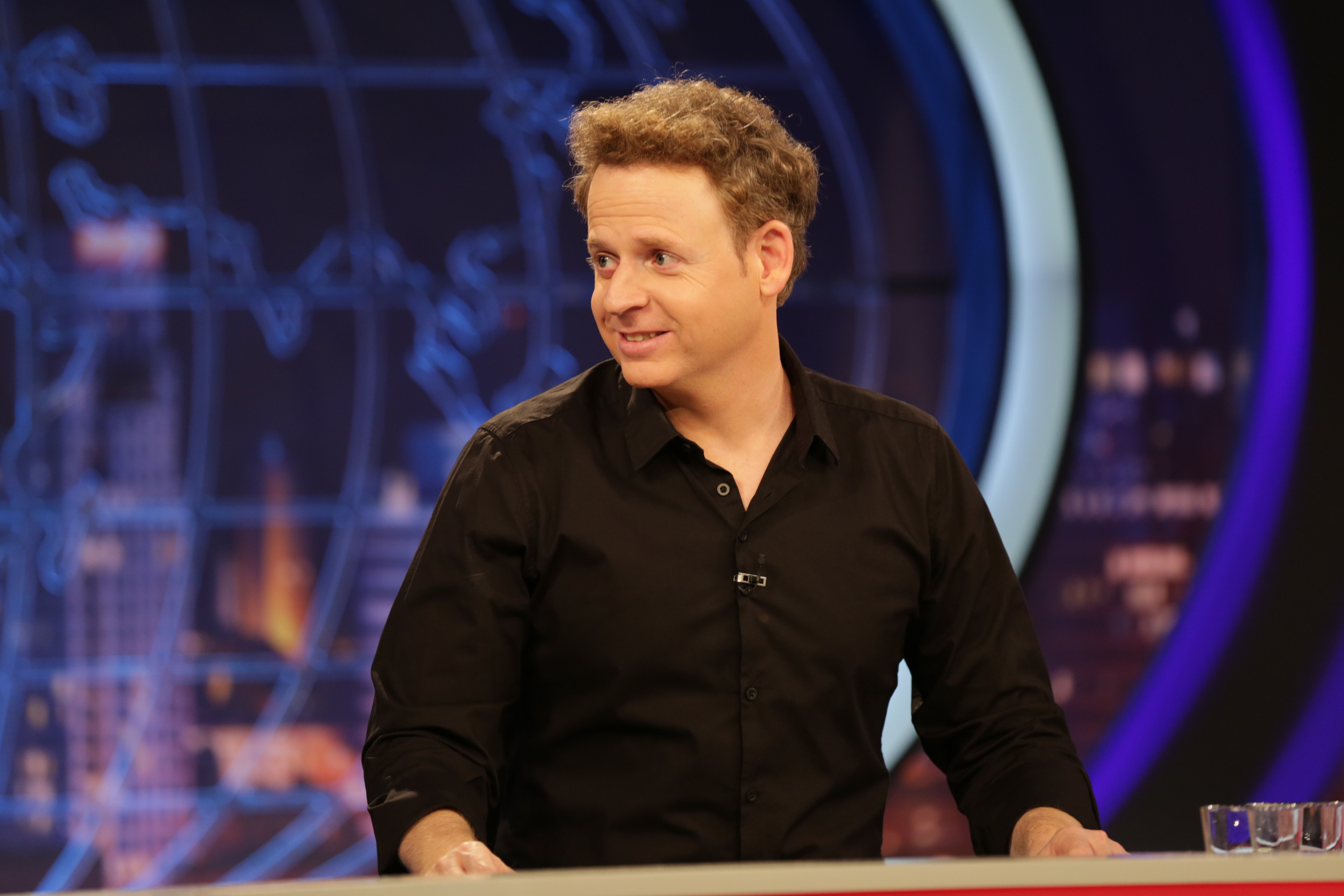
- Lior Schleien, December 2015
- Born: Lior Mordechai Schlein; 1 July 1978 (age 48); Tel Aviv, Israel
- Education: Tel Aviv University (LL.B., LL.M.)
- Occupation: Television host
- Partner: Merav Michaeli (since 2007)
- Children: 3

Lior Schleien (Hebrew: ליאור שליין; born 1 July 1978) is an Israeli television producer and host.

== Career ==
Schleien started his television career in 2002, by writing and hosting a satire segment on Yair Lapid's talk show. He later joined the writing staff of Eretz Nehederet and since 2004 he has been creating, producing and hosting his own shows, including Tonight ("HaLayla") which won the Israeli Academy Award for Best Talk Show.

He is the creator and host of the prime time comedy and satire TV show Matzav Ha'Uma. President Shimon Peres, Prime Minister Benjamin Netanyahu and Joan Rivers (in a special episode which was taped in New York), were some of the guests on the show, which won the Israeli Academy Award for Best Comedy Show twice, in 2012–2013, and its seventh season, which ended in April 2014, received average ratings of 24%.

In 2011, he created, produced and hosted When Will the Cops Come? – The Freedom of Speech Prom (Matay Yavo Shoter? – Mesibat Sium Hofesh Habituy), a gathering of comedians and media personalities in protest against new laws of the Israeli government that they viewed as restricting the freedom of speech. In the event, which took place in Tel Aviv, every speaker was allocated 5 minutes to say anything on his mind, without reprisal, in the eleventh hour before the new laws were enacted.

In 2013, he was chosen by Ha'aretz as the fourth most influential person on Israeli Television.

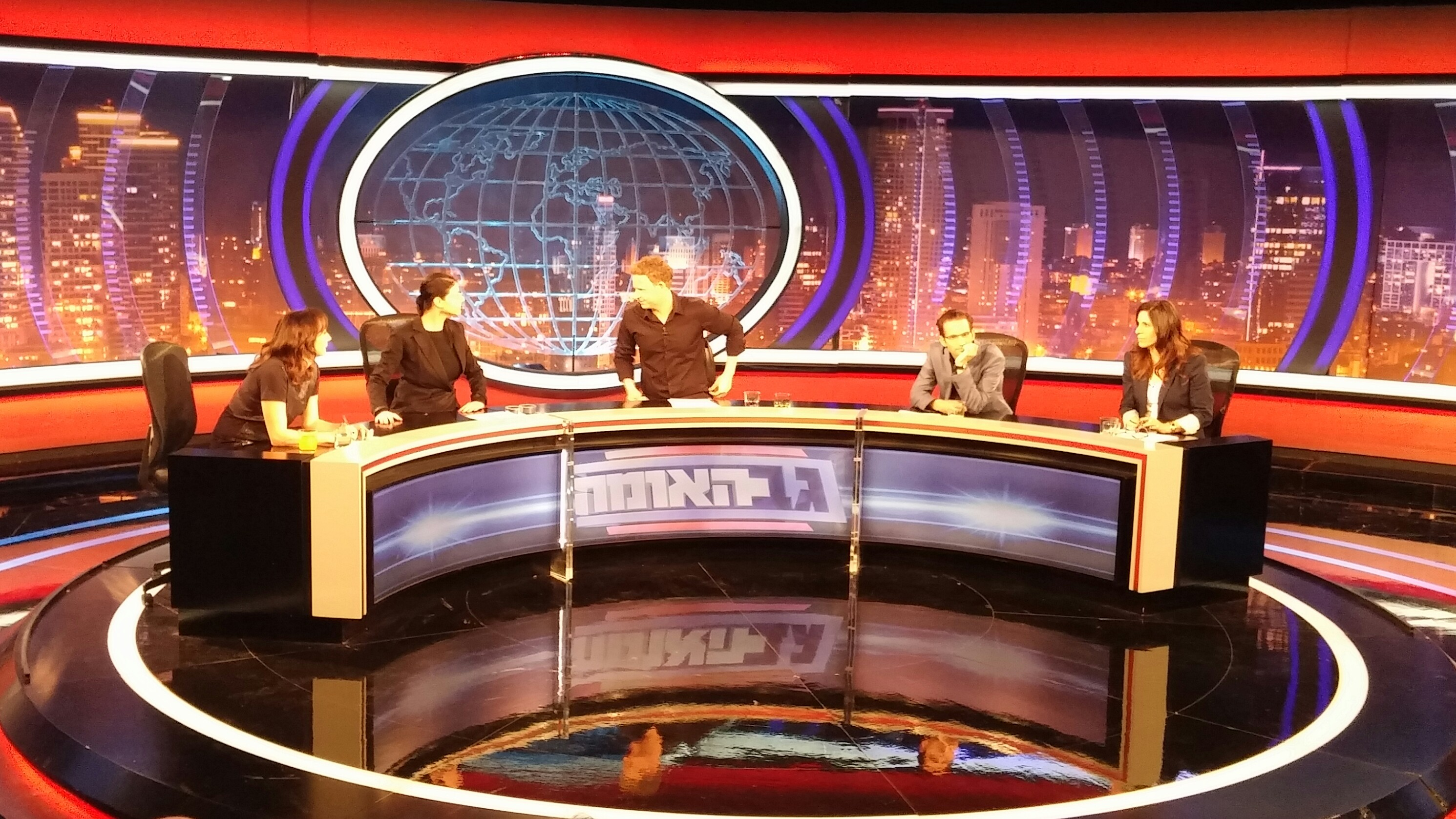
Schleien (center) hosts his partner MK Merav Michaeli (left), moderated the satirical television program Gav Hauma, 2015

== Personal life ==
He is the life partner of Merav Michaeli, a member of the Israeli parliament and former leader of the Israeli Labor Party. They have two children via surrogacy. He is an atheist.
