= 42nd NAACP Image Awards =

2010 media and literature awards

- Date: March 4, 2011
- Site: Shrine Auditorium, Los Angeles, California
- Hosted by: Holly Robinson Peete and Wayne Brady
- Official website: NAACPImageAwards.net

Highlights
- Best Picture: For Colored Girls
- Best Comedy Series: Tyler Perry's House of Payne
- Best Drama Series: Grey's Anatomy

Television coverage
- Network: Fox

The 42nd NAACP Image Awards, presented by the NAACP, honored outstanding representations and achievements of people of color in motion pictures, television, music, and literature during the 2010 calendar year. The ceremony was hosted by Holly Robinson Peete and Wayne Brady and aired on March 4, 2011, on Fox.

== Nominations ==
The nominations were announced on January 12, 2011, at the Paley Center for Media in Beverly Hills by Kimberly Elise, Sanaa Lathan, 50 Cent, Smokey Robinson, Columbus Short, Affion Crockett and awards chairman Clayola Brown. Tyler Perry earned 19 nominations across the film and television categories.

All nominees are listed below, with the winners listed first in boldface. No Vanguard or Hall of Fame awards were bestowed in this year.

== Special awards ==
President's Award	Chairman's Award
**Gen. Colin L. Powell**	**Regina M. Benjamin**

== Motion Picture ==
Outstanding Motion Picture	Outstanding Directing in a Motion Picture
**For Colored Girls**; Just Wright; The Book of Eli; The Kids Are All Right; Tyler Perry's Why Did I Get Married Too?	**Tyler Perry – For Colored Girls**; Geoffrey Sax – Frankie & Alice; George Tillman Jr. – Faster; Tanya Hamilton – Night Catches Us; The Hughes Brothers – The Book of Eli
Outstanding Actor in a Motion Picture	Outstanding Actress in a Motion Picture
**Denzel Washington – The Book of Eli**; Anthony Mackie – Night Catches Us; Common – Just Wright; Jaden Smith – The Karate Kid; Morgan Freeman – Red	**Halle Berry – Frankie & Alice**; Janet Jackson – Tyler Perry's Why Did I Get Married Too?; Kerry Washington – Night Catches Us; Queen Latifah – Just Wright; Zoe Saldana – The Losers
Outstanding Supporting Actor in a Motion Picture	Outstanding Supporting Actress in a Motion Picture
**Samuel L. Jackson – Mother and Child**; Don Cheadle – Brooklyn's Finest; Idris Elba – Takers; Justin Timberlake – The Social Network; Michael Ealy – For Colored Girls	**Kimberly Elise – For Colored Girls**; Anika Noni Rose – For Colored Girls; Phylicia Rashad – For Colored Girls; Jill Scott – Tyler Perry's Why Did I Get Married Too?; Whoopi Goldberg – For Colored Girls
Outstanding Foreign Motion Picture	Outstanding Independent Motion Picture
**Biutiful**; A Barefoot Dream; Four Lions; Mother; Outside the Law	**Frankie & Alice**; Conviction; La Mission; Mother and Child; Night Catches Us
Outstanding Writing in a Motion Picture (Theatrical or Television)
**Michael Elliot – Just Wright**; Mary King, Anna Waterhouse, Joe Shrapnel, Marko King, Jonathan Watters and Cheryl Edwards – Frankie & Alice; Michael C. Martin – Brooklyn's Finest; Rodrigo Garcia – Mother and Child; Tyler Perry – Tyler Perry's Why Did I Get Married Too?

== Television series and streaming ==
=== Drama ===
Outstanding Drama Series
**Grey's Anatomy**; Detroit 1-8-7; HawthoRNe; Law & Order: Special Victims Unit; Treme
Outstanding Actor in a Drama Series	Outstanding Actress in a Drama Series
**LL Cool J – NCIS: Los Angeles**; Anthony Anderson – Law & Order; Blair Underwood – The Event; Hill Harper – CSI: NY; Laurence Fishburne – CSI: Crime Scene Investigation	**Regina King – Southland**; Chandra Wilson – Grey's Anatomy; Gugu Mbatha-Raw – Undercovers; Jada Pinkett Smith – HawthoRNe; Wendy Davis – Army Wives
Outstanding Supporting Actor in a Drama Series	Outstanding Supporting Actress in a Drama Series
**Terrence Howard – Law & Order: Los Angeles**; Andre Braugher – Men of a Certain Age; Giancarlo Esposito – Breaking Bad; James Pickens Jr. – Grey's Anatomy; Nelsan Ellis – True Blood	**S. Epatha Merkerson – Law & Order**; Alfre Woodard – Memphis Beat; Sandra Oh – Grey's Anatomy; Sara Ramirez – Grey's Anatomy; Vanessa Bell Calloway – HawthoRNe
Outstanding Actor in a Daytime Drama Series	Outstanding Actress in a Daytime Drama Series
**Darnell Williams – All My Children**; Aaron D. Spears – The Bold and the Beautiful; Cornelius Smith Jr. – All My Children; Rodney Saulsberry – The Bold and the Beautiful	**Tatyana Ali – The Young and the Restless**; Debbi Morgan – All My Children; Julia Pace Mitchell – The Young and the Restless; Tonya Lee Williams – The Young and the Restless; Yvette Freeman – The Bold and the Beautiful
Outstanding Writing in a Drama Series	Outstanding Directing in a Drama Series
**Shonda Rhimes – Private Practice: "Did You Hear What Happened to Charlotte King?"**; Alexander Woo – True Blood: "It Hurts Me Too"; Janine Sherman Barrois – Criminal Minds: "Remembrance of Things Past"; Judith McCreary – Law & Order: Special Victims Unit: "Disabled"; Leyani Diaz and Vanessa Rojas – The Event: "Loyalty"	**Millicent Shelton – Men of a Certain Age: "Go with the Flow"**; Felix Alcala – Southland: "What Makes Sammy Run"; Paris Barclay – In Treatment: "Sunil: Week 6"; Seith Mann – Friday Night Lights: "Injury List"; Stephen L. Williams – Undercovers: "Instructions"

=== Comedy ===
Outstanding Comedy Series
**Tyler Perry's House of Payne**; 30 Rock; Are We There Yet?; Glee; Modern Family
Outstanding Actor in a Comedy Series	Outstanding Actress in a Comedy Series
**David Mann – Tyler Perry's Meet the Browns**; Dule Hill – Psych; LaVan Davis – Tyler Perry's House of Payne; Phil Morris – Love That Girl!; Terry Crews – Are We There Yet?	**Vanessa Williams – Desperate Housewives**; Cassi Davis – Tyler Perry's House of Payne; Essence Atkins – Are We There Yet?; Salli Richardson-Whitfield – Eureka; Tatyana Ali – Love That Girl!
Outstanding Supporting Actor in a Comedy Series	Outstanding Supporting Actress in a Comedy Series
**Ice Cube – Are We There Yet?**; Craig Robinson – The Office; Lamman Rucker – Tyler Perry's Meet the Browns; Lance Gross – Tyler Perry's House of Payne; Tracy Morgan – 30 Rock	**Sofia Vergara – Modern Family**; Amber Riley – Glee; Anna Deavere Smith – Nurse Jackie; Keshia Knight Pulliam – Tyler Perry's House of Payne; Viola Davis – United States of Tara
Outstanding Writing in a Comedy Series	Outstanding Directing in a Comedy Series
**Aaron McGruder – The Boondocks: "The Fund-Raiser"**; Daniel Chun – The Office: "Nepotism"; Kenny Smith – Pair of Kings: "Where the Wild Kings Are"; Myra J. – Tyler Perry's Meet the Browns: "Meet the Racist"; Vali Chandrasekaran – 30 Rock: "Khonani"	**Kevin Rodney Sullivan – Modern Family: "Game Changer"**; Joe Morton – Eureka: "Stoned"; Justin Lin – Community: "Modern Warfare"; Ken Whittingham – 30 Rock: "Anna Howard Shaw Day"; Michael Schultz – Chuck: "Chuck versus The Couch Lock"

=== Television movie, limited-series or dramatic special ===
Outstanding Television Movie, Mini-Series or Dramatic Special
**Sins of the Mother**; America: The Story of Us – "Part 4"; Filling the Gap; Luther; The Wronged Man
Outstanding Actor in a Television Movie, Mini-Series or Dramatic Special	Outstanding Actress in a Television Movie, Mini-Series or Dramatic Special
**Idris Elba – Luther**; Benito Martinez – Lies in Plain Sight; Jon Seda – The Pacific; Mahershalalhashbaz Ali – The Wronged Man; Michael Jai White – One Angry Juror	**Jill Scott – Sins of the Mother**; Lucy Liu – Marry Me; Rosie Perez – Lies in Plain Sight; Tamera Mowry – Double Wedding; Tia Mowry – Double Wedding

=== Other ===
Outstanding News/Information – Series or Special	Outstanding Talk (Series)
**Unsung**; A Conversation with President Obama; Anderson Cooper 360; The Judge Mathis Show; Washington Watch with Roland Martin	**The View**; Conversations with Ed Gordon; Larry King Live; The Mo'Nique Show; TV One on One with Cathy Hughes
Outstanding Reality Series	Outstanding Variety – Series or Special
**Sunday Best**; American Idol; America's Next Top Model; Dancing with the Stars; Extreme Makeover: Home Edition	**UNCF: An Evening of Stars – Tribute to Lionel Richie**; BET Honors 2010; Beyonce: I Am... World Tour; Black Girls Rock!; TV One Night Only: Live from the Essence Music Festival
Outstanding Children's Program	Outstanding Performance by a Youth (Series, Special, Television Movie or Limited-series)
**True Jackson, VP**; Brave New Voices 2010; Dora the Explorer; The Backyardigans; Wizards of Waverly Place	**Keke Palmer – True Jackson, VP**; Lance Robertson – Yo Gabba Gabba!: Baby; Nick Cannon – TeenNick Halo Awards 2010; Selena Gomez – Wizards of Waverly Place; Victoria Justice – Victorious
Outstanding Documentary (Theatrical or Television)	
**For Love of Liberty: The Story of America's Black Patriots**; Hugh Hefner: Playboy, Activist and Rebel; If God is Willing and the Creek Don't Rise; Waiting for Superman; William Kunstler: Disturbing the Universe	

== Recording ==
Outstanding Album	Outstanding New Artist
**Wake Up! –** **John Legend and The Roots**; My Beautiful Dark Twisted Fantasy – Kanye West; Now and Then – Smokey Robinson; Raymond vs. Raymond – Usher; Soldier of Love – Sade	**Willow**; B.o.B; Bruno Mars; Jason Derulo; Nicki Minaj
Outstanding Male Artist	Outstanding Female Artist
**Usher**; CeeLo Green; Jay-Z; Kanye West; Ne-Yo	**Mary J. Blige**; Chrisette Michele; Corinne Bailey Rae; Rihanna; Sade
Outstanding Song	Outstanding Duo, Group or Collaboration
**Bittersweet –** **Fantasia**; Fistful of Tears – Maxwell; Forget You – CeeLo Green; Soldier of Love – Sade; Un-thinkable (I'm Ready) – Alicia Keys	**John Legend and The Roots**; Diddy-Dirty Money; Eminem & Rihanna; Herbie Hancock (feat. India Arie, Chaka Khan and others); The Black Eyed Peas
Outstanding Music Video	Outstanding World Music Album
**Un-thinkable (I'm Ready) –** **Alicia Keys**; Fistful of Tears – Maxwell; Soldier of Love – Sade; Whip My Hair – Willow; Why Don't You Love Me – Beyonce Knowles	**VOCAbuLarieS** – **Bobby McFerrin**; Hymns for the Rebel Soul – Rocky Dawuni; Oyo – Angelique Kidjo; The Imagine Project – Herbie Hancock; The Sound of Sunshine – Michael Franti & Spearhead
Outstanding Gospel Album (Traditional or Contemporary)	Outstanding Jazz Album
**You Are Not Alone –** **Mavis Staples**; Gospel According to Jazz, Chapter III – Kirk Whalum; Here I Am – Marvin Sapp; Just Love Deluxe – Brian Courtney Wilson; The Master Plan – Tamela Mann	**From Billie Holiday to Edith Piaf: Live in Marciac –** **The Wynton Marsalis Quintet and Richard Galliano**; Eleanora Fagan (1915-1959): To Billie With Love From Dee Dee – Dee Dee Bridgewater; Geri Allen & Timeline Live – Geri Allen and Timeline; The Imagine Project – Herbie Hancock; VOCAbuLarieS – Bobby McFerrin

== Literature ==
Outstanding Literary Work – Fiction	Outstanding Literary Work – Nonfiction
**Getting to Happy –** **Terry McMillan**; A Taste of Honey – Jabari Asim; Glorious – Bernice L. McFadden; Till You Hear From Me – Pearl Cleage; Wench – Dolen Perkins-Valdez	**The New Jim Crow: Mass Incarceration in the Age of Colorblindness** **– Michelle Alexander**; Brainwashed: Challenging the Myth of Black Inferiority – Tom Burrell; Hands on the Freedom Plow: Personal Accounts of Women in SNCC – editors: Faith S. Holsaert, Judy Richardson, Martha Prescod Norman Noonan, Betty Garman Robinson, Jean Smith Young and Dorothy M. Zellner; Surviving and Thriving: 365 Facts in Black Economic History – Dr. Julianne Malveaux; The History of White People – Nell Irvin Painter
Outstanding Literary Work – Debut Author	Outstanding Literary Work – Biography/Auto-Biography
**The Warmth of Other Suns: The Epic Story of America's Great Migration** **– Isabel Wilkerson**; Wench – Dolen Perkins-Valdez; The Girl Who Fell from the Sky – Heidi W. Durrow; Beneath the Lion's Gaze – Maaza Mengiste; Forest Gate – Peter Akinti	**You Don't Know Me: Reflections of My Father, Ray Charles** **– Ray Charles Robinson Jr.**; Conversations with Myself – Ruth Hobday and Nelson Mandela; Decoded – Jay-Z; Extraordinary, Ordinary People – Condoleezza Rice; I'm Still Standing: From Captive U.S. Soldier to Free Citizen - My Journey Home – Shoshana Johnson
Outstanding Literary Work – Instructional	Outstanding Literary Work – Poetry
**A Boy Should Know How to Tie a Tie: And Other Lessons for Succeeding in Life –** **Antwone Fisher**; Diet-Free for Life: A Revolutionary Food, Fitness and Mindset Makeover to Maximize Fat Loss – Robert Ferguson; If it Takes a Village, Build One: How I Found Meaning Through a Life of Service and 100+ Ways You Can Too – Malaak Compton-Rock; The Blueprint: A Plan for Living Above Life's Storms – Kirk Franklin; The Little Black Book of Success: Laws of Leadership for Black Women – Elaine Meryl Brown, Rhonda McLean and Marsha Haygood	**100 Best African-American Poems** **– Nikki Giovanni**; Hard Times Require Furious Dancing – Alice Walker (Author), Shiloh McCloud (Illustrator); Holding Company – Major Jackson; Suck on the Marrow – Camille T. Dungy; White Egrets – Derek Walcott
Outstanding Literary Work – Children	Outstanding Literary Work – Youth/Teens
**My Brother Charlie –** **Holly Robinson Peete and Ryan Elizabeth Peete (Authors), Shane W. Evans (Illustrator)**; Grandma's Gift – Eric Velásquez; Mama Miti: Wangai Maathai and the Tree of Kenya – Donna Jo Napoli (Author), Kadir Nelson (Illustrator); Side by Side/Lado a Lado: The Story of Delores Huerta and Cesar Chavez – Monica Brown (Author), Joe Cepeda (Illustrator); The Great Migration: Journey to the North – Eloise Greenfield (Author), Jan Pivey Gilchrist (Illustrator)	**Condoleezza Rice A Memoir of My Extraordinary, Ordinary Family and Me –** **Condoleezza Rice**; Lockdown – Walter Dean Myers; Malcolm X: I Believe in the Brotherhood of Man, All Men – Jeff Burlingame; Out of My Mind – Sharon Draper; One Crazy Summer – Rita Williams-Garcia
