= Hold My Hand =

"Hold My Hand" may refer to:

== Film and television ==
- Hold My Hand (film), a 1938 British film directed by Thornton Freeland
- Hold My Hand (TV series), a 2013 South Korean soap opera

== Music ==
- "Hold My Hand" (Dave Davies song), 1969
- "Hold My Hand" (1953 song), by Jack Lawrence and Richard Myers
- "Hold My Hand" (Sean Paul song), 2009, featuring Keri Hilson
- "Hold My Hand" (Michael Jackson and Akon song), 2010
- "Hold My Hand" (Hootie & the Blowfish song), 1994
- "Hold My Hand" (Jess Glynne song), 2015
- "Hold My Hand" (Lady Gaga song), 2022
- "Hold My Hand", song from the musical Me and My Girl
- "Hold My Hand", a song by New Found Glory on their album Coming Home
- "Hold My Hand", a song by Maher Zain on his album Thank You Allah
- "Hold My Hand", a song by Beatles parody group the Rutles
- "Hold My Hand", a song by the Fray from Helios
- "Hold My Hand", a song by Lukas Graham from 3 (The Purple Album)
- "Hold My Hand", a song by Stray Kids from Hop

== See also ==
- Take My Hand (disambiguation)
