= Tererai Trent =

Zimbabwean-American woman (born c. 1965)

Tererai Trent (born c. 1965) is a Zimbabwean-American woman whose unlikely educational success has brought her international fame.

== Background and career ==
Trent was born in the village of Zvipani in Karoi District, Mashonaland West Province. She was not allowed to go to her local school, Matau Primary School, as a child due to poverty as well as being female, although her brother Tinashe, an indifferent student, was given the opportunity to attend. She later recalled the men in the village including her father "pointing to the boys in the village and saying 'These are the breadwinners of tomorrow. We need to educate them. We need to send them to school. The girls will get married.'" She taught herself to read and write from her brother's books, and eventually started doing her brother's homework. When her teacher discovered this (because the homework was done so much better than the work her brother did at school) he begged Trent's father to allow her to attend school. She then attended school for a short period, but her father accepted a brideprice of a cow and married her off young. She had three children by age 18 and without a high school diploma. Her husband beat her for wanting an education. In 1991, Jo Luck from Heifer International visited her village and asked every woman about her greatest dream. Trent said she wanted to go to America and get a bachelor's degree, a master's, and eventually a PhD. Encouraged by her mother, Trent wrote down these dreams, put the paper in a scrap of tin, and buried it.

In 1998, she moved to Oklahoma with her husband and their five children. Three years later, she earned a bachelor's degree in agricultural education. In 2003, Trent earned her master's degree, and her husband was deported for abuse. She has since remarried, to Mark Trent, a plant pathologist whom she met at Oklahoma State University. After she earned each degree, she returned to Zimbabwe, unearthed her tin and checked off each goal she accomplished, one by one. In December 2009, she earned her doctorate from Western Michigan University; her thesis looked at HIV/AIDS prevention programs for women and girls in sub-Saharan Africa.

Her life story was featured in the 2009 book Half the Sky by Nicholas Kristof and Sheryl WuDunn, and in an excerpt of that book published by The New York Times Magazine. Subsequently, Oprah Winfrey ran a segment on Tererai in the Oprah episode concerning the book Half the Sky. Oprah sent a crew with Trent back to Zimbabwe to dig up the piece of tin in which she had buried the paper with her goals. Since earning her PhD in 2009, Trent obtained a two-year commitment to work with Heifer International (which paid for her PhD). Also in 2009, she founded the Tinogona Foundation, later renamed Tererai Trent International, which has built several schools in Zimbabwe. In 2013, she received her master's degree in Public Health (Epidemiology) from the UC Berkeley School of Public Health.

In May 2011, Oprah Winfrey revealed that Trent was her all-time favorite guest, and donated $1.5 million so that Trent could build her own school in her old village in Zimbabwe. The school was completed in 2014. In 2015, Trent published a children's book about her own life, called The Girl who Buried her Dreams in a Can, illustrated by Jan Spivey Gilchrist. Her 2017 self-help book, The Awakened Woman: Remembering & Igniting Our Sacred Dreams, with a foreword by Oprah Winfrey, was named the Outstanding Literary Work, Instructional at the 49th NAACP Image Awards. She has been an adjunct professor in Monitoring & Evaluation in Global Health at Drexel University since 2013.
