= Jan Spivey Gilchrist =

American writer (born 1949)

- Born: Jan Spivey; February 15, 1949 (age 77); Chicago, Illinois, United States
- Education: Eastern Illinois University, University of Northern Iowa, Vermont College, Madison University
- Occupations: Author, illustrator, fine artist, teacher
- Spouse: Kevin Gilchrist
- Children: RJ and William Kelvin
- Writing career
- Language: English
- Years active: 1973–present
- Website: janspiveygilchrist.com

Jan Spivey Gilchrist is an American author, illustrator, and fine artist from Chicago, Illinois. She is most well known for her work in children's literature, especially illustrations in The Great Migration: Journey to the North, Nathaniel Talking, and My America. Her books have received numerous awards including the Coretta Scott King Medal for Illustration and the Parents' Choice Award.

== Early life ==
Jan Spivey Gilchrist was born February 15, 1949, in Chicago, Illinois, to Charles and Arthric Spivey. Gilchrist first began drawing as a young girl when she suffered from a debilitating bone disease, which prevented her from physical activities. Charles Spivey, a minister, encouraged his daughter's love of art at a young age and together, they would travel from their South Side neighborhood to visit the Art Institute of Chicago. Once there, Gilchrist longed to see art created by and featuring African-Americans. Young Gilchrist was devastated by the lack of such a section. Looking back, she recounts "So I decided to change everything. I was going to make sure that African Americans were in paintings and books." With her passion for art and practical advice from her father to find a more stable profession, Gilchrist enrolled at Eastern Illinois University. She studied with the hopes of teaching and graduated with a Bachelor of Science in art education in 1973. After graduation, she worked for several years as a substitute teacher and later, as an art teacher with various public school systems including the Chicago Board of Education (1973–1976), Harvey Schools (1976–1979), Cambridge School Department (1980–1981), and Joliet Public Schools (1982–1983). During her time teaching, Gilchrist enrolled at the University of Northern Iowa, eventually graduating with a Master of Art in Painting in 1979. She also holds an M.F.A. in writing from Vermont College and a Ph.D. in English from Madison University.

During her undergraduate program, Gilchrist married Arthur Johnson on August 1, 1970. They had one daughter. Gilchrist and Johnson divorced in August 1980. Gilchrist married Kelvin Keith Gilchrist on September 5, 1983. They had one son.

== Career ==
Throughout her teaching career, Gilchrist continued to paint and exhibit her work. Eventually, she made the acquaintance of Eloise Greenfield, a published author of African American children's literature. Impressed by her depiction of normal African American families, Gilchrist gifted Greenfield slides of her work and a picture of herself. Greenfield suggested, after seeing Gilchrist's work, that she should become an illustrator. Soon after, Gilchrist met with editors at Philomel Books, a New York-based publishing house, to work as an illustrator.

Gilchrist has since worked with three generations of Greenfield's family. Gilchrist's first published book was 1988's Children of Long Ago, written by Greenfield's mother Lessie Blanche (née Jones) Little. Greenfield & Gilchrist published their first collaboration, the book Nathaniel Talking, in 1989. They have published 27 works together to date. Greenfield credits their productive and prolific working relationship to the mutual respect they have for each other's work and artistic processes. Gilchrist has also collaborated on two books, The Baby (1994) and Waiting for Christmas (1996) with Greenfield's daughter Monica Greenfield.

Since her first publication, Gilchrist has worked on 73 other children's books. Though she has primarily worked as an illustrator for other authors, Gilchrist has written and self-illustrated several books. Her first authored book, Indigo and Moonlight Gold, captured a young African American girl's realization of the passage of time. It was published in 1993. Her second, Madelia, published in 1997, tells the story of a young African American girl who would rather get lost in her painting than attend her father's sermons in church.

She continues to write and illustrate children's books from her home near Chicago, Illinois.

== Illustration style ==
Gilchrist works in a variety of mediums, including watercolor, mixed-media collage, gouache, pastels and pencil. Many of the books she has worked on focus on the African-American experience over time and depict a diverse range of people, such as slaves in the United States, modern-day children participating in everyday activities, and well-known figures such as Barack Obama and Michael Jordan.

In Nathaniel Talking, Gilchrist used large charcoal drawings to illustrate and romanticize the moods and happenings of the eponymous character, Nathaniel. Gilchrist's soft charcoal illustrations are also seen in Children of Long Ago. Gilchrist has also used collage to great success in The Great Migration: Journey to the North where portraits of travelers are interspersed with photographs, newspaper headlines, maps, and small painted vignettes. Watercolor images were used in The Girl Who Buried Her Dreams in a Can, an autobiographical account of a girl's journey to education in rural Zimbabwe.

Gilchrist's collaborator, Eloise Greenfield, has described Gilchrist's style as thoroughly emotional with particular attention paid to the expressive nature of her character's eyes. Gilchrist has consistently used human models to realistically portray these characters and the often, everyday occurrences of their lives.

== Legacy and awards ==
Gilchrist is a prolific artist and illustrator in a variety of mediums, with praise given to her works in watercolor, pen, marker, pencil, gouache, and oil. Her art is included in permanent collections at the Du Sable Museum of African American History, the Isobel Neal Gallery, the Evanston Art Center Coop Gallery, and the Southside Community Art Center. Her work is also held in the de Grummond Collection at the University of Southern Mississippi and the Kerlan Collections of the University of Minnesota. Exhibitions of her work have been held at the Anacostia Museum of the Smithsonian Museums, the King-Tisdell Foundation Museum, the Art Institute of Chicago, the St. Louis Museum of Art, the Museum of the National Center of African American Artists, and the Ward-Nasse Gallery.

She received the 1990 Coretta Scott King Award for her illustrations in Nathaniel Talking (cowritten with Eloise Greenfield), and their collaboration on Night on Neighborhood Street earned Gilchrist a Coretta Scott King Illustrator Honor award in 1992 and was also selected as a Reading Rainbow Book. Gilchrist received the Zora Neale Hurston Award from the National Association of Black Storytellers in 2014. Her work has also been recognized by the Cooperative Children's Book Center (CCBC) at the University of Wisconsin, the National Association for the Advancement of Colored People (NAACP), and Parents' Choice. Her body of work led to her induction into the Society of Illustrators in 2001 and the International Literary Hall of Fame for Writers of African Descent in 1999.

== List of works ==
=== Author and illustrator ===
- Indigo and Moonlight Gold (1993) ISBN 9780863162107
- Madelia (1997) ISBN 9780803720527
- My America (2007) ISBN 9780060791049
- Obama: The Day the World Danced (2010) ISBN 9780982409503
- A Voice As Soft as a Honeybee's Flutter: Inspired by Psalm 46 (2019) ISBN 9781627079365
- You See Me, God: Inspired by Psalm 139 (2020) ISBN 9781627079389

=== Illustrator only ===
- Children of Long Ago (by Lessie Jones Little, 1988) ISBN 9780613997805
- Nathaniel Talking (by Eloise Greenfield, 1989) ISBN 9780863162008
- Night on Neighborhood Street (by Eloise Greenfield, 1991) ISBN 9780140556834
- Lisa's Daddy & Daughter Day (by Eloise Greenfield, 1991) ISBN 9780887419195
- Daddy And I (by Eloise Greenfield, 1991) ISBN 9780863162060
- Big Friend, Little Friend (by Eloise Greenfield, 1991) ISBN 9780863162046
- I Make Music (by Eloise Greenfield, 1991) ISBN 9780863162053
- My Doll Keshia (by Eloise Greenfield, 1991) ISBN 978-0863162039
- Red Dog Blue Fly: Football Poems (by Sharon Bell Mathis, 1991) ISBN 9780140543377
- Everett Anderson's Christmas Is Coming (by Lucille Clifton, 1993) ISBN 9780785720911
- First Pink Light (by Eloise Greenfield. Gilchrist illustrated the 1993 reprint but not the original 1976 edition) ISBN 9780863162121
- Aaron & Gayla's Counting Book (by Eloise Greenfield, 1993) ISBN 9780863162244
- William and the Good Old Days (by Eloise Greenfield, 1993) ISBN 9780060210939
- Aaron & Gayla's Alphabet Book (by Eloise Greenfield, 1993) ISBN 9780863162138
- The Baby (by Monica Greenfield, 1994) ISBN 9780694005772
- Lift Ev'ry Voice and Sing (by James Weldon Johnson, 1995) ISBN 978-0-590-46982-1
- Recycling Dump (by Andrea Butler, 1995) ISBN 9780673362674
- Sharing Danny's Dad (by Angela Shelf Medearis, 1995) ISBN 9780673362759
- Waiting for Christmas (by Monica Greenfield, 1996) ISBN 9780590527002
- For the Love of the Game: Michael Jordan and Me (by Eloise Greenfield, 1997) ISBN 9780064435550
- Singing Down the Rain (by Joy Cowley, 1997) ISBN 9780060276027
- Kia Tanisha (by Eloise Greenfield, 1997) ISBN 9780694008476
- Kia Tanisha Drives Her Car (by Eloise Greenfield, 1997) ISBN 9780694008483
- Lemonade Sun and Other Poems (by Rebecca Kai Dotlich, 1998) ISBN 9780606207607
- Easter Parade (by Eloise Greenfield, 1998) ISBN 9780786822713
- Water, Water (by Eloise Greenfield, 1999) ISBN 9780694012473
- Angels (by Eloise Greenfield, 1998) ISBN 9780786804429
- Sweet Baby Coming (by Eloise Greenfield, 2000) ISBN 9780694005789
- I Can Draw A Weeposaur and Other Dinosaurs (by Eloise Greenfield, 2001) ISBN 9780688176341
- Mimi's Tutu (by Tynia Thomassie, 2002) ISBN 9780590440219
- How They Got Over: African Americans and the Call of the Sea (by Eloise Greenfield, 2002) ISBN 9780060289911
- Honey I Love (by Eloise Greenfield. Gilchrist illustrated the 2003 edition, the original was published in 1978 as an unillustrated poem, 2003) ISBN 9780060091248
- In The Land of Words (by Eloise Greenfield, 2003) ISBN 9780060289935
- Me & Neesie (by Eloise Greenfield. Gilchrist illustrated the 30th anniversary edition in 2004 but not the original 1975 edition) ISBN 9780060007010
- A Friend From Galilee (by Dandi Daley Mackall, 2004) ISBN 9780806645865
- Christmas Soup (by Alice Faye Duncan and Phyllis Dooley, 2005) ISBN 9780310709305
- When the Horses Ride By: Children in the Times of War (by Eloise Greenfield, 2006) ISBN 9781584302490
- The Friendly Four (by Eloise Greenfield, 2006) ISBN 9780060007591
- Brothers Sisters: Family Poems (by Eloise Greenfield, 2008) ISBN 9780060562847
- Yafi's Family: An Ethiopian Boy's Journey of Love, Loss, and Adoption (by Linda Pettitt, 2010) ISBN 9780979748141
- The Great Migration (by Eloise Greenfield, 2010) ISBN 9780061259210
- Secrets of the Seven Stars: Elly's Awakening (by Kelley Powell Barcellona, 2014) ISBN 9780615828350
- My God Is Awesome (by Kyla McKenzie & Monique McKenzie, 2014) ISBN 9781502542854
- The Girl Who Buried Her Dream in a Can (by Terarai Trent, 2015) ISBN 9780670016549
- One Last Word: Wisdom from the Harlem Renaissance (by Nikki Grimes, Cozbi A. Cabrera, R. Gregory Christie, Pat Cummings, Ebony Glenn, E. B. Lewis, and Frank Morrison, 2017) ISBN 9781619635548
- We Are Shining (by Gwendolyn Brooks, 2017) ISBN 9780062570666
- The Thumbtack Dancer (by Leslie Tyron, 2017) ISBN 9780997772005
- The Boss: Entrepreneurship for Kids (by Robert D. Blackwell Sr., 2018) ISBN 9781480863446
- Kringle's Christmas (by Savy Leiser, 2018) ISBN 9780999161456
