= The Hundred Penny Box =

1975 children's book

- Author: Sharon Bell Mathis
- Illustrator: Leo and Diane Dillon
- Language: English
- Genre: Children's literature
- Publisher: Viking Press / Puffin
- Publication date: 1975
- Publication place: United States
- Media type: Hardback (Viking) / Paperback (Puffin)

The Hundred Penny Box is a 1975 children's novel about a young boy, his great-great-aunt, and the box she uses to store 100 pennies, each penny representing a year of her life. It was written by Sharon Bell Mathis and illustrated by the duo Leo and Diane Dillon. The book was a Newbery Honor book in 1976.
