= Childtimes =

1979 book by Eloise Greenfield and Lessie Jones

Childtimes: A Three-Generation Memoir
- Author: Eloise Greenfield, Lessie Jones Little, Pattie Ridley Jones
- Illustrator: Jerry Pinkney
- Language: English
- Genre: Children's literature, U.S history, Memoir
- Published: 1979 (Crowell)
- Publication place: United States
- Media type: Print (hardback)
- Pages: 175
- ISBN: 9780690038743
- OCLC: 5265308

Childtimes: A Three-Generation Memoir is a 1979 book by children's author Eloise Greenfield, her mother Lessie Jones Little and her grandmother Pattie Ridley Jones that contains the three authors' remembrances of their childhoods from the late 19th century through the 20th century:

== Reception ==
The Horn Book Magazine, in a discussion of school-age memoirs, wrote of Childtimes, "Readers experience the accumulated joys and sorrows of one family’s history ... Illustrations by Jerry Pinkney, along with period photographs, enhance the stories’ emotional and historical relevance for middle graders." The Washington Post recommended Childtimes "for all parents who wish to present to their children the very best in literature."

It has also been reviewed by Publishers Weekly, School Library Journal, and Hurricane Alice magazine.

== Awards ==
- 1980 Boston Globe–Horn Nonfiction Book Award – honor
- 1980 Coretta Scott King Award author – honor
