= Eloise Greenfield =

American writer (1929–2021)

Eloise Greenfield in 2018

Eloise Greenfield (May 17, 1929 – August 5, 2021) was an American children's book and biography author and poet famous for her descriptive, rhythmic style and positive portrayal of the African-American experience.

After college, Greenfield began writing poetry and songs in the 1950s while working in a civil service job. In 1962, after years of submitting her work, her first poem was finally accepted for publication. In 1972, she published the first of her 48 children's books, including picture books, novels, poetry and biographies. She focused her work on realistic but positive portrayals of African-American communities, families and friendships. She also worked to encourage the writing and publishing of African-American literature and taught creative writing.

== Biography ==
Greenfield was born Eloise Little in Parmele, North Carolina, and grew up in Washington, D.C., during the Great Depression in the Langston Terrace housing project, which provided a warm childhood experience for her. She was the second oldest of five children of Weston W. Little and his wife Lessie Blanche (née Jones) Little (1906–1986). A shy and studious child, she loved music and took piano lessons. Greenfield experienced racism first-hand in the segregated southern U.S., especially when she visited her grandparents in North Carolina and Virginia. She graduated from Cardozo Senior High School in 1946 and attended Miner Teachers College (now known as University of the District of Columbia) until 1949. In her third year, however, she realized that she was too shy to be a teacher and dropped out.

Greenfield began work in the civil service at the U.S. Patent Office, where she soon became bored and also experienced racial discrimination. She began writing poetry and song lyrics in the 1950s while working at the Patent Office, finally succeeding in getting her first poem, "To a Violin", published in the Hartford Times in 1962 after many years of writing and submitting poetry and stories. She resigned from the Patent Office in 1960 to spend more time with her children and took temporary jobs. She continued to write, publishing some of her work in magazines during the 1960s. After joining the District of Columbia Black Writers Workshop in 1971, Greenfield began to write books for children. She published her first children’s book, Bubbles, in 1972, and after Sharon Bell Mathis encouraged her to write a picture book biography, she published Rosa Parks in 1973. Speaking engagements in connection with that topic helped her to overcome her fear of public speaking. Greenfield went on to publish 48 children's books, including picture books, novels, poetry and biographies. She said that she sought to "choose and order words that children will celebrate".

Dismayed by the depiction of blacks and black communities in popular media, Greenfield focused her work on realistic but positive portrayals of African-American communities, families and friendships. These relationships are emphasized in Sister (1974), where a young girl copes with the death of a parent with the help of other family members; Me and Nessie (1975), about best friends; My Daddy and I (1991); and Big Friend, Little Friend (1991), about mentoring. Her first book, Bubbles (1972), "sets the tone for much of Greenfield's later work: Realistic portrayals of loving African American parents working hard to provide for their families, and the children who face life's challenges with a positive outlook." In She Come Bringing Me that Little Baby Girl (1974), a boy deals with feelings of envy and learns to share his parents' love when his baby sister arrives. The poignant Alesia (1981) concerns the bravery of a girl handicapped by a childhood accident. Night on Neighborhood Street (1991) is a collection of poems depicting everyday life in an urban community. One of her best-known books, Honey, I Love, first published in 1978, is a collection of poems for people of all ages concerning the daily lives and loving relationships of children and families. Jonda McNair calls the collection a classic with themes relevant to diverse readers. Her semi-autobiographical book Childtimes: A Three-Generation Memoir (1979), co-written with her mother, describes her happy childhood in a neighborhood with strong positive relationships. In the introduction to that book, she explained her interest in biography:

People are a part of their time. They are affected, during the time that they live, by the things that happen in their world. Big things and small things. A war, an invention such as radio or television, a birthday party, a kiss. All of these help to shape the present and the future. If we could know more about our ancestors, about the experiences they had when they were children, and after they had grown up, too, we would know much more about what has shaped us and our world.

In 1971, Greenfield began work for the District of Columbia Black Writers' Workshop, as co-director of adult fiction and then, in 1973, as director of children's literature. That group's goal was to encourage the writing and publishing of African-American literature. She was writer-in-residence at the District of Columbia Commission on the Arts and Humanities in 1985–86 and taught creative writing in schools under grants from the Commission. She also lectured and gave free workshops on writing of African-American children's literature. She was a member of the National Literary Hall of Fame for Writers of African Descent and a member of the African-American Writers Guild. After 1991, most of Greenfield's books were illustrated by Jan Spivey Gilchrist. In later years, Greenfield experienced sight and hearing loss, but she continued speaking and publishing books with the help of her daughter. The Ezra Jack Keats Foundation wrote that Greenfield "broadened the path toward a more diverse American literature for children."

== Awards and honors ==
Among Greenfield's accolades is the Women's International League for Peace and Freedom in 1976. Her book Childtimes received a Boston Globe-Horn Book Award. Her body of work was recognized by the National Black Child Developmental Institute in 1981. In 1983, Greenfield won the Washington, DC Mayor's Art Award in Literature and the Jane Addams Children's Book Award. In 1990 she received a Recognition of Merit Award from the George G. Stone Center for Children's Books in Claremont, California. She won the Award for Excellence in Poetry for Children, given by the National Council of Teachers of English. She also received a lifetime achievement citation from the Ninth Annual Celebration of Black Writing, Philadelphia, PA, 1993; the Milner Award; the Hope S. Dean Award from the Foundation for Children's Literature; the American Library Association Notable Book citation; and the National Black Child Development Institute Award, among others.

In 2013, Greenfield received the Living Legacy Award from the Association for the Study of African American Life and History. She won a Coretta Scott King Award for her 1976 book Africa Dream, the 2018 Coretta Scott King–Virginia Hamilton Award for Lifetime Achievement, and Coretta Scott King honors for The Great Migration: Journey to the North, Night on Neighborhood Street, Nathaniel Talking, Childtimes, Mary McCleod Bethune and Paul Robeson. She also won a Hurston/Wright Foundation North Star Award for lifetime achievement. When Greenfield accepted the Teaching for Change Education for Liberation Award in 2016, she said:

Our work is [continued] so that children can see themselves in books, see their beauty and intelligence, see the strengths they have inherited from a long line of predecessors, see their ability to overcome difficulties, challenges, pain, and find deep joy and laughter in books, in characters they recognize as themselves.

== Personal life ==
Greenfield lived in Washington, D.C. from an early age and throughout her adult life. In 1950, she married World War II veteran Robert J. Greenfield, a long-time friend. The couple had a son, Steven (born 1951), and a daughter, Monica. They later divorced. Greenfield loved music and played the piano.

Greenfield died of a stroke at the age of 92 on August 5, 2021.

== Selected works ==
Fiction

- Bubbles (1972, illustrated by Eric Marlow, later reprinted as Good News)
- She Comes Bringing Me that Little Baby Girl (1974, illustrated by John Steptoe; winner of the Irma Simonton Black Award, Bank Street College of Education)
- Sister (1974, illustrated by Moneta Barnett; winner of The New York Times Outstanding Book of the Year citation)
- Me and Neesie (1975, illustrated by Moneta Barnett)
- First Pink Light (1976, illustrated by Barnett)
- Africa Dream (1976, illustrated by Carole Byard; Coretta Scott King Award winner)
- I Can Do It by Myself (1978, with her mother, Lessie Jones Little, illustrated by Byard)
- Talk About a Family (1978, illustrated by James Calvin)
- Darlene (1980, illustrated by George Ford)
- Grandmama's Joy (1980, illustrated by Byard)
- Grandpa's Face (1988, illustrated by Floyd Cooper)
- Big Friend, Little Friend (1991, illustrated by Jan Spivey Gilchrist)
- I Make Music (1991, illustrated by Gilchrist)
- Lisa's Daddy and Daughter Day (1991, illustrated by Gilchrist)
- My Doll, Keshia (1991, illustrated by Gilchrist)
- My Daddy and I (1991, illustrated by Gilchrist)
- Koya DeLaney and the Good Girl Blues (1992)
- Aaron and Gayla's Alphabet Book (1993, illustrated by Gilchrist)
- William and the Good Old Days (1993, illustrated by Gilchrist)
- Sweet Baby Coming (1994, illustrated by Gilchrist)
- Honey, I Love (1995 picture book, illustrated by Gilchrist)
- On My Horse (1995, illustrated by Gilchrist)
- Easter Parade (1998, illustrated by Gilchrist)
- Water, Water (1999)
- MJ and Me (1999)
- Grandma's Joy (1999)
- The Friendly Four (2006, illustrated by Gilchrist)
- Thinker: my puppy poet and me (2019, illustrated by Ehsan Abdollahi)
- Alaina and the Great Play (2021, illustrated by Colin Bootman)

Biographies and non-fiction

- Rosa Parks (1973, illustrated by Eric Marlow; winner of the 1974 Carter G. Woodson Book Award from the National Council for the Social Studies)
- Paul Robeson (1975, illustrated by Ford; winner of the 1976 Jane Addams Children's Book Award; Coretta Scott King Honor)
- Mary McLeod Bethune (1977, illustrated by Pinkney; Coretta Scott King Honor)
- Childtimes: A Three-Generation Memoir (1979, with her mother, L. J. Little, illustrated by Jerry Pinkney; Coretta Scott King Honor; Boston Globe-Horn Book Award)
- Alesia (1981, with Alesia Revis, illustrated by Ford, with photographs by Sandra Turner Bond)
- For the Love of the Game: Michael Jordan and Me (1997, illustrated by Gilchrist)
- How They Got Over: African Americans and the Call of the Sea (2003, illustrated by Gilchrist)
- The Women Who Caught the Babies: A Story of African American Midwives (2019, illustrated by Daniel Minter)

Poetry

- Honey, I Love and Other Poems (1978, illustrated by Leo and Diane Dillon; winner of the Recognition of Merit Award)
- Daydreamers (1981, illustrated by Tom Feeling)
- Nathaniel Talking (1988, illustrated by Gilchrist; Coretta Scott King Honor)
- Under the Sunday Tree (1988, illustrated by Amos Ferguson)
- Night on Neighborhood Street (1991, illustrated by Gilchrist; Coretta Scott King Honor)
- Angels (1998, illustrated by Gilchrist)
- I Can Draw a Weeposaur and Other Dinosaurs (2001, illustrated by Gilchrist)
- In the Land of Words (2004, illustrated by Gilchrist)
- When the horses ride by: Children in the times of war (2006, illustrated by Gilchrist)
- Brothers & Sisters (2008, illustrated by Gilchrist)
- The Great Migration: Journey to the North (2011, illustrated by Gilchrist; Coretta Scott King Honor)
