= Take My Hand =

Take My Hand may refer to:

== Songs ==
- "Take My Hand" (5 Seconds of Summer song), 2022
- "Take My Hand" (Dido song), 1999; covered by Jurgen Vries, 2004
- "Take My Hand", by Callalily from Destination XYZ, 2006
- "Take My Hand", by Charli XCX from True Romance, 2013
- "Take My Hand", by Hatchie from Giving the World Away, 2022
- "Take My Hand", by Lastlings, 2020
- "Take My Hand", by Matt Berry from Witchazel, 2009
- "Take My Hand", by Moloko from the single "Forever More", 2003
- "Take My Hand", by Simple Plan from Simple Plan, 2008
- "Take My Hand", by Zerobaseone from Melting Point, 2023

== Other uses ==
- Take My Hand World Tour, a 2022 concert tour by 5 Seconds of Summer
- "Take My Hand" (The Good Doctor), a 2019 TV episode
- Take My Hand, a 2022 novel by Dolen Perkins-Valdez

== See also ==
- Hold My Hand (disambiguation)
