= Wench: A Novel =

2010 debut novel of Dolen Perkins-Valdez

- Author: Dolen Perkins-Valdez
- Language: English
- Genre: Literary fiction, historical fiction
- Publisher: Amistad, a subsidiary of HarperCollins
- Publication date: 2010
- Publication place: United States
- Media type: Print (hardcover) • ebook
- ISBN: 9780061706547 (hardcover 1st ed.)
- OCLC: 419859746
- Dewey Decimal: 813/.6
- LC Class: PS3616.E7484 W46 2010

Wench: A Novel is the 2010 debut novel of American author Dolen Perkins-Valdez. It explores the lives of four young, enslaved women of color, who are mistresses of their wealthy white masters, men of the South, and who spend summers at Tawawa House, a resort in the free state of Ohio. There the women share their reactions to their lives and seeing a free society and free people of color.

== Background ==
Perkins-Valdez said that she was inspired to write the novel after coming across a brief reference to this resort, as part of the history of Wilberforce University, when reading a biography of W. E. B. Du Bois. Among the resort's summer visitors were wealthy white Southern planters with their enslaved mistresses of color, and sometimes their mixed-race children. These interracial couples generally stayed in the cottages rather than the main hotel of the resort, which was used primarily by white visitors. She was intrigued by this little-known history.

After the resort closed in the 1850s, it was purchased as the first campus of Wilberforce University, a historically black college founded in a collaboration between the Cincinnati Conference of the Methodist Church and the AME Church. During the Civil War, the AME Church took over sole ownership and operation of the college.

== Plot ==
Lizzie, a young enslaved African-American woman in the 1850s, is taken by her Southern white master Nathan Drayle for summers at Tawawa House in southwestern Ohio, a resort near what were also called Yellow Springs, iron-rich waters. Away from his Tennessee plantation, there she and her master can live as partners, and she believes they love each other. She has borne two of his children, who are mixed-race and considered slaves. His wife has not had any children. Over a few summers, she meets and befriends three other enslaved women of color who are also concubines of white planters. The characters explore different facets of their experiences and relationships with their masters, and the inner life of Drayle is also explored.

These interracial couples and their arrangements scandalized some of the whites in the area, particularly abolitionists. The young enslaved women also see free people of color in the area, and some begin to imagine their own freedom.

== Reception ==
Wench earned positive reviews. Samantha Nelson of The A.V. Club said that the debut novel seemed to progress in its sections to express a fuller account of its characters, including Lizzie's master Nathan Drayle, after a reliance on stereotypes about slavery in the opening section.

Lonnie O'Neal Parker of The Washington Post said the novel "raises questions about complex parts of slavery that are less explored for lack of written accounts: What kinds of accommodations and negotiations took place between slaves and masters? What passed for love? The novel looks at what history gets privileged and what gets forgotten."

The novel was selected by NPR in December 2010 as one of best five books published that year and recommended to book clubs, for "something to talk about".

It won the First Novelist Award by the Black Caucus of the American Library Association in 2011.

In 2011, the novel was also chosen as a finalist for two NAACP Image Awards and for the Hurston/Wright Legacy Award for fiction. Its paperback edition, published in 2011, became a New York Times Bestseller.
