= Dolen Perkins-Valdez =

American writer

- Education: Harvard College (BA); George Washington University (PhD)
- Occupation: Novelist
- Writing career
- Language: English
- Genre: Novel
- Notable works: Take My Hand (2022); Happy Land (2025)
- Website: dolenperkinsvaldez.com

Dolen Perkins-Valdez is an American novelist and essayist, best known for Wench: A Novel (2010), Balm (2015), Take My Hand (2022), and Happy Land (2025).

She is an emeritus board member of the PEN/Faulkner Foundation.

== Early life and education ==
Dolen Perkins-Valdez attended Harvard College as an undergraduate, earning a Bachelor of Arts degree. While at Harvard, she wrote articles for The Harvard Crimson. She completed a PhD in English at George Washington University in Washington, D.C. Her dissertation was titled "Mob Stories: Race, Nation and Narratives of Racial Violence."

== Career ==
Perkins-Valdez has published short fiction and essays in magazines including The Kenyon Review, StoryQuarterly, StorySouth, African American Review, PMS: PoemMemoirStory, North Carolina Literary Review, Richard Wright Newsletter, and SLI: Studies in Literary Imagination.

=== Wench: A Novel ===
Perkins-Valdez has said she was inspired to write her debut novel, Wench: A Novel (2010), after reading a biography of W. E. B. Du Bois and coming across a brief reference to the founding of Wilberforce University. The university was noted as having been built on the former grounds of a privately owned resort called Tawawa House, which hosted Southern white plantation owners and their enslaved Black mistresses as regular summer visitors in the antebellum period. Wench centers the character of Lizzie, a young enslaved woman, and her complicated relationship with her master. It also explores the lives of three other mistresses of color, whom Lizzie comes to know at the resort. They are influenced by spending time in a free state and seeing free people of color. The book was published by HarperCollins in 2010 and in paperback the following year. The book received positive reviews. The paperback edition became a bestseller.

=== Other works ===
In 2013, Perkins-Valdez published an introductory essay to the 37th edition of Solomon Northup's autobiography Twelve Years a Slave.

Her second novel, Balm, was published in May 2015. The novel is set in Chicago during the Reconstruction era. Perkins-Valdez said that she wanted to place the story "somewhere that was absolutely affected by the war but was still, in some ways, peripheral."

Dolen's third novel Take My Hand was published by Berkley Books/Penguin Random House in spring 2022. According to its epilogue, it was inspired by a real case in which two sisters, aged 12 and 14, were sterilized against their will in June 1973.. Take My Hand received a 2023 NAACP Image Award.

Her fourth novel Happy Land, published in 2025, received the 2026 Southern Book Prize for Fiction.

== Honors ==
- 2026 Southern Book Prize for Fiction
- 2026 BCALA Award for Fiction
- 2023 American Bar Association Silver Gavel Award for Drama and Literature
- 2023 NAACP Image Award for Outstanding Literary Work-Fiction.
- 2002–2003, president's postdoctoral fellow at the Center for African American Studies at the University of California, Los Angeles.
- 2009, finalist for the Robert Olen Butler Prize.
- 2011, finalist for two NAACP Image Awards and the Hurston/Wright Legacy Award for fiction, for her novel Wench
- 2011, First Novelist Award for Wench by the Black Caucus of the American Library Association.
- DC Commission on the Arts and Humanities Grant to aid in completion of her second novel, Balm.

== Bibliography ==
- —— (2010). Wench: A Novel (hardcover 1st ed.). New York: HarperCollins. ISBN 9780061706547.
- —— (2015). Balm: A Novel (hardcover 1st ed.). New York: HarperCollins. ISBN 9780062318657.
- —— (2022). Take My Hand (hardcover 1st ed.). New York: Berkley Books. ISBN 9780593337691.
- —— (2025). Happy Land (hardcover 1st ed.). New York: Berkley Books. ISBN 978-0593337721.
