= Martha Prescod Norman Noonan =

Civil rights activist

Martha Prescod Norman Noonan was a civil rights activist who is known for her work within the Student Non-Violent Coordinating Committee (SNCC) and co-editing a 2012 book Hands on the Freedom Plow: Personal Accounts by Women in SNCC.

== Early life and education ==
Noonan was born on February 25, 1945 in Providence, Rhode Island where she was raised as one of the only black students at the predominantly white institutions she attended. Her parents were active in the Progressive Party, and her father was once the state chairman of the party. She graduated from the University of Michigan in December 1964, and has a master's degree from Wayne State University where she studied history. Noonan completed coursework for a PhD at the University of Michigan.

== Civil rights activism ==
Soon after arriving at Michigan, Noonan joined VOICE, a chapter of Students for a Democratic Society, and she raised funds for Student Non-Violent Coordinating Committee (SNCC) by selling copies of a documentary record made about the Albany Movement. When she heard presentations by Curtis Hayes and Tom Hayden she was "almost giddy with the idea that someone my age could take action that might change the overall racial situation in the United States”. From 1962 to 1963, Martha organized a Friends of SNCC group in Ann Arbor, which was providing support for the student activists in the south. In 1963 at the age of 18, Noonan first went to the American south. She ended up in Albany, Georgia where she noted she "was scared the whole time I was there”. By 1965 Noonan deliberately was eating in newly integrated places, such as a Holiday Inn in Selma, Alabama, where she remained calm while keeping her right to eat in such institutions. Noonan crossed paths with other civil rights activists including Prathia Hall and Stokely Carmichael.

== Later life ==
Noonan married Silas Norman in 1967 and they had one son. She taught classes on African American history at the University of Michigan, the University of Toledo, and Wayne State University. In 2012, Noonan co-edited the book Hands on the Freedom Plow: Personal Accounts by Women in SNCC which was reviewed by The Women's Review of Books, The Journal of African American History, and the Journal of American Ethnic History.

== Selected publications ==
- Hands on the freedom plow : personal accounts by women in SNCC. Faith S. Holsaert, Martha P. Noonan, Judy Richardson, Betty Garman Robinson, Jean Smith Young, Dorothy Zellner. Urbana. 2012. ISBN 978-0-252-07888-0. OCLC 812780336.
