= Faith Holsaert =

American educator and activist (born 1943)

- Born: 1943 (age 81–82); New York City, U.S.
- Occupations: Educator; activist

Faith Holsaert (born 1943) is an American educator and activist during the civil rights movement.

Holsaert was born in New York City in 1943. She was raised by her Jewish mother, Eunice Spellman Holsaert, who was divorced, and her female African American music teacher, Charity Abigail Bailey, in the same household, in Greenwich Village. Being brought up in a biracial household, headed by two mother-figures, she was raised in the midst much unrest and disapproval from those around her. She volunteered for the Harlem Brotherhood Group and the Student Nonviolent Coordinating Committee as a teenager. She matriculated to Barnard University in 1961, when she first participated in a sit-in in Crisfield, Maryland to protest racial segregation. She was arrested at the sit-in. She registered voters in Terrell County, Georgia in 1962. She also volunteered for the Brown Berets. She resides in Durham, North Carolina.

== Publications ==
- Holsaert, Faith S., ed. Hands on the Freedom Plow: Personal Accounts by Women in SNCC. Urbana: University of Illinois Press, 2010. ISBN 9780252078880
- Holsaert, Faith S. Year Forever in My Veins. Student Non-Violent Coordinating Committee. Documentary Poems. Durham, NC: Backbone Press Inc, 2020. ISBN 9780999465998
- Holsaert, Faith S. Ma Lineal: A Memoir of Race, Activism, and Queer Family. Detroit, Michigan: Wayne State University Press, 2024. ISBN 9780814350799
