= List of In Treatment episodes =

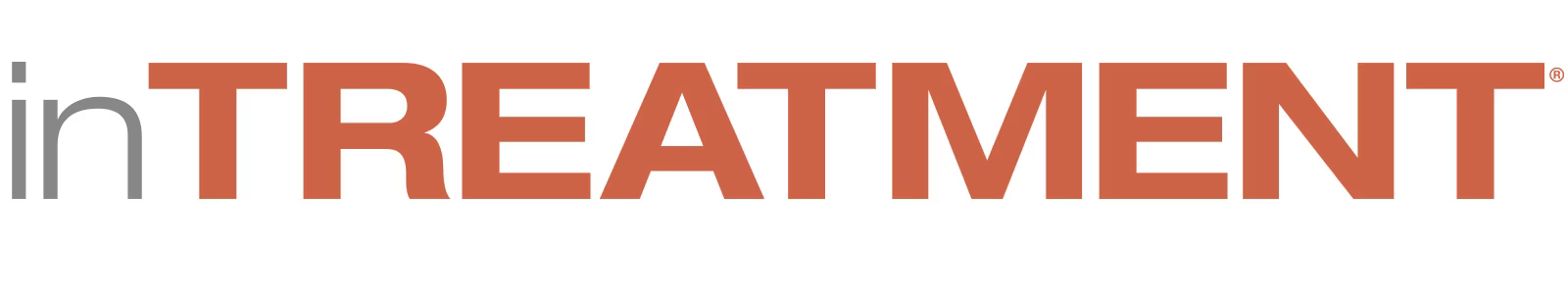

In Treatment is an American HBO drama television series developed by Rodrigo Garcia based on the Israeli series BeTipul created by Hagai Levi. The original series spans 106 episodes over three seasons, which were broadcast from 2008 to 2010. The first three seasons starred Gabriel Byrne as psychotherapist Paul Weston as he treats his various patients.

In October 2020, HBO confirmed the series would return for a fourth season with Uzo Aduba in the lead role. The 24-episode season premiered on May 23, 2021.

During the course of the series, 130 episodes of In Treatment aired over four seasons, concluding on June 28, 2021.

== Series overview ==
Season	Episodes	Originally released	
Season	Episodes	First released	Last released
1	43	January 28, 2008	March 28, 2008
2	35	April 5, 2009	May 5, 2009
3	28	October 25, 2010	December 7, 2010
4	24	May 23, 2021	June 28, 2021

== Episodes ==
=== Season 1 (2008) ===
The first season follows Dr. Paul Weston and his weekly sessions with his patients. Each night focuses on one specific patient.

Season 1 episode index
	Monday	Tuesday	Wednesday	Thursday	Friday
	Laura	Alex	Sophie	Jake and Amy	Paul and Gina
Week 1	1	2	3	4	5
Week 2	6	7	8	9	10
Week 3	11	12	13	14	15
Week 4	16	17	18	19	20
Week 5	21	22	23	24	25
Week 6	26	27	28	29	30
Week 7	31	32	33	34	35
Week 8	36	37	38	39	40
Week 9	–	–	41	42	43

No. overall	No. in season	Title	Directed by	Written by	Original release date
1	1	"Laura – Week 1"	Rodrigo García	Story by : Yael Hedaya; Teleplay by : Rodrigo García	January 28, 2008
Laura, an attractive young anesthesiologist, shocks Paul after divulging a sordid bar encounter with a stranger by declaring her love for him.
2	2	"Alex – Week 1"	Rodrigo García	Story by : Ari Folman; Teleplay by : Rodrigo García	January 29, 2008
Alex, an intense Navy pilot, tests Paul's credentials while recounting an event in Iraq that drove him to therapy. Although he carried out his duty and destroyed his target, it appears that 16 innocent children were also killed.
3	3	"Sophie – Week 1"	Rodrigo García	Story by : Nir Bergman; Teleplay by : Rodrigo García	January 30, 2008
Sophie, a precocious young gymnast requires Paul's "professional opinion" for an insurance report detailing her recent accident in which she broke both arms and is regarded as suspicious.
4	4	"Jake and Amy – Week 1"	Rodrigo García	Story by : Daphna Levin; Teleplay by : Rodrigo García	January 31, 2008
Jake and Amy, a bickering husband and wife, force Paul to advise them the issue they've spent the last three weeks debating: whether or not Amy should have an abortion.
5	5	"Paul and Gina – Week 1"	Rodrigo García	Story by : Asaf Zippor; Teleplay by : Rodrigo García	February 1, 2008
Worried he's "losing patience with my patients," Paul pays a visit to Dr. Gina Toll, a retired therapist he'd last seen nearly ten years ago.
6	6	"Laura – Week 2"	Rodrigo García	Story by : Yael Hedaya; Teleplay by : Amy Lippman	February 4, 2008
Paul is surprised when Laura announces that she's agreed to marry her boyfriend even though she admits that she still desires Paul.
7	7	"Alex – Week 2"	Rodrigo García	Story by : Ari Folman; Teleplay by : Bryan Goluboff	February 5, 2008
Alex describes his stoic return to the bombing scene in Iraq where he felt divorced from the reality of their suffering, and reveals that he has issues with his wife.
8	8	"Sophie – Week 2"	Rodrigo García	Story by : Nir Bergman; Teleplay by : Sarah Treem	February 6, 2008
Sophie arrives wet and bedraggled, and Paul gets Kate to change her into dry clothes. Sophie vents about her team and her parents, and accuses Paul of not listening to her, however Paul surprises her with his detailed notes and psychological opinion from their first session.
9	9	"Jake and Amy – Week 2"	Rodrigo García	Story by : Asaf Zippor & Daphna Levin; Teleplay by : William Merritt Johnson	February 7, 2008
Jake and Amy seem to have resolved their differences about her pregnancy, but the session ends abruptly when Amy starts bleeding. While cleaning up, Paul's wife, Kate, forces him to confront the realities of the fractures in their own marriage and reveals that she is having an affair.
10	10	"Paul and Gina – Week 2"	Rodrigo García	Story by : Asaf Zippor; Teleplay by : Davey Holmes	February 8, 2008
Paul's traumatic week, especially news of Kate's affair leads Gina to make observations about Paul's behavior and attraction to Laura that he rejects. Paul then goes on the attack, raising sensitive events in Gina's past.
11	11	"Laura – Week 3"	Rodrigo García	Story by : Yael Hedaya; Teleplay by : Amy Lippman	February 11, 2008
Laura shows up late and Paul is unsympathetic to her excuses. He broaches the difficult subject of whether or not their sessions are helping her and she leaves on bad terms with the issue unresolved. Outside, she encounters Alex who has arrived on the wrong day and he gives her a lift into town.
12	12	"Alex – Week 3"	Rodrigo García	Story by : Ari Folman; Teleplay by : Bryan Goluboff	February 12, 2008
Alex is in a positive mood and arrives with a coffee machine for the office. He tells Paul that he has left his wife whom he greatly admires, and Paul explores the similarities between Alex and his father. Alex also says he met Laura much to Paul's surprise and he unsuccessfully tries to seek Paul's advice on the relationship.
13	13	"Sophie – Week 3"	Christopher Misiano	Story by : Nir Bergman; Teleplay by : Sarah Treem	February 13, 2008
Sophie begins to open up to Paul about the circumstances surrounding the breakup of her parents, and her complex relationship with her coach and his family. Paul becomes concerned about Sophie's mental state as her physical recovery draws near.
14	14	"Jake and Amy – Week 3"	Christopher Misiano	Story by : Daphna Levin; Teleplay by : William Merritt Johnson	February 14, 2008
Amy arrives alone and examines her reaction of relief to her miscarriage which has given her a sense of freedom. Jake arrives and argues with Amy, accusing her of being flirtatious. Later, Kate announces to Paul that she's going away for a week with her lover and he gets quite angry.
15	15	"Paul and Gina – Week 3"	Rodrigo García	Story by : Asaf Zippor; Teleplay by : Davey Holmes	February 15, 2008
Gina tries to get to the root of Paul's connection to Laura and Paul becomes hostile, accusing Gina of prying into her private life, while appearing to be in denial of his own behavior.
16	16	"Laura – Week 4"	Christopher Misiano	Story by : Yael Hedaya; Teleplay by : Amy Lippman	February 18, 2008
To Paul's discomfort, Laura describes in intimate detail her burgeoning relationship with Alex although she is critical of his love-making abilities. Meanwhile, Laura begins to psychoanalyze Paul.
17	17	"Alex – Week 4"	Christopher Misiano	Story by : Eran Kolirin; Teleplay by : Bryan Goluboff	February 19, 2008
Alex describes his recent encounter with Laura whose mercurial behavior he finds difficult to understand. He seeks answers from Paul about Laura which Paul is unable to answer, and Alex questions whether therapy can help him.
18	18	"Sophie – Week 4"	Rodrigo García	Story by : Nir Bergman; Teleplay by : Sarah Treem	February 20, 2008
Sophie has physically recovered from her injuries, but arrives exhausted from staying up all night at a party. She starts to open up to Paul, and reveals the events leading up to her accident, admitting that she attempted suicide. Then, on a visit to the bathroom, Sophie swallows a bottle of tablets and collapses.
19	19	"Jake and Amy – Week 4"	Rodrigo García	Story by : Daphna Levin; Teleplay by : William Merritt Johnson	February 21, 2008
Jake and Amy arrive in an argumentative mood, and Paul explores the issues that brought them together but which have also fueled their volatile relationship. They each leave angrily indicating that they may not return.
20	20	"Paul and Gina – Week 4"	Rodrigo García	Story by : Asaf Zippor; Teleplay by : Davey Holmes	February 22, 2008
Paul seems more relaxed and talks about his week, however the perennial issue of the boundaries that exist between therapists and patients is raised and debated again. Paul finally admits that he is in love with Laura and that he is prepared to risk the consequences of crossing the boundary.
21	21	"Laura – Week 5"	Rodrigo García	Story by : Yael Hedaya; Teleplay by : Amy Lippman	February 25, 2008
Laura announces that she is ending her sessions with Paul who hides his emotional reaction. Talking about an incident at work then prompts Laura to tell Paul about her experience of initiating her first sexual encounter in her youth with David, an older man. Paul overreacts, condemning the David's behaviour, however they embrace briefly before she leaves.
22	22	"Alex – Week 5"	Paris Barclay	Story by : Eran Kolirin; Teleplay by : Bryan Goluboff	February 26, 2008
Alex peppers Paul with a series of personal questions, including pressing Paul to admit whether anything happened between him and Laura. Paul's refusal to answer, and his evasive responses, causes Alex to accuse Paul of being in love with Laura and it pushes Paul to physically overreact. Later, Kate arrives home and reveals that her affair is over.
23	23	"Sophie – Week 5"	Paris Barclay	Story by : Nir Bergman; Teleplay by : Sarah Treem	February 27, 2008
When Sophie's mother Olivia joins her daughter's therapy session, Paul witnesses first-hand the hostility and anger Sophie holds toward her mother, and the pressure Olivia puts on Sophie. Olivia leaves and Paul finally gets Sophie to talk about her threats and attempts at suicide.
24	24	"Jake and Amy – Week 5"	Paris Barclay	Story by : Daphna Levin; Teleplay by : William Merritt Johnson	February 28, 2008
The previous week's conflict leads to an argumentative session in which Jake and Amy both accuse Paul of being hostile. When Amy says that she wants a divorce, Jake becomes emotional and pleads with her not to leave him.
25	25	"Paul and Gina – Week 5"	Rodrigo García	Story by : Asaf Zippor; Teleplay by : Davey Holmes	February 29, 2008
Kate joins Paul in therapy for the first time where Paul is still angry at Kate over her affair. When they begin examining their needs within the marriage, Paul reveals his desire for Laura, undermining the impact of his outrage at Kate's infidelity.
26	26	"Laura – Week 6"	Paris Barclay	Story by : Yael Hedaya; Teleplay by : Amy Lippman	March 3, 2008
Laura returns to therapy, and Paul surprisingly admits his affection for Laura who is taken aback by his revelation. He makes a point to her about the difference between fantasy and reality through an example of his own childhood infatuation which prompts her to admit her affair with the older David was not as romantic as she first described it. As Laura leaves, she encounters Kate.
27	27	"Alex – Week 6"	Melanie Mayron	Story by : Ori Sivan & Hagai Levi; Teleplay by : Bryan Goluboff	March 4, 2008
Alex is in a talkative mood, and after eliciting an apology from Paul for crossing a boundary, he talks about a recent dream which he wants Paul to decipher. This leads Alex to an emotional introspection of his motivations, his sexuality, and his relationship with his autocratic father.
28	28	"Sophie – Week 6"	Melanie Mayron	Story by : Nir Bergman; Teleplay by : Sarah Treem	March 5, 2008
Sophie has a pizza delivered to Paul's office but only eats a small amount. This provokes a discussion about eating which leads to Sophie to confront her hidden anger toward her father and the beautiful but superficial women he spends his time with.
29	29	"Jake and Amy – Week 6"	Paris Barclay	Story by : Daphna Levin; Teleplay by : William Merritt Johnson	March 6, 2008
Amy arrives alone and criticizes Jake who has become more attentive and affectionate, but less desirable. Paul gets her to open up about her childhood obesity, and the negative attitudes of her parents and sister towards her. Amy then reveals that she plans to spend an evening with her boss, which elicits a warning from Paul about her self-destructive behavior.
30	30	"Paul and Gina – Week 6"	Paris Barclay	Story by : Asaf Zippor; Teleplay by : Davey Holmes	March 7, 2008
Paul and Kate's initial concern over their daughter Rosie's whereabouts gives way to a discussion about their relationship. Gina's attempt to explain Paul's attraction to Laura and Kate's role in Paul's life leads to a heated exchange between Paul and Gina that completely excludes Kate.
31	31	"Laura – Week 7"	Melanie Mayron	Story by : Omer Tadmor; Teleplay by : Amy Lippman	March 10, 2008
In Laura's absence, daughter Rosie enters Paul's office and during a casual discussion reveals that she knows that Kate went to Rome with another man, and tells Paul to fix the marriage. Later, Paul's oldest son Ian drops in, and when Paul tells him that he and Kate are having problems, Ian suggests that Paul make up his mind about what he wants.
32	32	"Alex – Week 7"	Paris Barclay	Bryan Goluboff	March 11, 2008
Alex has decided to return to duty and asks Paul to support his decision. Paul presses him for the reasons and Alex insists that discipline and structure is what he needs after being present at his son's birthday party at which he felt uncomfortable and excluded, especially after an argument with his father.
33	33	"Sophie – Week 7"	Melanie Mayron	Story by : Nir Bergman; Teleplay by : Sarah Treem	March 12, 2008
Sophie attempts to convince Paul of the unique relationship she shares with her father, and relates a dream in which she saw Paul as a physical threat to her father. Paul tries to get Sophie to acknowledge that her father has had little time for her and that he has made her complicit in his affairs with models. He also tries to encourage Sophie to be more sympathetic to her mother who has always been there for her.
34	34	"Jake and Amy – Week 7"	Melanie Mayron	Story by : Daphna Levin; Teleplay by : William Merritt Johnson	March 13, 2008
Jake says things have been going well, but Amy disagrees. Amy has a stomach cramp, which triggers her memory of the first time it happened, when her father was killed in an accident and she blamed herself. Then she blurts out that she slept with her boss, but surprisingly, Jake is not angry. Paul realizes that she has never forgiven herself.
35	35	"Paul and Gina – Week 7"	Rodrigo García	Story by : Asaf Zippor; Teleplay by : Davey Holmes	March 14, 2008
Gina steers Kate and Paul away from talking about Rosie and the children and towards talking about themselves. Paul is grateful when Gina overcomes his resistance to a therapy exercise of reflective listening, which proves helpful.
36	36	"Laura – Week 8"	Paris Barclay	Amy Lippman	March 17, 2008
Paul attends Alex's funeral after Alex died in a training accident. He meets Laura there and they reflect on their time with Alex. Paul meets Alex's father Alex Prince Sr., but does not reveal his connection with Alex.
37	37	"Alex – Week 8"	Paris Barclay	Story by : Uzi Weil; Teleplay by : Bryan Goluboff	March 18, 2008
Alex's father visits Paul at the scheduled time for Alex's session. Alex Prince Sr. tries to solicit information about his son and whether he died by suicide. Paul treads a fine line between helping the father without betraying Alex's confidence. Alex's father partly blames himself for what he sees as his failure by being too hard on his son.
38	38	"Sophie – Week 8"	Paris Barclay	Story by : Nir Bergman; Teleplay by : Sarah Treem	March 19, 2008
A tearful and agitated Sophie seems at crisis point, with a skin rash and trembling during gymnastics training. She has been attempting to stop being angry at her mother and forgiving of her philandering father. Paul tries to get her to stop blaming herself for her parents' mistakes, and she finally seems to make some progress.
39	39	"Jake and Amy – Week 8"	Paris Barclay	Story by : Daphna Levin; Teleplay by : William Merritt Johnson	March 20, 2008
Jake arrives alone, and talks freely about his past week. He describes a recent long-distance drive to his parents' home to clear his head and his overbearing and unforgiving father who has high expectations. Paul begins to link Jake's perceptions of Amy to those of his father.
40	40	"Paul and Gina – Week 8"	Rodrigo García	Story by : Asaf Zippor; Teleplay by : Davey Holmes	March 21, 2008
Paul arrives alone and begins and again questions the value of therapy. The tone of the discussion changes when Paul raises the topic of Laura himself and then accuses Gina of doing so. On the attack, Paul raises the similar situation of Gina and a patient, Charlie, while married to David. He accuses her of being too cold and clinical, but she completely surprises him by saying that she is too emotional. She stops Paul from analyzing her and forbids him from ever raising the topic of Charlie again.
41	41	"Sophie – Week 9"	Melanie Mayron	Story by : Nir Bergman; Teleplay by : Sarah Treem	March 26, 2008
As Sophie arrives for her session, her father appears and asks her to skip her therapy session but she refuses. He verbally insults Paul, but Sophie eventually agrees to her father joining the session. Although her father swears that he was instrumental in her upbringing, Sophie confronts him about his absence for two and a half years to live with another woman and begins to assert her own independence.
42	42	"Jake and Amy – Week 9"	Melanie Mayron	Story by : Daphna Levin; Teleplay by : William Merritt Johnson and Sarah Treem	March 27, 2008
Jake announces that he and Amy have decided to separate. They have widely divergent views about the decision and Amy blames Paul for splitting them apart. Angry and brittle, Amy eventually reveals that she needs Jake much more than she thought she did. Paul tries to inject some practical realities into what the separation means, especially for their son, Lenny. At the end of the session, Amy is reluctant to leave.
43	43	"Paul and Gina – Week 9"	Paris Barclay, Rodrigo García	Story by : Maya Heffner, Hagai Levi, Asaf Zippor; Teleplay by : Amy Lippman	March 28, 2008
Paul decides to act on his romantic pursuit of Laura and visits her at her house. He declares his love for her in what appears a cold unemotional way. Uncertain about her own emotions, Laura invites him to bed, but Paul has a massive panic attack and leaves. Later he visits Gina and unloads the episode onto her, but she asserts that the anxiety attack was his own way of stopping himself from making a terrible mistake.

=== Season 2 (2009) ===
The second season continues to focus on the life of Paul Weston and the complex lives of a new group of patients while he still sees his mentor Dr. Gina Toll.

Season 2 episode index
	Monday	Tuesday	Wednesday	Thursday	Friday
	Mia	April	Oliver	Walter	Gina
Week 1	1	2	3	4	5
Week 2	6	7	8	9	10
Week 3	11	12	13	14	15
Week 4	16	17	18	19	20
Week 5	21	22	23	24	25
Week 6	26	27	28	29	30
Week 7	31	32	33	34	35

No. overall	No. in season	Title	Directed by	Written by	Original release date
44	1	"Mia – Week 1"	Paris Barclay	Story by : Yael Hedaya; Teleplay by : Warren Leight & Jacquelyn Reingold	April 5, 2009
Alex Prince Sr. pays a surprise visit to Paul and subpoenas him to appear before court for malpractice over his son's death. When Paul arranges a meeting with his lawyers, he finds his case is assigned to Mia, a former patient and current malpractice lawyer who raises some issues from their common past.
45	2	"April – Week 1"	Paris Barclay	Story by : Keren Margalit; Teleplay by : Warren Leight & Sarah Treem	April 5, 2009
Paul is alarmed to learn that his new patient April, an architecture student, has advanced non-Hodgkin lymphoma. It is a secret she refuses to share with anyone including her parents. She is in denial, refusing to have chemotherapy and instead wants to pursue natural remedies.
46	3	"Oliver – Week 1"	Ryan Fleck	Story by : Daphna Levin; Teleplay by : Warren Leight & Keith Bunin	April 6, 2009
A sixth-grader named Oliver is taken to see Paul by his parents, Bess and Luke, who are separated and preparing to divorce. They have very different ideas about Oliver's needs, and Oliver refuses to stay at his father's house because he feels that his father's "hands off" attitude feels like neglect.
47	4	"Walter – Week 1"	Paris Barclay	Story by : Uzi Weil; Teleplay by : Warren Leight & Pat Healy	April 6, 2009
Walter, a high-powered CEO, turns to Paul for a cure to his insomnia and is impatiently looking for a quick solution. As Paul tries to draw out possible causes, Walter has a panic attack while talking about his daughter who is volunteering in Rwanda.
48	5	"Gina – Week 1"	Terry George	Story by : Asaf Zippor; Teleplay by : Warren Leight & Marsha Norman	April 6, 2009
Paul travels from Brooklyn to Baltimore to visit Gina, who has been asked to give a deposition in the lawsuit against him over Alex's death. He is feeling very negative about his life and work, and asks Gina for answers she cannot provide. Eventually they agree to resume his Friday therapy sessions to address his concerns.
49	6	"Mia – Week 2"	Paris Barclay	Story by : Yael Hedaya; Teleplay by : Jacquelyn Reingold	April 12, 2009
Mia visits Paul, intending it to be a meeting of equals, but she brings up their past sessions from 20 years earlier. Then, she was conflicted over whether to have a baby or pursue a legal career and accuses Paul of advising her to have an abortion. Now, years later she finds herself in an unfulfilling relationship with her married boss, without a partner, desperate to have a child, and blames Paul for her predicament.
50	7	"April – Week 2"	Hagai Levi	Story by : Keren Margalit; Teleplay by : Sarah Treem	April 12, 2009
April describes her annoyance at the concerns of her former boyfriend and his current partner who are worried about her cancer. She asserts her independence and refuses to be defined by her illness.
51	8	"Oliver – Week 2"	Ryan Fleck	Story by : Daphna Levin; Teleplay by : Keith Bunin	April 13, 2009
Oliver fears that his behavior has led to his parents' estrangement. He is unable to tell them about being bullied at school, fearing that it will exacerbate the problem. To his mother's surprise, Oliver decides to stay at his father's place in accordance with their plans.
52	9	"Walter – Week 2"	Hagai Levi	Story by : Uzi Weil, Hagai Levi; Teleplay by : Pat Healy	April 13, 2009
Paul learns more about Walter's background and the expectations of his parents, and his fears of loss. This helps Paul start to identify possible causes for Walter's panic attacks.
53	10	"Gina – Week 2"	Terry George	Story by : Asaf Zippor; Teleplay by : Marsha Norman	April 13, 2009
Paul agrees to enter therapy again with Gina to deal with his current issues. Gina still believes the answers lie in Paul's relationship with his parents, especially his mother's first attempted suicide on the happy Christmas eve he spent at Tammy Kent's house. Paul decides to contact Tammy to fill in memory gaps about that event.
54	11	"Mia – Week 3"	Paris Barclay	Story by : Yael Hedaya; Teleplay by : Jacquelyn Reingold	April 19, 2009
Paul arrives late for the session and Mia takes him to task. She has Laura's deposition in the Alex Prince case and presses Paul for details about his relationship with Laura. She shows signs of jealousy, which Paul uses as a means to question her unsatisfactory relationships with men.
55	12	"April – Week 3"	Paris Barclay	Story by : Keren Margalit; Teleplay by : Sarah Treem	April 19, 2009
Paul explores April's need to protect her mother from the reality of her cancer, which brings to the surface the memory of a childhood near-tragedy that underscores her lifelong independence issues.
56	13	"Oliver – Week 3"	Ryan Fleck	Story by : Daphna Levin; Teleplay by : Keith Bunin	April 20, 2009
Superficially, Oliver's week-long stay at his father's was a success. However it exposes Oliver's desire to prevent his parents from arguing. Paul tries to get his parents Bess and Luke to focus more on how their argumentative behavior affects Oliver.
57	14	"Walter – Week 3"	Norberto Barba	Story by : Uzi Weil, Hagai Levi; Teleplay by : Pat Healy	April 20, 2009
In the midst of a corporate crisis, Walter recounts an emotional attempt to rescue and protect his daughter who is volunteering in Africa, but he can't understand her refusal to accept his help. Paul tries to get Walter to understand that she needs independence from his obsession to be in control.
58	15	"Gina – Week 3"	Jean de Segonzac	Story by : Asaf Zippor; Teleplay by : Marsha Norman	April 20, 2009
Paul begins an affair with Tammy, but keeps it a secret from Gina. In his session with Gina, she explores Paul's resentment of having to take care of his ailing father. She encourages Paul to re-evaluate his memories of his father's behavior towards his mother and Paul's limited and potentially distorted recollections of that time.
59	16	"Mia – Week 4"	Joshua Marston	Story by : Yael Hedaya; Teleplay by : Jacquelyn Reingold	April 26, 2009
Mia arrives in a hyperactive mood following an unruly weekend of intense casual sex. Paul explores Mia's behaviour and her relationship with her father, who is the only person she is close to. She finally admits to her profound loneliness.
60	17	"April – Week 4"	Jim McKay	Story by : Keren Margalit; Teleplay by : Sarah Treem	April 26, 2009
Paul learns more about April and her mother's commitment to caring for her autistic brother Daniel, and its emotional cost to them both. After April faints due to her weakened state, Paul crosses a professional boundary, insisting that she commence chemotherapy, and offers to accompany her to the hospital.
61	18	"Oliver – Week 4"	Ryan Fleck	Story by : Daphna Levin; Teleplay by : Keith Bunin	April 27, 2009
Oliver's mother Bess arrives and explains that Oliver is displaying exemplary behavior and is eating much less, however Paul suspects that it is merely an illusion. When Paul is alone with Oliver, he finds that the boy is starving, is still being bullied at school and is also insecure because he believes that he may have been adopted.
62	19	"Walter – Week 4"	Alan Taylor	Story by : Shiri Artzi; Teleplay by : Warren Leight	April 27, 2009
Walter finds himself at a loss because he has been relieved of his position as CEO because of a product safety scandal. Walter then has to confront his feelings of duty and need to be in control.
63	20	"Gina – Week 4"	Paris Barclay	Story by : Asaf Zippor; Teleplay by : Marsha Norman	April 27, 2009
Gina encourages Paul to reconnect with his ailing father before it is too late.
64	21	"Mia – Week 5"	Paris Barclay	Story by : Yael Hedaya; Teleplay by : Jacquelyn Reingold	May 3, 2009
Paul is distracted following the death of his father and is forced back to the present when Mia reveals that she is pregnant following the weekend of casual sex. She is committed to keeping the baby, and together Paul and Mia examine issues of life, death, loneliness and last chances.
65	22	"April – Week 5"	Jim McKay	Story by : Keren Margalit; Teleplay by : Sarah Treem	May 3, 2009
April has commenced chemotherapy, but has not yet told her parents about her cancer. She mentions her best friend Leah, but April's reluctance to lean on those closest to her triggers a discussion with Paul about reliance.
66	23	"Oliver – Week 5"	Ryan Fleck	Story by : Daphna Levin; Teleplay by : Keith Bunin	May 4, 2009
Oliver arrives at Paul's office early after absconding from school because of being bullied again. He complains about the difficulties of living with his father. Luke arrives angry and complains to Paul about Oliver's recent deteriorating behavior at home and school. Paul manages to convince Luke that he is behaving like the absent father he hated and Luke finally softens his attitude towards Oliver.
67	24	"Walter – Week 5"	Jean de Segonzac	Story by : Shiri Artzi; Teleplay by : Warren Leight	May 4, 2009
Paul visits Walter in hospital following an overdose of sleeping pills. Paul tries to convince Walter that his actions are affecting those around him which Walter stubbornly refuses to accept.
68	25	"Gina – Week 5"	Terry George	Story by : Asaf Zippor; Teleplay by : Marsha Norman	May 4, 2009
Following his father's funeral, Paul tells Kate that he still loves her and wants to reconcile, but she rejects the offer. Gina convinces Paul to address unanswered questions about his father after he learned more about his father at the funeral than he ever knew. Later, Paul meets Alex Sr. who offers to drop his lawsuit for the insurance payout but also on the condition Paul accepts full responsibility for Alex's death.
69	26	"Mia – Week 6"	Ryan Fleck	Story by : Yael Hedaya; Teleplay by : Jacquelyn Reingold	May 17, 2009
Mia is in a state of shock and tells Paul that her pregnancy was not confirmed and reveals that her mother visited to console her. Paul uses the event to help Mia re-examine her contentious relationship with her mother and re-evaluate her belief in her father's devotion to her.
70	27	"April – Week 6"	Michael Pressman	Story by : Keren Margalit; Teleplay by : Sarah Treem	May 17, 2009
April is angry with Paul because of what she sees as a betrayal after he told her mother about the cancer. Paul tries to defend his actions while addressing April's deep-rooted insecurities and mistrust of others who are close to her.
71	28	"Oliver – Week 6"	Paris Barclay	Story by : Daphna Levin; Teleplay by : Keith Bunin	May 18, 2009
Bess is offered an employment opportunity two and a half hours away, and Luke accuses her of trying to take custody of Oliver, but then he refuses to have Oliver at his own house. Luke and Bess come up with a plan to split the care responsibilities, but Oliver feels that neither of his parents really want him. Oliver asks to live with Paul, but when Paul declines, Oliver resigns himself to an unhappy future.
72	29	"Walter – Week 6"	Paris Barclay	Story by : Shiri Artzi; Teleplay by : Warren Leight	May 18, 2009
Walter has been committed to an institution but is desperate to leave and tries to manipulate Paul into approving his release. Paul resists the pressure, and calls out Walter's behavior for what it is and gets someway towards enabling Walter to embrace his vulnerable side.
73	30	"Gina – Week 6"	Richard Schiff	Story by : Asaf Zippor; Teleplay by : Marsha Norman	May 18, 2009
Paul is frustrated with his what he sees as a failure to help his patients, but then accuses Gina of the same fault. He forces Gina into angrily refuting his accusation that she's not involved with her patients.
74	31	"Mia – Week 7"	Courtney Hunt	Story by : Yael Hedaya; Teleplay by : Jacquelyn Reingold	May 24, 2009
Mia tells Paul that she is quitting counselling as it is making her feel worse, especially after she confronted her father about his lack of support for her mother. She tries various tactics to change the relationship with Paul from a professional to a personal one without success. Eventually Paul breaks through her façade, and she agrees to continue therapy.
75	32	"April – Week 7"	Jim McKay	Story by : Keren Margalit; Teleplay by : Sarah Treem	May 24, 2009
In her final session with Paul, April reveals that the chemotherapy has worked and she is in remission, which has changed her outlook on life and the people close to her. Paul gets her to begin facing her anger and her future, and increases her trust in him by giving her his father's old leather flying helmet.
76	33	"Oliver – Week 7"	Ryan Fleck	Story by : Daphna Levin; Teleplay by : Keith Bunin	May 25, 2009
Oliver is extremely unhappy about the new domestic arrangement of living with his mother and refuses to talk with Paul. Bess and Luke manage to find some closure and Paul eventually gets Oliver to reluctantly accept the situation by offering ongoing support.
77	34	"Walter – Week 7"	Warren Leight	Story by : Shiri Artzi; Teleplay by : Warren Leight	May 25, 2009
Walter is released into the custody of his wife and daughter but he feels smothered. Paul maps out a plan and Walter begins to accept his new situation, one in which he is different from his old self.
78	35	"Gina – Week 7"	Paris Barclay	Story by : Asaf Zippor; Teleplay by : Marsha Norman	May 25, 2009
Tensions between Gina and Paul escalate, but are diffused somewhat when Paul receives a call that the malpractice suit against him has been thrown out of court. Eventually, Paul states that he wants to end his sessions with Gina and when he leaves, she closes the door on him both physically and metaphorically.

=== Season 3 (2010) ===
The third season continues focusing on the life of Paul Weston (Gabriel Byrne) and the complex lives of his patients.

Season 3 episode index
	Monday	Tuesday	Wednesday	Friday
	Sunil	Frances	Jesse	Adele
Week 1	1	2	3	4
Week 2	5	6	7	8
Week 3	9	10	11	12
Week 4	13	14	15	16
Week 5	17	18	19	20
Week 6	21	22	23	24
Week 7	26 (Tuesday)	25	27	28

No. overall	No. in season	Title	Directed by	Written by	Original release date	U.S. viewers (millions)
79	1	"Sunil – Week 1"	Paris Barclay	Story by : Adam Rapp & Jhumpa Lahiri; Teleplay by : Adam Rapp	October 25, 2010	N/A
A retired math professor from Bengal, Sunil (Irrfan Khan), accompanied by his son Arun (Samrat Chakrabarti) and daughter-in-law Julia (Sonya Walger), reluctantly visit Paul to discuss the death of Sunil's wife six months earlier, his subsequent displacement to the U.S., and the recent tensions he's experienced while living with his son's family
80	2	"Frances – Week 1"	Paris Barclay	Alison Tatlock	October 25, 2010	N/A
A well-known stage and screen actress (Debra Winger), whose sister was treated by Paul 18 years earlier, begins therapy to uncover the reasons why she is "blanking out" during rehearsals for a new play.
81	3	"Jesse – Week 1"	Paris Barclay	Sarah Treem	October 26, 2010	0.227
A 16-year-old homosexual (Dane DeHaan), who has been seeing Paul for some time after being caught peddling prescription drugs to classmates, talks about his troubling "pattern of promiscuity," his unsettled family life with adopted parents and a recent alarming voicemail.
82	4	"Adele – Week 1"	Paris Barclay	Anya Epstein & Dan Futterman	October 26, 2010	0.250
In order to get a new prescription for sleeping pills, an exhausted Paul visits a young, serious and intelligent therapist (Amy Ryan), and is compelled to confront deep-rooted fears about his health, his divorce, his patients, and his all-encompassing relationship with former therapist Gina Toll.
83	5	"Sunil – Week 2"	Ali Selim	Adam Rapp	November 1, 2010	N/A
Sunil confronts his inability to voice his frustrations as he recalls the first time he and his wife met their future daughter-in-law in Calcutta.
84	6	"Frances – Week 2"	Jim McKay	Alison Tatlock	November 1, 2010	N/A
Frances struggles to remember what distracts her during rehearsals, and she gets defensive when Paul mentions in passing that he spoke to her sister about her illness. Meanwhile, Paul sees a neurologist to be tested for Parkinson's.
85	7	"Jesse – Week 2"	Jim McKay	Sarah Treem	November 2, 2010	0.236
Jesse talks about his application to a prestigious arts program at the Rhode Island School of Design.
86	8	"Adele – Week 2"	Paris Barclay	Anya Epstein & Dan Futterman	November 2, 2010	0.266
Paul discusses Gina's book with Adele and vents about a particularly loathsome character he's certain is based on him. They explore how his dream and his possible Parkinson's are connected.
87	9	"Sunil – Week 3"	Ali Selim	Adam Rapp	November 8, 2010	N/A
Sunil makes tea as he describes his first wedding anniversary since his wife's death.
88	10	"Frances – Week 3"	Patricia Rozema	Alison Tatlock	November 8, 2010	N/A
Frances recalls her sister's one and only foray into acting in a college production, and discusses her mother's beauty before and after she became ill.
89	11	"Jesse – Week 3"	Courtney Hunt	Sarah Treem	November 9, 2010	0.239
Jesse is accompanied by his mother (Dendrie Taylor), but the strain of their relationship makes any kind of discussion difficult.
90	12	"Adele – Week 3"	Jim McKay	Anya Epstein & Dan Futterman	November 9, 2010	0.257
Paul complains of headaches the morning after taking Max to a concert to see Animal Collective, and is despondent while revealing what his son found on his computer
91	13	"Sunil – Week 4"	Paris Barclay	Adam Rapp	November 15, 2010	0.220
Sunil is unnerved by parallels between Arun and Julia's marriage and a romance from his youth.
92	14	"Frances – Week 4"	Ali Selim	Alison Tatlock	November 15, 2010	0.253
Painful family memories take a toll on Frances' self-esteem.
93	15	"Jesse – Week 4"	Jim McKay	Sarah Treem	November 16, 2010	0.232
Paul helps Jesse see a new path to meeting his birth parents.
94	16	"Adele – Week 4"	Paris Barclay	Anya Epstein & Dan Futterman	November 16, 2010	0.200
Adele tries to get Paul to talk about his lack of passion.
95	17	"Sunil – Week 5"	Ali Selim	Adam Rapp	November 22, 2010	N/A
Sunil's suspicions about Julia having an affair continue to rise.
96	18	"Frances – Week 5"	Jim McKay	Alison Tatlock	November 22, 2010	N/A
Frances goes over her Breast Cancer test results with Paul.
97	19	"Jesse – Week 5"	Paris Barclay	Sarah Treem	November 23, 2010	0.147
Jesse shows up unexpectedly the night before his session.
98	20	"Adele – Week 5"	Courtney Hunt	Anya Epstein & Dan Futterman	November 23, 2010	0.169
Adele tries to get Paul to acknowledge his preoccupation with a troubled relationship.
99	21	"Sunil – Week 6"	Paris Barclay	Adam Rapp	November 29, 2010	0.309
Paul is alarmed by Sunil's unpredictable behavior at home.
100	22	"Frances – Week 6"	Ali Selim	Alison Tatlock	November 29, 2010	0.271
Frances leans on Paul for support as her sister's health deteriorates.
101	23	"Jesse – Week 6"	Jim McKay	Sarah Treem	November 30, 2010	0.272
Jesse shrugs off Paul's optimism that his parents won't abandon him when he needs them most.
102	24	"Adele – Week 6"	Paris Barclay	Anya Epstein & Dan Futterman	November 30, 2010	0.323
Adele sees Paul's chronic indecisiveness as a source of his discontent.
103	25	"Frances – Week 7"	Ali Selim	Alison Tatlock	December 6, 2010	0.190
Frances struggles with the prospect of losing her sister Tricia.
104	26	"Sunil – Week 7"	Paris Barclay	Adam Rapp	December 6, 2010	0.235
Paul is blindsided by a revelation regarding Sunilʼs therapy.
105	27	"Jesse – Week 7"	Jim McKay	Sarah Treem	December 7, 2010	0.253
Paul tries to get Jesse to open up about a recent transgression and his relationship with his father Roberto.
106	28	"Adele – Week 7"	Paris Barclay	Anya Epstein & Dan Futterman	December 7, 2010	0.304
Blaming Adele for his recent setbacks with patients, Paul contemplates the future of his therapy, and his practice.

=== Season 4 (2021) ===
No. overall	No. in season	Title	Directed by	Written by	Original release date	U.S. viewers (millions)
107	1	"Eladio – Week 1"	Michelle MacLaren	Chris Gabo	May 23, 2021	0.160
108	2	"Colin – Week 1"	Michelle MacLaren	Zack Whedon	May 23, 2021	0.200
109	3	"Laila – Week 1"	Michelle MacLaren	Jackie Sibblies Drury	May 24, 2021	0.240
110	4	"Brooke – Week 1"	Michelle MacLaren	Joshua Allen	May 24, 2021	0.230
111	5	"Eladio – Week 2"	Julian Farino	Chris Gabo	May 30, 2021	0.190
112	6	"Colin – Week 2"	Julian Farino	Zack Whedon	May 30, 2021	0.150
113	7	"Laila – Week 2"	Julian Farino	Jackie Sibblies Drury	May 31, 2021	0.087
114	8	"Brooke – Week 2"	Julian Farino	Joshua Allen	May 31, 2021	0.082
115	9	"Eladio – Week 3"	Uta Briesewitz	Chris Gabo	June 6, 2021	0.119
116	10	"Colin – Week 3"	Uta Briesewitz	Zack Whedon	June 6, 2021	0.109
117	11	"Laila – Week 3"	Uta Briesewitz	Jackie Sibblies Drury	June 7, 2021	0.088
118	12	"Brooke – Week 3"	Uta Briesewitz	Joshua Allen	June 7, 2021	0.060
119	13	"Eladio – Week 4"	Janicza Bravo	Chris Gabo	June 13, 2021	0.160
120	14	"Colin – Week 4"	Janicza Bravo	Zack Whedon	June 13, 2021	0.110
121	15	"Laila – Week 4"	Janicza Bravo	Jackie Sibblies Drury	June 14, 2021	0.050
122	16	"Brooke – Week 4"	Janicza Bravo	Jennifer Schuur	June 14, 2021	0.070
123	17	"Eladio – Week 5"	Karyn Kusama	Chris Gabo	June 20, 2021	0.100
124	18	"Colin – Week 5"	Karyn Kusama	Zack Whedon	June 20, 2021	0.090
125	19	"Laila – Week 5"	Karyn Kusama	Jackie Sibblies Drury	June 21, 2021	0.186
126	20	"Brooke – Week 5"	Karyn Kusama	Jennifer Schuur	June 21, 2021	0.173
127	21	"Eladio – Week 6"	Jessica Yu	Chris Gabo	June 27, 2021	0.105
128	22	"Colin – Week 6"	Jessica Yu	Zack Whedon	June 27, 2021	0.095
129	23	"Laila – Week 6"	Jessica Yu	Jackie Sibblies Drury	June 28, 2021	0.088
130	24	"Brooke – Week 6"	Jessica Yu	Story by : Jennifer Schuur & Joshua Allen; Teleplay by : Jennifer Schuur	June 28, 2021	0.060

== Specials ==
Title	Original release date
"In Treatment: Private and Confidential"	April 24, 2009
Real-life doctors, patients and mental health experts divulge the challenges and rewards of psychotherapy in this In Treatment special.
