= The Great Migration: Journey to the North =

2011 book by Eloise Greenfield

- Author: Eloise Greenfield
- Illustrator: Jan Spivey Gilchrist
- Language: English
- Genre: Children's picture book
- Publisher: Amistad
- Publication date: 2011
- Publication place: United States
- Media type: Print (hardcover)
- Pages: 32
- ISBN: 978-0-06-125921-0
- OCLC: 51699

The Great Migration: Journey to the North is a 2011 children's poetry book. Written by Eloise Greenfield and illustrated by Jan Spivey Gilchrist, the poems depict the experiences and feelings of African-American families that participated in the Great Migration in the United States in the 20th century. It was first published by Amistad.

== Synopsis ==
The book begins with a page outlining a brief history of the Great Migration, as well as the author's personal experience as a part of it. She then narrates the journey from different perspectives using short poems. The first poem details advertisements and letters from companies in the north that were attempting to persuade African Americans to move for better work and safety. Greenfield compares a man's sad farewell to his land, children who give frightened goodbyes to their friends, and a woman's eager leaving as she hopes for a better place.

Other poems deal with packing bags and riding trains. A longer poem in the middle titled III. The Trip depicts the crowds of people leaving for the north who are hopeful and unsure. They make friends with one another and daydream about the places they are moving to. One stanza describes nights on the train, with the bright moon overhead and crying babies. Shorter poems describe men and women questioning if this move will truly help their families, and the joy of greeting loved ones at the northern train stations. The final poem is autobiographical. Greenfield tells the story of her father leaving to Washington, D.C., with her family following shortly afterward. Her family is just one of many determined to create a better life.

== Background ==
Both the author and the illustrator were a part of the Great Migration themselves. Greenfield's family moved when she was 4 months old from Parmele, North Carolina to Washington, D.C., while Gilchrist's family moved to Chicago, Illinois, before she was born. Both families fled due to assaults by the Ku Klux Klan, racial segregation, and difficulty finding work. At the beginning of the book, Greenfield notes that living in the North was not perfect and discrimination still existed, however families were able to make successful homes there. The illustrations were done in collage.

== Reception ==
In a starred review from The Horn Book Magazine, critics praise the way Greenfield gives "voice to unnamed travelers' thoughts" and comment on how Gilchrist's illustrations add "the right air of seriousness and history to the poetry". Booklist also gives the book a starred review, noting how the author's personal story and the illustrator's striking images combine to "create a powerful, haunting view of a pivotal moment in U.S. history". A review in Publishers Weekly also praises the author and illustrator pairing, mentioning that together they "capture a sense of both apprehension and hope". A starred review from School Library Journal said that Greenfield's "lyricism and her clear, narrative style" make this book "a solid choice for independent reading and for reading aloud". The critic also praised Gilchrist's illustrations that complement the poetry with warmth, as well as "stark desperation".

Greenfield received an author honor in the 2012 Coretta Scott King Awards.
