= Sharon Bell Mathis =

American librarian and author (born 1937)

Sharon Bell Mathis (born 1937) is an American librarian and author who has written books mainly for children and young adults.

== Early life ==
Mathis was born in Atlantic City, New Jersey. She started writing at an early age, and her love of reading was fostered by her parents. Her mother, a poet, encouraged her to write. In 1958, she earned a degree in Sociology from Morgan State College and, in 1975, went on to earn a master's in Library Science from the Catholic University of America.

== Career ==
Mathis has written many books for children and young adults, and has received many accolades in her career. Her book Ray Charles, a nonfiction biography of Ray Charles, received the Coretta Scott King Award. The Hundred Penny Box received a Newbery Honor Award, the Boston Globe–Horn Book Award, and is an American Library Association Notable Children's Book. English Journal placed Mathis alongside writers such as Toni Cade Bambara and Nikki Giovanni, characterizing them as "describing a black consciousness of self- celebration rather like that which flowered during the Harlem Renaissance and was somehow lost, at least in literature, in the intervening years of social upheaval." Teacup Full of Roses was a New York Times Outstanding Book of the Year. It was described, also in English Journal, as "a celebration of black family life, not of the stereotypical enduring parents, but of the children who find their strength in giving to each other."

== Published works ==
- Brooklyn Story (1970)
- Sidewalk Story (1971)
- Teacup Full of Roses (1972)
- Ray Charles (1973)
- Listen for the Fig Tree (1974)
- The Hundred Penny Box (1975)
- Cartwheels (1977)
- Red Dog, Blue Fly: Football Poems (1991)
- Running Girl: The Diary of Ebonee Rose (1997)
