= Jewish Motifs International Film Festival =

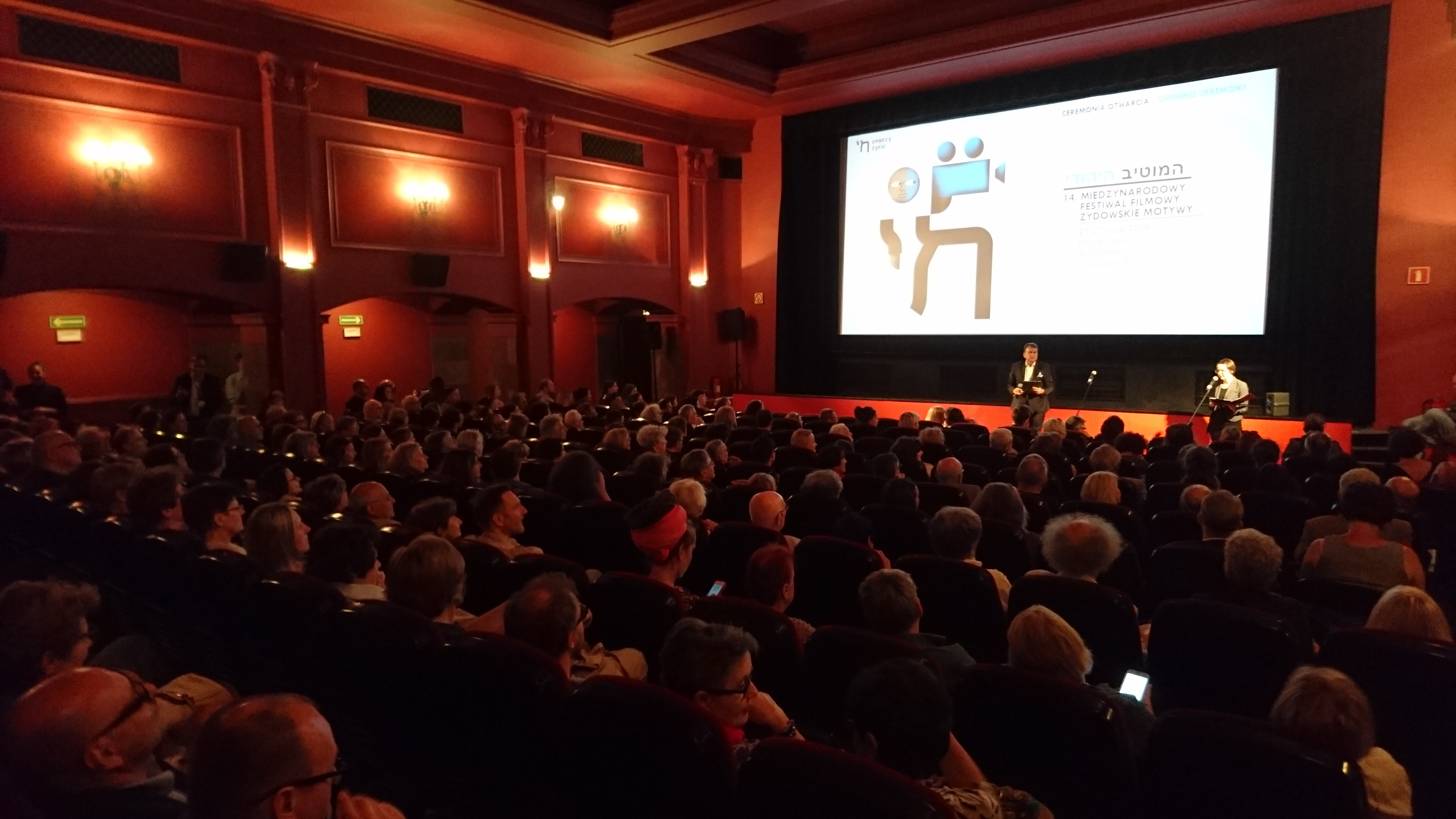
- Opening film: Marek Edelman …And There Was Love In The Ghetto
- Location: Warsaw, Poland
- Founded: 2003
- Awards: Warsaw Phoenix
- Directors: Mirek Chojecki- director, Magdalena Łazarkiewicz - art director
- Hosted by: Jewish Motifs Association
- Festival date: in 2019: 11–15 September (usually April/May)
- Language: Polish; English
- Website: JewishMotifs.org.pl

Jewish Motifs International Film Festival (Polish: Międzynarodowy Festiwal Filmowy Żydowskie Motywy) is a major Jewish-themed film festival held annually in Warsaw, Poland. The festival has been held every year since 2004.

"The biggest European festival focused on Jewish themes in contemporary cinematography"—according to the Polish Embassy in Bern.

The 15th edition is scheduled to take place in mid-September 2019. Initially the festival dates were around the anniversary of the Warsaw Ghetto Uprising; that is why the precise dates are changing but always in the same season (usually in April), since 2016 the festival takes place in late May. In September an exceptional change in dates occurred, and festival was moved for September.

== Idea ==
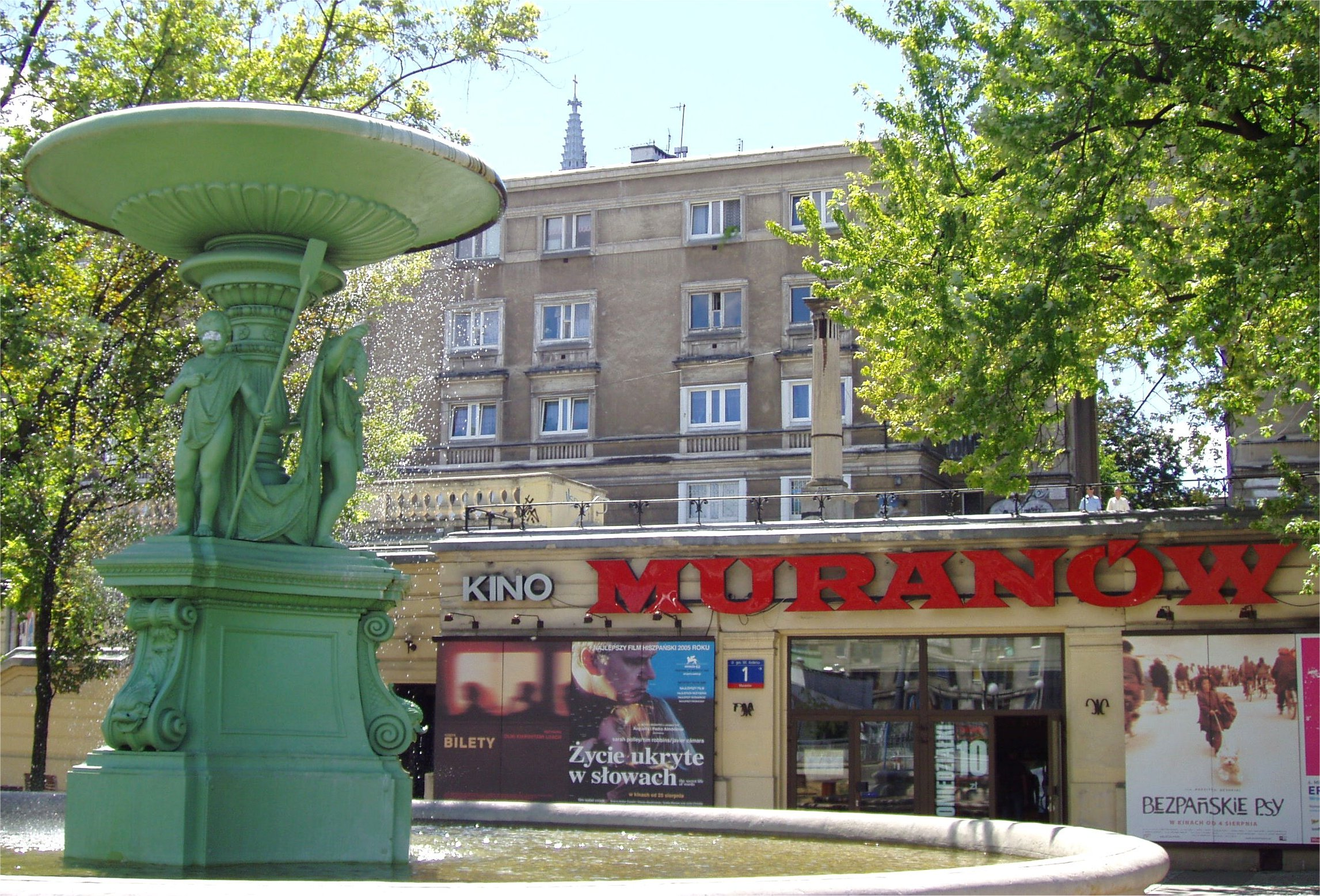
Muranów Cinema in Muranów, Warsaw

The festival organizers declare as the aim and objectives:

- raising awareness on subjects related to "Jewish identity and experience throughout history, to the preservation of Jewish culture and tradition as a source of Judeo-Christian civilization – through the art of cinema";
- promote films on Jewish culture "to reach the young audience who is confronted today with the complex problems of our times, such as terrorism, intolerance and hatred";
- "Through artistic expression in the form of films we want to find ways of communicating with all religious, national and cultural communities in order to better know each other and better understand their diverse motives." especially when emphasizing common elements.
- "Present non-profit productions, pioneer or seeking new ways of expression, which do not clash with the universal requirement of truth in artistic work."

Special focus of the festival films is on those produced in the Central-Eastern European region. Active participation of the audience is specialty of the festival, which organizes direct meetings with the film directors after each screening. Organizers and other experts participate also in the debates and meetings accompanying the shows and post-festival shows, which gives them opportunity for direct interaction. That is why the festival is often described as direct networking meeting and not the festival of red carpets.

The festival partners with other similar Jewish film festivals in Brighton, Vienna and Stockholm.

== History ==
The festival was organized for the first time in 2004.

According to its director, Mirek Chojecki, it was supposed to be one-time event aiming in presenting tradition of the Jewish cinema, from pre-war Yiddish movies made in Poland up to modern cinema of the 21st century. The festival received such positive attention both from international guests and Polish local audience that at the closing ceremony Chojecki said "see you next year" and this promise he keeps continuing. The "Jewish Motifs" festival became an annual event but only since 2004 as International Film Festival ("Jewish Motifs" International Film Festival).

Traditionally the opening and closing ceremonies are led by Andrzej Wajda (Polish film director) and (Polish-Jewish writer) Józef Hen.

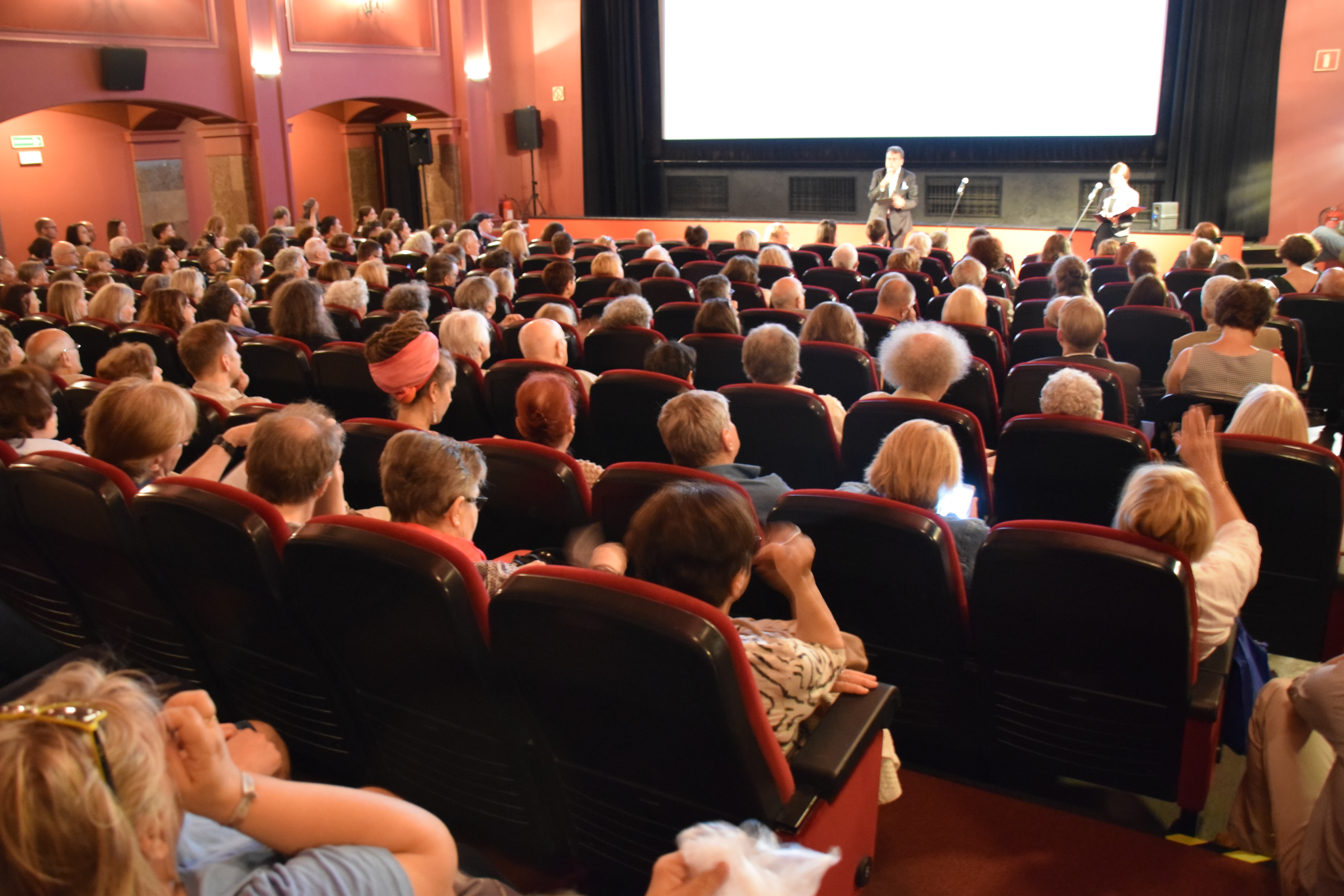

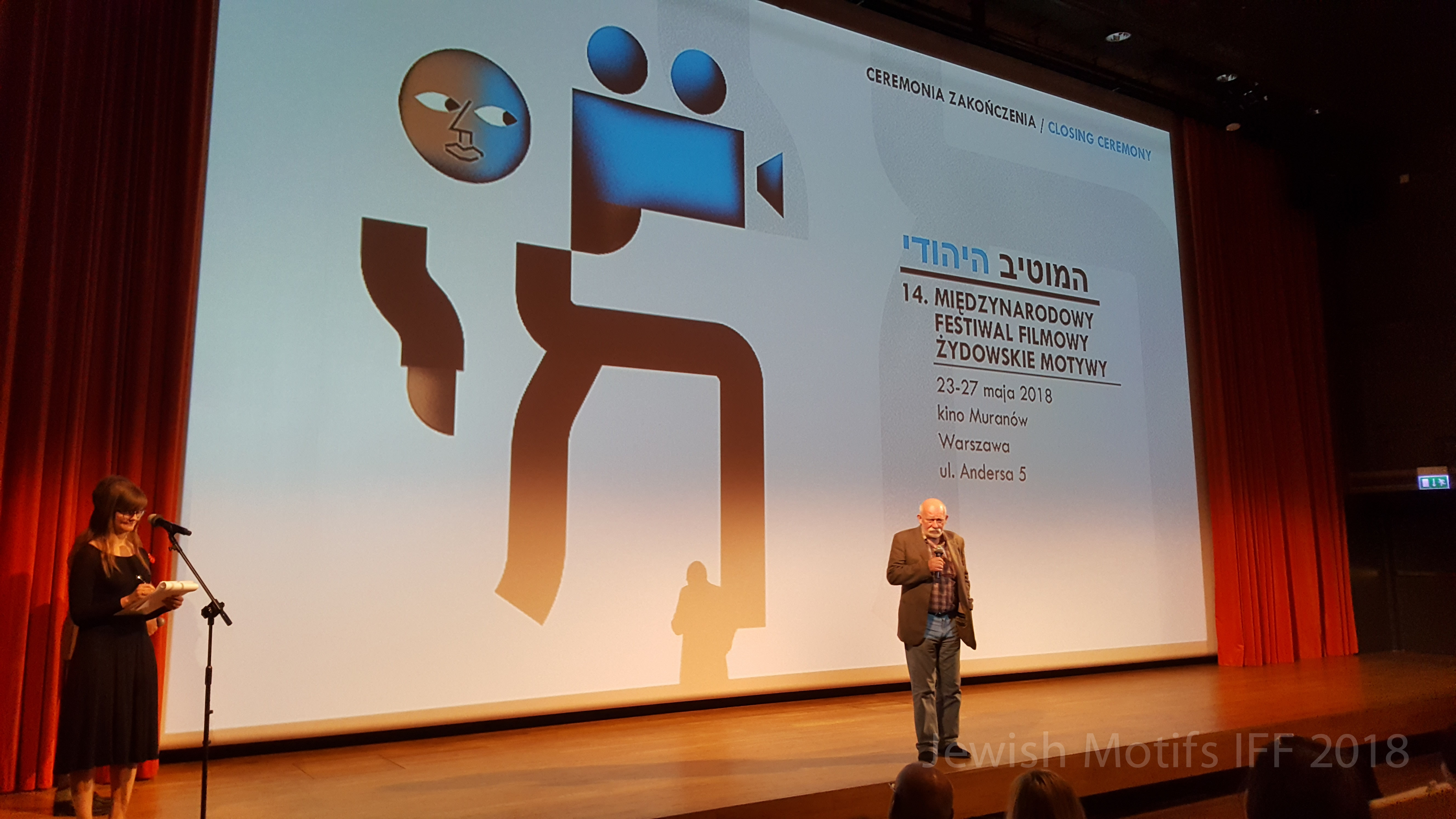

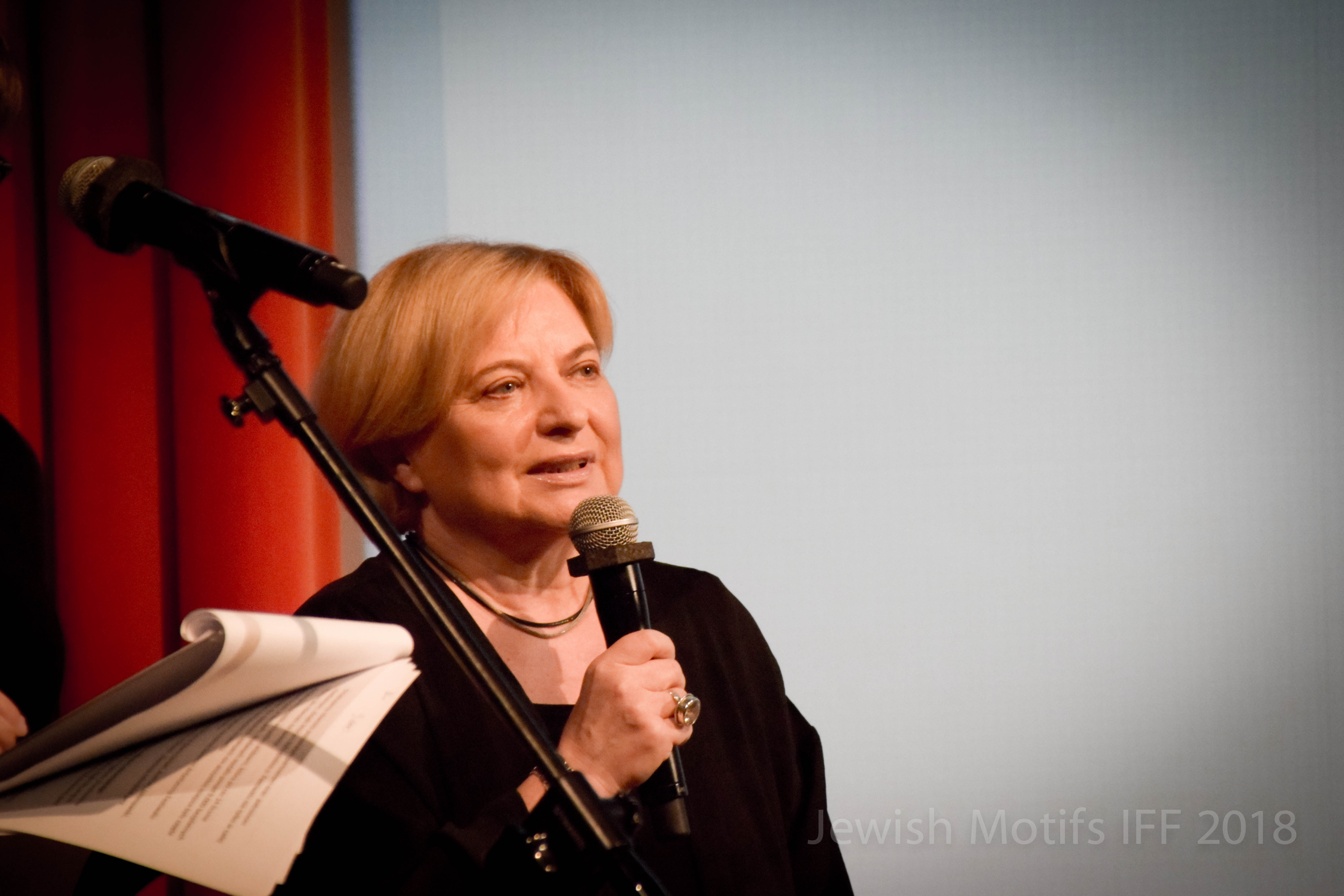

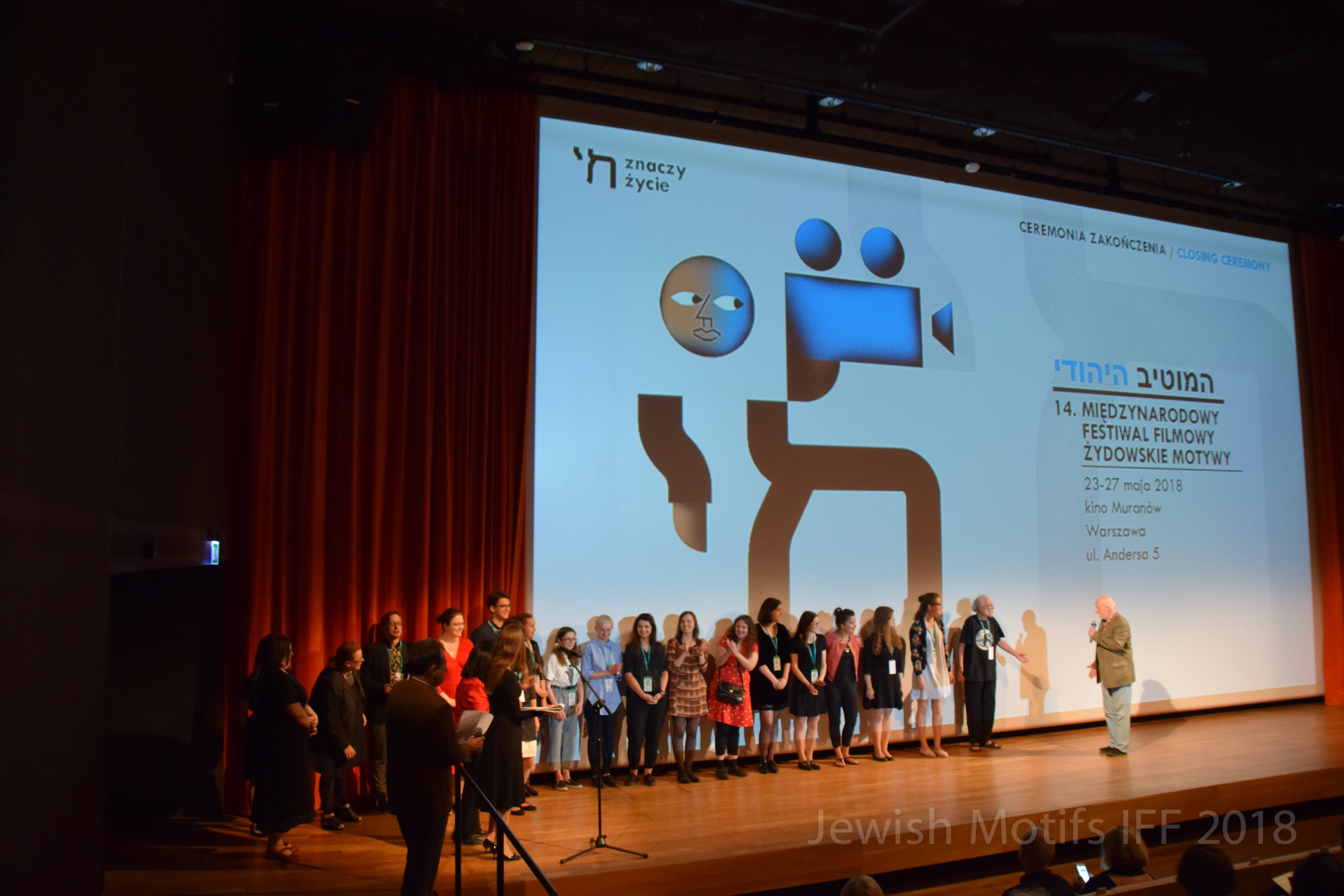

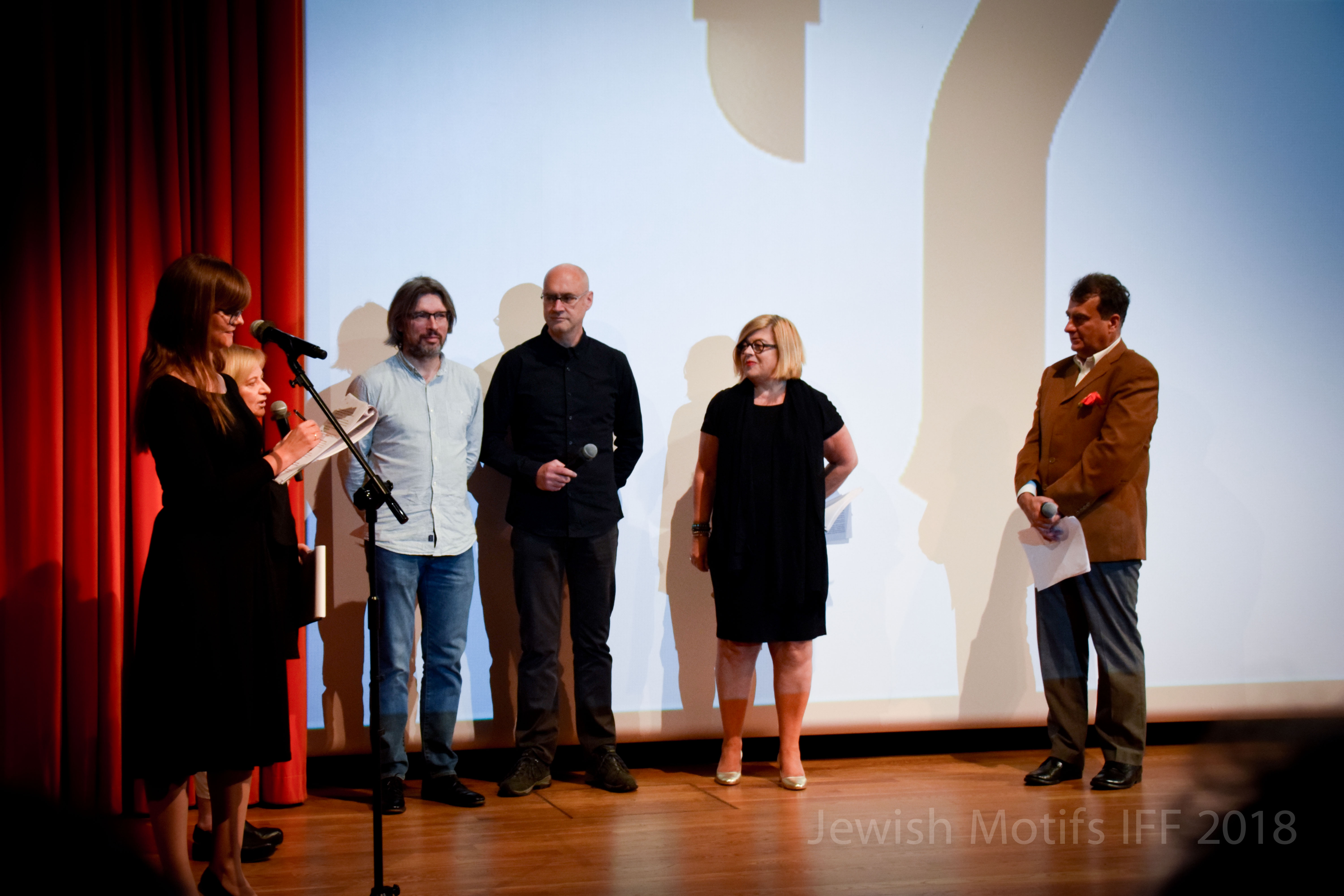

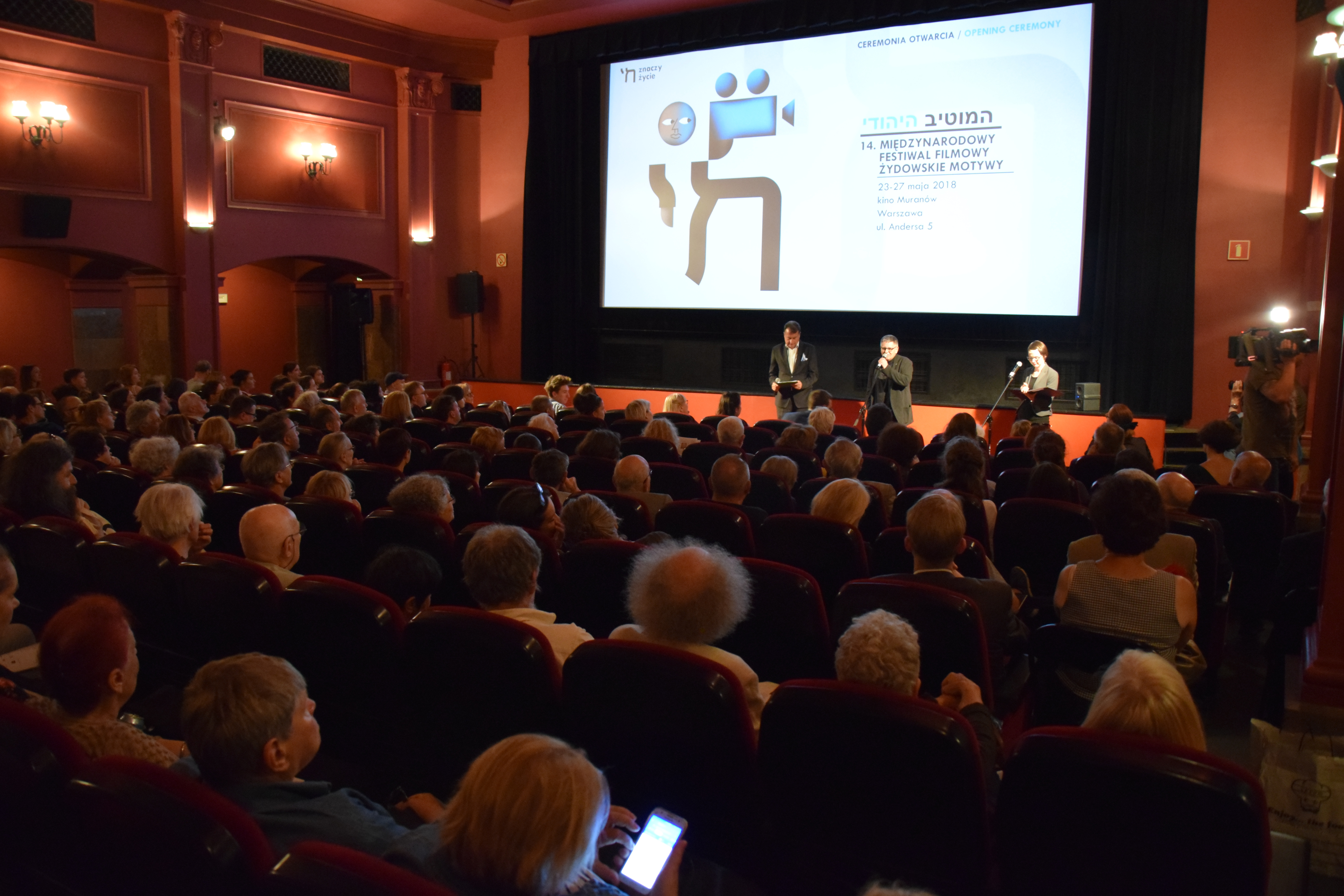

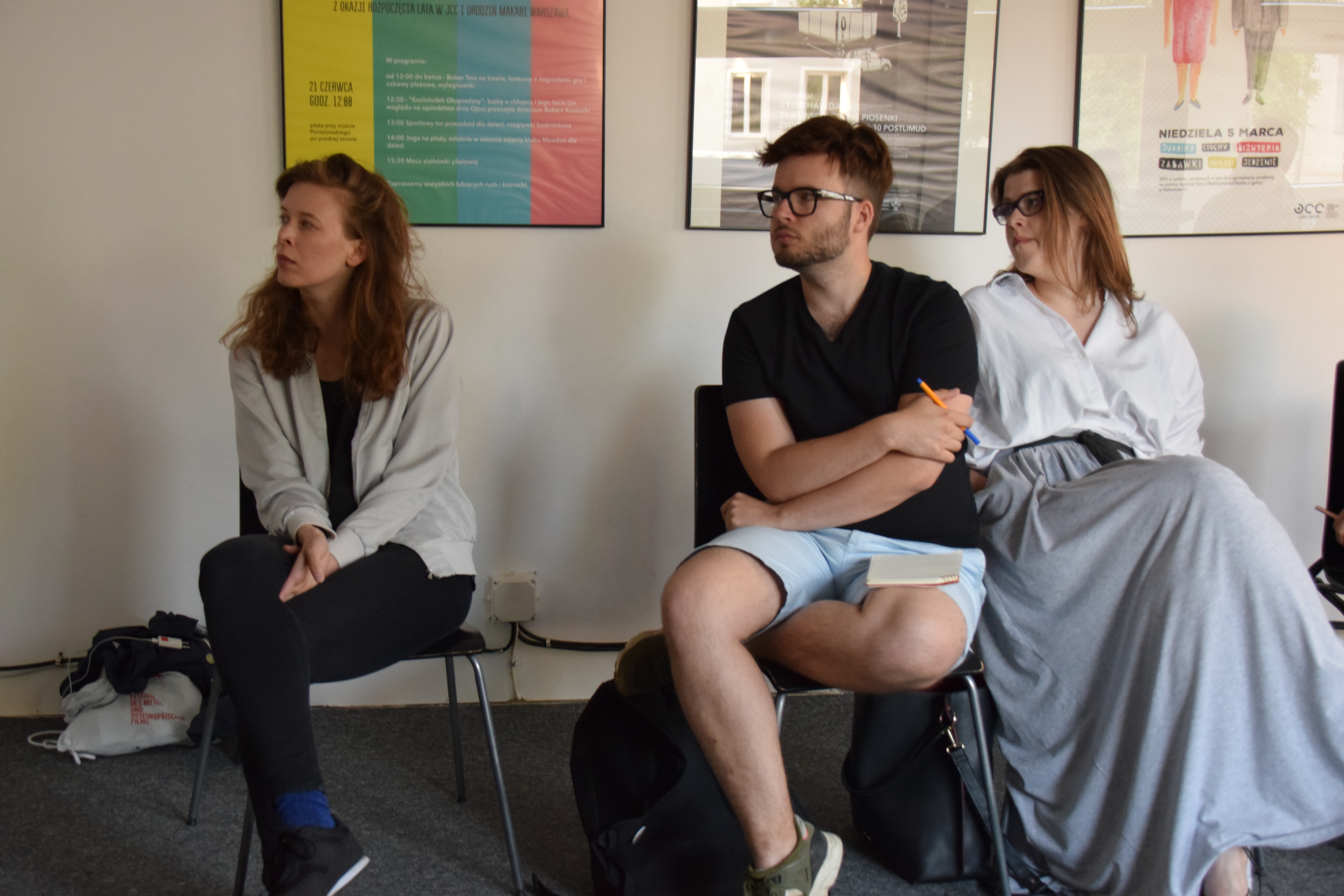

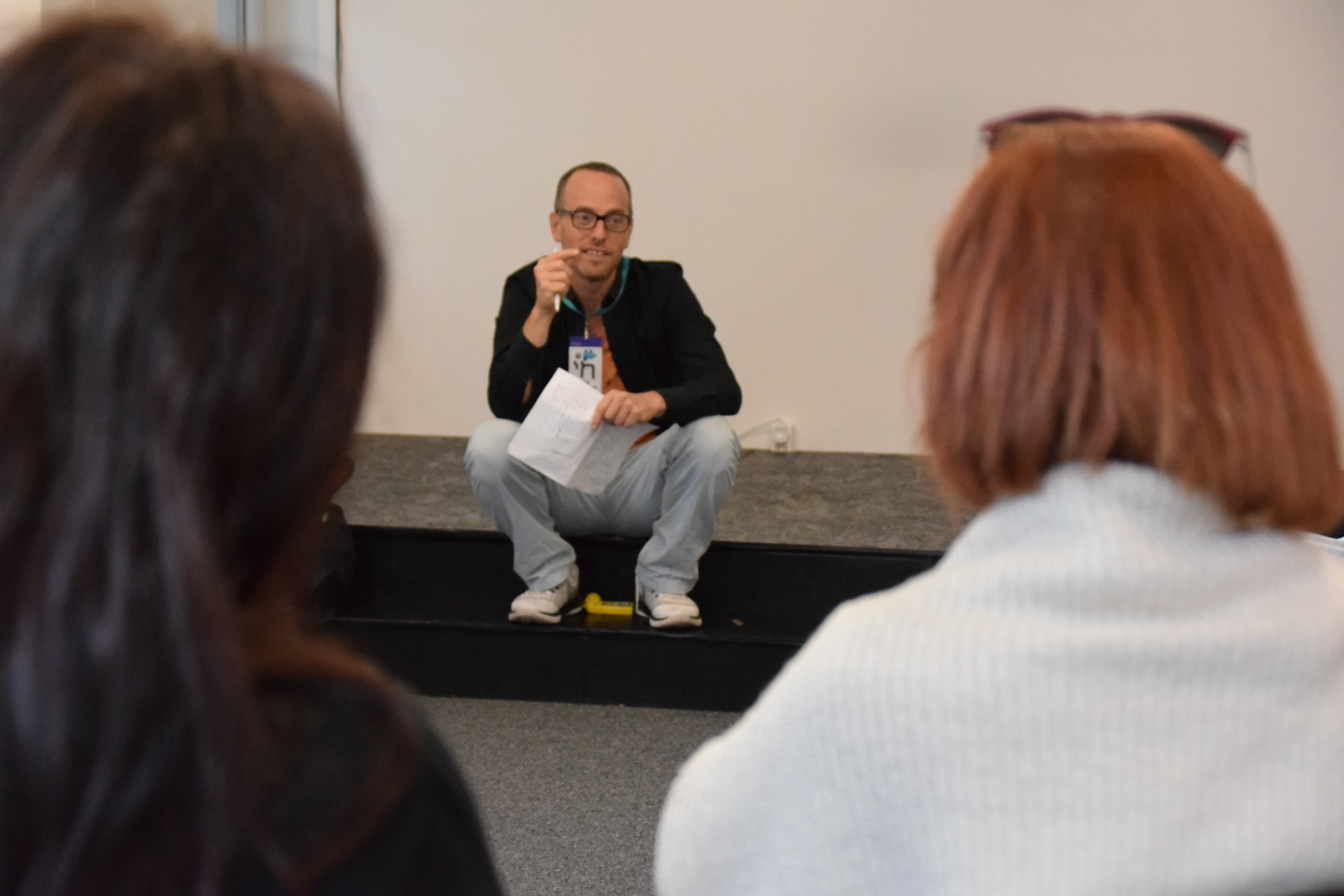

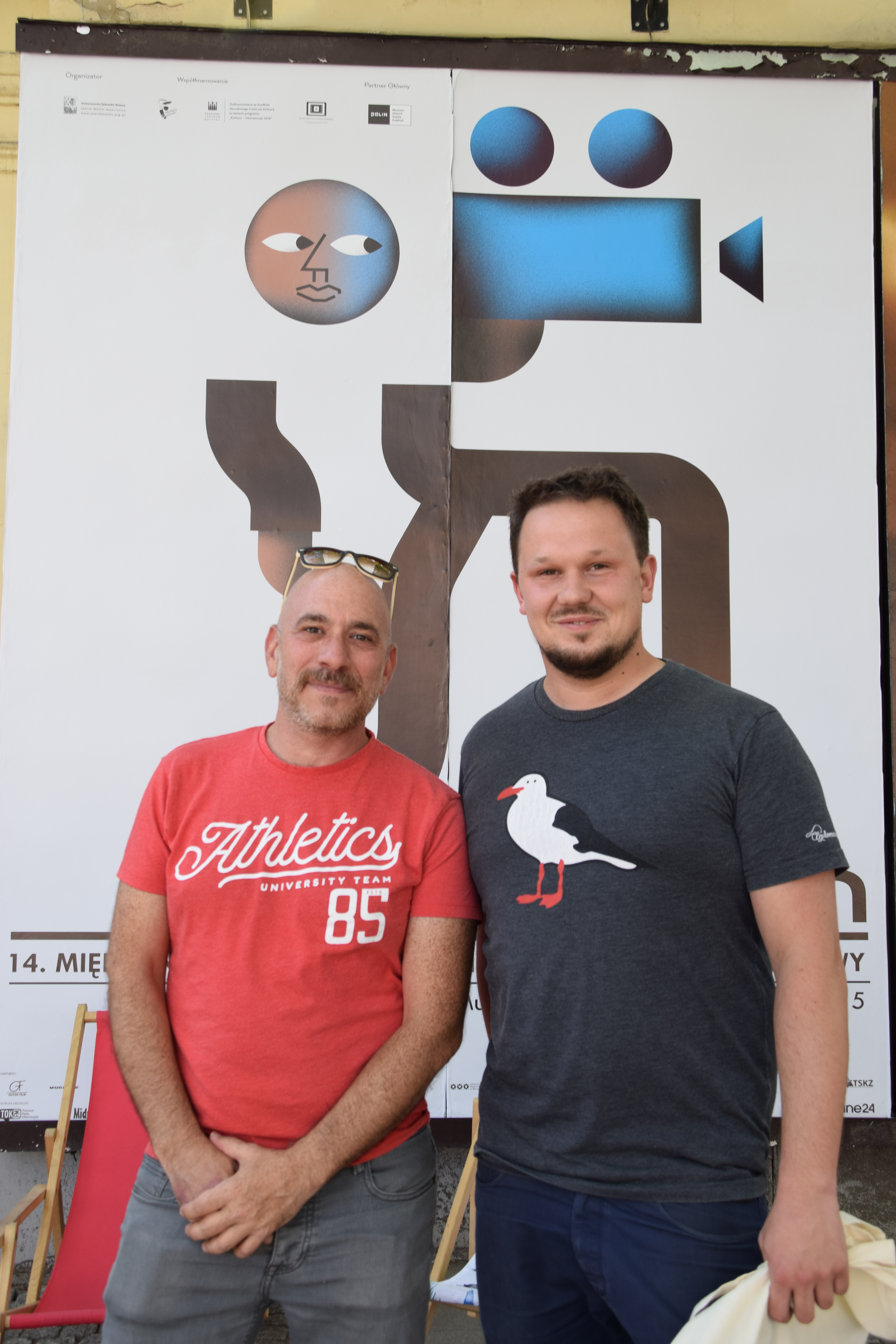

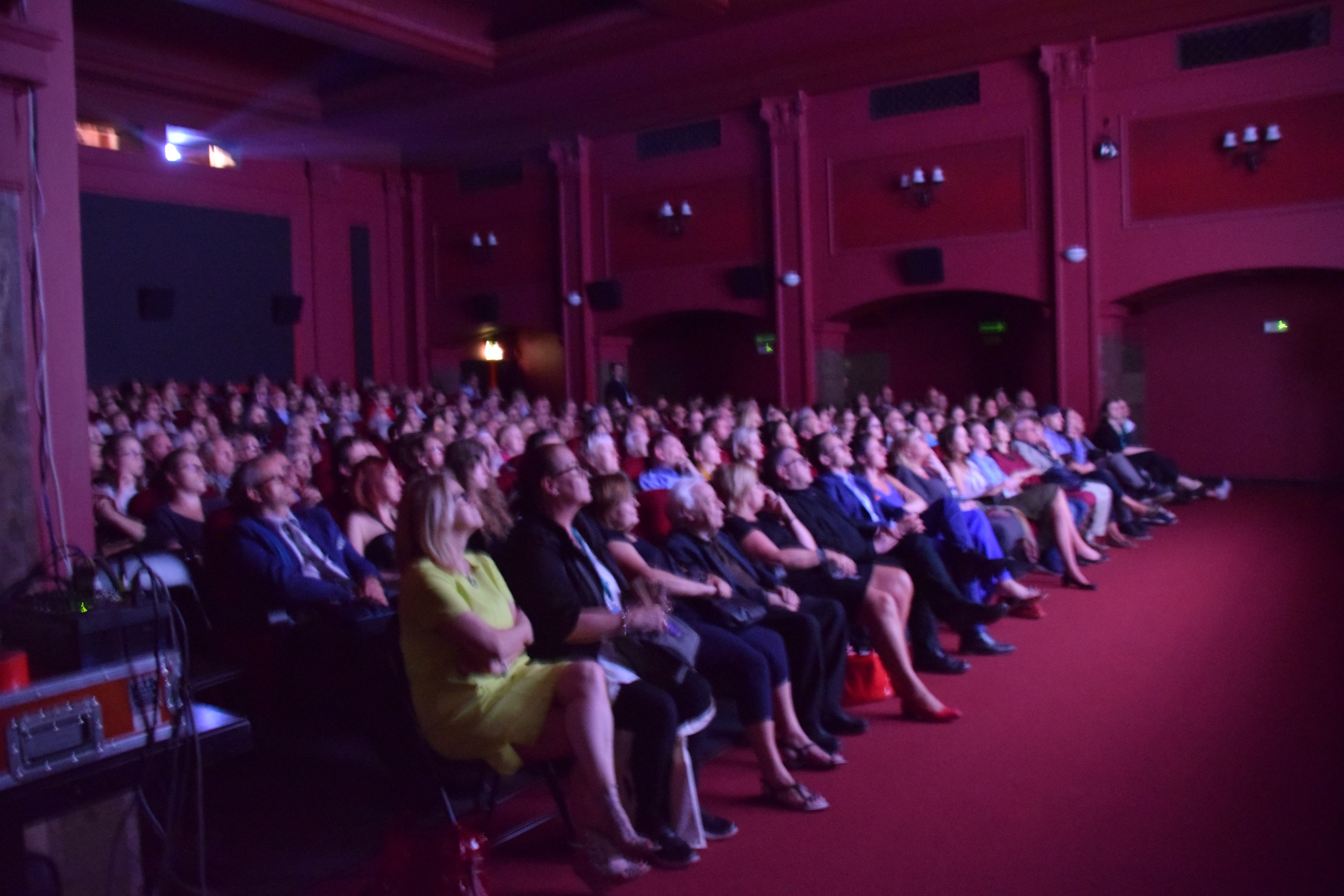

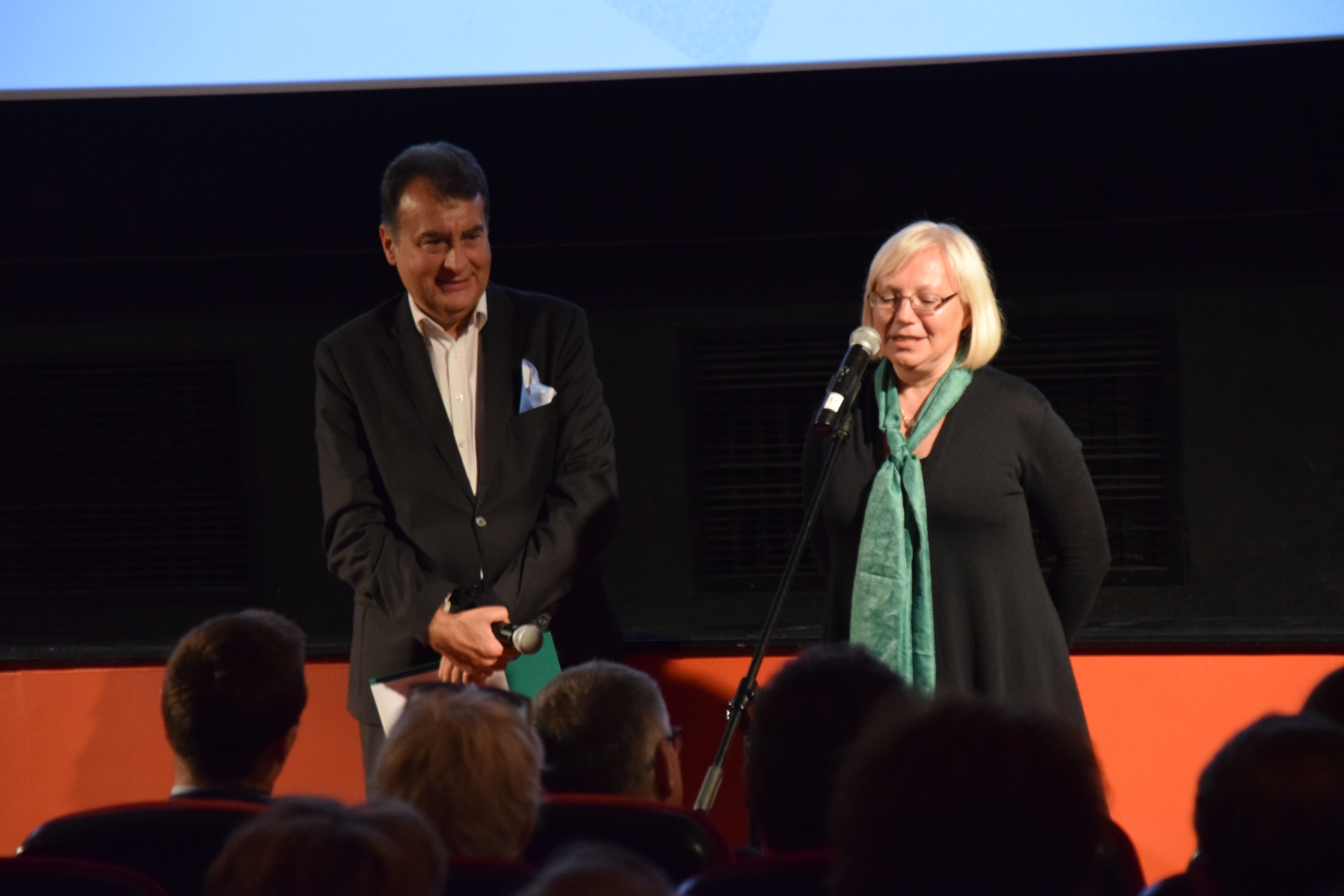

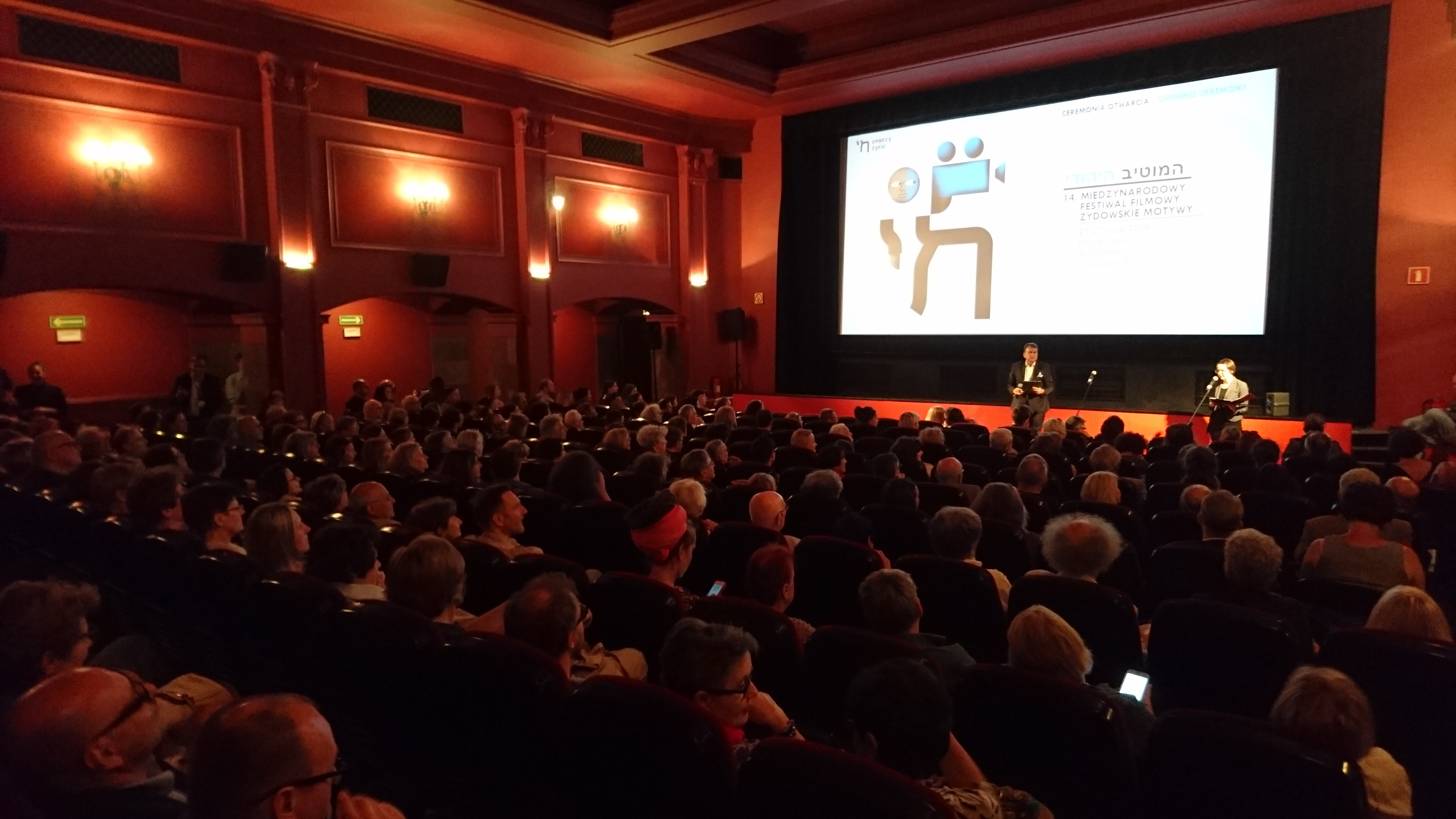

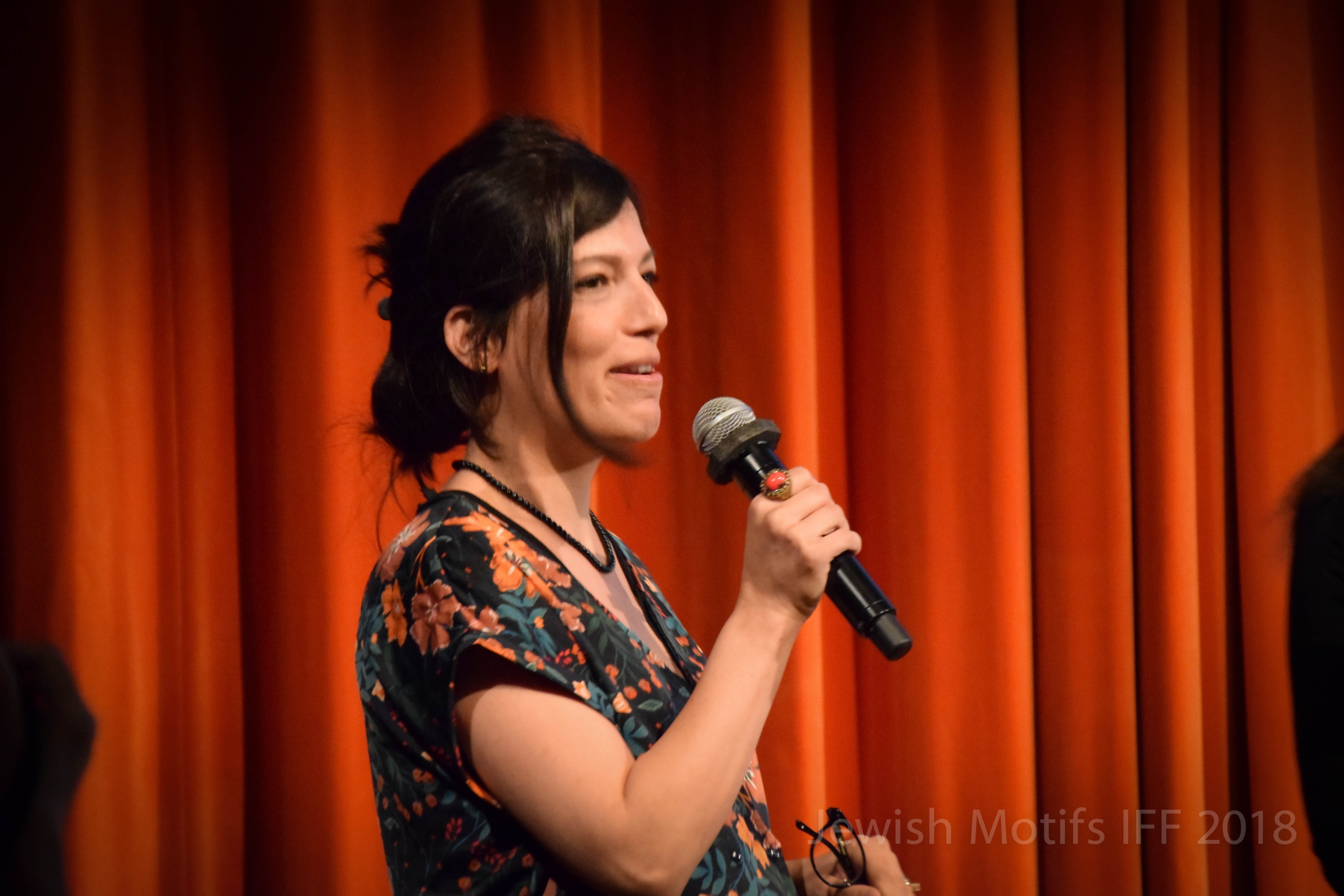

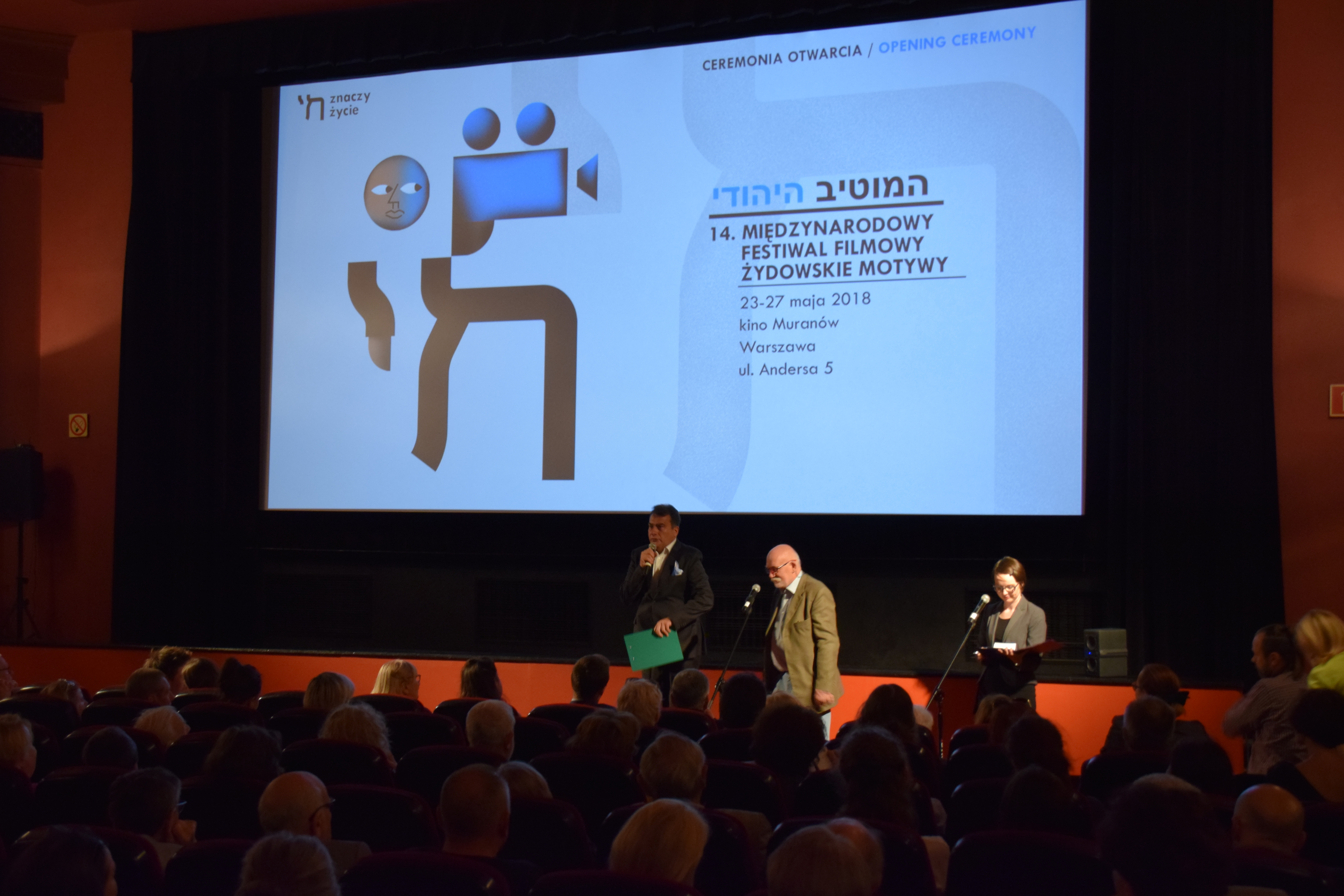

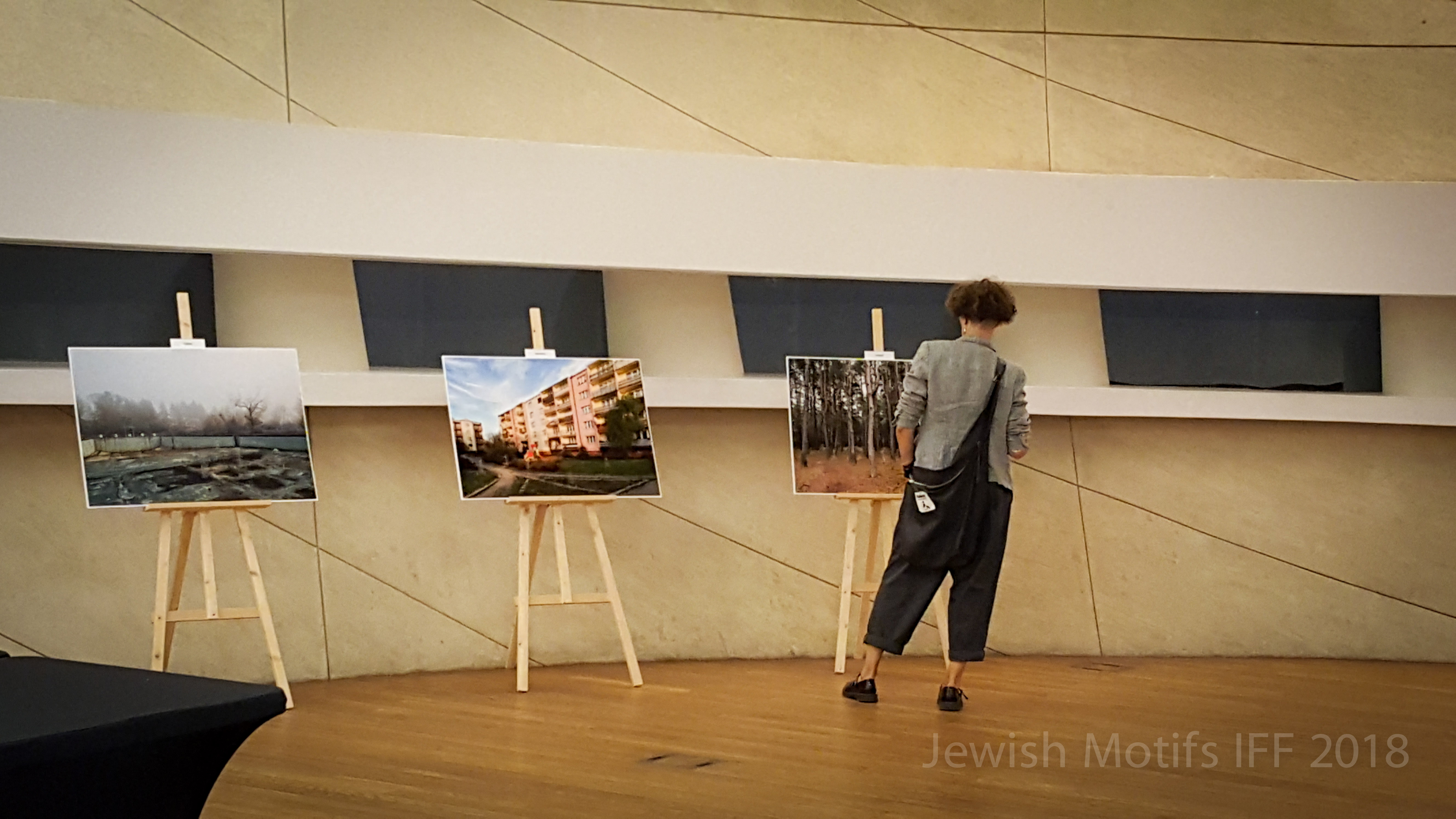

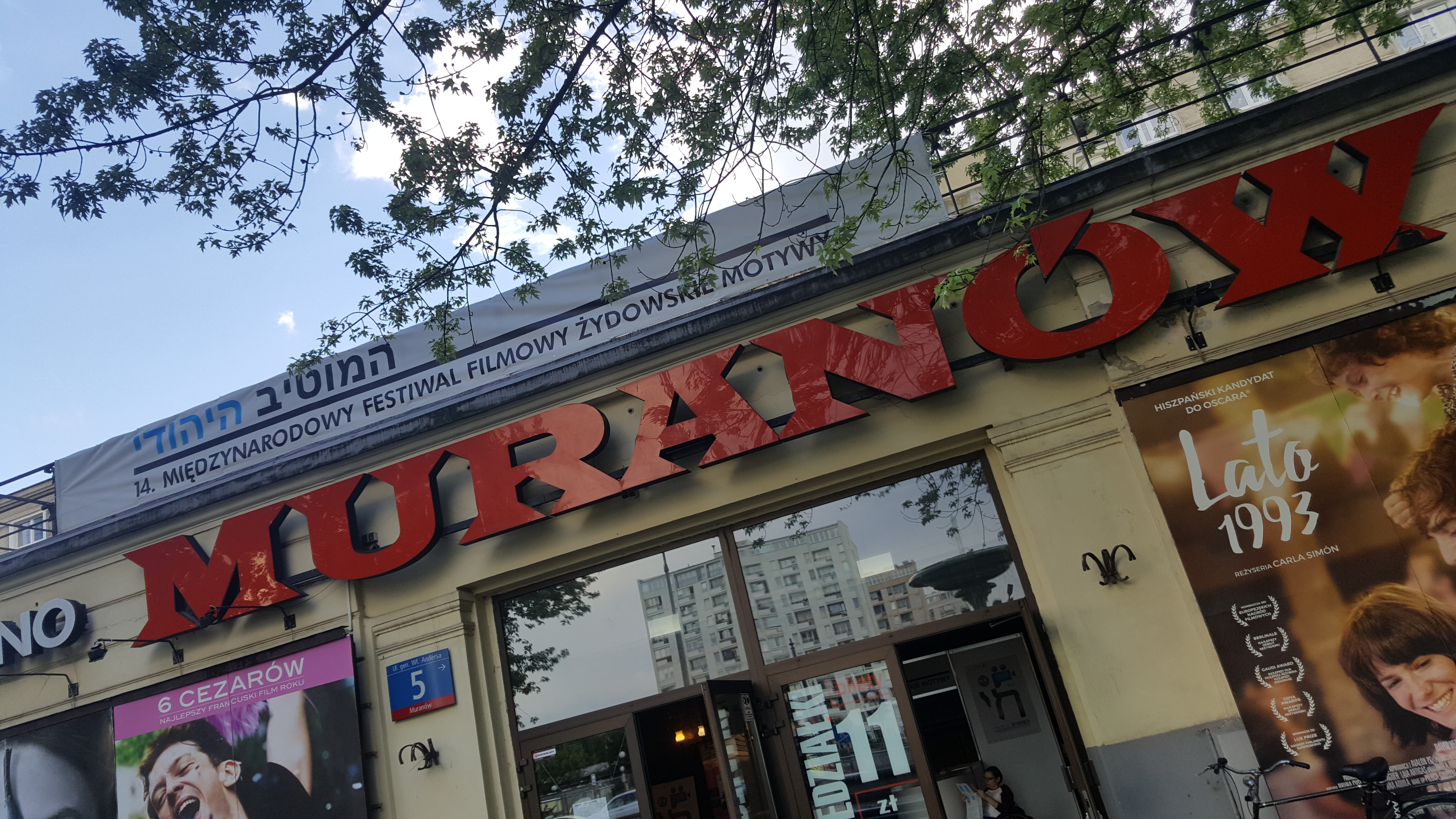

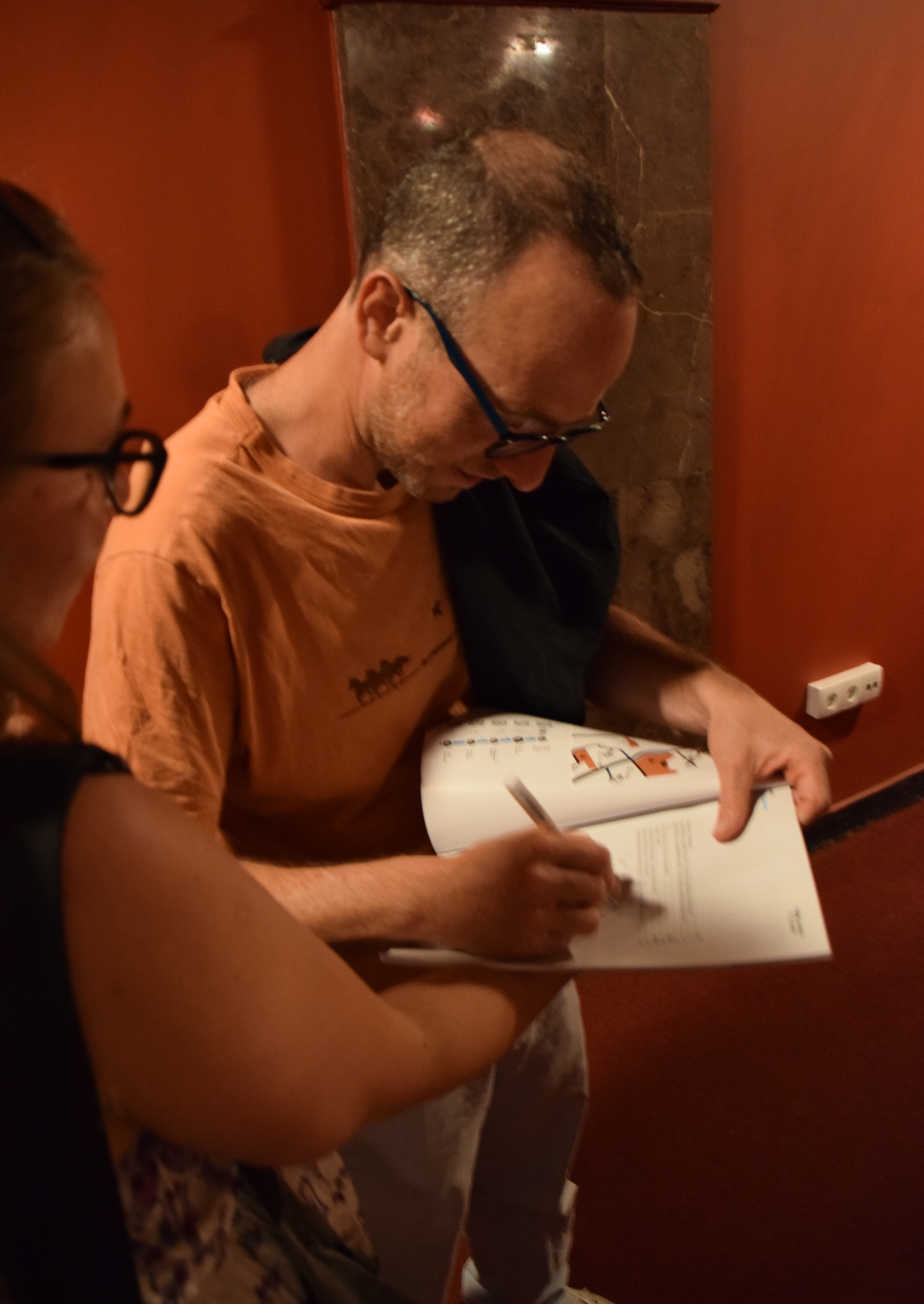

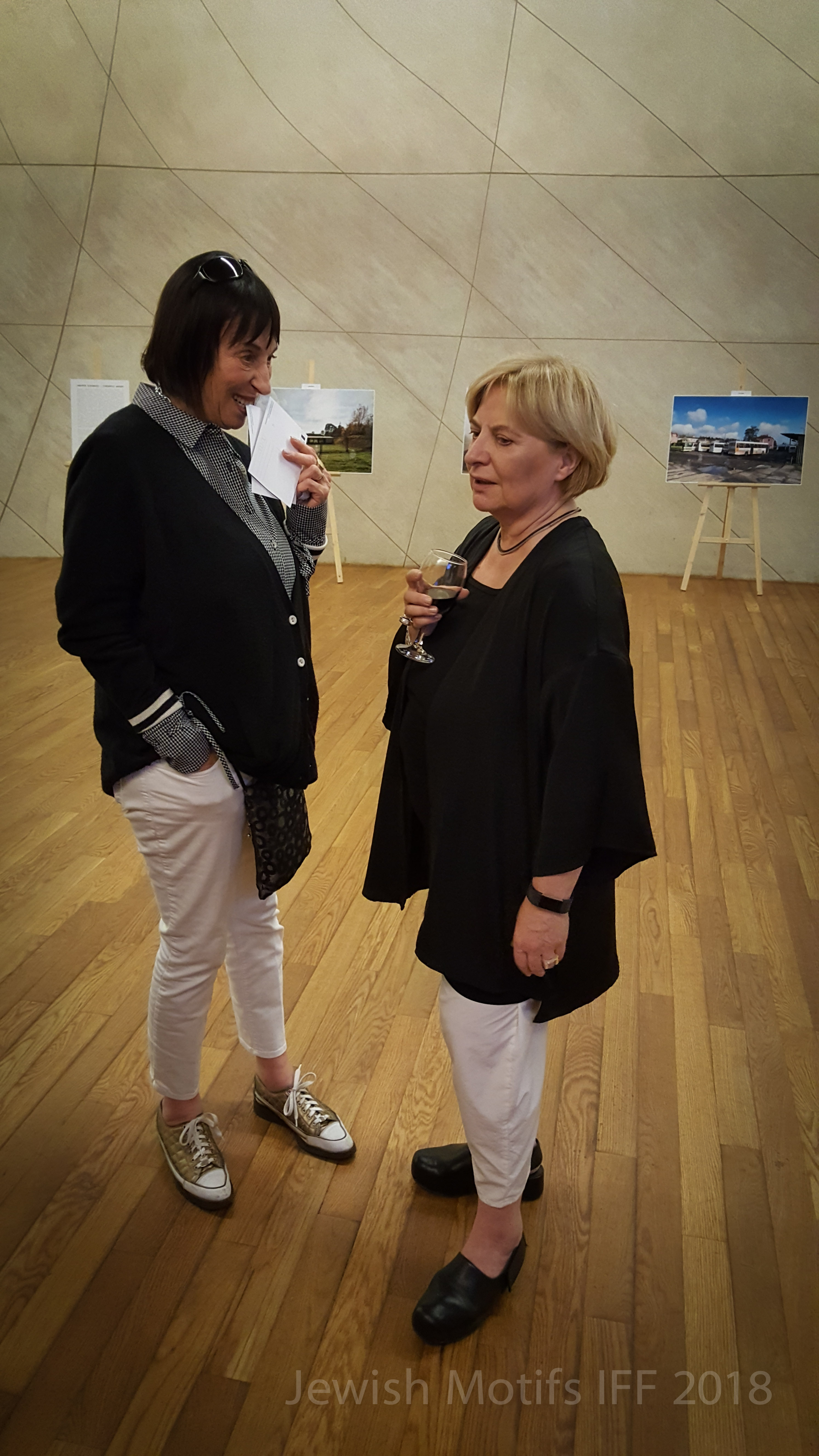

=== Date ===
From the beginning, the festival has taken place regularly in Spring, around the anniversary of the Warsaw Ghetto Uprising in 1943 – which is celebrated as according to the Hebrew (not Julian) calendar.

Festival's edition	Year	Festival dates
1	2004	18-27 April
2	2005	19–24 May
3	2006	11–16 May
4	2007	5–10 May
5	2008	22–27 April
6	2009	28 April – 3 May
7	2010	20–25 April
–	2011	(this year festival has not happened)
8	2012	25–29 April
9	2013	24–28 April
10	2014	23–27 April
11	2015	8–10 May
12	2016	18–22 May
13	2017	24–28 May
14	2018	23–27 May
15	2019	11–15 September

=== "Jewish Motifs" Association ===
"Jewish Motifs" Association
- Formation: 2004
- Headquarters: ul. Wilcza 12C, PL 00-532 Warsaw, Poland
- Official language: Polish
- President: Ewa Szprynger
- Website: Jewish Motifs Association

In 2004 the group of organizers of first event has founded The Jewish Motifs Association which is a nonprofit organization responsible for organizing further editions of the festival. The association organizes also post-festival shows and promotes festival movies at the other cultural events in Poland.

== Program ==
The program consists of the following sections: feature, documentary, experimental, animation, short.

All the films presented, regardless of the competitive or non-competitive category, are eligible for the Audience Award.

Different educational aspect is learning-through-participation: volunteership and internship program offered by the festival. Each year there were from 15 to 80 participants of volunteer and internship program editions.

In 2018, at its 14th edition, the festival organized a masterclass workshop in film making led by Israeli document films director and producer Barak Heymann.

Each year the festival is also accompanied by additional events: from kosher cuisine cooking workshops to expert debates on recent topics.

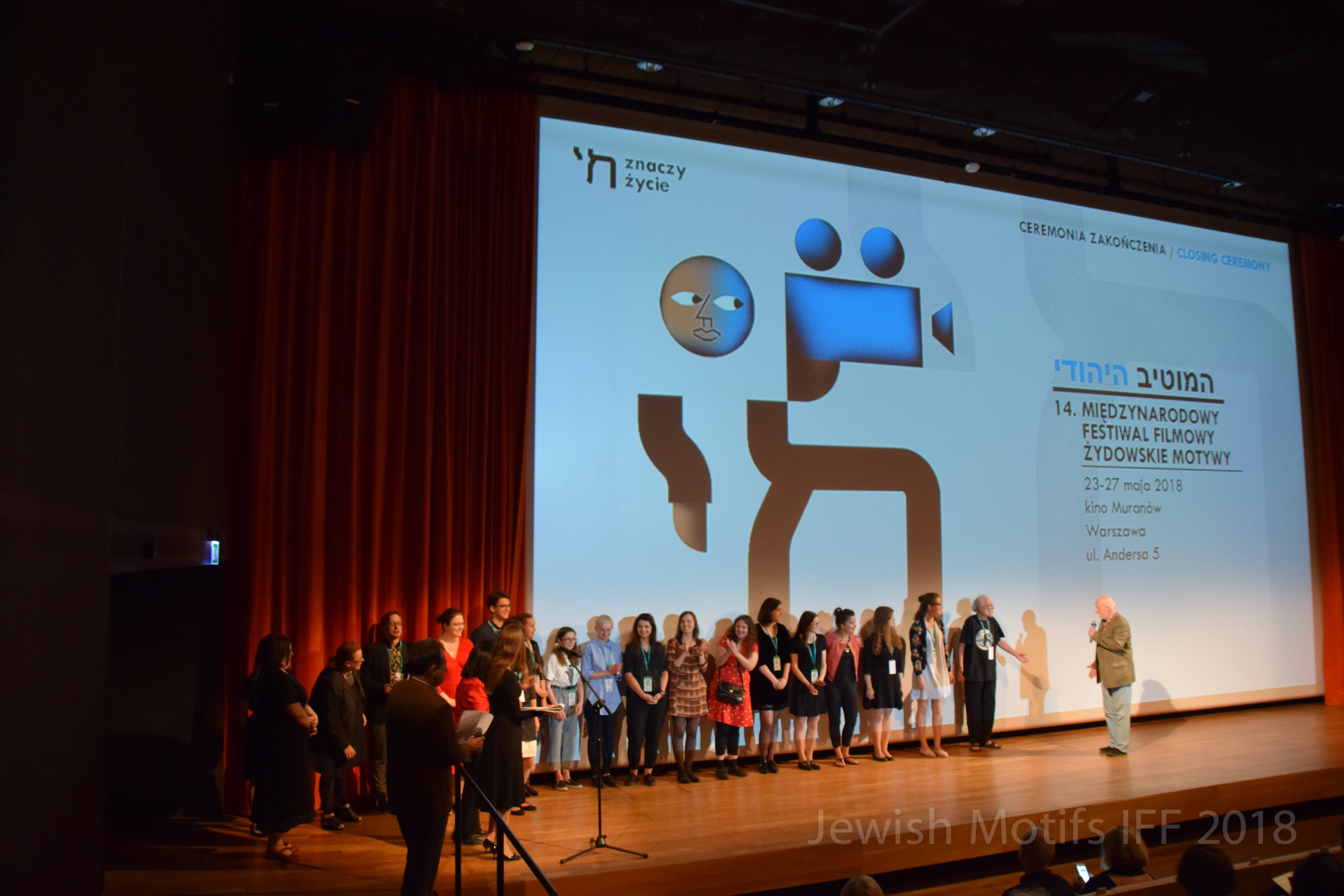

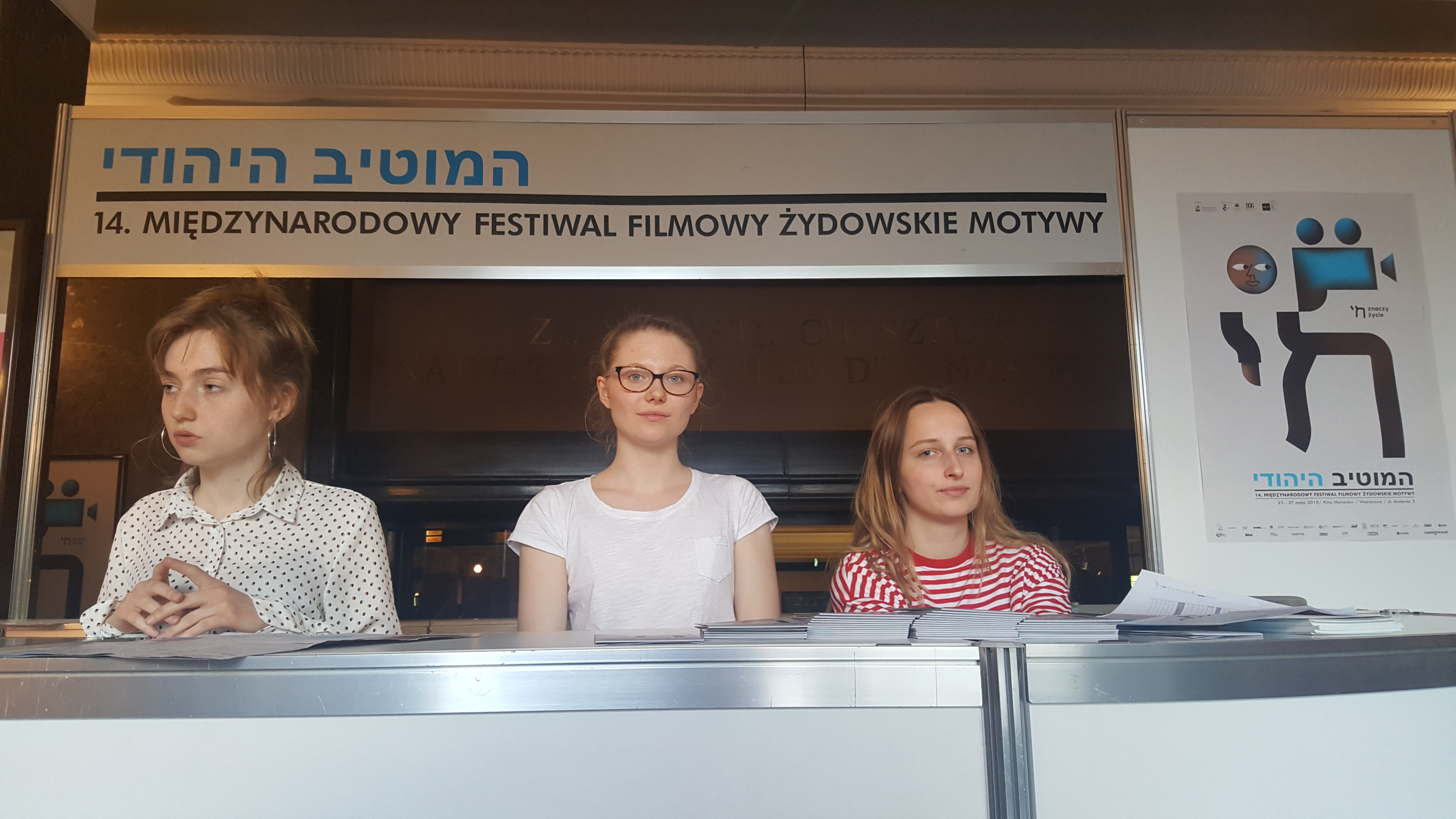

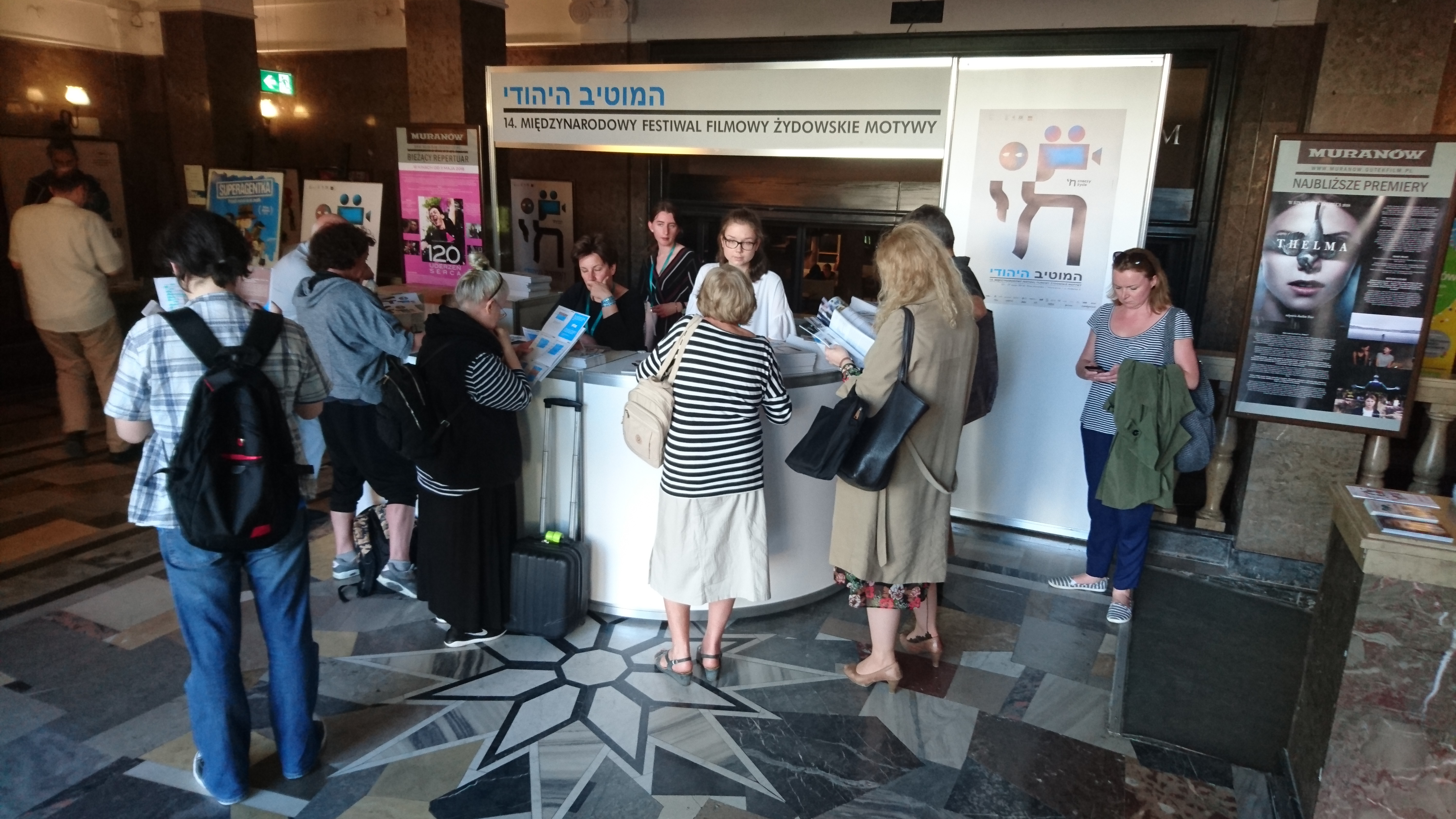

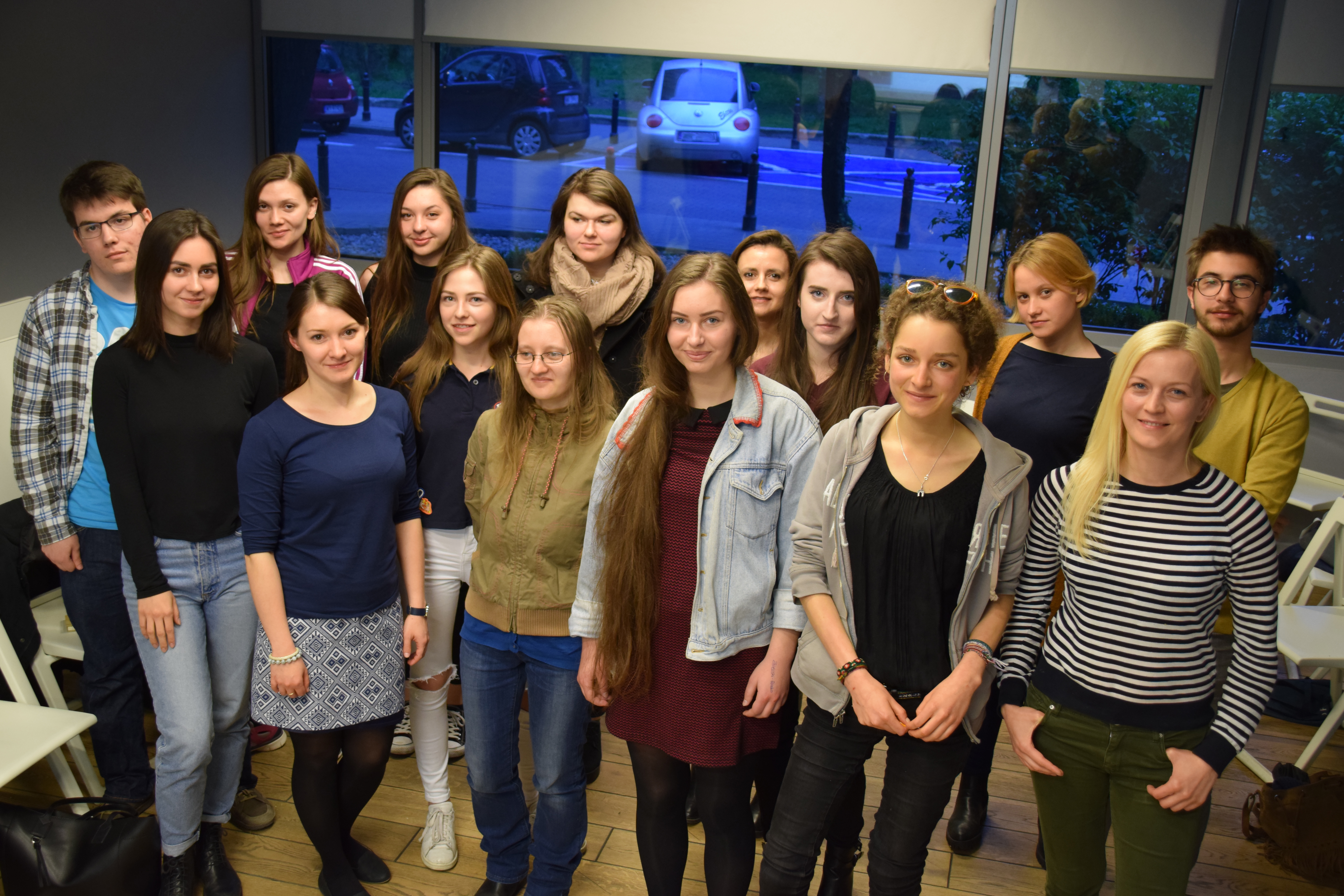

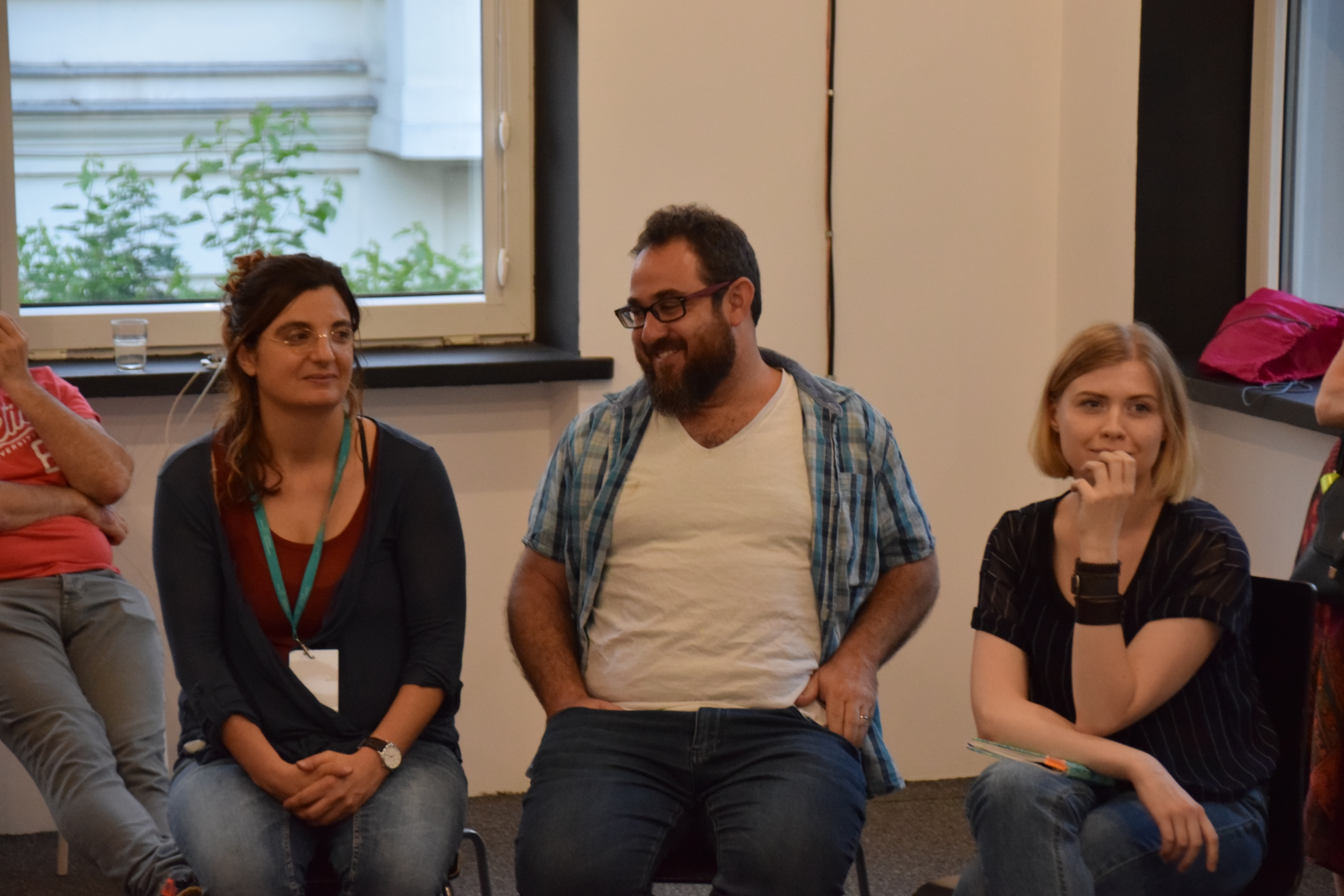

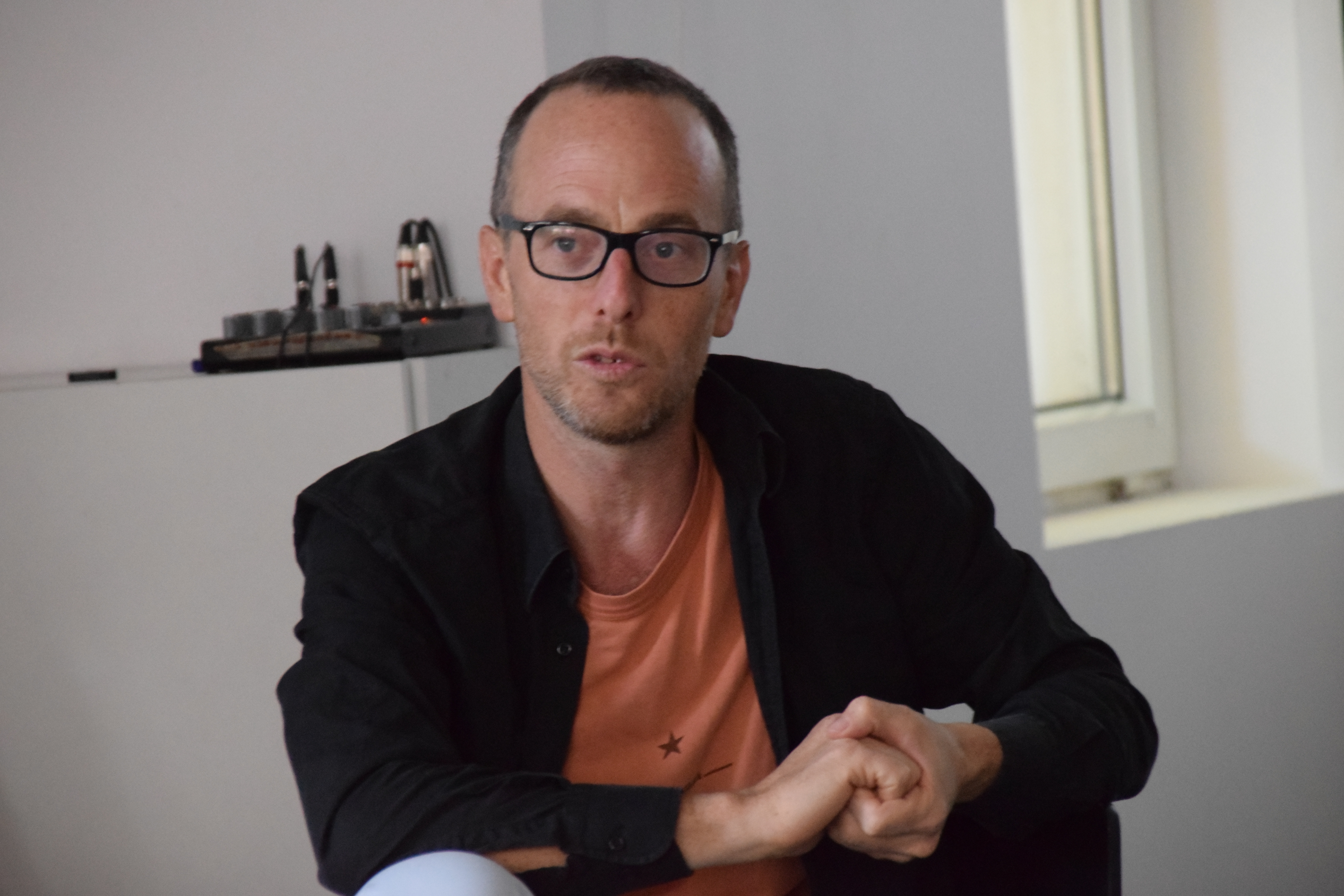

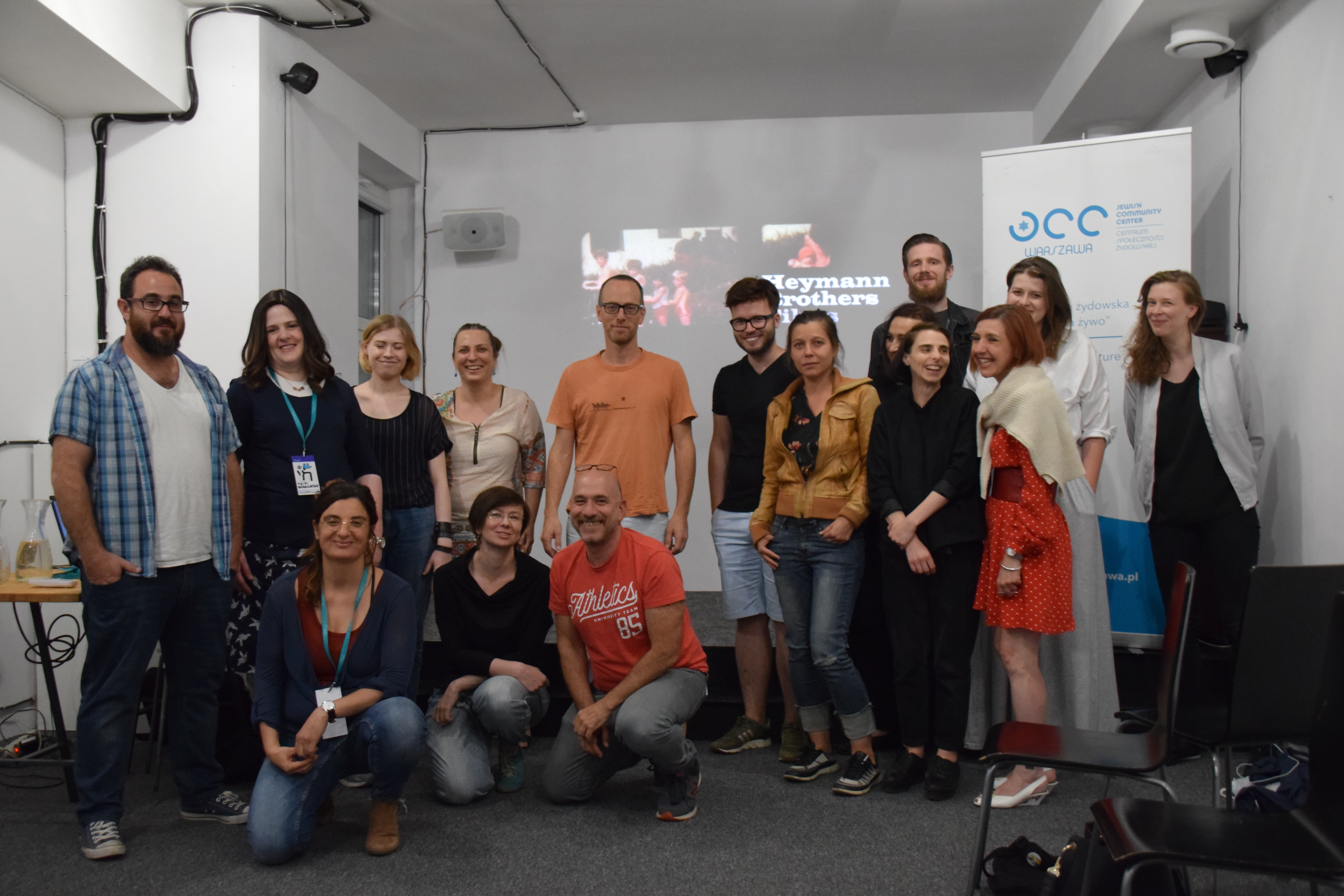

== Guest of Honor ==
- 2006: Claude Lelouch
- 2007: Artur Brauner
- 2008: Janusz Morgenstern
- 2009: Adam Holender
- 2010: Edward Żebrowski
- 2011: n/a
- 2012: Gila Almagor
- 2013: Józef Hen
- 2014: Andrzej Wajda

== Juries ==
- 2004: Miron Chernyenko, Michael Handelzalts, Kurt Weber, Leo Kantor, Edward Zebrowski.
- 2005: Akos Engelmayer, Aryeh Golan-Skornik, Włodek Goldkorn, Sławomir Grunberg, Tadeusz Lubelski.
- 2006: Izabela Cywińska, Aleksander Jochwed, Dmitriy Kabakow, Marek Rozenbaum, Witold Stok.
- 2007: Alona Frankel, Peter Fudakowski, Peter Mostovoy, Yoram Golan, Aleksander Kwiatkowski.
- 2008: Ewa Kuryluk, Tomasz Jastrun, Haim Schreiber, Andrzej Titkow, Aleksander Gutman.
- 2009: Andrzej Wolski, Tadeusz Sobolewski, Vita Żelakeviciute, Wanda Kościa-Rostowska, Yossi Wein.
- 2010: Irina Rubanova, Petruška Šustrova, Barbara Hollender, Ami Drozd, Ludwik Lewin.
- 2011: n/a
- 2012: Benjamin Freidenberg, Tatiana Kosinowa, Gabriele Lesser, Lukáš Přibyl, Andrzej Titkow.
- 2013: Alexandra Szacka, Danae Elon, Jacek Bławut, Olena Babiy, Rafał Listopad.
- 2014: Alon Garbuz, Łukasz Gutt, Maria Zmarz-Koczanowicz, Michał Bregant, Paweł Felis.
- 2015: Borys Lankosz, Magdalena Łazarkiewicz, Jacek Petrycki.
- 2016: Anna Kazejak, Paweł Łoziński, Łukasz Maciejewski.
- 2017: Joanna Kos-Krauze, fr Andrzej Luter, Anna Zamecka
- 2018: Beata Chmiel, Andrzej Jakimowski, Adam Bajerski.
- 2019: Beata Chmiel, Cezary Harasimowicz, Natalia Koryncka-Gruz.

== Award winners ==
Awards are in several categories:

- Warsaw Phoenix:
  - Golden Warsaw Phoenix (Grand Prix)
    - Warsaw Phoenix
      - for the best feature film,
      - for the best documentary film,
      - for the best experimental film / best short;
- Audience Award (since 2005);
- special awards:
  - The Ger Mandolin Orchestra Award (awarded in the years 2010–2016),
  - Antoni Marianowicz Award for the best Polish film (funded by Association of Authors ZAiKS),
  - Award funded by the Jewish Community of Warsaw for the best presentation of contemporary Jewish life in film.
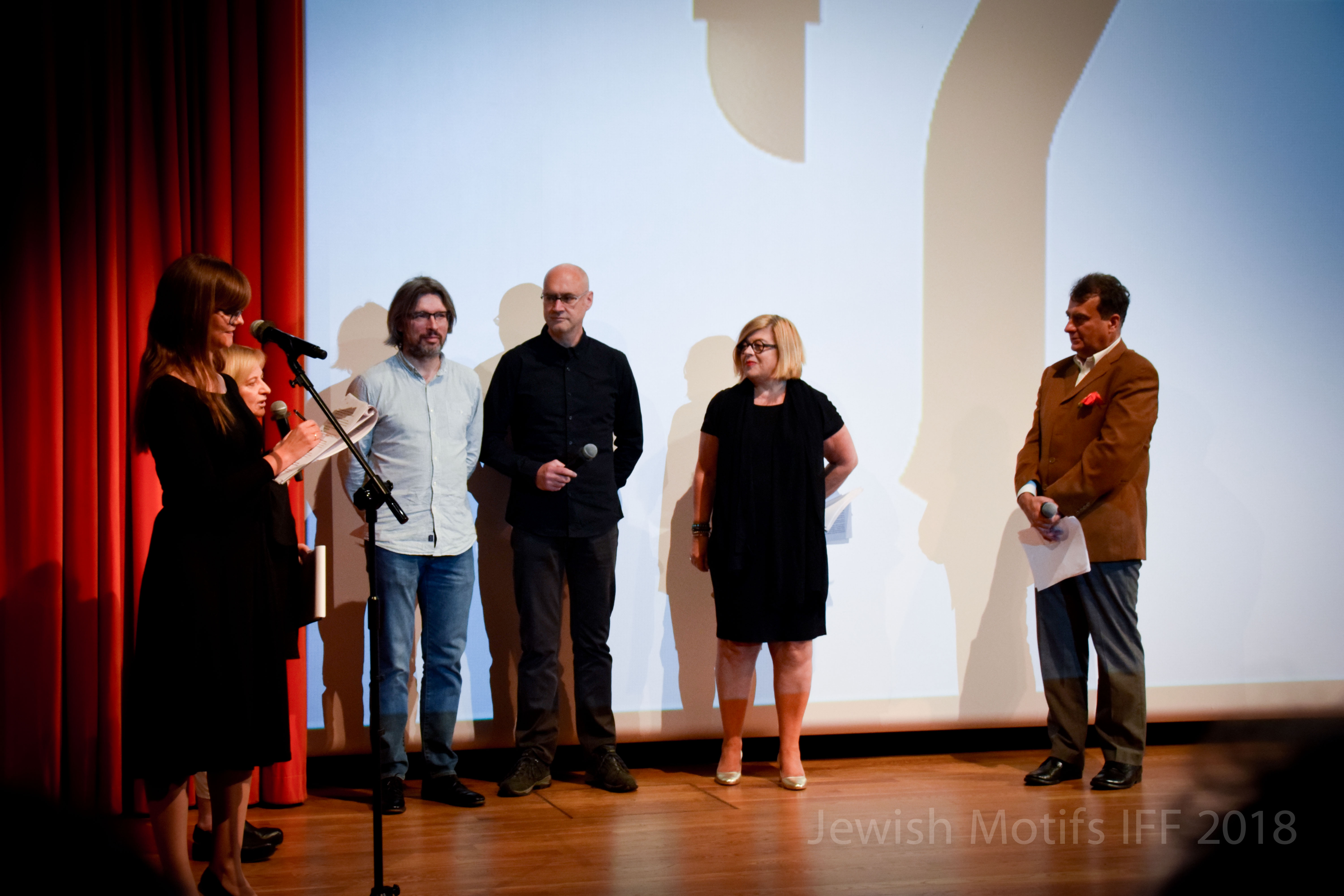

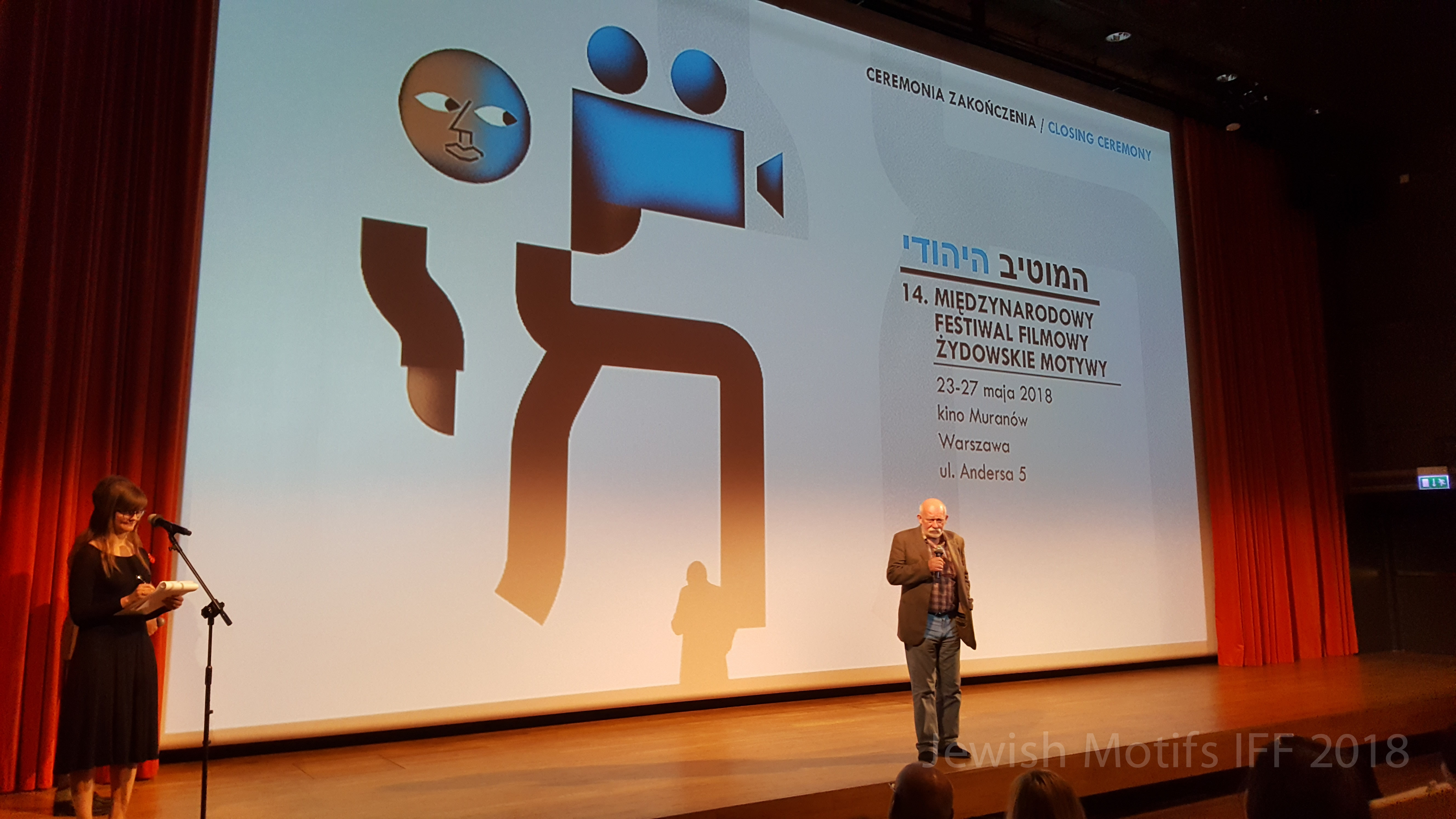

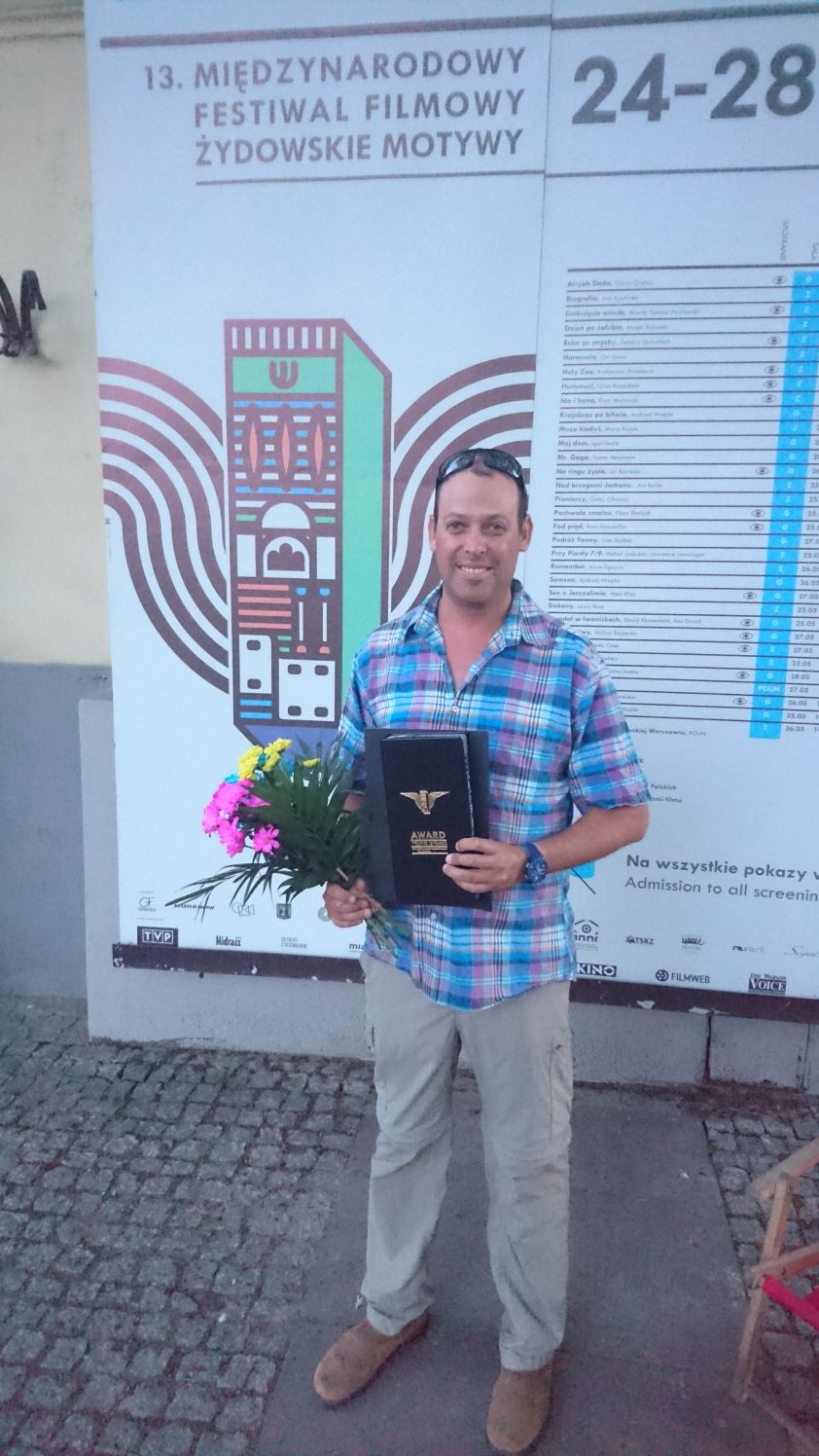

=== Warsaw Phoenix award ===
==== Golden Warsaw Phoenix (Grand Prix) ====
Year	Film	Original Title	Director	Country
2004	Hiding and Seeking		Oren Rudavsky, Menachem Daum	Israel
2005	Rosenstrasse		Margarethe von Trotta	Germany
2006	Portrait Photographer	Portrecista	Ireneusz Dobrowolski	Poland
2007	I only wanted to live		Mimmo Calopresti	Italy
2008	To Die in Jerusalem		Hilla Medalia	Israel
2009	Po-lin		Jolanta Dylewska	Poland
2010	The Gift to Stalin		Rustem Abdrashov	Kazakhstan
2011				
2012	Konserwator	Boker tov adon Fidelman	Yossi Madmony	Israel
2013	The Flat		Arnon Goldfinger	Israel
2014	Soldier on the Roof		Esther Hertog	Israel
2015	Gett: The Trial of Viviane Amsalem		Ronit Elkabetz, Shlomi Elkabetz	Israel
2016	The Kozalchic Affair		Roni Ninio	Israel
2017	Bogdan's Journey	Przy Planty 7/9	Michał Jaskulski, Lawrence Loewinger	Poland
2018	Scarred Hearts		Radu Jude	Romania Germany
2019	Jonathan Agassi Saved My Life		Tomer Heymann	Germany, Israel

==== Warsaw Phoenix for the best feature film ====
Year	Film	Original Title	Director	Country
2005	silver statuette: Only Human	Seres queridos	Teresa De Pelegri, Dominic Harrari	Spain Argentina
2013	When Day Breaks		Goran Paskaljević	Serbia
2014	Youth		Tom Shoval	Israel
2016	Deamon	Demon	Marcin Wrona	Poland
2017	One Week and A Day	שבוע ויום	Asaph Polonsky	Israel
2018	Scaffolding		Matan Yair	Israel
2019	Longing	געגוע	Savi Gabizon	Israel

==== Warsaw Phoenix for the best documentary film ====
Year	Film	Original Title	Director	Country
2005	silver statuette: Behind the enemy lines		Dov Gil-Har	Israel
2005	bronze statuette: No. 17	No. 17	David Ofek	Israel
2005	bronze statuette: L'Chayim, Comrade Stalin!		Yale Strom	United States
2013	Hitler’s Children		Chanoch Ze’evi	Israel
2014	Ponevezh Time		Yehonatan Indursky	Israel
2015	Border Living		Ronit Ifergan	Israel
2015	My Arab Friend		Noga Nezer	Israel
2016	The Bentwich Syndrome		Gur Bentwich	Israel
2017	Winding		Avi Belkin	Israel
2018	The Impure		Daniel Najenson	Israel Argentina
2019	Granny Project		Bálint Révész	Hungary, United Kingdom

==== Warsaw Phoenix for the best short film ====
Year	Film	Original Title	Director	Country
2005	The Spoon of Life	Łyżeczka życia	Michał Nekanda-Trepka	Poland
2013	Catherine the Great		Anna Kuntsman	Israel
2015	Ischler		Atilla Hartung	Hungary
2016	Women in Sink		Iris Zaki	Israel
2017	Transfer		Michael Grudsky	Israel
2018	An Average Story		Yaniv Segalovich	Israel
2019	Vanity of Vanities		Alexey Shelmanov, Alexey Turkus	Russia

=== Audience award ===
Year	Film	Original Title	Director	Country
2005	No. 17	No. 17	David Ofek	Israel
2006	Portrait Photographer	Portrecista	Ireneusz Dobrowolski	Poland
2007	More Than 1000 Words		Solo Avital	Israel
2008	Souvenirs		Shahar Cohen, Halil Efrat	Israel
2009	Unsettled		Adam Hootnick	Israel
2010	8 stories, that has not changed the world	8 historii, które nie zmieniły świata	Ivo Krankowski	Poland
2011				
2012	Blinky & Me	Krakowiaczek ci ja…	Tomasz Magierski	Poland
2013	Hava Nagila		Roberta Grossman	Israel
2014	Dancing in Jaffa		Hilla Medalia	Israel
2015	In Silence	V tichu	Zdeněk Jiráský	Czech Republic
2016	Kapo in Jerusalem		Uri Barbash	Israel
2017	Bogdan's Journey	Przy Planty 7/9	Michał Jaskulski, Lawrence Loewinger	Poland
2018	1945		Ferenc Török	Hungary
2019	The Other Story	סיפור אחר	Avi Nesher	Israel

== See also ==
- Warsaw Jewish Film Festival
