= Tomer Heymann =

Israeli filmmaker (born 1970)

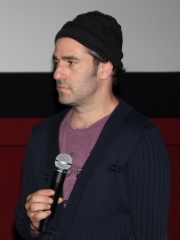
Tomer Heymann

Tomer Heymann (Hebrew: תומר היימן; born October 12, 1970, in Kfar Yedidia, Israel) is an Israeli filmmaker. He is best known for his work on the documentary films Paper Dolls, Mr.Gaga and Who's Gonna Love Me Now?.

== Career ==
Heymann has directed many documentary films and series in the past ten years, including long-term follow-ups and personal documentation. His films won major awards at prestigious film festivals, including his first film It Kinda Scares Me. Paper Dolls won three awards at the 2006 Berlin International Film Festival and the audience’s award at the Los Angeles Film Festival. The film and TV series Bridge over the Wadi, co-produced with the American ITVS, won the Israeli Documentary Film competition, participated in IDFA Festival's prestigious competition, and won many awards around the world. Tomer's new 8-part series The Way Home was recently broadcast by the Yes Doco Channel in Israel and won the best documentary series award at the 2009 Jerusalem International Film Festival. I Shot My Love premiered at the Berlin Int'l Film Festival in 2010, won the Best Mid-length Award at Hotdocs, and was screened in major film festivals, including Dok/Fest Sheffield, Taiwan Int'l Documentary Film Festival, Kassel Film Festival, and more. The 2016 documentary Who's Gonna Love Me Now?, directed by Tomer and his brother Barak Heymann, explores the life of Saar, a gay HIV-positive Israeli man living in London whom Tomer met in Tel Aviv in 1994.

== Filmography ==
- 2000 - Laugh Till I Cry - 45 min
- 2001 - It Kinda Scares Me - 57 min
- 2003 - Aviv-F*****-up Generation - Documentary 35mm, 60 min
- 2004 - Paper Dolls - 6-part series
- 2005 - Bridge Over the Wadi - 4-part series
- 2006 - Cinderellas - 4-part series
- 2006 - Paper Dolls - 35 mm, 80 min
- 2006 - Bridge Over The Wadi - 55 min
- 2007 - Debut - Hofaat Bechora - 5-part series
- 2007 - Out of Focus - 52 min
- 2007 - Black Over White - 50 min
- 2009 - The Way Home - 8-part series
- 2010 - I Shot My Love – 56/70 min
- 2015 - Mr. Gaga - 100 min
- 2016 - Who's Gonna Love Me Now?
- 2019 - Jonathan Agassi Saved My Life
- 2022 - I Am Not

=== Films Festivals and awards ===
- I Shot My Love - Warsaw Jewish Film Festival
- Paper Dolls - Jewish Motifs International Film Festival
- Jonathan Agassi Saved My Life - Warsaw Golden Phoenix at Jewish Motifs International Film Festival (2019)
