= Mirosław Chojecki =

Polish publisher and film producer (1949–2025)

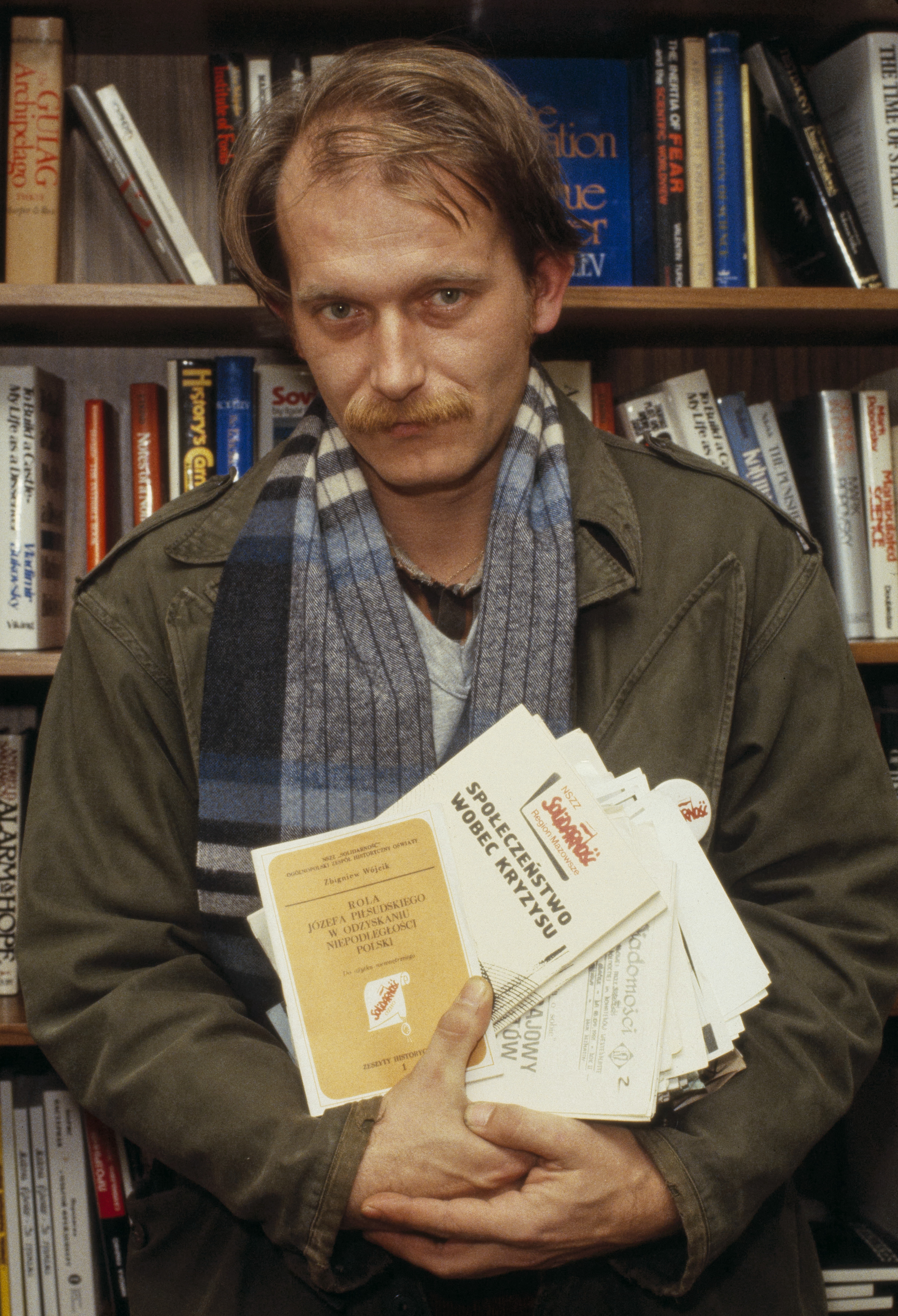
- Chojecki in 1981
- Born: 1 September 1949; Warsaw, Poland
- Died: 10 October 2025 (aged 76); Warsaw, Poland
- Occupations: Publisher; film producer

Mirosław Jerzy Chojecki (1 September 1949 – 10 October 2025) was a Polish publisher and film producer. He was an activist in the democratic anti-communist opposition during the period of the People's Republic of Poland.

== Life and career ==
Mirosław Chojecki was born on 1 September 1949, the son of Maria Stypułkowska-Chojecka, member of the Armia Krajowa and Kedyw who participated in the Polish resistance during World War II.

During the March 1968 events he participated in a student strike at the Warsaw Polytechnic, and was subsequently expelled from the university. Between 1967 and 1972 he belonged to the Polish Students' Association (ZSP). In 1974 he graduated from the Department of Chemistry of the University of Warsaw and then worked at the Institute for Nuclear Research (IBJ).

In June 1976 Chojecki was one of the participants in the campaign to help the repressed workers of Ursus and Radom. As a result he was dismissed from his position at the institute and went on trial along with Bogdan Grzesiak, and two printers from the Polish Trade Agency, Jerzy Ciechomski and Wiesfaw Kunikowski on 12 June 1976. In the same year he was among the organizers of the Workers' Defence Committee (KOR). He initiated independent publishing activity and was responsible for the reproduction of the KOR Communications and Information Bulletin of the KOR underground newspapers.

In September 1977 Chojecki created the Independent Publishing House "NOWa" which constituted the largest publishing house operating outside official communist censorship, becoming its leader. Initially, Chojecki wanted NOWa to publish historical books on topics officially forbidden or ignored by the communist authorities, but other oppositionists convinced him to also issue works of literature, including those by Czesław Miłosz and Günter Grass. When Chojecki was arrested by the communist secret police Grass signed a petition demanding his freedom. Along with Czesław Bielecki of CDN, Chojecki was one of the most important publishers collaborating with Kultura, the Polish emigre journal in Paris run by Jerzy Giedroyc.

In March 1980 he was detained, and then went on a hunger strike which ended up lasting 33 days. In May of that year, the parson of St. Christopher's Church in Podkowa Leśna led another hunger strike to protest Chojecki's and others political imprisonment. This protest was joined by more than twenty members of the democratic anti-communist opposition, including Jacek Kuroń, Bronisław Wildstein, Aleksander Hall, Jan Józef Lipski as well the Hungarian oppositionist and publisher Tibor Pákh. After a trial Chojecki was sentenced to one and a half years imprisonment with a conditional suspension.

In August 1980 he organized the printing of publications of the "second circuit" (as underground press was known in Poland at the time). He was re-arrested but was released after the signing of the Gdańsk Agreement between the communist government and striking workers of Gdańsk, which led to the creation of the Solidarity Trade Union. Chojecki was restored to his job at the Institute for Nuclear Research as well. In the same year he became a member of "Solidarity".

In October 1981 he went abroad and was in France when the government of General Wojciech Jaruzelski imposed martial law in Poland. He remained in exile in Paris and published a monthly "Kontakt", produced films on modern Polish history, and organized support for the underground in Poland, including the provision of media equipment and other hardware. He continued to collaborate with Jerzy Giedroyc during this period.

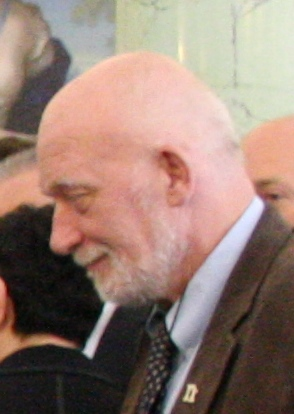
Chojecki in 2011

Chojecki returned to Poland in 1990. He co-founded the first commercial television station NTW ("Nowa Telewizja Warszawa", New Television Warsaw), started a film group "Kontakt" and served as adviser to the minister of culture.

In 2004, Mirosław Chojecki initiated and as director led the Warsaw-based Jewish Motifs International Film Festival.

He was the initiator and the honorary president of the Association for Free Speech (Stowarzyszenie Wolnego Słowa). He was also a member of the Civic Committee of the Solidarity with Ukraine (KOSzU).

In 2005 he was an honorary committee member for Donald Tusk during the presidential campaign. On 31 August 2006 Chojecki was awarded the Commander's Cross of the Order of Polonia Restituta by President Lech Kaczynski. In 2022, on the 46th anniversary of the creation of KOR, he received the Order of the White Eagle from the president Andrzej Duda.

Chojecki died in Warsaw on 10 October 2025, at the age of 76.
