= Who's Gonna Love Me Now? =

- Directed by: Barak Heymann; Tomer Heymann
- Written by: Barak Heymann; Tomer Heymann
- Starring: Saar Maoz
- Cinematography: Itai Raziel
- Edited by: Ron Omer, Ido Mochrik, Roi Turnoy
- Music by: Eran Weitz
- Production companies: Heymann Brothers Films, Breaking Productions
- Release date: 13 February 2016 (Berlin)
- Running time: 84 minutes
- Countries: United Kingdom; Israel
- Language: English

Who's Gonna Love Me Now? is a British-Israeli co-produced documentary film, released in 2016. Directed by Barak Heymann and Tomer Heymann, the film centres on Saar Maoz, a gay and HIV-positive Israeli expatriate living in London. Returning home for the first time since being thrown out by his family 20 years earlier for coming out as gay, the film contrasts his difficulties finding acceptance at home with the life he has built for himself as a member of the London Gay Men's Chorus. Tomer Heymann first met Maoz one night in Tel Aviv in 1994, but the pair lost contact until roughly ten years later when Heymann recognised Maoz in the street. Who's Gonna Love Me Now? was eventually pitched at the 2013 Sheffield Doc/Fest's MeetMarket.

The film was premiered in 2016 at the 66th Berlin International Film Festival, where it won the Panorama Audience Award for Best Documentary.

== See also ==
- List of lesbian, gay, bisexual or transgender-related films of 2016
