= Peter Mostovoy =

USSR-Russian-Israeli filmmaker

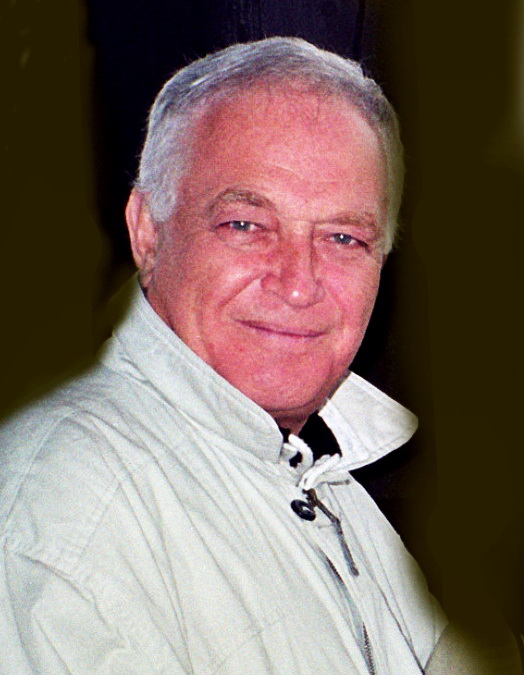
- Born: January 22, 1938 (age 87); Vladivostok, Soviet Union
- Occupation(s): film director, producer, screenwriter, cameraman.
- Father: Mikhail Mostovoy

Peter Mostovoy (born 22 January 1938) is a Russian-Israeli filmmaker.

== Life ==
Mostovoy was born to Tanya Olshanskaya and her husband, Mikhail Yakovlevich Mostovoy (1912–1987), a Red Army commander who served in the Far East. His parents met when his future father was only 24 years old and, having gone for a vacation to relatives in Odesa, Ukraine, met his wife-to-be. The couple moved to Vladivostok, where Mostovoy was born.

In 1955, after graduating from high school and music school, Mostovoy entered the Physics Department of the Saint Petersburg Electrotechnical University. In 1961, upon his graduation, he began working at the Scientific Research Institute of Broadcasting Reception and Acoustics in Leningrad.

A physicist by education, he began his career in film as an amateur. He made his first film Living Water (1965), which brought him many international prizes. It was then that he left his scientific career, and in 1965 the All-Union State Institute of Cinematography (VGIK). At the same time, he began to work at the Leningrad newsreel studio Lendoc. There, as a cameraman, he shot his first films, Look at the Face (1966) and Marina’s Life (1966). A year later he made his directorial debut with the film Only Three Lessons (1968).

Mostovoy was one of the creators of the so-called “Leningrad Wave” which he and his colleagues made popular with their films. Those colleagues included Pavel Kogan, Mikhail Litvyakov, Semyon Aranovich, Valery Guryanov. This was a unique phenomenon for Soviet film in those years.

In 1970, Mostovoy was invited by the Polish Minister of Cinematography to join the Warsaw Documentary Film Studio, where he directed the film “Master Belkovsky and Comrades.”

From 1970 to 1976 he worked as a director and screenwriter at film studios in Moscow and Leningrad.

Since 1971 he has been a member of the Union of Cinematographers (Moscow).

In 1977 he was accepted as a director at the Central Studio of Documentary Films (CSDF) in Moscow. In the late 1980s – early 1990s he headed the Risk Film Studio (Moscow) and a creative workshop at the Higher Directing School in Moscow and taught at the Norwegian National Film Center in Oslo.

He was a member of the jury of international Film Festivals in Nyon (Switzerland, 1992), Leipzig (2002), Kraków (2003), Saint Petersburg (2003), Warsaw (2007), Plovdiv (2007).

Since 1993, Mostovoy has been living and working as a freelance Director for several Israeli Television Channels.

== Awards and honors ==
Mostovoy's distinguished and prolific film career includes two full-length feature films and over forty documentaries, resulting in the achievement of many prestigious national and international awards, including:

- Golden Dove Award (Leipzig, 1968)
- Grand Prix Golden Dragon, Kraków (1969)
- Bronze Hobby-Horse Award, Kraków, (1970)
- Ecumenical Film Award, Oberhausen (1991)
- Russian National Prize “Laurels” (2005, 2014)
- Grand Prix “Golden Chest” (Plovdiv, 2006)
- Silver Phoenix Award, Warsaw (2006)
- “24 DOC” Special Award Moscow, (2006)
- Medal and Special Prize (Saint Petersburg, 2006)
- Man of the Year Award from Israel Plus TV, (Israel, 2006)
- Silver award (Stockholm, 2007)
- Yuri Shtern Award
