= Jonathan Agassi Saved My Life =

2018 Israeli documentary

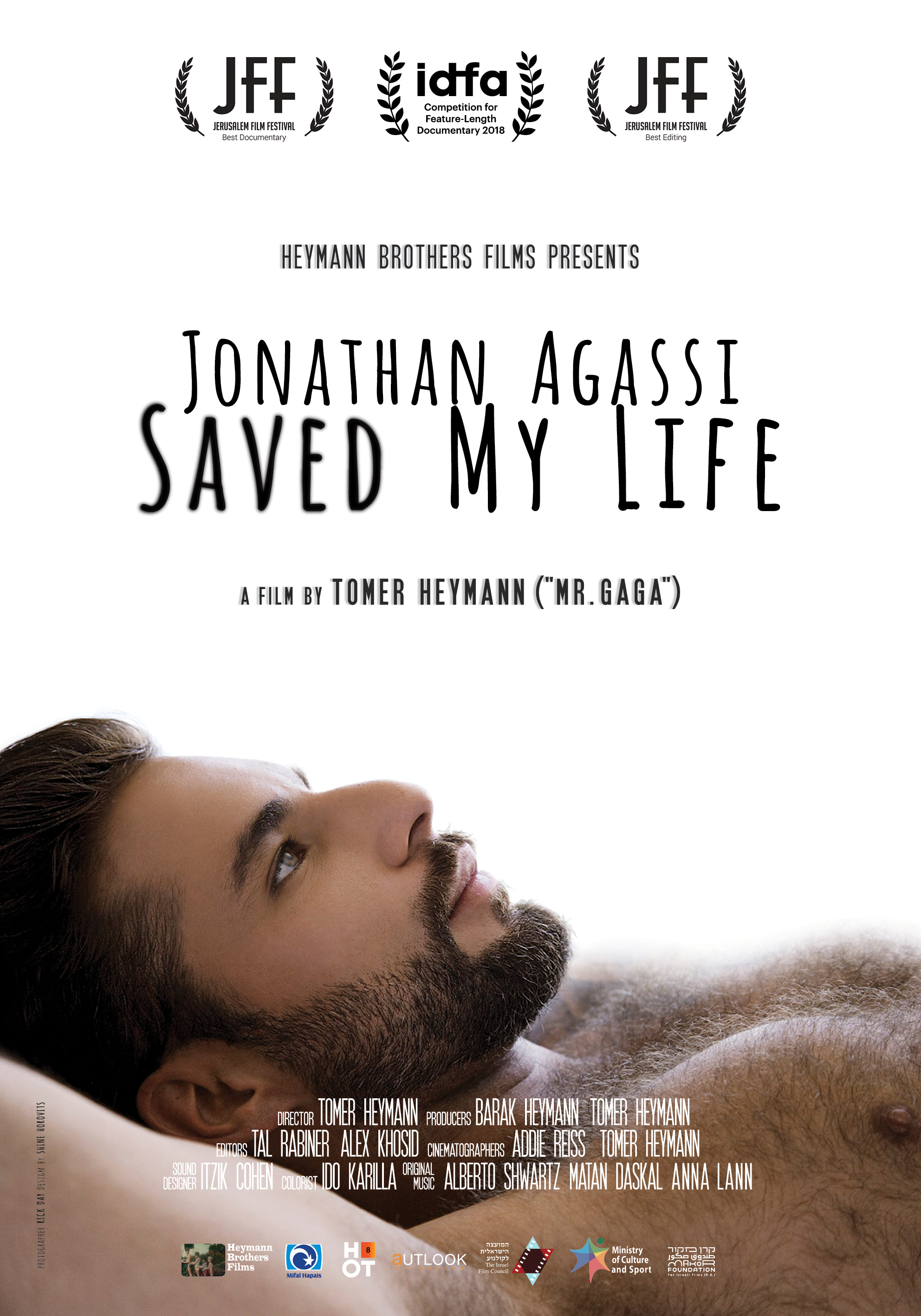
- Theatrical release poster
- Directed by: Tomer Heymann
- Produced by: Tomer Heymann; Barak Heymann
- Cinematography: Addie Reiss; Tomer Heymann; Jonathan Agassi; Gonen Glazer; Shuki Gozik; Itai Raziel; Mr. Pam
- Edited by: Editors: Tal Rabiner Alex Khosid; Editing Team: Alon Greenberg Elad Davidovitch Schicowich
- Music by: Matan Daskal; Alberto Shwartz; Anna Lann; Inbar Heymann (Theme Song)
- Production company: Heymann Brothers Films
- Release dates: 2018 (Israel); 13 May 2022 (Village East by Angelika)
- Running time: 100 minutes (theatrical release)
- Countries: Israel; Germany
- Languages: Hebrew; English

Jonathan Agassi Saved My Life (Hebrew: יונתן אגסי הציל את חיי) is a 2018 Israeli documentary film about the life of Israeli gay porn star Jonathan Agassi. The film is a Heymann Brothers Films release, written, directed and produced by Tomer Heymann.

== Plot summary ==
Jonathan Agassi is an international gay porn star. His rise to fame in the industry is built on what is considered a global taboo, yet is consumed by millions of people . Filmed over eight years, the documentary follows him from his native Tel Aviv to Berlin, documenting his ascent to the top of the gay porn industry, along with his struggles with drug addiction and depression. Alongside this deep look into the world of porn and escorting, the film also uncovers the relationship between a mother and son who redefine familiar family concepts.

== Production ==
The film was reedited in 2022 for the upcoming release in the US.

The film was supported By the Makor Foundation for Israeli Films and Channel 8 (Israel).

The Sound Design & Mix were done by Itzik Cohen.

== Release ==
A reedited version of the film will be released theatrically in the US starting at the Village East by Angelika in New York on May 13, and at Laemmle Theaters in Los Angeles on May 20. The Film was previously screened on BBC Four in March 2020.

== Festivals and awards ==
The film had its international premiere at the International Documentary Film Festival Amsterdam in November 2018. It won Best Documentary award & Best Editing Award at the Jerusalem Film Festival in July 2018, the Documentary Feature Special Jury Award at the Atlanta Film Festival in April 2019 and the Israeli Film Academy Award for Best Documentary in 2019. The film also won the Best Feature Documentary at the GAZE International LGBT film festival in August 2019 and the Jury Award for Best Documentary at the Reeling Chicago LGBTQ+ International Film Festival in October 2019.

== Reception ==
On Rotten Tomatoes, the film holds an approval rating of 100% based on 8 reviews. Kyle Turner of New York Times gave the film a positive review, saying "'Jonathan Agassi Saved My Life' achieves an impressive level of formal closeness with its subject while maintaining a critical distance from him, following his personal moments closely without over-sentimentalizing interactions." Jude Dry of IndieWire wrote: "Finally, a film that sees sex workers as humans — unadorned, unbiased, and unafraid."
