= Beata Chmiel =

- Occupation: Activist
- Known for: participant in the 1989 Polish Round Table Agreement, co-founder of Citizens of Culture, founding member of the Consultative Council

Beata Chmiel is a cultural activist who has been active since her participation in the 1989 Polish Round Table Agreement that negotiated the transition from the Polish People's Republic to the Third Polish Republic. Chmiel became a founding member of the Consultative Council created on 1 November 2020 in the context of the October 2020 Polish protests.

== Transition to the Third Polish Republic ==
In 1989, Chmiel was an assistant to Tadeusz Mazowiecki at the Polish Round Table Agreement that negotiated the transition from the Polish People's Republic to the Third Polish Republic. She considered herself a pupil of Jacek Kuroń, and argues that transparency and skill in making collective decision-making was a key political tactic used by opposition to the government of the time. She describes the consultative process of preparing national legislation that developed at that epoch as having been "completely thrown out" by the process used in 2017, when legislation was drafted in "political silence or government offices". Chmiel remembered Jarosław Kaczyński as having "always voted against human rights and against democratic opposition's view of a state ruled by law" during the Round Table Agreement negotiations.

== 2010s: Cultural activism ==
Chmiel was a co-founder of the Citizens of Culture (Polish: Obywatele Kultury, OK) movement in 2009. Citizens of Culture proposed a law to the lower house of Polish parliament, the Sejm, in 2009. The law was rejected.

A formal "Pact for Culture" was formalised by the Chancellery of the Prime Minister of Poland, based on discussions between national government administrations, local governments, citizens' groups and Citizens of Culture. The coordination aimed to include cultural institutes and artists' trade unions. Two formal committees created were the Team for the Pact (Polish: Zespół do spraw Paktu) and the Social Committee for the pact (Polish: Komitet Społeczny ds. Paktu), whose memberships were listed on the Citizens of Culture website. In signing the Pact, the government promised to present a citizens' media law to parliament. Citizens of Culture repeatedly reminded the government of the promise, which was not fulfilled.

The Citizens of Culture did not have a president or board, and had no funding. Decision-making aimed at consensus decisions, but decisions were signed by those who supported them. The group aimed at wide participation by citizens in cultural activities.

In 2015, Chmiel was a co-founder of the "I choose without Hate" (Polish: Wybieram bez Hejtu) coalition.

In 2016, when Citizens of Culture was one of the co-founders of the Citizens' Pact for Public Media (Polish: Obywatelski Pakt na Rzecz Mediów Publicznych), Chmiel stated that new laws on public media created by the government at the time "only changed the people in power in executive boards and is a return to the times of the Polish People's Republic, when the president of the Radio Committee was chosen by and directly controlled by the government." Chmiel described the Citizens' Pact as creating a citizens' coalition that aimed at convincing all political parties that public media should by run by citizens, not by political parties. Chmiel said that those who signed the Citizens' Pact had fought for six years "for independent and strong public media, strong in their mission, both financially and as an institution" and that public media should support artists, popularise culture, equalise access to education and culture and support reading.

Chmiel stated in May 2020 that the problems of Polish public media predated the 2016 appointment of Jacek Kurski as head of Telewizja Polska. She saw the problem starting with a shift in funding from subscriptions to advertising and market pressure, which evolved into politically based state funding, converting the public media into a propaganda tool for winning elections. She criticised politicians, advertisers and producers of low-quality content. Chmiel said that culture rather than entertainment should play a major role in public media.
