= Barak Heymann =

Israeli film director

Barak Heymann (Hebrew: ברק הימן) is an Israeli film director and producer.

== Biography ==
Heymann joined the "Heymann Brothers Films" company in 2003 and has since directed and produced several documentary films and series. Together with his brother Tomer he created the TV series Bridge Over the Wadi (2005), which won the Best Series Award at the Israeli Documentary Competition and was adapted to a one-hour film that was co-produced with the American ITVS company and won many awards around the world. Barak's film Dancing Alfonso was screened at the SXSW Festival and won the Silver Award in Shanghai TV Festival as well as the best directing award at Cronograph Film Festival in Moldova. The film Lady Kul el-Arab (by Palestinian director Ibtisam Mara'ana) won the special jury award in IDFA 2008 and one year later one more documentary he produced, Sayed Kashua - Forever Scared(By Dorit Zimbalist) was participating in the prestigious competition in IDFA. Together with Tomer Heymann, he directed the series Debut (2008) which won the Best Series Award at the Israeli Documentary Competition. Barak's latest productions are the 8-part TV series "The Way Home" (2009 - directed by Tomer Heymann) which won the first prize in the Int'l film festival in Jerusalem and the award-winning film I Shot My Love (2010 - directed by Tomer Heymann), which premiered in Berlinale and won many different prizes including the best mid-length documentary in HOTDOCS, the Audience award in Taiwan and more. His documentary The Lone Samaritan (2009) was screened in FIPA and Krakow Film Festivals, won the Best Documentary Award at the Toronto Jewish Film Festival, was nominated to the Israeli Academy Awards and was invited to the Human Rights Film Festival in Paris. Currently Barak is working on a new TV series dealing with couples after their divorce; he teaches cinematography in two Israeli schools and is involved in the production of several new projects. The 2016 documentary Who's Gonna Love Me Now?, directed by Barak and Tomer Heymann, explores the life of Saar, a gay HIV-positive Israeli man living in London whom Tomer met in Tel Aviv in 1994.

In 2026, he appeared on Israel television to defend the directors of the film NAZA.

== Filmography ==
- 2005 – Producer – Zorki
- 2005 – Director & Producer – My Village
- 2005 – Producer – Zorki
- 2005 – Director & Producer – My Village
- 2006 - Director & Producer - Bridge Over The Wadi
- 2007 – Director & co-producer - Dancing Alfonso
- 2007 - Director - Debut - Hofaat Bechora
- 2007 - Producer - Stalags- Holocaust and Pornography in Israel
- 2008 - Producer - Lady Kul el-Arab
- 2009 - Director & Producer - The Lone Samaritan
- 2009 – Producer – The Way Home
- 2009 - Producer, Sayed Kashua - Forever Scared
- 2010 - Producer - I Shot My Love
- 2016 - Who's Gonna Love Me Now?
