= Madonna: Truth or Dare =

1991 film by Alek Keshishian

- Theatrical release poster
- Directed by: Alek Keshishian
- Produced by: Tim Clawson; Jay Roewe
- Starring: Madonna
- Narrated by: Madonna
- Cinematography: Christophe Lanzenburg; Robert Leacock; Doug Nichol; Daniel Pearl; Toby Phillips; Marc Reshovsky
- Edited by: Barry Alexander Brown
- Music by: Madonna
- Production companies: Boy Toy, Inc. Propaganda Films
- Distributed by: Miramax Films (United States); Dino De Laurentiis Communications (International)
- Release date: May 10, 1991
- Running time: 122 minutes
- Country: United States
- Language: English
- Budget: $4.5 million
- Box office: $29 million

Madonna: Truth or Dare (also known as In Bed with Madonna internationally) is a 1991 American documentary film directed by Alek Keshishian chronicling the life of entertainer Madonna during her 1990 Blond Ambition World Tour. Madonna approached Keshishian to do an HBO special on the tour after watching his Harvard senior project. Initially planned to be a traditional concert film, Keshishian was so impressed with the backstage life that he persuaded Madonna to make it the focus of the film. Madonna funded the project and served as executive producer. The film was edited to be in black-and-white, in order to emulate cinéma vérité, while the performance scenes are in color.

Madonna: Truth or Dare was screened out of competition at the 1991 Cannes Film Festival and was given a limited release on May 10, 1991; two weeks later, it had its worldwide release. It opened to positive reviews although certain scenes, such as one where Madonna visits her mother's grave, were criticized. Madonna was nominated for a Golden Raspberry Award for Worst Actress. With a worldwide gross of $29 million, it was the highest-grossing documentary of all time, until Bowling for Columbine surpassed it in 2002. Truth or Dare has been noted as a groundbreaking film for its casual portrayal of homosexuality, and was compared to Paris Is Burning (1990). It has also had an impact on reality television and celebrity culture, inspiring parodies and other music-related documentaries.

== Synopsis ==
The film begins on August 6, 1990, the day after the final show of the Blond Ambition World Tour in Nice, France. Madonna reminisces in her hotel room about the tour and how its completion would affect her.

In a flashback to April 1990, the tour is about to kick off in Japan. Madonna did not realize that it was rainy season. Because of this, she and the dancers switch their tour costumes for warmer attire. In a voice-over, Madonna confesses that the only thing keeping her from "slashing my wrists" is the thought of returning to North America and performing the show as it is meant to be. In the United States, she meets the families of her dancers. Oliver Crumes, one of the dancers, sees his father for the first time in several years. In Los Angeles, sound problems arise; despite reassurances, Madonna focuses on the technical problems and yells at her manager Freddy DeMann for allowing so many people from the music industry in the front rows. After the show, she meets with several celebrities; Kevin Costner offends her by calling the show "neat" and she pretends to gag after he leaves.

On the final Toronto show, the crew receives a visit from the local police who threaten to arrest Madonna for "lewd and indecent display", specifically the masturbation scene during the performance of "Like a Virgin"; she refuses to change the show. DeMann believes the threat of arrest will only make Madonna go further. According to a news report, Toronto police decide not to arrest her, claiming that no threats were made. The next stop is Madonna's hometown of Detroit. In a voice-over, she expresses the difficulty she has going back home. At the end of "Holiday", Madonna calls her father Tony Ciccone on stage and sings "Happy Birthday to You". Backstage, Tony and his wife Joan compliment the show, though Tony expresses his displeasure at some of the more "burlesque" aspects. Madonna and her brother Christopher wait for their older brother Martin to show up while they discuss his substance abuse problems. Later, she reunites with her "childhood idol" Moira McPharlin-Messana, who gives her a painting she made entitled "Madonna and Child", and asks her to be godmother to her unborn child. Before leaving Detroit, Madonna visits her mother's grave for the first time since she was a child, as "Promise to Try" plays in the background. She lies down beside the grave as Christopher watches from afar.

As the tour continues, Madonna's throat problems worsen while her boyfriend Warren Beatty becomes more fed up with the cameras. During a throat examination in Madonna's hotel room, Beatty chastises her for the documentary, telling her the atmosphere is driving everyone insane. Madonna ignores him, and when she declines to have the rest of her examination done off camera, he starts laughing, saying, "She doesn't want to live off-camera, much less talk... What point is there of existing off-camera?". Due to her throat problems, she cancels some of her shows. In New York City, her doctor instructs her not to talk and she finds herself isolated in her apartment with only her assistant Melissa Crowe. Madonna is upset at losing contact with the dancers.

The third and final leg of the tour kicks off in Europe with everyone in better spirits. As the tour nears Italy, Pope John Paul II attempts to have it banned, forcing Madonna to cancel one of two shows in Rome. Sandra Bernhard appears to cheer up Madonna. Madonna tells Sandra that she's interested in meeting Antonio Banderas. When Pedro Almodóvar throws a party in Madrid, Madonna spends a week thinking up ways to seduce Banderas, but it turns out that he is married. While Madonna works in her hotel room, voice-overs from her family, friends and co-workers describe the star. Though she is happier now than she was on her last tour, Sandra does not think that she takes enough time to enjoy her successes. Others describe her in unflattering terms.

As the tour winds down, the group plays a game of truth or dare? and Madonna is dared to perform fellatio on a glass bottle. She's then asked who has been the "love of your life for your whole life?", to which she replies without hesitation, "Sean. Sean". She then invites her dancers and backup singers, one by one, to join her in bed, where she imparts "words of wisdom" to each. While the show's closing act, "Keep It Together", plays, a montage of Madonna saying good-bye to her dancers is shown. The film ends with a clip of Madonna telling director Alek Keshishian to go away and, "Cut it, Alek! Cut it, Goddamnit!"

== Tour ==
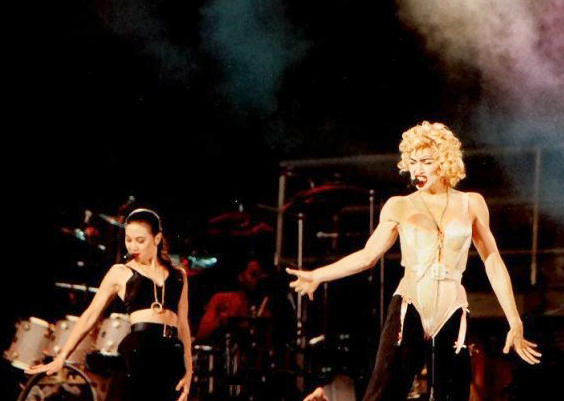
Madonna performing "Express Yourself" as the opening number of the Blond Ambition World Tour

The Blond Ambition World Tour was Madonna's third concert tour. It supported her fourth studio album Like a Prayer and the Dick Tracy soundtrack I'm Breathless. In January 1989, Pepsi-Cola announced that they had signed a US$5 million deal with Madonna to feature her and her single "Like a Prayer" on a television commercial. The deal also included Pepsi sponsoring Madonna's next world tour, announced then as the Like a Prayer World Tour. After the release of the music video for "Like a Prayer", which featured a church and Catholic symbols such as stigmata, Ku Klux Klan-style cross burning and Madonna kissing a black saint (Leon Robinson), religious groups worldwide including the Vatican immediately protested due to its blasphemous use of Christian imagery and called for a national boycott of Pepsi and PepsiCo's subsidiaries. The company revoked the commercial and canceled Madonna's sponsorship contract. Sire Records officially announced the Blond Ambition World Tour on November 16, 1989.

The concert, which was directed and choreographed by Vincent Paterson, was divided into five segments: Metropolis, inspired by the 1927 German expressionist film of same name; Religious by religious themes; Dick Tracy by the film of the same name and cabaret; Art Deco was inspired by early Hollywood films using the works of artist Tamara de Lempicka, and the fifth was an encore. The art direction was developed by Madonna's brother Christopher Ciccone, while the costumes were created by designer Jean-Paul Gaultier. It received positive reviews from contemporary critics, who praised its fashion and theatricals and received the Most Creative Stage Production Award at the Pollstar Concert Industry Awards. It was also a commercial success, grossing over US$62.7 million from 57 concerts.

== Background and production ==
The documentary was directed by Alek Keshishian from Propaganda Films, who had previously worked on music videos by Elton John and Bobby Brown. David Fincher, who had previously directed Madonna's music videos for "Express Yourself", "Oh Father" and "Vogue", was originally attached to direct, but pulled out shortly before the tour started. Madonna became interested in working with Keshishian after seeing his Harvard senior project - a short film titled Wuthering Heights. According to author J. Randy Taraborrelli, "her gut instincts told her that the handsome, long-haired film maker with fresh ideas was the kind of hip, cool artist who could lend the film the right edge". She approached Keshishian about doing an HBO special on the tour and flew him to Japan, where the it kicked off in April 1990. Initially to be a traditional concert film, Keshishian rented "everything that had been done in the music documentary and concert arena", but decided to not watch any of them, as he came to the conclusion that he wanted to do something different. He found the backstage scene to be "a Fellini-esque dysfunctional family" and persuaded Madonna to do an actual film focusing on that, with some performances interspersed; "when I realized it could be more, everyone was telling her, 'Don't be crazy. Look at what happened with Rattle and Hum and how it didn't make money'. She decided to go with my opinion, rather than the others", the director recalled. Madonna herself funded the project and served as its executive producer. During an interview with James Kaplan from Entertainment Weekly, she explained:

It's something that I felt compelled to do. I was very moved by the group of people I was with. I felt like their brother, their sister, their mother, their daughter — and then I also thought that they could do anything. And that we could do anything on stage. Because the show was so demanding, so complex — whenever you go through something really intense with a group of people it brings you closer together. And ultimately, though I'd set out to document the show, just to get it on film, when I started looking at the footage I said, 'This is so interesting to me. There's a movie here. There's something here'.

Madonna later told Good Morning America that her main intention was "to explode the myth that we raise up on a pedestal people we turn into icons. We make them inhuman and we don't give them human attributes so they're not allowed to fail, they're not allowed to make mistakes". Taraborrelli pointed out that Madonna gave Keshishian "full access to her world, complete entrée to her life during the tour's four months". To record Madonna and those around her with ease, the director would place the cameras behind one-way mirrors; he would have his crew wear black at all times, and gave them specific orders not to interact with the subjects. Each night after filming, he would log the day's events on a computer to keep track of the footage. The interviews with the tour's dancers and staff were done the first two weeks in Japan, while the performances were shot during the three Paris shows in July; this allowed Keshishian to "plan the numbers, to sit where I wanted them to be".

The backstage footage was edited to be in black and white to give it a "vérité look", while the performances were edited to be in full color. Keshishian explained that "it seemed like an interesting division: the color for the artifice of the performance versus the reality of documentary, and yet each reflected the other". He also recalled that New Line Cinema, the film's original distributor, dropped it because of this. Over 200 hours of footage were shot, which took the director over a month and a half to edit and trim down to a reasonable length. The first cut was over 3 hours long, but Miramax executive Harvey Weinstein said that it was still too long and forced Keshishian to reduce it. Locations shot included the Calvary Cemetery and Mausoleum at Kawkawlin, Michigan. The film features appearances by Al Pacino, Mandy Patinkin, Olivia Newton-John, Antonio Banderas, Sandra Bernhard, Kevin Costner and Warren Beatty, whom Madonna was dating at the time. Madonna recalled that Beatty "didn't take the whole thing seriously while it was being made — he just thought I was making a home movie".

== Release and promotion ==
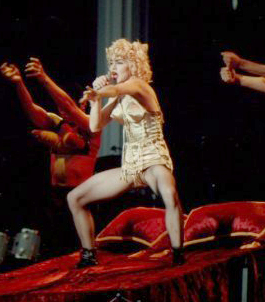
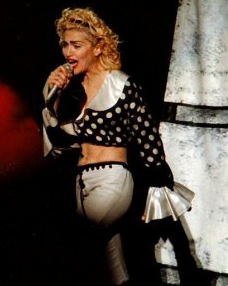
Madonna performing "Like a Virgin" (left) and "Holiday" (right) on the Blond Ambition World Tour. The performances were released as music videos to promote Truth or Dare.

In August 1990, after the film was finished, Madonna invited a group of friends, including Beatty, to watch a rough cut in the screening room of Beatty's home. According to Taraborrelli, Beatty did not approve of the film; the next day, Madonna received a letter from his attorney demanding that certain scenes featuring Beatty be cut from the final version of the film, otherwise she would be sued; they came to an agreement in private and the scenes in question were removed from the movie. In tribute to the games of truth or dare? Madonna and her entourage played during their breaks between shows, the working title was Truth or Dare: On the Road, Behind the Scenes and In Bed with Madonna, but Madonna felt it was too long and shortened it to Truth or Dare. Outside North America, the title was changed by Miramax Films to In Bed with Madonna, due to the game being relatively unknown in other countries. In a 2005 interview with Dermot O'Leary, Madonna said she disliked that title, calling it "really naff".

The film was distributed by Miramax Films. It was rated R by the MPAA due to profanity, brief nudity and sexual suggestiveness. It was given a limited release on May 10, 1991. Five days later, Madonna attended the 44th Cannes Film Festival, where it was selected to be screened out of competition. She wore a white silk bra with tap shorts and a pink overcoat designed by Gaultier. For Vincent Canby, from The New York Times, both the film and Madonna were "canny and entertaining" and "brought this year's festival spontaneously to life for the first time". Truth or Dare had its worldwide release on May 24, 1991. To promote the film, Madonna made a guest appearance in the recurring sketch of Saturday Night Live, "Wayne's World". Additionally, the performances of "Holiday" and "Like a Virgin" included on the documentary were released as music videos and received nominations at the 1991 and 1992 MTV Video Music Awards. In several malls across the United States, the film was heavily promoted with tie-in products, big visuals and video displays.

== Reception ==
=== Box office ===
Upon release, the film was an immediate commercial success. In the United States, it entered the box office at number 13, when it had a limited release the weekend of May 10–12, 1991, earning a total of US$543,250 from being shown at 51 theaters. On its first weekend of nationwide release, it grossed US$2.8 million, bringing its total box-office receipts to $3.3 million and making it the third-highest-grossing film, only behind F/X2 and What About Bob? According to Jack Matthews from the Los Angeles Times, Truth or Dare grossed over $4.3 million during its first week of release, surpassing Woodstock (1970) as the most commercially successfully music documentary up until that time. The film remained in theaters for 33 weeks and collected a total revenue of $15,012,935 million in the United States. With an additional gross of $14 million internationally, Madonna: Truth or Dare earned a total of $29 million from its theatrical release, against a budget of $4.5 million.

=== Home video ===
The film was first released on home video by LIVE Entertainment in North America on October 9, 1991. In the United Kingdom the uncut film was released with an "18" rating but an additional "15" certificate, edited version was released simultaneously on October 30, 1991; over 57 seconds of footage were cut to make it appropriate for younger audiences. It was certified Platinum by the British Phonographic Industry (BPI) and Gold in Germany by Bundesverband Musikindustrie (BVMI) denoting shipments of 25,000 copies for both countries. By January 1992, the video had sold 155,000 units in the United States according to The Hollywood Reporter.

In 1992, it was re-released on VHS in the United States with two additional performances from the Blond Ambition Tour – "Like a Prayer" and "Hanky Panky" – which played after the end credits. The DVD version was released on August 26, 1997, by LIVE Entertainment in North America but did not get a worldwide release until January 6, 2003, by MGM Entertainment. On April 3, 2012, it was released on Blu-ray for the first time. This release was remastered for 1080p, presented in a 1.78:1 aspect ratio with 5.1 DTS-HD Master Audio; it included the film's theatrical trailer as its sole bonus feature.

== Critical response ==
Madonna: Truth or Dare received generally positive reviews. The documentary was one of the most highly-praised films of 1991. On the review aggregator website Rotten Tomatoes, 86% of 35 critics' reviews are positive, with an average rating of 6.6/10. Metacritic, which uses a weighted average, assigned the film a score of 70 out of 100, based on 24 critics, indicating "generally favorable" reviews. Peter Travers from Rolling Stone deemed it "the most revealing and outrageously funny piece of pop demythologizing since Dont Look Back"; praising its "freshness and snap" but criticizing Madonna's "lost-lamb routine" in the scene when she visits her mother's grave. He concluded his review: "you may not leave Truth or Dare loving Madonna, but you'll respect her as a force of nature". Roger Ebert gave it three and a half stars. He wrote that "unlike most rock documentaries, the real heart of this film is backstage, and the onstage musical segments, while effectively produced, seem obligatory - they're not the reason she wanted to make this film". Ebert was particularly impressed by Madonna's work ethic. Writing for The New York Times, Janet Maslin noted that "Madonna has succeeded in taking on real importance. [Truth or Dare] combines galvanizing, well-photographed color scenes of her onstage act with grainy black-and-white glimpses of her offstage one, sometimes making interesting efforts to reconcile the two". Also from The New York Times, Joe Coscarelli felt that some of the film's best moments were Madonna's interactions with other celebrities. Gawker's Rich Juzwiak opined it was "sometimes infuriating, but it's rarely less than fantastically entertaining. A relic of a time before grueling media training, when pop stars didn't hang on the approval of their publicists before talking". Bustle's Amy Roberts called it "raw and honest, it never felt cynical (and still doesn't)".

"Part of the alchemy of a great music documentary is catching the subject at exactly the right moment, and Alek Keshishian couldn't have trained his cameras on Madonna at a better time. In the midst of the inventive and influential Blonde Ambition [sic] tour, he finds a self-possessed genius who is a magnet for controversy, as well as for other stars".

— Ryan Gilbey from The Guardian on his list of the 20 best music documentaries, where Madonna: Truth or Dare came in first.

For The Washington Post's Martha Sherrill, "It's fresh. It's outrageous. It's unreality in black-and-white. And it's certainly more entertaining than Madonna in person". Louis Virtel from Paper praised the live footage as "some of Madonna's most exhilarating live work" and "the way the movie incorporates the stories of Madonna's dancers, most of them gay, is one of its richest features". Slant Magazine's Keith Watson called it "less of a concert film than an elaborately constructed exegesis on pop mythmaking and the construction of identity", awarding it three stars. Noel Murray from The A.V. Club praised some of the film's "raunchy" parts; "compared to the increasingly brittle, cautiously patrician Madonna of recent years, it's a kick to see her so playful". Murray also highlighted the scenes in which Madonna talks to her father on the phone and meets an old childhood friend as "the times when we do seem to be seeing the real 'real' Madonna". Spectrum Culture's Erica Peplin felt that it "humanizes Madonna like nothing else has".

Owen Gleiberman from Entertainment Weekly gave it an A− and wrote: "the most daring — and revelatory — aspect of the movie is how candidly it depicts Madonna's symbiotic relationship with her dancers, almost all of whom are gay. [...] She does more than show us the backstage life of a pop star. With inspiring frankness, she reveals the roots of her style". In 2002, the same publication concluded that "[Madonna] gets the role she was born to play". Writing for The Backlot, Virtel called it "damn rewatchable, [with] legendary concert sequences and nutty celebrity cameos, and simply recalls Madonna at her prime". Similarly, The Guardian's Guy Lodge deemed it an "exhilarating snapshot of the star in her godly, don't-give-a-fuck prime, well before Kabbalah and Guy Ritchie [...] the film's concert sequences may be its least interesting material almost by design, yet they capture the brazen, cocksure performance presence that – well ahead of her vocal chops, as she herself admits – made her a phenomenon to begin with".

David Denby from New York magazine, pointed out that the film "is often lewd, but she's never sexual. [Madonna] offers a public personality that is completely eroticized". Nonetheless, he criticized her for having "virtually, nothing of interest to say [...] because the notion of a private self has long ceased to exist for her [...] She's so much a one-note person that Truth or Dare, for all its skill, is often a little boring". On a more mixed review, Ty Burr from Entertainment Weekly wrote that "even if Truth or Dare is artfully made and entertaining, it's no less an act for being a good one [...] like everything Madonna has her hand in, the film proclaims style as content". He continued his review: "[Madonna] is so controlling of her public self that when the cameras are whirring she doesn't know how to do 'realistic'", and criticized the cemetery scene for being "awkward and forced".

Writing for Pitchfork, Emma Madden pointed out that "for what should have been a tour documentary, little attention is paid to the world outside of Madonna's dressing and hotel rooms [...] While most music documentaries today don't seem to exist for any other purpose than to say, 'wait, this pop star's a good person, cut them some slack', [Truth or Dare] makes her look like a straight-up megalomaniac". They concluded their review by referring to the film as "one of the most morally contentious documents of the spoiled, rich white-girl fantasy". PopMatters' Bill Gibron deemed it "hollow and calculated" and Bill Wyman, from the Chicago Reader, panned it as "the most baldly manipulative and scarily dishonest piece of propaganda to be recorded on celluloid since at least the Reagan campaign's 'Morning in America' commercials and possibly since Triumph of the Will", and called it "Madonna's big lie". At the 12th Golden Raspberry Awards, Madonna was nominated for Worst Actress, but lost to Sean Young for A Kiss Before Dying. At the 1992 Homer Awards, organized by the Video Software Dealers Association, Truth or Dare won in the category of Best Documentary.

== Lawsuit ==
On January 21, 1992, dancers Oliver Crumes, Kevin Stea and Gabriel Trupin sued Madonna and her production company Boy Toy Inc., Miramax and Propaganda Films for "invasion of privacy, fraud and deceit, misrepresentation, and intentional infliction of emotional distress". The suit claimed the three men had been shown in "nonperformance" scenes discussing intimate facts about their personal lives, making them the subject of "contempt and ridicule". One of the scenes in question showed Trupin kissing Salim Gauwloos; the former claimed Keshishian had told him he would delete any footage he believed invaded his privacy, but when he asked that that particular scene be cut, Madonna yelled at him and told him to "get over it". A spokesperson for Warner Bros., Madonna's label, stated that "the parties [in the suit] have been handsomely compensated. They did sign releases, and they were all paid". In a commercial for MTV's Rock the Vote campaign later that year, Madonna joked about the lawsuit, saying: "You're probably thinking that's not a very good reason to vote... So sue me! Everybody else does". The trio eventually reached an out-of-court settlement in 1994 and the lawsuit was dismissed. Debra Johnson, Trupin's lawyer, said that "we could have settled this thing without 2 1/2 years of litigation and the related expense if Madonna had just recognized that dancers have rights, too". In 2015, Keshishian talked about the lawsuit and defended Madonna:

All [the dancers] were asked to sign releases. It came with the gig, you know? They all signed them. What happened was when the time was coming for it to be released, some didn't want it to be revealed they were gay, some wanted money. Legally, it was extortion, in my mind. They'd signed the releases and it wasn't as if we were filming it in secret. The cameras were there all the time. They did the interviews. What did they think was being filmed — a home movie!? I didn't respect that. I felt bad for Madonna because she really did love those kids and they turned around and did that. That's why celebrities grow more and more weary of getting close to anybody.

While recalling their involvement on the lawsuit on the film's 30th anniversary, Stea and Crumes said they felt no animosity toward Madonna and merely wanted to get the money that was "written out and agreed to in our contracts"; the former said that his involvement was "completely a contractual issue", and that "[my] agents should have been the ones to sue, not me". Crumes on the other hand, said that, despite being "so much of a vulnerable movie [...] We should have all gotten paid because it's still making money". Nonetheless, he dismissed the whole situation as "water under the bridge [...] No matter what, I'm always going to still love her. I have nothing but love for her, and I wish one day I'll get to see her again". In 2023, on her Celebration Tour, Madonna paid tribute to Trupin, displaying his image during a performance of "Live to Tell" dedicated to those who died of AIDS.

== Legacy ==
"I had no idea I was going to inspire so many gay men to A. give blowjobs to Evian bottles, and B. be free and take a stand and say 'this is who I am, like it or not'. When I look back and watch that film, I am horrified by my brattiness, but I'm also proud that it gave so many people hope".

— Madonna talking about the film at the 30th GLAAD Media Awards.

Writing for Billboard, Louis Virtel said Truth or Dare was "one of the first documentaries that featured gay dudes just hanging out", and called it one of the reasons Madonna is an "eternal inspiration to the LGBTQ community". Similarly, Samuel R. Murrian from Parade said that it inspired many gay men to come out. On their book Film Theory Goes to the Movies: Cultural Analysis of Contemporary Film, authors Jim Collins, Ava Preacher Collins and Hilary Radner compared Truth or Dare to the documentary Paris Is Burning (1990), as both films provide access to the "comments and performances" of black and Latino gay men. Melissa Anderson, from The Village Voice, said that, just like Paris Is Burning, "[Truth or Dare] is an essential investigation of queerness, race, and stardom". Keith Watson from Slant Magazine pointed out that the film was the first time many Madonna fans, and the public in general, saw two men kissing. Similar thoughts were shared by the HuffPost's Daryl Deino, who stated that Truth or Dare was the first mainstream gay film that many people saw, and that it led to the acceptance of future films and television shows with gay themes.

The Metrograph deemed it crucial for the LGBTQ community, as it exhibited "a degree of honesty and non-judgment towards homosexuality rarely seen in mass-market entertainment at the time". For Jeremy Kinser from Queerty, it "changed a generation of gay people". Keshishian said he was very happy that so many gay adults and young people from all over the United States credit Truth or Dare with helping them see gay men in a positive and casual way. The documentary Strike a Pose premiered in the Panorama section of the 2016 Berlinale. Directed by Ester Gould and Reijer Zwaan, the film chronicles the lives of six of the Blond Ambition Tour's seven dancers who appeared on Truth or Dare, including Kevin Stea, Carlton Wilborn, Luis Xtravaganza Camacho, Jose Gutierez Xtravaganza, Salim Gauwloos and Oliver Crumes. Gauwloos opined that Truth or Dare showed "being gay when it was not cool". Sue Trupin, the mother of dancer Gabriel Trupin who died of AIDS in 1995, said that she had no idea "just how important [Truth or Dare] had been to gay men's self-acceptance and validation", and that her son, who led the lawsuit against Madonna, "would have come to be extremely proud of the role that film played in helping gay men around the world". Trenton Straube from POZ magazine concluded: "This was 1991. Before the Internet, before gay marriage, before Will & Grace [...] Truth or Dare was some revelatory, groundbreaking shit. It changed lives".

Joe Coscarelli from The New York Times felt that "[Truth or Dare] has transcended cult-classic status and been elevated to the modern canon by pop obsessives and queer audiences of a certain generation. It also in many ways presaged the celeb-reality complex". Nina Metz from the Chicago Tribune, noted an impact on reality television, as it was released just a year before MTV's The Real World premiered. Lee Barron wrote on his book Celebrity Cultures: An Introduction, that the film was a precursor to the confessional technique many reality shows would go on to adopt. A similar opinion was shared by The Daily Telegraph's Matt Cain, who also added that it predated "the modern wave of manipulated and 'structured' reality TV". According to Benjamin Halligan, Robert Edgar and Kirsty Fairclough-Isaacs, authors of The Music Documentary: Acid Rock to Electropop, "echoes of this particular documentary can be seen throughout contemporary celebrity culture, particularly in reality TV. It answered, or reflected or engendered, an intense public fascination with all facets of celebrity life". These thoughts were shared by Jason Baily from Flavorwire, who concluded that it's impossible to imagine something like Keeping Up with the Kardashians without the "precedent" of Truth or Dare. Nina Metz also said Madonna was foreshadowing what was going to happen with social media. For Amy Roberts, Truth or Dare was "ahead of its time in many respects", as it raised "vital questions about culture and society that were crucial for the time it was made", concluding that "its legacy remains to make an impact, and its influence helped change the pop music industry for the better".

Noel Murray said that it can be seen as a study in marketing. Keshishian concluded that "it takes a very special type of person at a very special time in their lives to want to do that kind of movie [...] There aren't many who pull off what Madonna pulls off in Truth or Dare". Further influence can be seen in other music-related documentaries, such as White Diamond: A Personal Portrait of Kylie Minogue (2007), Justin Bieber: Never Say Never (2011), One Direction: This Is Us (2013) and Homecoming: A Film by Beyoncé (2019). Singer Katy Perry cited Truth or Dare as a major inspiration for her 2012 film Katy Perry: Part of Me. Both Gaga: Five Foot Two (2017) and Miss Americana (2020) were compared to Truth or Dare; Lorraine Ali from the Los Angeles Times wrote that while Truth or Dare was "an orchestrated look into [Madonna]'s life", Five Foot Two is "too amateurish to do any of that, let alone cut its own path". Rolling Stone's David Fear said that, thirty years later, it remains as "the template for the modern pop-star documentary". In 2016, Selena Gomez hired Keshishian to direct the music video for her song "Hands to Myself" because of his work on Truth or Dare. Director Brady Corbet cited Madonna's performance in the documentary as one of the inspirations for the main character, Celeste Montgomery, of his 2018 film Vox Lux, played by Natalie Portman. In 2018, The Guardian named Truth or Dare the greatest music documentary of all time. Amy Roberts said it was "doubtful that we'll ever see a music documentary make the same visceral impact".

== In popular culture ==
Aired in November 1991, the ninth episode of the second season of American sitcom Blossom, "Rockumentary", revolved around Truth or Dare: the titular character Blossom Russo (Mayim Bialik) falls asleep while watching the movie and dreams she's a famous singer starring in her own documentary. Neil Patrick Harris guest starred as Derek Slade, a character based on Warren Beatty who convinces Blossom to fire her father-manager Nick (Ted Wass).

One month later, comedian Julie Brown directed and starred in the mockumentary Medusa: Dare to Be Truthful. In the film, Brown plays Medusa, a "manic-depressive pop sensation with an unrelenting ego and an insatiable sex drive" who allows a documentary crew to follow her on her "Blonde Leading the Blonde Tour". Kathy Griffin and Donal Logue played supporting roles. It included parodies of several Madonna songs, such as "Party in my Pants" ("Like a Prayer"), "Expose Yourself" ("Express Yourself") and "Vague" ("Vogue"). It received positive reviews from critics; Joe Rhodes from Los Angeles Times wrote that "because Madonna's act so often seems like a parody itself, there are moments when it's hard to distinguish 'Medusa' from the real thing". In an interview with Michael Musto of The Village Voice, Brown recalled Madonna's reaction when she first saw the film: "At first I heard she really liked it. Then I heard she didn't like the scene where I rolled around on my dog's grave. She'd rolled around on her mother's — like that wasn't offensive enough? Then she didn't like the scene with the dancers suing me, because that really happened to her". Madonna then sent Brown a half-finished bottle of warm champagne as a gift, which Brown allegedly drank.

In March 1993, British sketch comedy television series French & Saunders did a parody of the film titled In Bed with French & Saunders, with both Dawn French and Jennifer Saunders playing Madonna. Another parody was done by RuPaul during the 1997 Christmas special of his VH1 talk show The RuPaul Show, with guest appearances by Hall & Oates, Suzanne Somers and En Vogue.
