= Blond Ambition World Tour =

1990 concert tour by Madonna

- Tour by Madonna
- Promotional poster for the tour
- Location: Asia; Europe; North America
- Associated albums: Like a Prayer; I'm Breathless
- Start date: April 13, 1990
- End date: August 5, 1990
- Legs: 3
- No. of shows: 57
- Supporting act: Technotronic
- Box office: US$62.7 million (Note: US$154.51 million in 2025 dollars.)

Madonna concert chronology
- Who's That Girl World Tour (1987); Blond Ambition World Tour (1990); The Girlie Show (1993)

The Blond Ambition World Tour (billed as Blond Ambition World Tour 90) was the third concert tour by American singer Madonna, launched in support of her fourth studio album, Like a Prayer (1989), and the Dick Tracy soundtrack album I'm Breathless (1990). Comprising 57 shows, the tour visited Asia, Europe, and North America and ran from April 13, 1990, at Chiba Marine Stadium in Chiba, Japan, to August 5 at Stade Charles-Ehrmann in Nice, France. It marked Madonna's first concerts in Sweden and Spain. Originally planned as the Like a Prayer World Tour and intended to be sponsored by Pepsi, the tour proceeded under a new title after the sponsorship was withdrawn amid controversy surrounding the music video of "Like a Prayer".

The production was structured around five thematic acts—Metropolis, Religious, Dick Tracy, Art Deco, and an encore—each blending music, choreography, and visual storytelling. Art direction was overseen by Christopher Ciccone, with costumes designed by Jean-Paul Gaultier. Drawing inspiration from German expressionist cinema, Catholic imagery, cabaret, and early Hollywood aesthetics, the show was praised for its production, theatricality, and Madonna's onstage presence.

Despite its success, the tour generated significant controversy due to its sexual content and use of religious symbolism. Pope John Paul II publicly urged audiences to boycott the show, and protests led to the cancellation of one Italian date. In Toronto, authorities threatened Madonna with arrest over the performance of "Like a Virgin" (1984), which featured her simulating masturbation, though the concert continued unchanged. Commercially, the tour was highly successful, grossing over US$62.7 million ($154.51 million in 2025 dollars.) and earning the Pollstar Concert Industry Award for Most Creative Stage Production. The final show in Nice was filmed and broadcast on HBO, before being released exclusively on LaserDisc as Blond Ambition World Tour Live, while the tour was further documented in Alek Keshishian's film Madonna: Truth or Dare (1991). Blond Ambition has since been recognized as one of the most influential concert tours in pop music history.

== Background ==
In January 1989, Pepsi-Cola announced a US$5 million endorsement deal with Madonna, featuring her and her then-upcoming single "Like a Prayer" in a television commercial. The agreement also included Pepsi's sponsorship of Madonna's next concert tour, initially announced as the Like a Prayer World Tour. The singer intended the commercial to serve as a global launch for the song prior to its official release—an unprecedented move in the music industry—while Pepsi sought to associate its brand with her image. Titled "Make a Wish", the commercial premiered during the worldwide broadcast of the 31st Annual Grammy Awards on February 22, 1989, reaching an estimated 250 million viewers.

The following day, Madonna premiered the "Like a Prayer" music video on MTV. Featuring religious imagery such as churches, stigmata, burning crosses resembling Ku Klux Klan symbolism, and the singer kissing a Black saint, the video provoked immediate backlash from religious groups worldwide, including the Holy See. Critics condemned what they viewed as blasphemous imagery and called for a boycott of Pepsi and its subsidiaries. In response, Pepsi withdrew the commercial and terminated its sponsorship agreement, effectively derailing plans for the Like a Prayer World Tour.

With her touring plans postponed, Madonna turned her attention to film, starring in Dick Tracy and recording its companion soundtrack album, I'm Breathless. During this period, her manager Freddy DeMann secured alternative sponsorship from Japanese electronics company Pioneer, allowing plans for a new world tour to move forward in the summer of 1990. Since 1987's Who's That Girl World Tour, Madonna had expanded her creative ambitions through Broadway work and increasingly used her music as a vehicle for personal expression and commentary. She viewed translating this approach to the stage as a natural progression.

Sire Records officially announced the Blond Ambition World Tour on November 16, 1989, with Madonna's performance of "Express Yourself" at the MTV Video Music Awards widely regarded as a preview. The tour ultimately supported both I'm Breathless and Madonna's fourth studio album, Like a Prayer (1989). Belgian electronic group Technotronic served as the tour's opening act.

== Development ==
=== Conception and staging ===
Madonna described the show as "much more theatrical than anything I've ever done". Rejecting the idea of simply "standing in front of a band", she compared it to an "emotional journey" encompassing "light and dark, joy and sorrow, redemption and salvation". According to biographer J. Randy Taraborrelli, she exercised near-total creative control. Her brother Christopher Ciccone served as art director, while collaborator Vincent Paterson co-directed and choreographed the show. Paterson recalled that Madonna sought to move beyond the traditional concert format and encouraged a rule-breaking approach; "instead of just presenting songs, [she] wanted to combine fashion, Broadway, rock, and performance arts". Madonna explained that she tried to make the show "accommodate [her] own short attention span": "We put the songs together so there was an emotional arc. I basically thought of vignettes for every song".

To support the show's theatrical structure, Madonna insisted on reworking her songs. "Like a Prayer", "Express Yourself", and "Into the Groove" (1985) were performed in intensified arrangements reminiscent of their Shep Pettibone remixes, while others were more radically transformed—most notably "Like a Virgin" (1984), reworked as a slow, Middle Eastern–influenced piece, and "Material Girl" (1985), delivered in a deliberately comic midwestern accent. Paterson recalled that this arrangement for "Like a Virgin" was inspired by Israeli-Yemenite singer Ofra Haza, particularly her song "Im Nin'alu"; "it had a hot Middle Eastern sound that was cutting edge in world music. I took it to Madonna. [...] [She] loved [its] sensual and exotic style".

Construction reportedly cost approximately US$2 million, with a stage measuring 80 feet (24 m) by 70 feet (21 m) that required more than 100 crew members and 18 trucks to transport. At its center was a large hydraulic platform from which Madonna ascended at the start of each show. The concert unfolded across a series of themed environments, separated by a rising and falling curtain and inspired by the fashion and architecture of the 1920s, 30s, and 40s. The opening sequence—based on Fritz Lang's Metropolis (1927) and the "Express Yourself" music video—featured industrial elements such as smoke funnels, exposed piping, suspended cables, and a central staircase. Later segments transformed the stage into a boudoir with a red velvet bed, a cathedral-like setting framed by Corinthian columns, votive candles, a descending stained-glass scrim, and later a Dick Tracy–inspired environment, which Madonna included to foreground her work in film. "Most people don't associate me with movies", she explained. "But I know I have a much bigger following than Warren [Beatty] does, and a lot of my audience isn't even aware of who he is". The final act drew on Art Deco imagery, featuring a semicircular double staircase and backdrops based on cutout reproductions of Tamara de Lempicka's paintings, alongside props such as a grand piano and a large illuminated cross.

=== Ensemble and rehearsals ===
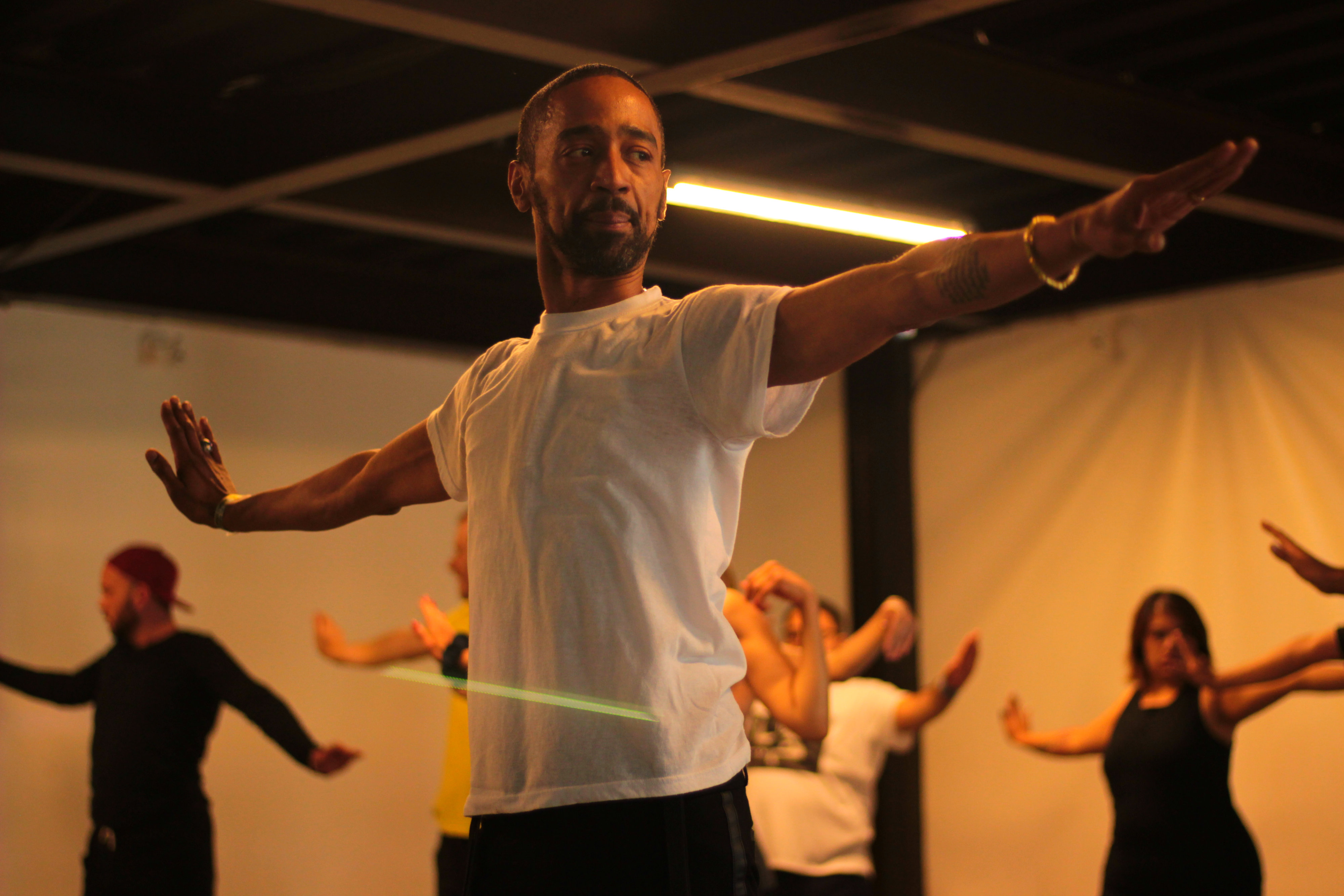
Jose Gutierez Xtravaganza (pictured in 2017) was one of the first dancers chosen for the tour.

The touring ensemble consisted of seven dancers and eight musicians, as well as two backing vocalists, Niki Haris and Donna De Lory. Jai Winding served as music director and also played keyboards, supported by Kevin Kendrick and Mike McKnight. Darryl Jones performed on bass, Carlos Rios and David Williams played guitar, Jonathan Moffett handled drums, and Luis Conte provided percussion. John Draper served as tour manager, with Chris Lamb overseeing production. Auditions were held in New York City and Los Angeles, advertised through Daily Variety with a call seeking "fierce" male dancers. Among the first selected were Luis Camacho and Jose Gutierez Xtravaganza, whom Madonna had personally invited after they introduced her to voguing, an underground ballroom style she wanted to feature prominently in the show. Additional dancers included Carlton Wilborn, Oliver Crumes, Kevin Stea, Gabriel Trupin, and Salim Gauwloos. Madonna deliberately assembled a racially and stylistically diverse troupe, viewing the dancers as performers and actors rather than background embellishment.

Rehearsals took place at Walt Disney Studios in Burbank, California, where the choreography, staging, and technical elements were developed. Wilborn later described the process as highly demanding, likening rehearsals to boot camp. Madonna rehearsed with the dancers for several hours daily before joining band rehearsals, often spending additional time in costume fittings. To support the physically demanding choreography while maintaining live vocals, Madonna used a hands-free radio-frequency headset microphone with the capsule mounted on a boom extending toward the mouth. Its prominent use during the tour helped popularize the design, which became widely known as the "Madonna mic".

=== Fashion ===
"When Madonna first called me in 1989, it was two days before my ready-to-wear show, and I thought my assistant was joking. I was a big fan. She asked me if I would do the tour. She knew what she wanted – a pinstripe suit, the feminine corsetry. Madonna likes my clothes because they combine the masculine and the feminine. It was, that no, that yes, no, yes, no".

— Jean Paul Gaultier on working with Madonna.

For the tour's wardrobe, Madonna enlisted French designer Jean Paul Gaultier, as she was drawn to his irreverence and sense of humor. She contacted him directly with a handwritten letter asking him to design the costumes. Gaultier, already an admirer of the singer, accepted immediately, later observing that even before achieving fame Madonna had used clothing provocatively—wearing visible bras, sheer fabrics, and religious symbols as jewelry. Working closely with Madonna and stylist Marlene Stewart, Gaultier spent nearly three months refining the designs through repeated meetings in New York and Paris.

The designer later described the process as intense, recalling hundreds of sketches and revisions before Madonna approved the final looks. His approach emphasized the natural curves of the female body, resulting in designs that included two corsets with conical-shaped cups—one in peach-toned satin and the other in gold. Gaultier traced the concept to a childhood memory of seeing a corset at an exhibition with his grandmother, recalling his fascination with flesh tones, satin, and lace. Other pieces included body-hugging undergarments, a pinstripe suit, pajama-style looks inspired by menswear, a cage vest, and a black mini-dress trimmed with marabou.

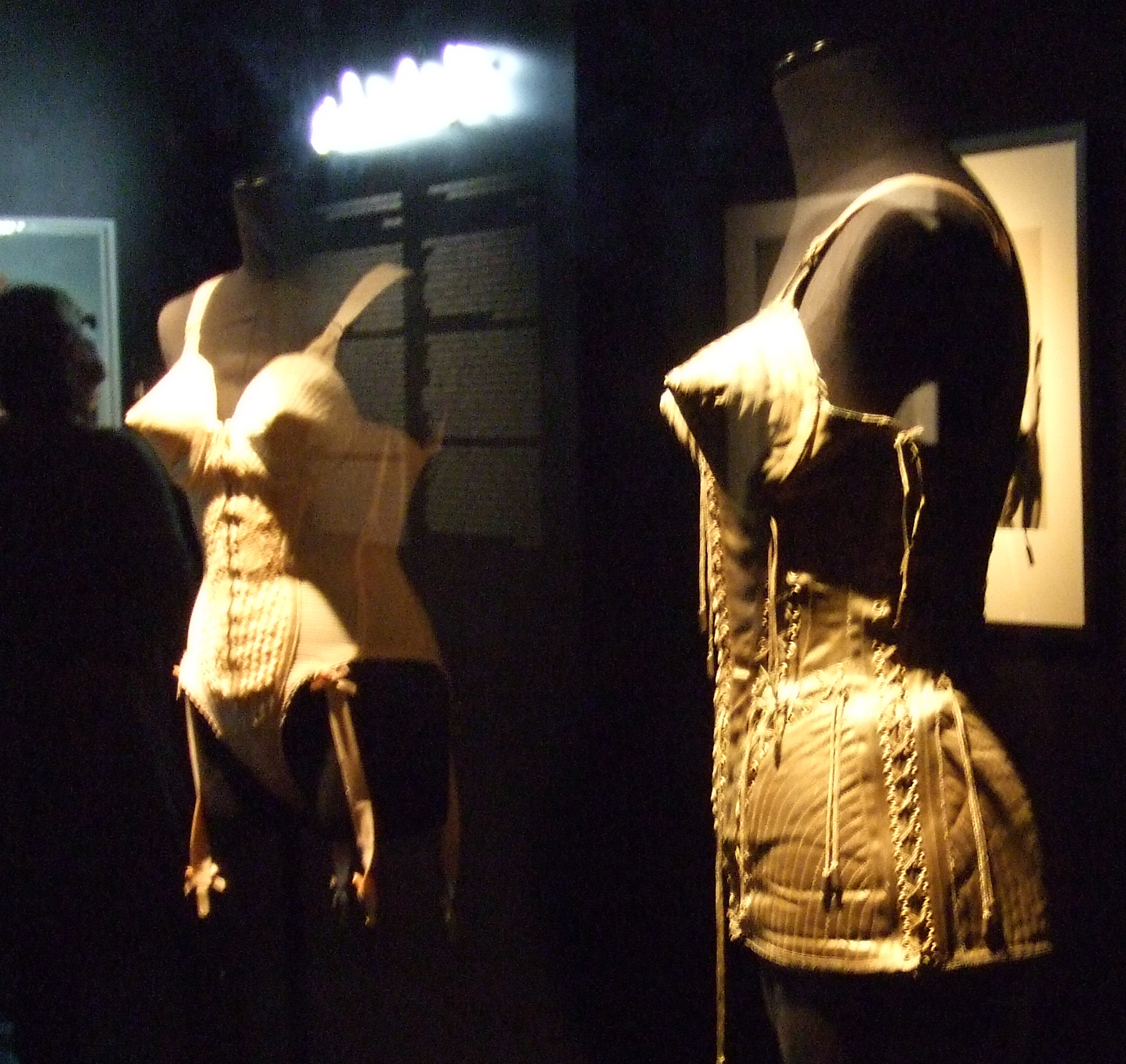
The conical corsets Gaultier created for the tour.

By her part, Stewart's approach differed from Gaultier's, emphasizing character and narrative over standalone fashion. She viewed each costume as an extension of Madonna's onstage persona rather than a purely aesthetic choice. Drawing on her long collaboration with the singer—dating back to 1984—Stewart explained that Madonna prioritized emotional and thematic authenticity above conventional glamour.

Costumes were tailored to specific songs: For "Vogue" (1990), Madonna wore a "tough, black, Clockwork-Orange"–inspired ensemble with knee pads, reworking the long black fitted coat she originally wore in the song's music video—a look itself inspired by Audrey Hepburn in My Fair Lady (1964). "Papa Don't Preach" (1986) and "Oh Father" (1989) featured a black clerical robe with gold embroidery and insignia layered over a hooded chiffon dress. The Dick Tracy–inspired segment drew directly from the film's aesthetic, with the singer and dancers styled in 1930s–influenced looks, including body-hugging gowns, a green-and-white vaudeville-style corset, oversized trench coats, and fedoras. The garments were constructed to withstand the physical demands of the choreography, with each piece double-sewn using elastic thread to allow flexibility and durability.

Niki Haris later remarked that with Madonna, wardrobe choices were never incidental, recalling that "it always comes down to clothes and shoes". Additionally, Madonna's styling evolved slightly over the course of the tour: she wore a synthetic ponytail clip on extension during the Asian and North American legs, later switching to a looser, curly hairstyle for the European shows.

== Concert synopsis ==
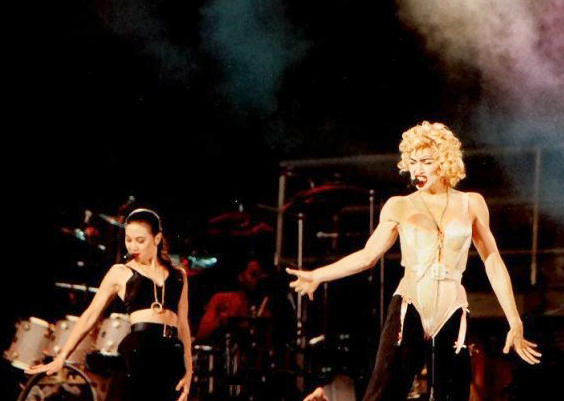
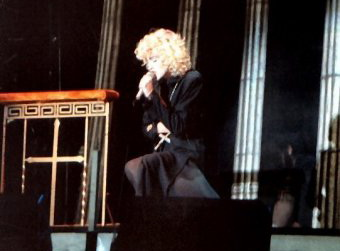
Madonna opening the concert with "Express Yourself" (left) and performing "Live to Tell" on a prie-dieu (right)

The concert opened with an industrial staging built from steel beams, cables, and staircases, as dancers appeared first in choreographed routines before Madonna rose onto the stage via the hydraulic platform to perform "Express Yourself", which incorporated a lyrical sample of "Everybody" (1982). The elaborate choreography included voguing, humping and simulated masturbation. The singer wore a pin-striped suit layered over the Gaultier conical corset. "Open Your Heart" followed with a chair-based dance sequence, while "Causing a Commotion" featured a mock fight between Madonna, Haris and De Lory. The segment concluded with an energetic "Where's the Party".

The Religious act began with a slow, sitar-influenced version of "Like a Virgin" performed on a red velvet bed as dancers framed the stage; the number included a moment where the singer mimed masturbation and climax. This transitioned into "Like a Prayer", staged with votive candles and religious imagery, before Madonna performed "Live to Tell" on a prie-dieu. Midway through the sequence, she incorporated elements of "Oh Father", supported by an appearance from Carlton Wilborn dressed in clerical attire. The segment concluded with an energetic rendition of "Papa Don't Preach".

"Sooner or Later" opened the Dick Tracy act. Madonna appeared seated atop a grand piano in a long black robe, which she removed for "Hanky Panky", where she was again joined by Haris and De Lory. At the end of the performance, she would tell the audience: "You all know the pleasures of a good spanking, don't you? [...] When I hurt people, I feel better, you know what I mean?" The segment closed with "Now I'm Following You", performed as a choreographed duet alongside a dancer dressed as Dick Tracy, while the ensemble—wearing yellow trench coats and fedoras—did a kickline.

The Art Deco act began with "Material Girl", which saw Madonna, Haris, and De Lory performing underneath vintage salon hair dryers, and interacting playfully with the audience using faux dollar-bill props. "Cherish" followed, with Madonna playing the harp as dancers appeared dressed as mermen. The segment continued with "Into the Groove", performed alongside leather-clad dancers, before closing with "Vogue", which used cutouts of Tamara de Lempicka's paintings as backdrops, and had Madonna and the dancers recreating the original choreography from the music video.

The first encore was "Holiday", which had Madonna wearing a polka dot blouse and white trousers with flounced hems. The show closed with "Keep it Together", incorporating lyrics from Sly and the Family Stone's "Family Affair" (1971). Madonna and her dancers performed a chair-based routine before the ensemble exited the stage, leaving her alone to repeat the line Keep people together forever and ever.

== Critical reception ==
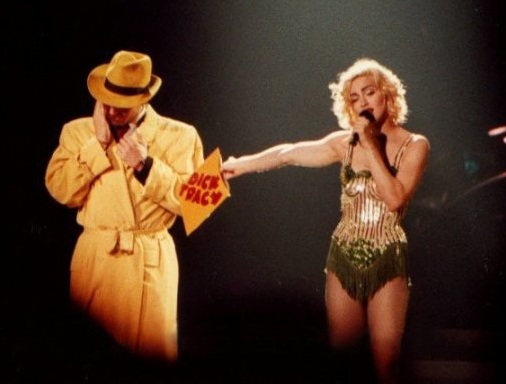
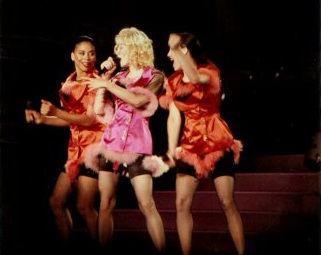
Lucy O'Brien was critical of the Dick Tracy act (left), calling it "the least dynamic part of the show", while Richard Harrington singled out "Material Girl" (right) as the concert's "funniest" number.

The tour received generally positive reviews. In Madonna: An Intimate Biography, Taraborrelli described the show as a fast-paced spectacle in which overt sexuality and religious imagery collided in tightly choreographed form. Rolling Stone echoed this assessment, while Los Angeles Times critics highlighted the depth of Madonna's catalog and the Broadway-level staging that framed it. Daryl Easlea similarly characterized the production as a "triumph of pacing, well-chosen material, and, above all, fun", calling it "the must-see tour of the year". Reviewers from The Pittsburgh Press compared the show to a high-energy theatrical revue, praising its elaborate set pieces, costume changes, and overall polish.

Writing for the Dallas Morning News, Tom Maurstad described it as a "musical extravaganza", though he criticized minor onstage missteps, including Madonna mixing up Dallas with Houston when addressing the crowd. Peter Buckley, author of The Rough Guide to Rock, praised the production and said it was "an imaginative take of the staging of a stadium gig". Montgomery Brower and Todd Gold, from People, called it a "105-minute hullabaloo amazing for its breadth of controversy". Others, including Gay Times and The Washington Post, observed that despite its precision and scale, the show retained a sense of spontaneity and felt like a live extension of Madonna's music videos.

Writing in the Orlando Sentinel, a critic described Madonna as performing at "peak creative form", framing Blond Ambition as "the world championship of rock theatricals". The review highlighted the Religious segment as one of the production's most commanding sequences, praising its ensemble staging and dramatic intensity. Critics from The Baltimore Sun and Chicago Tribune highlighted Madonna's charisma and physicality, with Greg Kot praising her stage presence and singling out "Like a Virgin" as both seductive and self-aware. Writing for Maclean's, Brian D. Johnson described the show as a relentless display of stamina, unfolding like a "kaleidoscope of sexual decadence". Newsday's Frank DeCaro observed the rapid succession of visual transformations, likening the show to "a night at the Roxy, the Pyramid and Studio 54 in its heyday, all rolled into one". In contrast, John Leland noted that while press and publicity had promised outrage, audiences were ultimately "not shocked", instead finding the show "amusing, stimulating, or diverting", but rarely scandalizing.

Some reviewers were more reserved. Jon Pareles of The New York Times described Blond Ambition as a highly stylized and tightly controlled production, in which Madonna presented a series of choreographed personas rather than a conventional concert performance. While acknowledging its ambition, he criticized the heavy reliance on prerecorded vocals and argued that the emphasis on precision and spectacle made the show feel "airless" and emotionally distant. Similarly, Harrington wrote that some numbers "suffered from overly tight choreography that left little to chance, less to spontaneity and nothing to the imagination", adding that the "hyperkinetic" dancing often felt like "busywork" masking the songs' shortcomings. Both Variety and the Spanish newspaper El País questioned the extent of live vocals during the concert, with the former also criticizing Madonna’s attempts at humor. Despite these reservations, Blond Ambition was recognized for its creativity, winning the 1990 Pollstar Award for Most Creative Stage Production, earned a nomination for Major Tour of the Year, and received the Rolling Stone Critics Award for Best Tour — an honor typically associated with artists such as Bruce Springsteen.

== Commercial performance ==
The tour drew an estimated 800,000 attendees worldwide and was initially reported to have grossed around US$19 million. It opened strongly in Japan, where the first three shows at Chiba Marine Stadium sold out at 35,000 attendees each and grossed US$4.5 million. All Japanese dates sold out within days, with the leg ultimately generating an estimated US$37 million. In North America, demand was similarly intense: nearly 483,000 tickets were sold within two hours of presale, grossing US$14 million. In Los Angeles, the tour set venue records at the Memorial Sports Arena, where three shows sold out in 45 minutes and became the highest-grossing musical event in the arena's history. Proceeds from the final US date in New Jersey—over US$300,000—were donated to amfAR and dedicated to Madonna's friend Keith Haring.

The European leg was also successful, drawing large crowds in major cities, including 30,000 attendees in Rome and 50,000 at Madrid's Vicente Calderón Stadium. In Vigo, 23,000 tickets were sold for a venue with a 40,000-seat capacity, while the Gothenburg concert attracted 55,000 people, one of the city's largest audiences at the time. By the end of its run, the tour had grossed approximately $62.7 million (US$154.51 million in 2025 dollars.) across 57 shows. A portion of ticket sales was donated to the nonprofit Cities in Schools, while Madonna was ranked as the second most successful solo touring act of the period, behind only Michael Jackson.

== Controversies ==
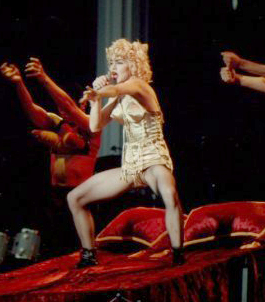
In Toronto, local police warned that Madonna could be arrested over her performance of "Like a Virgin", during which she mimed masturbation.

The tour provoked significant controversy due to its overt sexual imagery and use of Catholic symbolism. In Italy, a private association of Roman Catholics organized boycotts of the Rome and Turin dates, while Pope John Paul II publicly urged Catholics not to attend, reportedly condemning the show as "one of the most satanic in the history of humanity". The Vatican newspaper L'Osservatore Romano labeled the production "sinful" and "blasphemous", and the conservative Catholic group Famiglia Domani condemned its erotic themes.

Madonna responded at a press conference at Rome's Leonardo da Vinci–Fiumicino Airport, defending the tour as artistic expression rather than provocation. Calling herself "Italian American and proud of it", she insisted the show "in no way hurts anybody's sentiments", describing it as intended for "open minds" and meant to encourage new ways of thinking about sexuality. She further compared Blond Ambition to theater, saying it was designed to "ask questions, provoke thought, and take you on an emotional journey", and that its goal was to "break useless taboos". Despite this, a planned second concert at Rome's Stadio Flaminio was canceled amid low ticket sales and the threat of a general labor strike. Italian newspaper Il Messaggero downplayed the uproar, running the headline "A lot of noise over nothing".

Similar tensions arose in Toronto, where police warned Madonna during the first SkyDome show on May 27 that she could face arrest for "lewd and indecent display", specifically citing the simulated masturbation during "Like a Virgin". No charges were ultimately filed, and the performance went ahead unchanged after the tour's management refused to cancel the show. Madonna addressed the controversy directly during the concert, opening the show by asking the audience, "Do you believe in artistic expression and freedom of speech?" She later stated that she was willing to be arrested if necessary to defend her right to self-expression as an artist. Toronto police later confirmed that the complaints stemmed from a police detective and a Crown attorney with a strong opposition to Madonna, rather than public objection. Dancer Kevin Stea recalled that the cast was united in their willingness to face arrest, describing it as "the most powerful moment I ever felt [with Madonna]".

== Broadcasts and recordings ==
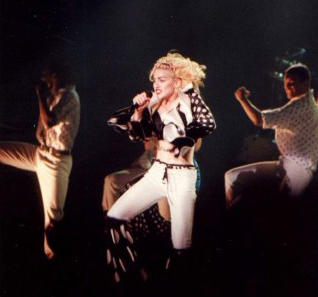
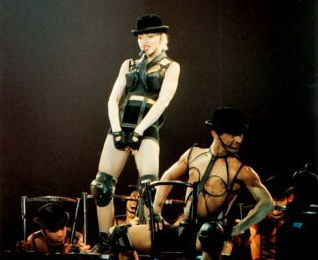
Madonna during the final performances of the tour, "Holiday" (left) and "Keep It Together" (right)

The final concert in Nice was filmed and broadcast by HBO as Live! Madonna: Blond Ambition World Tour 90. HBO acquired the rights for US$1 million and promoted the special as a live satellite event featuring "America's No.1 female pop star". The broadcast was not offered as pay-per-view, as HBO sought to distinguish itself from rival Showtime. It drew approximately 4.5 million viewers, setting a ratings record for an original HBO program at the time. Deemed provocative for television, the broadcast included Madonna’s on-air remark: "You know what I have to say to America? Get a fucking sense of humor". The concert was later released exclusively on LaserDisc as Blond Ambition World Tour Live, earning Madonna her first Grammy win for Best Long Form Music Video.

A Yokohama performance was also released exclusively in Japan as Blond Ambition – Japan Tour 90, while Spain's TVE recorded the Barcelona show and aired it internationally. Coverage drew criticism from religious outlets, including L'Osservatore Romano, and a BBC Radio 1 broadcast of the Wembley Stadium concert sparked controversy over the singer's live use of profanity.

The tour was further documented in the film Madonna: Truth or Dare (released internationally as In Bed with Madonna), directed by Alek Keshishian and released theatrically in 1991. Originally conceived as an HBO special, the project evolved into a full-length documentary film combining backstage footage with concert performances. The film grossed over US$15 million (US$36.97 million in 2025 dollars.) and received largely positive reviews, with Rolling Stone calling Madonna "a force of nature". In 2018, The Guardian named it the greatest music documentary of all time. Madonna was nevertheless nominated for a Razzie Award for Worst Actress. The 2016 documentary Strike a Pose chronicled the life of six of the dancers after the tour.

== Legacy ==
Blond Ambition has been widely cited for its unprecedented theatricality, fashion, and narrative ambition—elements that were largely uncommon in large-scale pop concerts at the time. Writing for People magazine, Drew Mackie stated that the tour "changed the pop-culture landscape" noting that its division into thematic acts reflected both an unusual level of creative planning and "the sheer volume of material Madonna had to work with". Lucy O'Brien observed that while the singer had already experimented with "conceptual musical theatre as concert" on her Who's That Girl tour, it was Blond Ambition where "art, spectacle and dance really came together". Author Courtney E. Smith argued that the tour "forever changed audience expectations for pop concerts", adding that even those who didn't attend were likely familiar with its imagery.

Several collaborators and critics emphasized Madonna's intent to challenge conventions. Reflecting on the tour, Paterson noted that although Madonna "wasn't 'the Queen' yet", it was clear during rehearsals that Blond Ambition would propel her to a new level, observing that much of what she did on the tour "had never been done before". He attributed the show's enduring impact to Madonna's fearlessness in addressing sexuality, gender roles, and religion, and to her commitment to being "true to herself and what she believes in"—a quality Paterson identified as both the source of the controversy and the creative freedom that defined the tour. Dancer Luis Camacho later said Madonna had effectively "set the stage" for future concert productions, a view echoed by both Daryl Easlea and Gay Times' Scott Anderson, who concluded that Blond Ambition fundamentally altered how artists present stadium and arena shows.

Critics have framed Blond Ambition as the blueprint for the modern pop concert. Writing for Billboard, Sal Cinquemani described it as "the mother of the modern pop concert" citing the Gaultier–designed costumes, Broadway-style sets, and quasi-narrative arc. He singled out the Religious segment as one of the most daring achievements in touring history, describing its progression—from simulated masturbation to confrontations with paternal and religious authority—as "among the most audaciously conceived and impeccably executed moments of stagecraft". According to VH1's Christopher Rosa, the tour cemented Madonna's status as a "cultural tour-de-force and groundbreaking pop artist", while The Advocate's Gina Vivinetto named it her best tour, writing that "until Blond Ambition came along, we had no idea what a live concert could be". Billboard's Jon O'Brien later observed that after Blond Ambition, audiences were no longer content to watch pop stars simply perform hits, as elaborate production values and strong narrative arcs became integral to tours.

The tour's legacy has been repeatedly reaffirmed through retrospective rankings and critical reassessments. Rolling Stone credited Madonna with having "reinvented the pop megatour itself", later including Blond Ambition among "The 50 greatest concerts of the last 50 years". Q magazine similarly named it one of the "10 greatest gigs of all time", with Sylvia Patterson noting that it was among the first global pop tours to fully adopt Broadway-style production values and a narrative arc. The Guardian's Mark Beaumont described the tour as setting a "new bar for confrontational theatricality", while Alim Kheraj later included it among the 50 gigs that changed music for reshaping the blueprint of modern pop shows.

=== In fashion ===
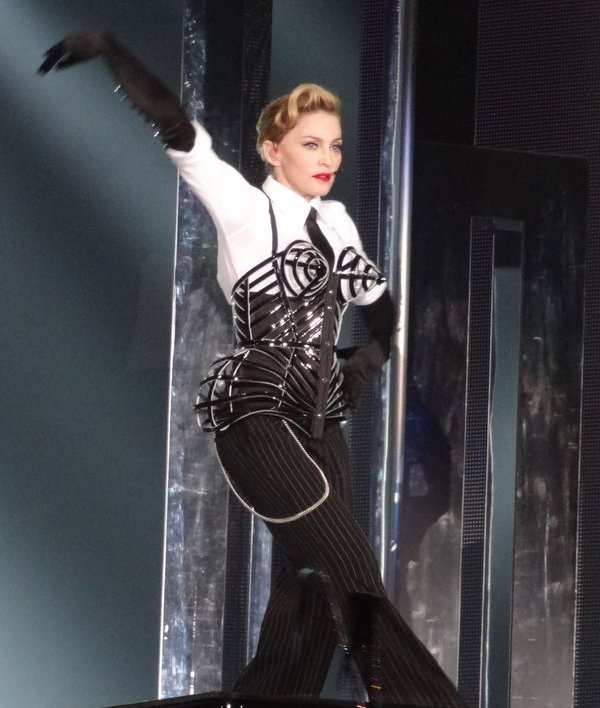
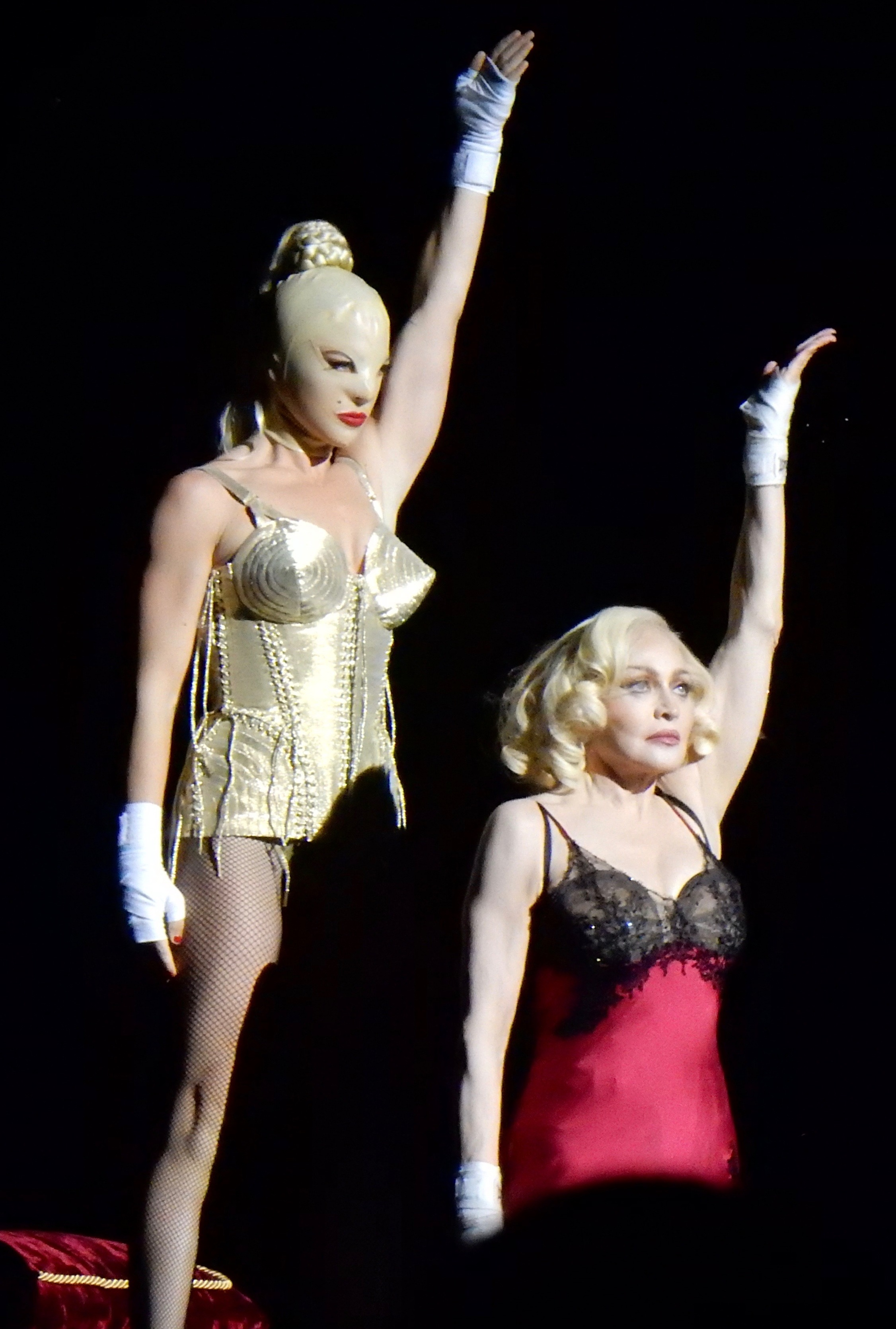
Madonna wearing a metallic reinterpretation of the conical corset during the MDNA Tour (left, pictured in 2012), and performing on the Celebration Tour (right, pictured in 2023) alongside a dancer dressed in a costume from the Blond Ambition Tour.

The tour has also influenced the fashion world. Fashion writer Macarena San Martín described the Gaultier conical corset as an "emblematic symbol of fashion in the early '90s", while Billboard's Gregory DelliCarpini Jr. argued that it redefined the female silhouette and encouraged designers to bring provocation and structure into lingerie-inspired outerwear. Nina Terrero of Entertainment Weekly similarly wrote that Madonna "birthed a major fashion moment" by foregrounding the corset as a statement of power rather than decoration.

Scholars and critics have interpreted the garment as a radical reworking of gender and sexual symbolism. Fashion historian Harold Koda suggested that the singer's use of an undergarment as outerwear asserted control over the gaze and destabilized traditional dynamics of sexual objectification. Fashion academds Adam Geczy and Vicki Karaminas viewed the conical corset as simultaneously evoking breasts and the phallus, arguing that Madonna's image marked an unprecedented transformation of feminine identity in pop culture. Rebecca Dana from The Daily Beast later described the corset's "genius" as lying in its subversion of softness and passivity, turning symbols of femininity into instruments of confrontation.

The corset's influence has persisted across generations of pop performers and fashion designers, with reinterpretations worn by Lady Gaga, Katy Perry, and Rihanna, among others. One original piece sold at auction in 2001 for over US$21,000. Gaultier later revisited the design for Madonna's 2012 MDNA Tour, reimagining it in leather and metal as a three-dimensional exploration of masculine and feminine forms. Reviewing the tour's 30th anniversary, Vogue's Liam Hess wrote that the corset is now so embedded in pop and fashion history that it "requires little introduction", crediting it with empowering female performers to express sexuality on their own terms.

Beyond the corset, Madonna's high ponytail—worn during the Asian and North American legs—became a defining visual motif, with People magazine reporting that fans regularly emulated the look at concerts. The imagery has continued to resurface in Madonna's later work, including the Celebration Tour (2023–2024), which featured visual callbacks to Blond Ambition, including a red velvet bed sequence and costumes referencing the original corset. Commentators such as Mark Elliott have argued that no other artist has so completely owned an image born from a live performance, while critics including Mark Beaumont and David Goldberg have framed the look as emblematic of Blond Ambition's central rupture: the presentation of feminine sexuality as strength, authorship, and spectacle rather than titillation. The corset paired with the ponytail has since become one of Madonna's most iconic and emblematic looks. (Note: Attributed to multiple references)

=== In the work of other artists and popular culture ===
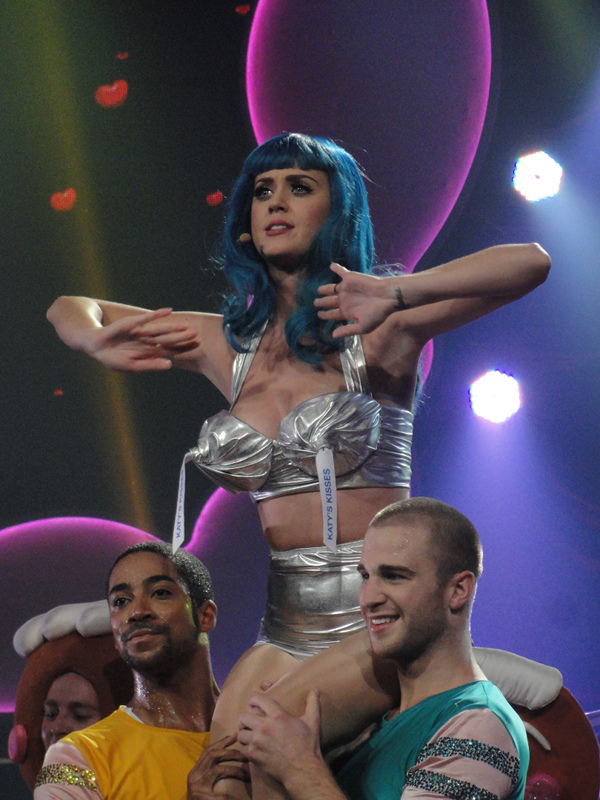
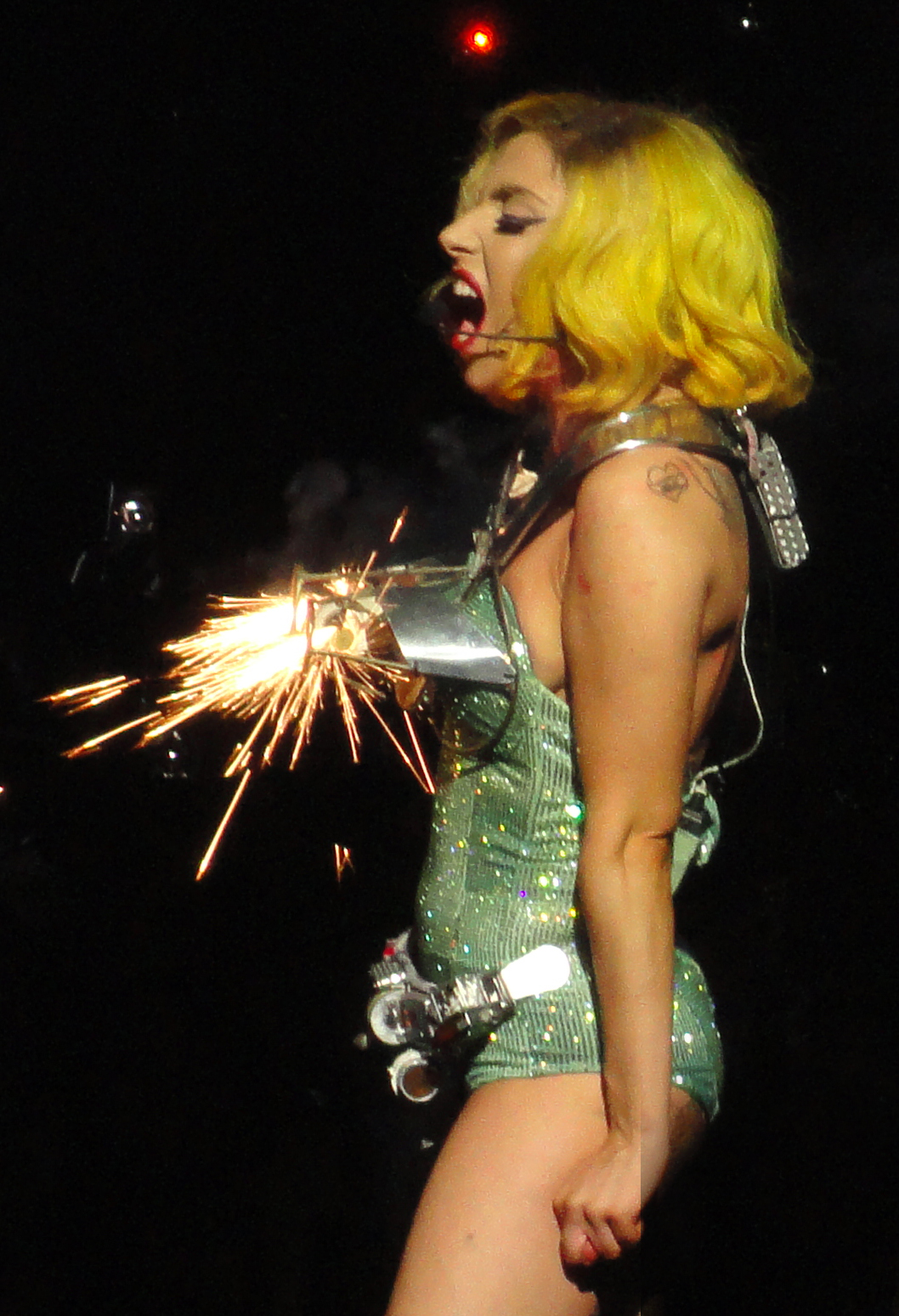
The conical corset has been recreated by contemporary artists such as Katy Perry (left, pictured in 2011) and Lady Gaga (right, pictured in 2010), whose performances also reflect Blond Ambition's broader influence.

Influence of the tour has been traced across subsequent generations of pop performers. NME's El Hunt wrote: "Think of the whips and chains of Rihanna's 'S&M', Ariana Grande's 'Side to Side' and countless other pop greats who emerged post-Madonna, and traces of Blond Ambition linger in their every move". The music video for Lady Gaga's 2010 single "Alejandro" was deemed a "visual love letter" to Madonna and the tour. Kylie Minogue's 1991 Let's Get to It Tour was criticized for its similarities to Blond Ambition and branded a "parody". Critics have identified Blond Ambition's imprint on live performances and tours by Michael Jackson, Pink, Beyoncé, Katy Perry, Miley Cyrus, Marilyn Manson, Nicki Minaj, and Justin Bieber. Beyond music, the tour's use of a headset microphone influenced performance technology; producer Jon Landau cited Madonna's example when adapting similar head-mounted cameras for motion-capture work on James Cameron's Avatar (2009).

The Blond Ambition aesthetic has also been repeatedly referenced in film and television. Actress Stephanie Faracy parodied Madonna's conical corset and ponytail look in the film Hocus Pocus (1993). In 2020, the series Pose directly engaged with the tour in the episode "What Would Candy Do?", in which characters Damon (Ryan Jamaal Swain) and Ricky (Dyllón Burnside) audition to be backup dancers. Writing for W magazine, Brooke Marine argued that while the tour is often remembered for Gaultier's cone bra, its cultural power rested equally with Madonna's dancers—particularly queer men of color—stating that without them, Blond Ambition "would not have been as effective or as subversive".

== Set list ==
Set list and samples adapted per Madonna's official website and the notes and track listing of Blond Ambition World Tour Live.

Act 1: Metropolis

1. "Express Yourself" (Contains excerpts from "Everybody")
2. "Open Your Heart"
3. "Causing a Commotion"
4. "Where's the Party"

Act 2: Religious

5. "Like a Virgin"
6. "Like a Prayer" (Contains excerpts from "Act of Contrition")
7. "Live to Tell" / "Oh Father"
8. "Papa Don't Preach"

Act 3: Dick Tracy

9. "Sooner or Later"
10. "Hanky Panky"
11. "Now I'm Following You"

Act 4: Art Deco

12. "Material Girl"
13. "Cherish"
14. "Into the Groove" (Contains elements of "Ain't Nobody Better")
15. "Vogue"

Act 5: Encore

16. "Holiday" (Contains elements of "(Are You Ready) Do the Bus Stop")
17. "Keep It Together" (Contains excerpts from "Family Affair")

== Tour dates ==
List of concerts (Note: Attributed to multiple references)
Date (1990)	City	Country	Venue	Opening act	Attendance	Revenue
April 13	Chiba	Japan	Chiba Marine Stadium	Technotronic	105,000 / 105,000	—N/a
April 14	Chiba	Japan	Chiba Marine Stadium	Technotronic	105,000 / 105,000	—N/a
April 15	Chiba	Japan	Chiba Marine Stadium	Technotronic	105,000 / 105,000	—N/a
April 20	Nishinomiya	Japan	Hankyu Nishinomiya Stadium	Technotronic	—N/a	—N/a
April 21	Nishinomiya	Japan	Hankyu Nishinomiya Stadium	Technotronic	—N/a	—N/a
April 22	Nishinomiya	Japan	Hankyu Nishinomiya Stadium	Technotronic	—N/a	—N/a
April 25	Yokohama	Japan	Yokohama Stadium	Technotronic	—N/a	—N/a
April 26	Yokohama	Japan	Yokohama Stadium	Technotronic	—N/a	—N/a
April 27	Yokohama	Japan	Yokohama Stadium	Technotronic	—N/a	—N/a
May 4	Houston	United States	The Summit	Technotronic	31,427 / 31,427	$881,245
May 5	Houston	United States	The Summit	Technotronic	31,427 / 31,427	$881,245
May 7	Dallas	United States	Reunion Arena	Technotronic	29,503 / 29,503	$820,914
May 8	Dallas	United States	Reunion Arena	Technotronic	29,503 / 29,503	$820,914
May 11	Los Angeles	United States	Los Angeles Memorial Sports Arena	Technotronic	77,217 / 77,217	$2,242,110
May 12	Los Angeles	United States	Los Angeles Memorial Sports Arena	Technotronic	77,217 / 77,217	$2,242,110
May 13	Los Angeles	United States	Los Angeles Memorial Sports Arena	Technotronic	77,217 / 77,217	$2,242,110
May 15	Los Angeles	United States	Los Angeles Memorial Sports Arena	Technotronic	77,217 / 77,217	$2,242,110
May 16	Los Angeles	United States	Los Angeles Memorial Sports Arena	Technotronic	77,217 / 77,217	$2,242,110
May 18	Oakland	United States	Oakland–Alameda County Coliseum Arena	Technotronic	42,608 / 42,608	$1,278,245
May 19	Oakland	United States	Oakland–Alameda County Coliseum Arena	Technotronic	42,608 / 42,608	$1,278,245
May 20	Oakland	United States	Oakland–Alameda County Coliseum Arena	Technotronic	42,608 / 42,608	$1,278,245
May 23	Rosemont	United States	Rosemont Horizon	Technotronic	33,954 / 33,954	$955,181
May 24	Rosemont	United States	Rosemont Horizon	Technotronic	33,954 / 33,954	$955,181
May 27	Toronto	Canada	SkyDome	Technotronic	80,251 / 80,251	$2,146,733
May 28	Toronto	Canada	SkyDome	Technotronic	80,251 / 80,251	$2,146,733
May 29	Toronto	Canada	SkyDome	Technotronic	80,251 / 80,251	$2,146,733
May 31	Auburn Hills	United States	The Palace of Auburn Hills	Technotronic	40,662 / 40,662	$1,199,529
June 1	Auburn Hills	United States	The Palace of Auburn Hills	Technotronic	40,662 / 40,662	$1,199,529
June 4	Worcester	United States	Worcester Centrum	Technotronic	28,000 / 28,000	$776,767
June 5	Worcester	United States	Worcester Centrum	Technotronic	28,000 / 28,000	$776,767
June 8	Landover	United States	Capital Centre	Technotronic	32,295 / 32,295	$928,193
June 9	Landover	United States	Capital Centre	Technotronic	32,295 / 32,295	$928,193
June 11	Uniondale	United States	Nassau Veterans Memorial Coliseum	Technotronic	51,000 / 51,000	$1,530,000
June 12	Uniondale	United States	Nassau Veterans Memorial Coliseum	Technotronic	51,000 / 51,000	$1,530,000
June 13	Uniondale	United States	Nassau Veterans Memorial Coliseum	Technotronic	51,000 / 51,000	$1,530,000
June 16	Philadelphia	United States	The Spectrum	Technotronic	34,821 / 34,821	$976,666
June 17	Philadelphia	United States	The Spectrum	Technotronic	34,821 / 34,821	$976,666
June 20	East Rutherford	United States	Brendan Byrne Arena	Technotronic	75,000 / 75,000	$2,250,000
June 21	East Rutherford	United States	Brendan Byrne Arena	Technotronic	75,000 / 75,000	$2,250,000
June 24	East Rutherford	United States	Brendan Byrne Arena	Technotronic	75,000 / 75,000	$2,250,000
June 25 (Note: This concert was originally set to take place on June 19 but was rescheduled due to Madonna having laryngitis)	East Rutherford	United States	Brendan Byrne Arena	Technotronic	75,000 / 75,000	$2,250,000
June 30	Gothenburg	Sweden	Eriksberg	Technotronic	55,000 / 55,000	$2,533,000
July 3	Paris	France	Palais omnisports de Paris-Bercy	Technotronic	—N/a	—N/a
July 4	Paris	France	Palais omnisports de Paris-Bercy	Technotronic	—N/a	—N/a
July 6	Paris	France	Palais omnisports de Paris-Bercy	Technotronic	—N/a	—N/a
July 10	Rome	Italy	Stadio Flaminio	Technotronic	30,000 / 30,000	—N/a
July 13	Turin	Italy	Stadio delle Alpi	Technotronic	—N/a	—N/a
July 15	Munich	West Germany	Olympia-Reitstadion Riem	Technotronic	—N/a	—N/a
July 17	Dortmund	West Germany	Westfalenhalle	Technotronic	—N/a	—N/a
July 20	London	England	Wembley Stadium	Technotronic	225,000 / 225,000	$2,578,625
July 21	London	England	Wembley Stadium	Technotronic	225,000 / 225,000	$2,578,625
July 22	London	England	Wembley Stadium	Technotronic	225,000 / 225,000	$2,578,625
July 24	Rotterdam	Netherlands	Feijenoord Stadion	Technotronic	45,000 / 45,000	—N/a
July 27	Madrid	Spain	Estadio Vicente Calderón	Technotronic	50,000 / 50,000	—N/a
July 29	Vigo	Spain	Estadio Municipal de Balaídos	Technotronic	23,000 / 40,000	—N/a
August 1	Barcelona	Spain	Estadi Olímpic de Montjuïc	Technotronic	—N/a	—N/a
August 5	Nice	France	Stade Charles-Ehrmann	Technotronic	—N/a	—N/a
Total					1,050,772 / 1,050,772 (100%)	$22,134,267

=== Canceled dates ===
List of canceled concerts
Date (1990)	City	Country	Venue	Reason
May 25	Rosemont	United States	Rosemont Horizon	Vocal cord infection
June 6	Worcester	United States	Worcester Centrum	Vocal cord infection
June 15	Philadelphia	United States	The Spectrum	Vocal cord infection
June 22	East Rutherford	United States	Brendan Byrne Arena	Vocal cord infection
July 11	Rome	Italy	Stadio Flaminio	Union strike

== Personnel ==
Adapted from the Blond Ambition World Tour 90 program.

=== Band ===
- Madonna – creator, vocals
- Niki Haris – vocals
- Donna De Lory – vocals
- Jai Winding – keyboards
- Kevin Kendrick – keyboards
- David Williams – guitar
- Darryl Jones – bass
- Jonathan Moffett – drums
- Luis Conte – percussions

=== Dancers and choreographers ===
- Luis Camacho – dancer
- Oliver Crumes – dancer
- Salim "Slam" Gauwloos – dancer
- Jose Gutierez Xtravaganza – dancer
- Kevin Stea – dancer
- Gabriel Trupin – dancer
- Carlton Wilborn – dancer
- Vincent Paterson – choreographer

=== Wardrobe ===
- Jean Paul Gaultier – designer
- Marlene Stewart – additional costumes

=== Crew ===
- Madonna – director
- Christopher Ciccone – artistic director
- Jai Winding – music director
- Freddy DeMann – personal manager
- John Draper – tour manager
- Chris Lamb – production manager
- Mike Grizel – road manager
- John McGraw – set designer
- Peter Morse – lighting director
- Joanne Gair – make-up, styling
- Julie Cherrow – massage therapist
- Robert Parr – fitness trainer
- Pamela Gatell – ambiance
- Liz Rosenberg – publicity
- Tom Hudak – stage manager
- Mark Micoli – video director

== Bibliography ==
- Baker, William; Minogue, Kylie (2002). Kylie: La La La. Hodder & Stoughton. ISBN 978-0-340-73440-7.
- Benstock, Shari; Ferriss, Suzanne (1994). On Fashion. Rutgers University Press. ISBN 978-0-8135-2033-9.
- Bignell, Jonathan (2007). Postmodern Media Culture. Edinburgh University Press. ISBN 978-81-89833-16-9.
- Bruenger, David (2016). Making Money, Making Music: History and Core Concepts. University of California Press. ISBN 978-0-520-29259-8.
- Buckley, Peter (2003). The Rough Guide Rock: The Definitive Guide to More than 1200 Artists and Bands. Rough Guides. ISBN 978-1-84353-105-0.
- Ciccone, Christopher; Leigh, Wendy (2008). Life with My Sister Madonna. Simon Spotlight Entertainment. ISBN 978-1-4165-8762-0.
- Clerk, Carol (2002). Madonnastyle. Omnibus Press. ISBN 978-0-7119-8874-3.
- Crampton, Luke; Rees, Dafydd (1991). Rock Movers and Shakers: An A-Z of People Who Made Rock Happen. ABC-CLIO. ISBN 978-0-87436-661-7.
- Dunn, Leslie C.; Jones, Nancy A. (1996). Embodied Voices: Representing Female Vocality in Western Culture. Edinburgh University Press. ISBN 978-0-521-58583-5.
- Easlea, Daryl (2012). Madonna: Blond Ambition. Backbeat Books. ISBN 978-1-61713-034-2.
- Edwards, Katie B. (2015). Rethinking Biblical Literacy. Bloomsbury Publishing. ISBN 978-0-567-05098-4.
- Fouz-Hernández, Santiago; Jarman-Ivens, Freya (2004). Madonna's Drowned Worlds. Ashgate Publishing. ISBN 978-0-7546-3372-3.
- Fryd, Hallie (2019). Scandalous!: 50 Shocking Events You Should Know About (So You Can Impress Your Friends). Zest Books LLC. ISBN 978-0-9827322-0-5.
- Gabriel, Mary (2023). Madonna: A Rebel Life. Hachette UK. ISBN 978-0316456449.
- Geczy, Adam; Karaminas, Vicki (2013). Queer Style. Bloomsbury Publishing. ISBN 978-1-84788-195-3.
- Gnojewski, Carol (2007). Madonna: Express Yourself. Enslow Publishing. ISBN 978-0-7660-2442-7.
- Guilbert, Georges-Claude (2002). Madonna as postmodern myth. McFarland. ISBN 978-0-7864-1408-6.
- Gunn, Tim; Calhoun, Ada (2012). Tim Gunn's Fashion Bible: The Fascinating History of Everything in Your Closet. Gallery Books. ISBN 978-1-4516-4387-9.
- Inglis, Ian (2006). Performance and Popular Music: History, Place and Time. Ashgate Publishing, Ltd. ISBN 978-0-7546-4057-8.
- Koda, Harold (2004). Extreme Beauty: The Body Transformed. The Metropolitan Museum of Art. ISBN 978-0-300-10312-0.
- Metz, Allen; Benson, Carol (1999). The Madonna Companion: Two Decades of Commentary. Music Sales Group. ISBN 978-0-8256-7194-4.
- Morgan, Michelle (2015). Madonna. Constable & Robinson. ISBN 978-1-4721-1886-8.
- O'Brien, Lucy (2008). Madonna: Like an Icon. Bantam Press. ISBN 978-0-593-05547-2.
- San Martin, Macarena (2011). Fashion Details: 1,000 Ideas from Neckline to Waistline, Pockets to Pleats. Rockport Publishers. ISBN 978-1-59253-716-7.
- Smith, Courtney E. (2011). Record Collecting for Girls: Unleashing Your Inner Music Nerd, One Album at a Time. Houghton Mifflin Harcourt. ISBN 978-0-547-50223-6.
- Schwichtenberg, Ramona Liera; Pribram, Deidre; Tetzlaff, Dave; Scott, Ron (2019). The Madonna Connection: Representational Politics, Subcultural Identities, And Cultural Theory. Routledge. ISBN 978-0-367-29365-9.
- Sexton, Adam (1993). Desperately Seeking Madonna: In Search of the Meaning of the World's Most Famous Woman. Delta Publishing Inc. ISBN 978-0-385-30688-1.
- Taraborrelli, J. Randy (2002). Madonna: An Intimate Biography. Simon & Schuster. ISBN 978-0-425-18669-5.
- Voller, Debbie (1999). Madonna: The Style Book. Omnibus Press. ISBN 978-0-7119-7511-8.
