= 66th Berlin International Film Festival =

2016 film festival in Berlin, Germany

- Festival poster
- Opening film: Hail, Caesar!
- Closing film: Fire at Sea
- Location: Berlin, Germany
- Founded: 1951
- Awards: Golden Bear: Fire at Sea
- Festival date: 11–21 February 2016
- Website: www.berlinale.de

Berlin International Film Festival chronology
- 67th 65th

The 66th Berlin International Film Festival was held from 11 to 21 February 2016, with American actress Meryl Streep as the president of the jury. The Honorary Golden Bear for lifetime achievement was presented to German cinematographer Michael Ballhaus.

Hail, Caesar!, directed by Joel and Ethan Coen, was selected to open the festival. The Golden Bear was awarded to the Italian documentary Fire at Sea, directed by Gianfranco Rosi, which also serves as closing night film.

== Jury ==
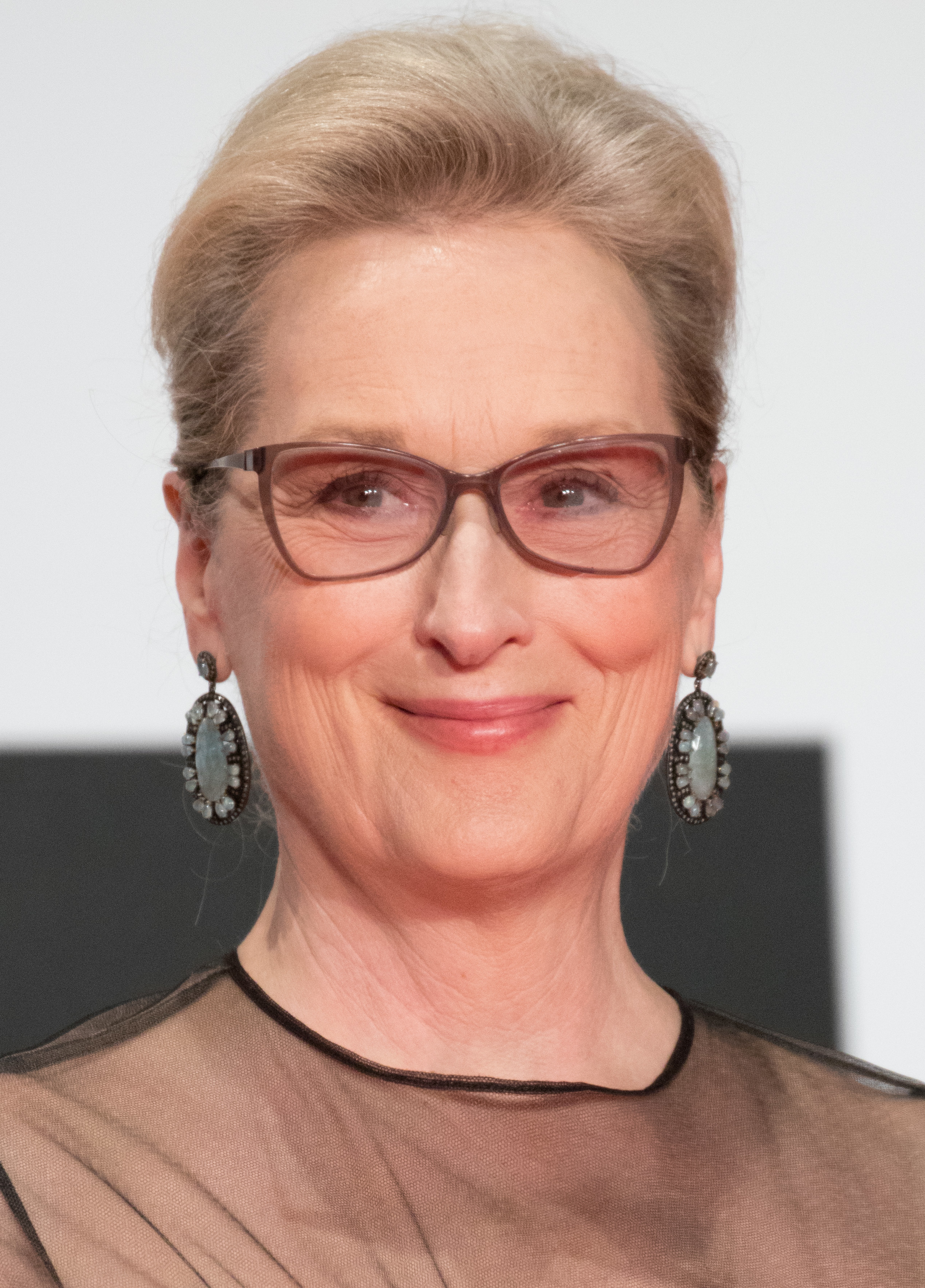
Meryl Streep, Jury President

=== Main Competition ===
- Meryl Streep, American actress - Jury President
- Lars Eidinger, German actor
- Nick James, British film critic
- Brigitte Lacombe, French photographer
- Clive Owen, British actor
- Alba Rohrwacher, Italian actress
- Małgorzata Szumowska, Polish director and screenwriter

=== Best First Feature Award Jury ===
- Michel Franco, Mexican filmmaker and producer
- Enrico Lo Verso, Italian actor
- Ursula Meier, Swiss film director

=== International Short Film Jury ===
- Sheikha Hoor Al-Qasimi, Emirates curator, artist and lecturer
- Katerina Gregos, Greek curator, writer and lecturer
- Avi Mograbi, Israeli filmmaker, video artist and lecturer
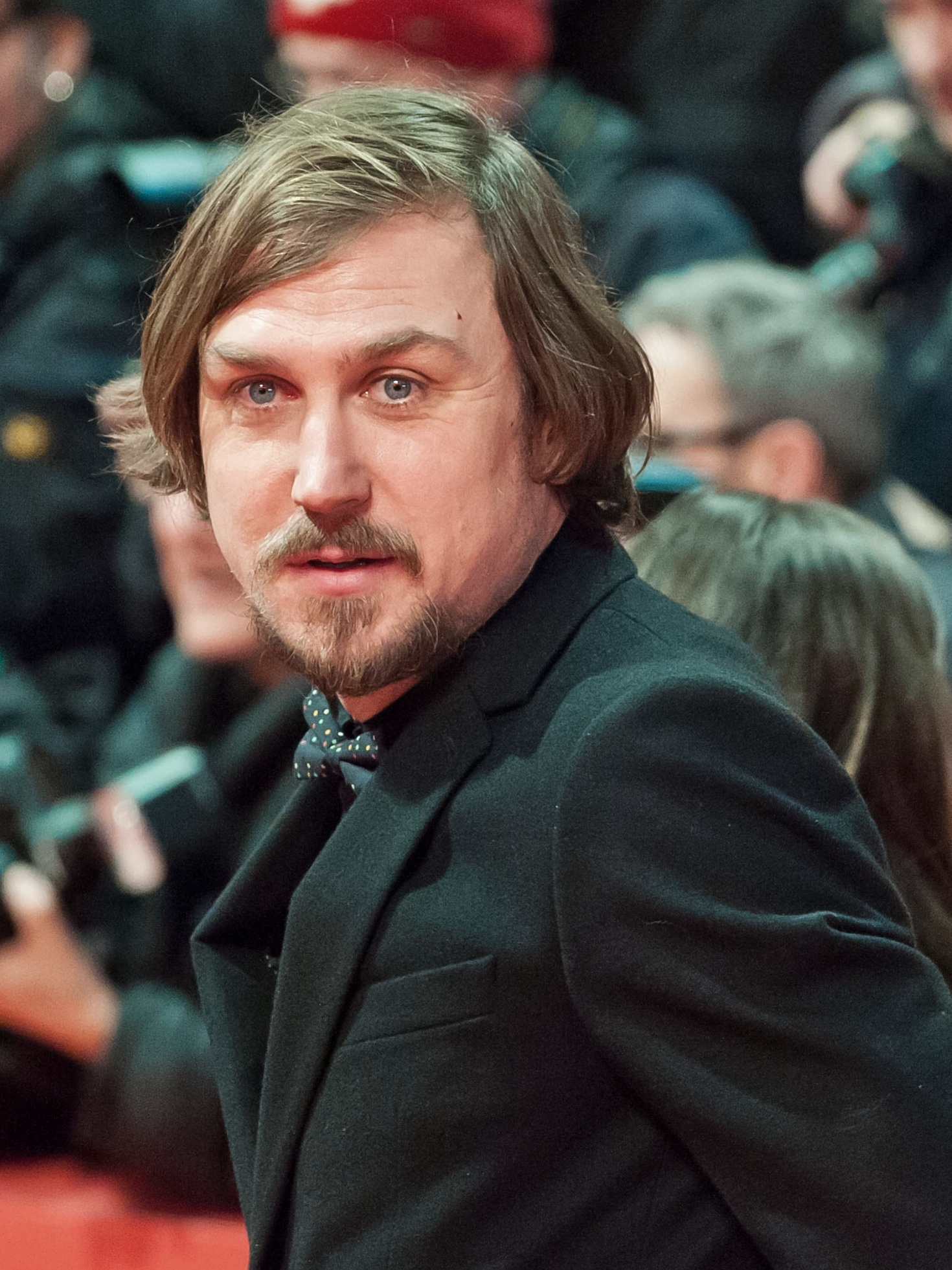
Lars Eidinger

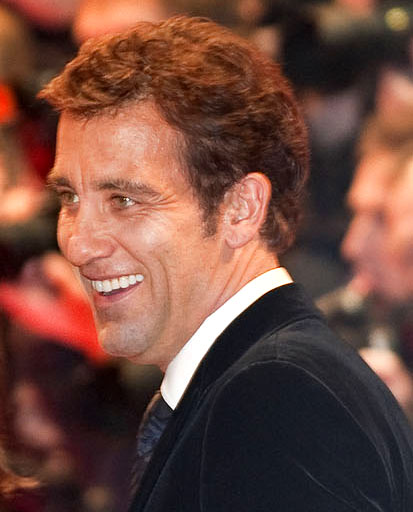
Clive Owen

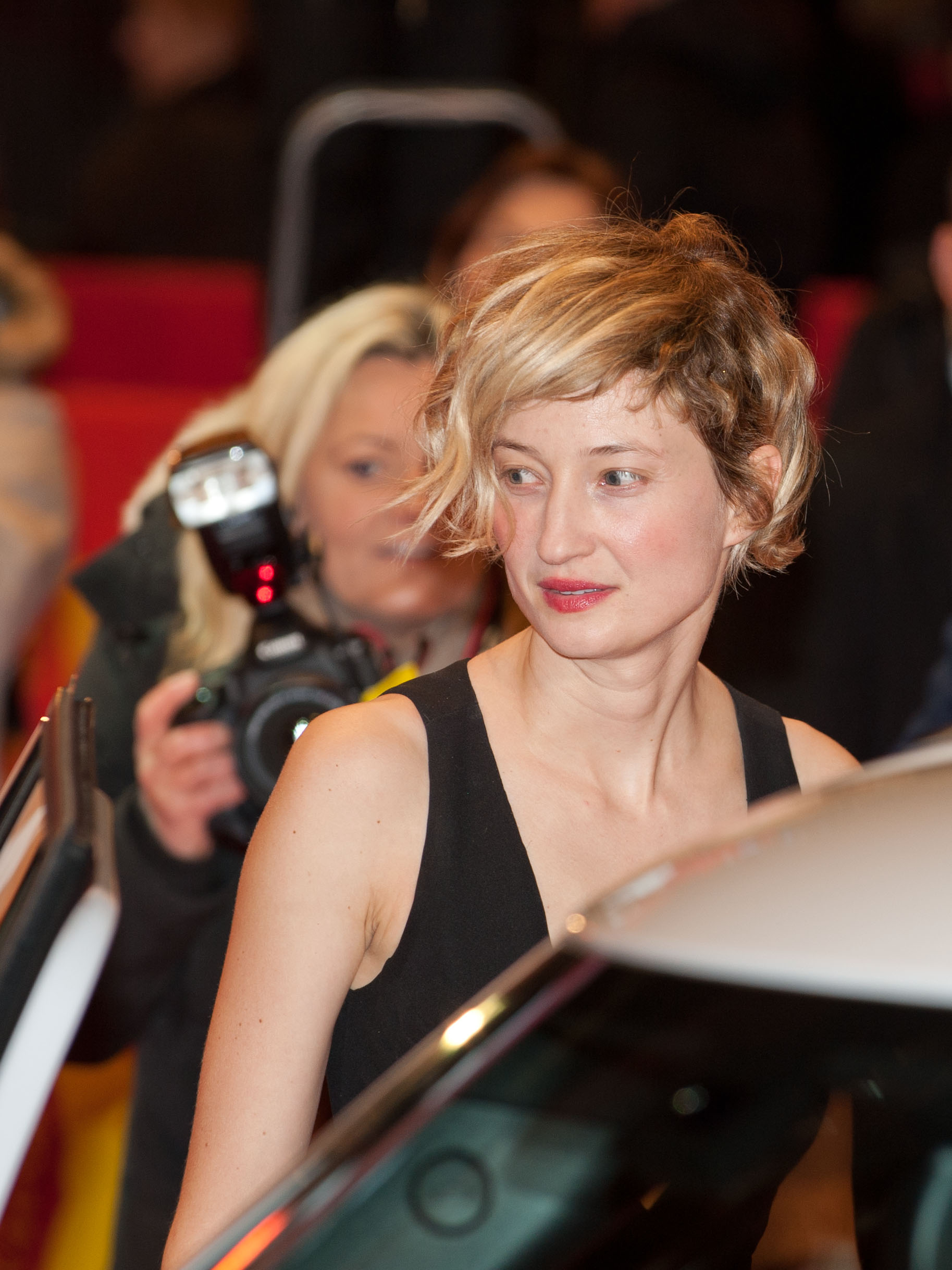
A. Rohrwacher

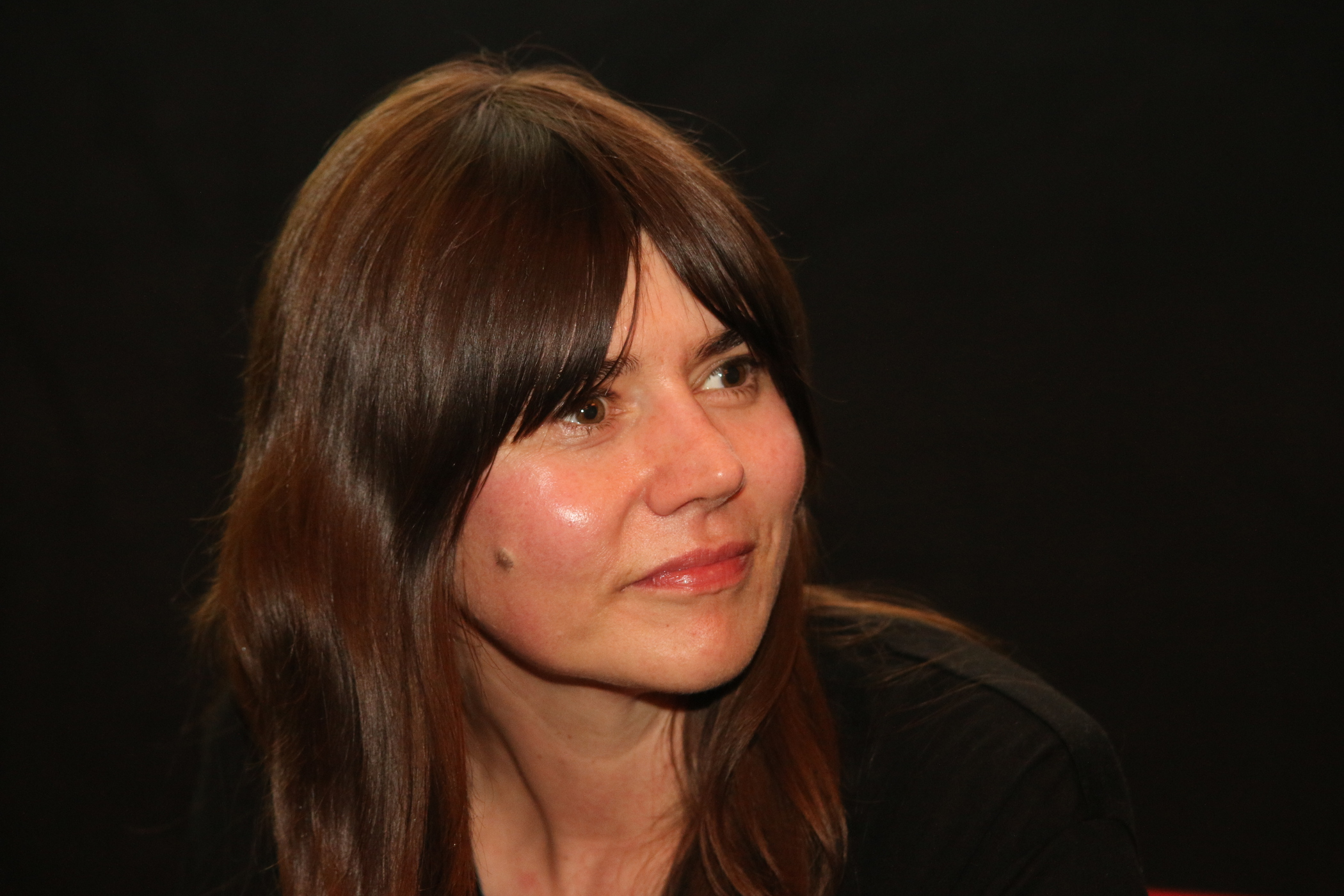
M. Szumowska

== Main Competition ==
The following films were selected for the main competition for the Golden Bear and Silver Bear awards:

English title	Original title	Director(s)	Production country
24 Weeks	24 Wochen	Anne Zohra Berrached	Germany
Alone in Berlin		Vincent Pérez	Germany, France, United Kingdom
Being 17	Quand on a 17 ans	André Téchiné	France
Boris Without Béatrice	Boris sans Béatrice	Denis Côté	Canada
The Commune	Kollektivet	Thomas Vinterberg	Denmark, Sweden, Netherlands
Crosscurrent	长江图	Yang Chao	China
Death in Sarajevo	Smrt u Sarajevu	Danis Tanović	Bosnia and Herzegovina, France
A Dragon Arrives!	اژدها وارد می‌شود!	Mani Haghighi	Iran
Fire at Sea	Fuocoammare	Gianfranco Rosi	Italy, France
Genius		Michael Grandage	United Kingdom, United States
Hedi	Inhebbek Hedi	Mohamed Ben Attia	Tunisia, Belgium, France
A Lullaby to the Sorrowful Mystery	Hele sa Hiwagang Hapis	Lav Diaz	Philippines, Singapore
Letters from War	Cartas da Guerra	Ivo Ferreira	Portugal
Midnight Special		Jeff Nichols	United States
Soy Nero		Rafi Pitts	Germany, France, Mexico
Things to Come	L'Avenir	Mia Hansen-Løve	France, Germany
United States of Love	Zjednoczone stany miłości	Tomasz Wasilewski	Poland, Sweden
Zero Days		Alex Gibney	United States

=== Out of competition ===
The following films were selected to be screened out of competition:

English title	Original title	Director(s)	Production country
Chi-Raq		Spike Lee	United States
Hail, Caesar!		Joel and Ethan Coen	United States
News from Planet Mars	Des nouvelles de la planète Mars	Dominik Moll	France, Belgium
Saint-Amour		Benoît Delépine and Gustave Kervern	France, Belgium
The Patriarch	Mahana	Lee Tamahori	New Zealand

=== Panorama ===
The following films were selected for the Panorama section:

English title	Original title	Director(s)	Production country
I, Olga Hepnarová	Já, Olga Hepnarová	Tomáš Weinreb, Petr Kazda	Czech Republic, Poland, Slovakia, France
Junction 48		Udi Aloni	Israel, Germany, United States
The First, the Last	Les Premiers, les Derniers	Bouli Lanners	France, Belgium
Maggie's Plan		Rebecca Miller	United States
Nakom		Kelly Daniela Norris, T. W. Pittman	Ghana, United States
Remainder		Omer Fast	United Kingdom, Germany
On the Other Side	S one strane	Zrinko Ogresta	Croatia, Serbia
Starve Your Dog		Hicham Lasri	Morocco
Sand Storm	סופת חול	Elite Zexer	Israel
Paris 05:59	Théo et Hugo dans le même bateau	Olivier Ducastel, Jacques Martineau	France
The Ones Below		David Farr	United Kingdom
War on Everyone		John Michael McDonagh	United Kingdom
Aloys		Tobias Nölle	Switzerland, France
The Tenth Man	El rey del Once	Daniel Burman	Argentina
Goat		Andrew Neel	United States
Fukushima, mon Amour	Grüße aus Fukushima	Doris Dörrie	Germany
Indignation		James Schamus	United States
Jonathan		Piotr J. Lewandowski	Germany
Tomcat	Kater	Klaus Händl	Austria
The Black Frost	La helada negra	Maximiliano Schonfeld	Argentina
Lantouri	لانتوری	Reza Dormishian	Iran
Little Men		Ira Sachs	United States
The Wounded Angel	Жаралы періште	Emir Baigazin	Kazakhstan, France, Germany
While the Women Are Sleeping		Wayne Wang	Japan
Time Was Endless	Antes o tempo não acabava	Sérgio Andrade, Fábio Baldo	Brazil, Germany
All of a Sudden	Auf Einmal	Aslı Özge	Germany, Netherlands, France
Much Ado About Nothing	Aquí no ha pasado nada	Alejandro Fernández Almendras	Chile, United States, France
The Bacchus Lady	죽여주는 여자	E J-yong	South Korea
Road to Istanbul	La Route d'Istanbul	Rachid Bouchareb	Algeria, France, Belgium
Don't Call Me Son	Mãe só há uma	Anna Muylaert	Brazil
You'll Never Be Alone	Nunca vas a estar solo	Álex Anwandter	Chile
Dog Days	San Fu Tian	Jordan Schiele	Hong Kong, China
Shelley		Ali Abbasi	Denmark, Sweden
Shepherds and Butchers		Oliver Schmitz	South Africa, United States, Germany

=== Panorama Dokumente ===
The following films were selected for the Panorama Dokumente section:

English title	Original title	Director(s)	Production country
Don't Blink – Robert Frank		Laura Israel	United States, France
Hotel Dallas		Livia Ungur, Sherng-Lee Huang	Romania, United States
The GDR Complex	Der Ost-Komplex	Jochen Hick	Germany
Mapplethorpe: Look at the Pictures		Fenton Bailey, Randy Barbato	United States, Germany
Mariupolis		Mantas Kvedaravičius	Lithuania, Germany, France, Ukraine
Uncle Howard		Aaron Brookner	United Kingdom, United States
Brothers of the Night	Brüder der Nacht	Patric Chiha	Austria
Curumim		Marcos Prado	Brazil
Europe, She Loves		Jan Gassmann	Switzerland, Germany
Inside the Chinese Closet		Sophia Luvarà	Netherlands
Kiki		Sara Jordenö	Sweden, United States
Strike a Pose		Ester Gould, Reijer Zwaan	Netherlands
The Lovers and the Despot		Rob Cannan, Ross Adam	United Kingdom
Weekends		Lee Dong-ha	South Korea
Who's Gonna Love Me Now?		Tomer Heymann, Barak Heymann	Israel, United Kingdom
My Land	Wu Tu	Fan Jian	China
Zona Norte		Monika Treut	Germany

=== Teddy30 ===
The following films were selected to be screened as part of Teddy Award's 30th anniversary celebration:

English title	Original title	Director(s)	Production country
1 Berlin Harlem		Lothar Lambert, Wolfram Zobus	West Germany
Different from the Others	Anders als die Andern	Richard Oswald	Germany
Before Stonewall		Greta Schiller, Robert Rosenberg	United States
The Enchantment of the Blue Sailors	Die Betörung der Blauen Matrosen	Ulrike Ottinger	West Germany
The Meadow of Things	Die Wiese der Sachen	Heinz Emigholz	West Germany
Gendernauts: A Journey Through Shifting Identities	Gendernauts – Eine Reise durch die Geschlechter	Monika Treut	Germany
I Shot Andy Warhol		Mary Harron	United States
I, You, He, She	Je, tu, il, elle	Chantal Akerman	France, Belgium
Looking for Langston		Isaac Julien	United Kingdom
Hide and Seek	Machboim	Dan Wolman	Israel
Marble Ass		Želimir Žilnik	Federal Republic of Yugoslavia
Nitrate Kisses		Barbara Hammer	United States
The Watermelon Woman		Cheryl Dunye	United States
Tongues Untied		Marlon Riggs	United States
A Whole Night	Toute une nuit	Chantal Akerman	France, Belgium
In a Glass Cage	Tras el cristal	Agustí Villaronga	Spain

=== Berlinale Special ===
The following films were selected for the Berlinale Special section:

English title	Original title	Director(s)	Production country
A Serious Game	Den allvarsamma leken	Pernilla August	Sweden, Denmark, Norway
Miles Ahead		Don Cheadle	United States
A Quiet Passion		Terence Davies	United Kingdom, Belgium
National Bird		Sonia Kennebeck	United States
Creepy		Kiyoshi Kurosawa	Japan
The Seasons in Quincy: Four Portraits of John Berger		Colin MacCabe, Christopher Roth, Bartek Dziadosz, Tilda Swinton	United Kingdom
Where to Invade Next		Michael Moore	United States
The Music of Strangers: Yo-Yo Ma and the Silk Road Ensemble		Morgan Neville	United States

== Official Awards ==
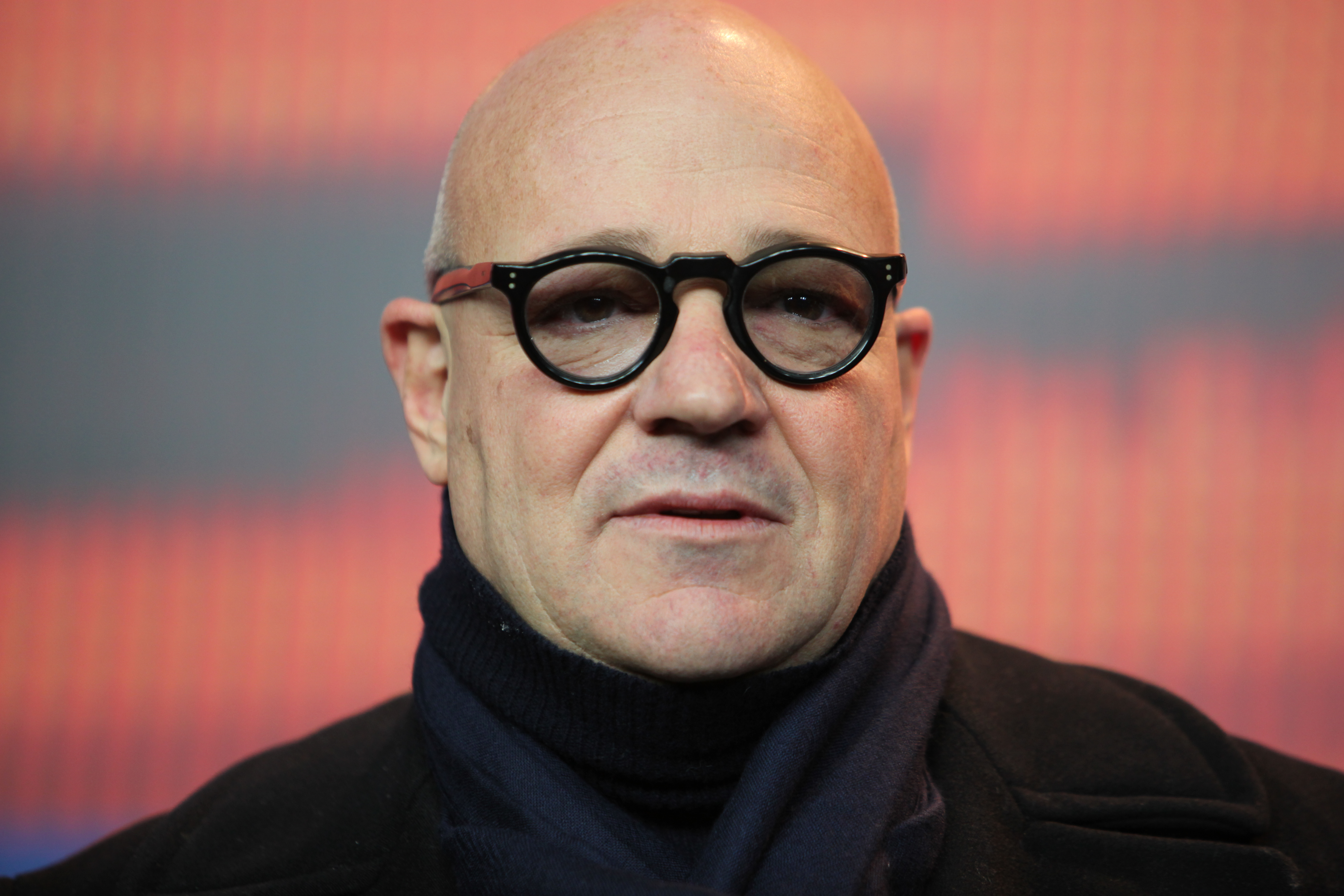
The Golden Bear of 2016 was awarded to Fire at Sea by Italian director Gianfranco Rosi.

The following prizes were awarded:

=== Main Competition ===
- Golden Bear: Fire at Sea by Gianfranco Rosi
- Silver Bear Grand Jury Prize: Death in Sarajevo by Danis Tanović
- Alfred Bauer Prize: A Lullaby to the Sorrowful Mystery by Lav Diaz
- Silver Bear for Best Director: Mia Hansen-Løve for Things to Come
- Silver Bear for Best Actress: Trine Dyrholm for The Commune
- Silver Bear for Best Actor: Majd Mastoura for Hedi
- Silver Bear for Best Script: Tomasz Wasilewski for United States of Love
- Silver Bear for Outstanding Artistic Contribution: Mark Lee Ping Bin for Crosscurrent (Cinematography)

=== Honorary Golden Bear ===
- Michael Ballhaus

=== Best First Feature Award ===
- Mohamed Ben Attia for Hedi

=== Short Film Competition ===
- Golden Bear For Best Short Film: Batrachian's Ballad by Leonor Teles
- Silver Bear Jury Prize: A Man Returned by Mahdi Fleifel
- Audi Short Film Award: Anchorage Prohibited by Chiang Wei Liang

=== Panorama ===
- Panorama Audience Award:
  - 1st Place: Junction 48 by Udi Aloni
  - 2nd Place: Greetings from Fukushima by Doris Dörrie
  - 3rd Place: Shepherds and Butchers by Oliver Schmitz
- Panorama Audience Award – Documentaries:
  - 1st Place: Who's Gonna Love Me Now? by Tomer and Barak Heymann
  - 2nd Place: Strike a Pose by Reijer Zwaan and Ester Gold
  - 3rd Place: Weekends by Lee Dong-ha

=== Teddy Award ===
- Best Feature Film: Tomcat by Klaus Händl
- Best Documentary/Essay Film: Kiki by Sara Jordenö
- Best Short Film: Moms On Fire by Joanna Rytel
- Special Jury Award: You'll Never Be Alone by Alex Anwandter
- Special Teddy Award: Christine Vachon
- Teddy Audience Award: Paris 05:59 by Jacques Martineau and Olivier Ducastel
- Männer Magazine Readers' Jury Award: Don't Call Me Son by Anna Muylaert

== Independent Awards ==
=== FIPRESCI Prize ===
- Competition: Death in Sarajevo by Danis Tanović
- Panorama: Aloys by Tobias Nölle
- Forum: The Revolution Won't Be Televised by Rama Thiaw

=== Prize of the Ecumenical Jury ===
- Competition: Fire at Sea by Gianfranco Rosi
- Panorama: The First, the Last by Bouli Lanners
- Forum:
  - Barakah Meets Barakah by Mahmoud Sabbagh
  - Those Who Jump by Abou Bakar Sidibé, Estephan Wagner and Moritz Sieber

=== Europa Cinemas Label ===
- The First, the Last by Bouli Lanners

=== Arte International Prize ===
- Alvaro Brechner for Memories from the Cell

=== Eurimages Co-production Development Award ===
- Cinéma De facto and Proton Cinema for Blind Willow, Sleeping Woman
