= Time Was Endless =

2016 film

- Directed by: Sérgio Andrade; Fábio Baldo
- Written by: Sérgio Andrade
- Starring: Anderson Tikuna
- Release date: 13 February 2016 (Berlin)
- Running time: 85 minutes
- Country: Brazil
- Language: Portuguese

Time Was Endless (Portuguese: Antes o tempo não acabava) is a 2016 Brazilian drama film directed by Sérgio Andrade and Fábio Baldo. It was shown in the Panorama section at the 66th Berlin International Film Festival.

== Cast ==
- Anderson Tikuna as Anderson
- Severiano Kedassere as Old Shaman
- Fidelis Baniwa as Tunarê
- Kay Sara as Sister
