= Greetings from Fukushima =

2016 film

- Film poster
- Directed by: Doris Dörrie
- Written by: Doris Dörrie
- Starring: Rosalie Thomass
- Release dates: 13 February 2016 (Berlin); 10 March 2016 (Germany)
- Running time: 104 minutes
- Country: Germany
- Language: German

Greetings from Fukushima (German: Grüße aus Fukushima, also known as Fukushima, mon Amour) is a 2016 German drama film directed by Doris Dörrie. It has been selected to be shown in the Panorama section at the 66th Berlin International Film Festival.

== Cast ==
- Rosalie Thomass as Marie
- Kaori Momoi as Satomi
- Aya Irizuki
- Nami Kamata as Nami
- Naomi Kamara
- Moshe Cohen as Moshe
- Thomas Lettow as Jonas
