= Shepherds and Butchers =

2016 film

- Film poster
- Directed by: Oliver Schmitz
- Screenplay by: Brian Cox
- Based on: Shepherds & Butchers by Chris Marnewick
- Produced by: Anant Singh; Brian Cox
- Starring: Steve Coogan; Andrea Riseborough; Garion Dowds
- Cinematography: Leah Striker
- Edited by: Megan Gill
- Music by: Paul Hepker
- Release date: 13 February 2016 (Berlin)
- Running time: 103 minutes
- Country: South Africa
- Language: English

Shepherds and Butchers is a 2016 South African drama film directed by Oliver Schmitz. It was shown in the Panorama section at the 66th Berlin International Film Festival. It is an adaptation of the debut novel of the same name by Chris Marnewick, a New Zealand-based author and former South African High Court barrister and judge.

== Plot ==
Nearing the end of apartheid in South Africa, a young white prison guard (Garion Dowds) embarks on a seemingly motiveless shooting that sees to the death of seven unarmed black sportsmen. A British-born lawyer assigned to his case (Steve Coogan) sets out to prove his actions were a direct result of psychological trauma from his volatile work environment. The defense attorney is an ardent opponent of the death penalty.

== Cast ==
- Steve Coogan as John Weber - Defence attorney
- Andrea Riseborough as Kathleen Marais - Prosecutor
- Garion Dowds as Leon Labuschagne - Defendant
- Deon Lotz as Warrant Officer Rautenbach - Prison officer
- Marcel van Heerden as Justice J. P. van Zyl - Chief Judge
- Robert Hobbs as Pierre De Villiers - John's Brother-in-law

== Awards ==
The film received third place in the Panorama Audience Award at the 66th Berlin International Film Festival.
