= Don't Call Me Son =

2016 film

- Film poster
- Directed by: Anna Muylaert
- Written by: Anna Muylaert
- Starring: Naomi Nero
- Release dates: 12 February 2016 (Berlin); 21 July 2016 (Brazil)
- Running time: 82 minutes
- Country: Brazil
- Language: Portuguese
- Box office: $188,563

Don't Call Me Son (Portuguese: Mãe só há uma) is a 2016 Brazilian drama film directed by Anna Muylaert. It was shown in the Panorama section at the 66th Berlin International Film Festival. where it won a Jury Prize at the Teddy Awards for LGBT-related films at the festival. It was also thrice nominated for the 2017 Grande Prêmio do Cinema Brasileiro.

The film stars Naomi Nero as Felipe/Pierre, a teenager whose life and sense of self is turned upside down when he learns that the woman who raised him is not his real mother, having instead stolen him from a hospital shortly after he was born.

== Plot ==
Pierre is for the most part a typical middle class Brazilian teenager. He is constantly exploring his gender identity and sexual orientation without much thought or consequence. Pierre lives in a suburb of São Paulo with his adoptive mother and sister in a modest but apparently happy home. His carefree teenage existence is destroyed when he is found by detectives that reveal to him that his real name is Felipe, and that he was stolen from the hospital by the woman he calls his mother.

After DNA testing reveals his true parentage, Felipe/Pierre's custody is given to his birth family, while his "adoptive" mother is sent to prison for stealing not only Pierre but also his sister from another family. Having no alternative and completely in shock, Felipe/Pierre is forced to move in with the upper class, conservative family.

Soon after the teenager moves in and the initial excitement wears off, Pierre's parents start trying to change him to make him fit better in their own lifestyle. Felipe/Pierre's gender-bending ways in specific cause a lot of distress to the father, who is mostly unwilling to accept Felipe/Pierre the way he is. A series of increasingly serious conflicts emerges as their expectations of their missing son seem totally alien to the person Pierre believes he is. In the end, his biological brother, ironically ignored and seemingly invisible to their parents, is the only person that seems to understand him.

== Cast ==
- Naomi Nero as Pierre / Felipe
- Daniel Botelho as Joca
- Daniela Nefussi as Aracy / Glória
- Matheus Nachtergaele as Matheus
- Lais Dias as Jaqueline / Cristina
- Luciana Paes as Tia Yara
- Helena Albergaria as Sueli
