= Luis Camacho (dancer) =

American dancer and choreographer

- Born: Manhattan, New York, U.S.
- Occupations: Dancer; choreographer; recording artist
- Years active: Late 1980s–present
- Career
- Current group: House of Xtravaganza
- Former groups: House of Lamé
- Dances: Voguing; ballroom

Luis Camacho (also known as Luis Xtravaganza or Luis Extravaganza) is an American dancer, choreographer and recording artist. He is best known for his work with Madonna.

== Early life ==
Luis Camacho was born on the Lower East Side of Manhattan to Puerto Rican parents.

Camacho trained in dance at the Fiorello H. LaGuardia High School for Music and Art and the Performing Arts alongside fellow student Jose Gutierez. At night he was a performer in the New York ballroom and dance club scene, leaving the House of Lamé to join the House of Xtravaganza. Their signature house style was voguing, and Camacho and Gutierrez, who had also joined the House of Xtravaganza were frequent performers in the competitions. Camacho took the stage name Xtravaganza as a surname, as did his fellow club performers.

== Collaboration with Madonna ==
In the late 1980s the singer Madonna was looking for talented dancers and was shown a home video of Camacho and Gutierrez voguing at Xtravaganza. They auditioned for her and she put them under contract to perform with her in support of her next album and tour - Blond Ambition. The song and video, "Vogue" from the album I'm Breathless, was inspired by the ballroom scene, and Camacho and Gutierrez choreographed their sections of the video, filmed by David Fincher. Their choreography was nominated for a 1990 MTV Video Music Award for Best Choreography in a Video. Camacho and Gutierrez appeared in the 1990 MTV Video Awards on stage with Madonna for her Marie Antoinette performance. They appeared in a Rock the Vote public service announcement. Camacho and Gutierrez were part of the Blond Ambition tour, which performed across North America, Europe and Asia and they appeared in the documentary film Madonna: Truth or Dare (In bed with Madonna) (1991), which followed the worldwide tour.

After the Blond Ambition tour concluded, Madonna continued to lend support to Camacho and Gutierrez, who performing under the name Jose and Luis, recorded an album, The Queen’s English. Madonna sang background vocals on this record, which was produced by Madonna's label, Maverick. Two other songs, "Do It to the Rhythm" and "You Want to Touch Me" appeared on the 1993 Sire Records sampler New Faces.

== Personal life ==
Camacho struggled with addiction for many years following the success of the Madonna period, as he and many of the dancers from the tour transitioned into the next stage of their career and the death of many friends within the LGBTQ community due to AIDS related illnesses. He has been sober since 2004.

== Film and other work ==
Camacho performed in the film, The Birdcage (1996) and Austin Powers in Goldmember (2002) and continued to work as a dancer and choreographer. He has worked with Tony Bennett, Lisa Lisa and the Cult Jam and Aretha Franklin.

He has choreographed casino shows, including Carnival Cabaret for the Horizon Casino and Resort in Lake Tahoe, California.

Camacho reunited with the male dancers of the Blond Ambition tour in the documentary film Strike a Pose (2016), which chronicled their time working with Madonna and subsequent careers. He and Jose Gutierrez were Celebrity Grand Marshals of the San Francisco Gay Pride Parade in 2018. Camacho continues to teach dance in the Los Angeles area.
