= Aloys (film) =

2016 film

- Film poster
- Directed by: Tobias Nölle
- Written by: Tobias Nölle
- Starring: Georg Friedrich
- Release dates: 13 February 2016 (Berlin); 31 March 2016 (Switzerland)
- Country: Switzerland
- Language: Swiss German

Aloys is a 2016 Swiss drama film directed by Tobias Nölle. It was shown in the Panorama section at the 66th Berlin International Film Festival.

== Plot ==
Aloys Adorn is a cold, distant private investigator who worked with his recently deceased father. He never takes a personal approach, instead choosing to film his subjects from a distance with his video camera. Aloys loathes personal contact with others, ignoring various residents of his apartment, and especially the woman next door, who has tried to ask him for assistance several times.

On the bus ride home from the funeral, a depressed Aloys drinks himself to unconsciousness. When he wakes up the next morning in the bus, he finds his camera and the tapes of his subjects are all missing.

A short time later a female voice calls him on the telephone, telling him that she stole his tapes, watched them, and plans to send them to the filmed subjects. Aloys threatens to call the police, but it proves an empty threat, instead using his skills to attempt to identify the caller via the clues. But the caller is always one step ahead of him, mocking his attempts.

During one call, the female voice, in return for the tapes, asks Aloys to perform a "telephone hike", where both callers concentrate on visualizing a shared location and imagine conversing in their imagined locale. After hesitating, Aloys complies, going on an imagined walk through the woods together with the woman.

When he tries to initiate further telephone hikes, the woman abruptly and angrily ends the conversation. Returning home one night, he finds his unconscious neighbor being loaded into an ambulance. Using some of the clues that he obtained while trying to unmask the caller, he realizes that his neighbor, Vera, the same one he ignored earlier, is the mysterious woman.

He learns Vera is a zookeeper who kept exotic animals, lost her job after kidnapping a sheep, and attempted suicide. Not knowing whether she survived, he volunteers to water her flowers and feed her pet iguana.

Days later, a hospitalized Vera texts Aloys thanking him for looking after her stuff. Aloys, elated, now tries to initiate the hikes. Vera hesitatingly gives in and both have repeated telephone hikes, with Aloys inviting her to a tour of his apartment to host a virtual party with all the people Aloys has watched or encountered in his investigations, and eventually, physically traveling to his favorite restaurant to have an imagined dinner with Vera, and visiting the zoo Vera worked at, with Vera giving him a tour through the phone.

One day, however, the real Vera, on leave from the hospital, attempts to visit Aloys at his apartment. He does not let her in, entranced by his imagined version of her, and afraid of human contact once more. A dejected Vera leaves and returns to the hospital. The shock of seeing the real Vera leave prompts Aloys into overcoming his fears, and he follows Vera to the hospital, sneaking into her room in the night and sleeping on the ground next to her bed.

== Cast ==
- Georg Friedrich as Aloys Adorn
- Tilde von Overbeck as Vera
- Kamil Krejcí as Herr Schoch
- Yufei Li as Yen Lee
- Koi Lee as Herr Lee
- Sebastian Krähenbühl as Hauswart
- Karl Friedrich as Vater Aloys
