= Rosalie Thomass =

German actress

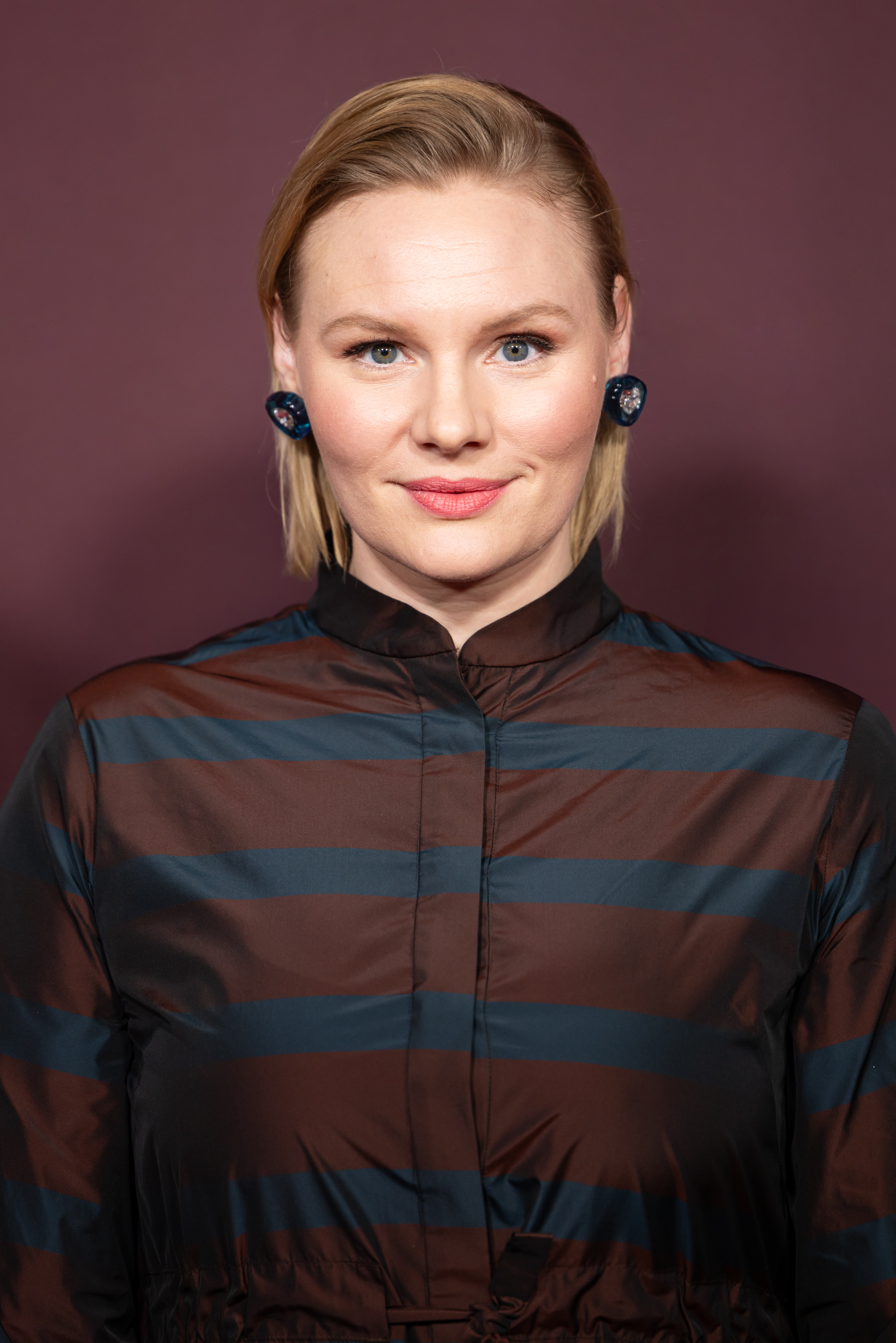
Rosalie Thomass (2025)

Rosalie Thomass (born 14 August 1987 in Munich) is a German actress. She has appeared in several television shows and films.

== Filmography ==
- 2007: Good Times
- 2008: The Best Place to Be
- 2011: Hot Line
- 2012: Mom's Gotta Go (TV film)
- 2012: Death of a Cop (TV film)
- 2014: The Witness House (TV film)
- 2015: Taxi
- 2015: The Dog Wedding
- 2016: Greetings from Fukushima
- 2016: The Unheard Woman
- 2017: Lobbyistin (TV series)
- 2018: Defamed (TV film)
- 2019: A Very Hot Number 2.0
- 2020: The Kangaroo Chronicles
- 2020: Jackpot (TV film)
- 2022: Hunting Season
- 2022: The Kangaroo Conspiracy
- 2022: The Grump: In Search of an Escort
- 2022: What You Can See from Here
- 2024: The Heartbreak Agency
