= Oliver Schmitz =

South African film director

- Born: 1960 (age 65–66); Cape Town, South Africa
- Citizenship: South African
- Occupations: Film director, screenwriter
- Years active: 1988-present
- Notable work: Hijack Stories; Mapantsula

Oliver Schmitz (born 1960) is a South African film director and screenwriter.

His film Mapantsula was screened in the Un Certain Regard section at the 1988 Cannes Film Festival. His 2010 film Life, Above All was also screened in the Un Certain Regard section at the 2010 Cannes Film Festival and it was selected as the South African entry for the Best Foreign Language Film at the 83rd Academy Awards. It made the shortlist of nominations announced in January 2011.

== Selected filmography ==
- Mapantsula (1988)
- Hijack Stories (2000)
- Paris, je t'aime (2006)
- General Dad (2007)
- Deadly Harvest (2008)
- Life, Above All (2010)
- Shepherds and Butchers (2016)

== Awards ==
- Black Reel Awards 2012 Nominated
- Black Reel Outstanding Foreign Film
- Dubai International Film Festival 2010 Won
- Durban International Film Festival 2010 Won Best South African Film
- Muhr AsiaAfrica Special Jury Prize Feature Oliver Schmitz Nominated
- Muhr AsiaAfrica Award, Best Film - Feature Oliver Schmitz
- Image Awards 2012 Nominated Image Award Outstanding Foreign Motion Picture
- Leo Awards 2011 Won Leo Best Screenwriting in a Feature Length DramaDennis Foon
- National Board of Review, USA 2010 Won NBR Award Top Five Foreign Films
