= Strike a Pose =

2016 film by Ester Gould, Reijer Zwaan

- Film poster
- Directed by: Ester Gould; Reijer Zwaan
- Distributed by: CTM Docs
- Release date: 15 February 2016 (Berlin)
- Running time: 83 minutes
- Countries: Belgium; Netherlands
- Language: English

Strike a Pose is a Belgian-Dutch documentary film, which premiered in the Panorama section of the 2016 Berlinale. Directed by Ester Gould and Reijer Zwaan, the film profiles the dancers who performed with Madonna on her Blond Ambition World Tour in 1990.

== Story ==
The film follows the dancers during the 25 years since the tour. Some went on to act in film, TV and stage, and all of them kept dance in their lives. Some had to deal with AIDS, drug use and homelessness. The six who appear in the film are Kevin Stea, Carlton Wilborn, Luis Xtravaganza Camacho, Jose Gutierez Xtravaganza, Salim Gauwloos and Oliver S Crumes III. One of the original seven, Gabriel Trupin, died from complications due to AIDS in 1995 and is represented in the film by his mother, Sue Trupin.

Strike a Pose includes information about dancers Gabriel Trupin, Salim “ Slam” Gauwloos and Carlton Wilborn's positive HIV status, and why they decided not to share information about their status, even with each other, during the Blond Ambition tour.

== Production ==
The film was partially financed by the International Documentary Film Festival Forum Award, Amsterdam, and was produced by CTM Docs and The Other Room in coproduction with Serendipity Films and NTR. The film premiered at the 2016 Berlin International Film Festival where it received the second place Panorama audience award for a documentary.

Gauwloos shared his HIV-positive status publicly for the first time during filming for Strike a Pose.

Gould said in an interview that she specifically did not want Madonna to be a part of the film, because she might pull focus from the dancers' stories. "In a strange way, she was the elephant in the room, because even if she had turned up at the reunion dinner, wouldn’t that somehow ruin the point that these young dancers have moved on, matured and become grown men?" Gould said she was unsure if Madonna had seen the film or liked it.

== Reviews ==
Reviews of the documentary were mixed. The film has earned 96% on Rotten Tomatoes, and 59% on Metacritic

For Variety, Denis Harvey wrote, “By the time we see them playing “truth or dare” anew over dinner, 'Strike a Pose' begins to feel like a rather flimsy, gimmicky exploitation rather than a thoughtful exploration of a shared, shining-moment-in-the-spotlight past.” For The Guardian, Peter Bradshaw wrote, “in emotionally effusive film, this – sometimes excitable and indulgent but watchable, and an interesting addition to a growing documentary genre focusing on New York City as the crucible of gay liberation politics.”

== Awards and nominations ==
- Best LGBT Film - Key West Film Festival
- Best Queer Film of the Year 2016 - Merlinka festival
- Nominated for Golden Athena - Athens International Film Festival
- Nominated for Audience Award - Hot Docs Canadian International Documentary Festival
- Nominated for Audience Award - Berlin International Film Festival
