= Freddy DeMann =

Film producer and music executive

- Occupations: film producer, music executive

Frederick DeMann is a film producer, music executive, and co-founder of Maverick Records.

During his music career, he managed Michael Jackson, Madonna and Shakira. During DeMann's tenure, Michael Jackson's albums Off the Wall and Thriller were recorded and released. DeMann managed Madonna from 1983 through 1997. He is also the former manager of Lionel Richie and Billy Idol, among others. After selling his interest in Maverick in 1999, he managed Shakira.

As a producer, he bought the rights to the book The Life and Death of Peter Sellers and turned it into a movie for HBO, which earned nine Emmy Awards and two Golden Globe Awards.

Broadway productions include Proof, Topdog/Underdog, Take Me Out, Dear Evan Hansen and Spring Awakening; each play won the Tony Award, Pulitzer Prize, or both. Also: West Side Story, and A Chorus Line.
