= Serginho (footballer, born 2001) =

Cape Verdean footballer (born 2001)

Personal information
- Full name: Sérgio Pereira Andrade
- Date of birth: 29 January 2001 (age 25)
- Place of birth: Lisbon, Portugal
- Height: 1.83 m (6 ft 0 in)
- Position: Winger

Team information
- Current team: Al Wasl
- Number: 19

Youth career
- 2011–2012: Belenenses
- 2012–2015: Sacavenense
- 2015–2017: Benfica
- 2017–2019: Belenenses
- 2019–2020: Benfica
- 2020–2022: Estoril

Senior career*
Years	Team	Apps	(Gls)
2022–2023	Estoril	7	(1)
2023	→ Oliveirense (loan)	15	(2)
2023–2025	Viborg	56	(7)
2025–	Al Wasl	29	(6)

International career^{‡}
2023	Cape Verde	1	(0)
- * Club domestic league appearances and goals as of 19:21, 5 September 2026 (UTC) ‡ National team caps and goals as of 17 October 2023

Sérgio Pereira Andrade (born 29 January 2001), known as Serginho, is a professional footballer who plays as a winger for UAE Pro League club Al Wasl. Born in Portugal, he has represented the Cape Verde national team.

== Club career ==
Serginho is a youth product of the academies of Belenenses, Sacavenense, and Benfica. Beginning his career with the Benfica U23s for the first half of the 2020–21 season, he moved to Estoril's that winter. He signed his first professional contract with Estoril on 19 July 2022, keeping him at the club until 2025.

Serginho made his professional and Primeira Liga debut as a late starter in a 2–2 tie with Rio Ave on 19 August 2022.

On 31 July 2023, Danish Superliga side Viborg announced the signing of Serginho on a three-year deal, for a reported fee of €500.000.

Serginho was sold to UAE Pro League club Al Wasl on 4 August 2025.

== International career ==
Born in Portugal, Serginho is of Cape Verdean descent through his parents. In October 2023, he received his first call-up for the Cape Verde national team, and made his international debut in a friendly against Comoros on 17 October.

== Honours ==
Individual

- Liga Portugal 2 Goal of the Month: April 2023
- Danish Superliga Team of the Year: 2024–25
