= Amine Al Ghozzi =

French-Tunisian writer

Amine Ben Aissa (born 1980) is a Tunisian-French writer. He goes by the pen name of Amine Al Ghozzi. Al Ghozzi went to university in Tunisia, and became a school teacher. He is currently pursuing a Master's degree at the Sorbonne.

As a writer, Al Ghozzi writes in both standard Arabic and Tunisian Arabic dialect. His debut novel, Devil’s Shadow Behind my Picture, appeared in 2013. He won the EU Prize for Literature in 2021 for his book ZINDALI, THE NIGHT OF 14 JANUARY 2011.

He has also written poetry and song lyrics, among the latter the lyrics to the famous protest song Kelmti Horra, popularized by Emel Mathlouthi. As a filmmaker, and made two short films in his twenties, The Blackboard (2004) and Crossed Lives (2005).

He lives with his wife and two children in Orléans, France.
