= No Land's Song =

- Theatrical release poster
- Directed by: Ayat Najafi
- Written by: Ayat Najafi
- Produced by: Anne Grange; Gunter Hanfgarn; Rouven Rech; Teresa Renn
- Starring: Sara Najafi; Parvin Namazi; Sayeh Sodeyfi; Elise Caron; Jeanne Cherhal; Emel Mathlouthi
- Release date: 28 August 2014 (Montreal)
- Running time: 91 minutes
- Countries: Germany; France; Iran
- Languages: Persian; English; French

No Land's Song (Persian: آواز بی‌سرزمین / Âvâz-e Bi-Sarzamin) is a 2014 Iranian documentary film written and directed by Ayat Najafi, starring Sara Najafi, Parvin Namazi, Sayeh Sodeyfi, Emel Mathlouthi, Elise Caron, and Jeanne Cherhal.

== Synopsis ==
In the wake of the revolution of 1979, the new regime forbids women in Iran to sing publicly as soloists in front of men. (Note: "Since 1979, Iran has banned women from singing solo in public. The year marked the beginning of the Islamic Revolution and the start of a clampdown on Iranian society. Composer Sara Najafi and her female singer friends are determined to challenge this. They decide to organise a concert in the heart of Iran – its capital Tehran, inviting French and Tunisian female artists to take part. The concert is a celebration of the female voice – something that has been silenced for over 35 years.")

In defiance of censorship and cultural, religious and legal taboos, a young composer named Sara Najafi decides to organize a concert for female solo singers.

Najafi starts to enlist others. She recruits two other Iranian singers – Parvin Namazi and Sayeh Sodeyfi – to join her. In turn, Namazi and Sodeyfi invite three female singers from Paris: Elise Caron, Jeanne Cherhal and Emel Mathlouthi. Their stated intention is to perform together as solo artists in a show to be held in Tehran. As the Iranian film festival states, this musical collaboration is said to reopen a "musical bridge" uniting France and Iran.

The documentary poses the question whether women will ever be successful in singing free, together, side by side, in front of a mixed audience, without restrictions or interference. Success in their immediate quest makes for a compelling drama. On the other hand, the long-term effect is more questionable.

It is said that the movie is an antidote to the misogynist excesses of the government. "The female voice is fading away", Najafi claims.

== Reception ==
No Land's Song has received widespread praise. Some of the reviews:

- The Guardian: An "audacious" film and enterprise. Unfortunately, the respite from official oppression proved temporary — hard liners banned performances by females even as backing singers.
- The Hollywood Reporter: Much more than a 'let's do a show' movie, the reviewer considers it to be enthralling, riveting and empowering, even though its end is not suspenseful. The proffered religious justification for the ban is that female solo singing may be sexually arousing to male audience members, and is akin to putting too many ingredients into the soup. “Ayat Najafi's documentary is about the fight for a woman's right to sing in Iran.”
- Middle East Monitor: Facing endless barriers, the group struggles to its defiant and triumphant conclusion. "Inspired by the memories of ballsy female Iranian singer Qamar-ol-Moluk Vaziri who, in 1924, became the first female to perform without a hijab in front of men, they remain optimistic. ... In the concert she dedicates her solo to the Iranian youth from the Tunisian youth. Instead of a celebration of the female voice, it seems to have become a much more obvious act of rebellion" which conveys their emotion.
- The New York Times: Clearly showing courage in film making and thus deserving the Human Rights Watch International Nestor Almendros award, it is "candid in its views about the Iranian government’s attitudes toward women, it sears its protagonist’s story into the hearts of viewers with a narrative of artistic resistance, humor, friendship, and, ultimately, triumph in a country notorious for denying women’s rights."
- Variety: The film is a "gripping documentary" and "a finely tooled, multi-layered [film]." This "gripping chronicle of her efforts covers a nearly three-year period and is as full of ups and downs as a roller coaster, and bursting with beautiful music. The inspiring, enlightening, audience-friendly pic" should receive commercial as well as cultural success.

== Awards and nominations ==
The film has been widely aired at more than a dozen film festivals, and has been well-received, and was nominated for and garnered many awards.

International Film Festival
Year	Festival	Award	Winner	Result
2014	Montreal World Film Festival	Best documentary	Ayat Najafi	won
2014	Noor Iranian Film Festival	Best documentary director	Ayat Najafi	won
2014	Dok Leipzig	Young Jury Award	Ayat Najafi	won
2014	Gijón International Film Festival	Docufix Best Documentary	Ayat Najafi	won
2015	Middle East Now festival	Audience Award	Ayat Najafi	won
2015	International Film Festival of Human Rights in Paris	Special Jury Fleury Merogis	Ayat Najafi	won
2015	Achtung Berlin	Special Mention Prize Exterminate	Ayat Najafi	won
2015	Kraków Film Festival	Mention spéciale du Jury DocFilmMusic	Ayat Najafi	won
2015	Human Rights Watch Film Festival	Nestor Almendros Price	Ayat Najafi	won
2015	Unabhängiges Filmfest-Osnabrück	Peace Film Award	Ayat Najafi	won
2015	Verzio International Human Rights Film Festival	Audience Award	Ayat Najafi	won
2015	International Folk Music Film Festival – Kathmandu	Best Longer Film Award	Ayat Najafi	won
2015	Bir duino International Documentary Film	Best Film on Women's Rights	Ayat Najafi	won
