= Emel Mathlouthi =

Tunisian singer and producer (born 1982)

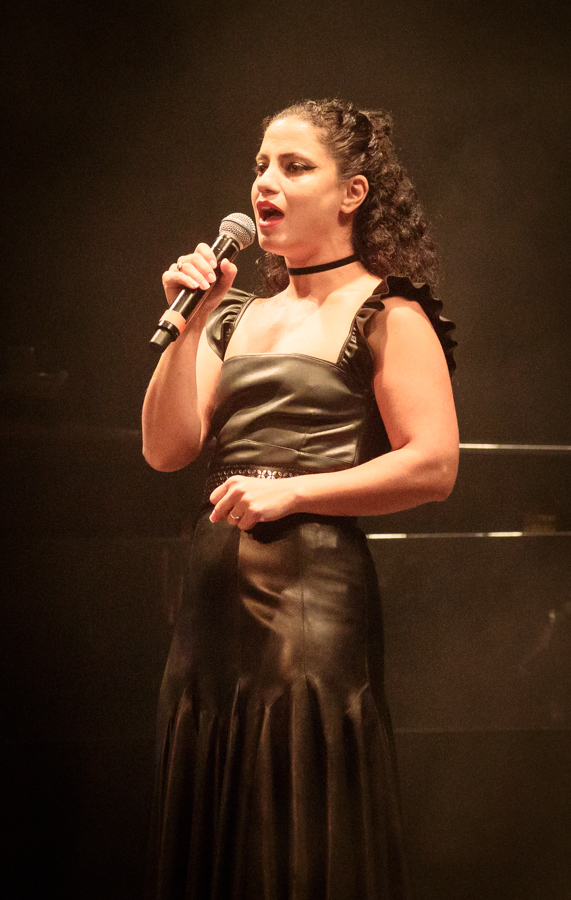
- Emel performing in 2017

Background information
- Also known as: Emel
- Born: 11 January 1982 (age 44); Tunis, Tunisia
- Genres: World music; avant-garde; electronic; experimental; film score
- Occupations: Singer-songwriter; music producer
- Instrument: Guitars
- Years active: 2010–present
- Labels: Partisan; Little Human
- Website: emelmathlouthi.com emel.bandcamp.com

Emel Mathlouthi (Arabic: آمال المثلوثي; born 11 January 1982), also known professionally as Emel, is a Tunisian-American singer-songwriter, musician, arranger and producer. She rose to fame with her protest song "Kelmti Horra" ("My Word is Free"), which became an anthem for the Tunisian revolution and the Arab Spring. Her first studio album, also titled Kelmti Horra, was released worldwide in 2012 to critical acclaim: she combined Arab roots with western influence. Her second album, Ensen, was released in 2017, blending electronica with classical music. On Everywhere We Looked Was Burning in 2019, she sang all the lyrics in English.

In 2020, the video of her song "Holm" ("A Dream") that she sings in Tunisian Arabic had been viewed several million times within a few months. "Holm" was included in the double album The Tunis Diaries which she recorded with just a voice, an acoustic guitar as the sole instrument and a laptop. Holm is an Arabic remake of the Iranian song "Soltane Ghalbhaa" with music composed by Anoushiravan Rohani and original lyrics by Emel Mathlouthi.

She has also collaborated with other musicians such as Tricky, Valgeir Sigurðsson, Steve Moore and Vitalic.

== Early life ==
Emel Mathlouthi began her career in singing and acting at the age of eight in a suburb of her hometown Tunis. She wrote her first song at the age of 10. Encouraged by her entourage and inspired by the popular pop singers of the 1990s, she discovered her strong vocal abilities at 15. A little later, she found an interest in heavy metal and Gothic music, and formed her first metal band at a Tunisian university when she was 19.

A few years later, moved by the voice and ideas of Joan Baez after her bandmate played "The Boxer" for her, Mathlouthi quit the band and began writing political songs, discovering her frustration by the lack of opportunities and the apathy of her compatriots, such as "Ya Tounes Ya Meskina" ("Poor Tunisia"). In 2006 she was a finalist in the Prix RMC Moyen-Orient Musique competition. She decided to move to Paris, France, in 2008 when the Tunisian government banned her songs from radio and TV. Although banned from Tunisian airwaves, bootlegs of her live performances in France circulated on the internet in Tunisia. After the death of Mohamed Bouazizi she dedicated an Arabic version of the Joan Baez song "Here's To You" to him.

== Career ==
In early 2011, she was recorded on the Avenue Habib Bourguiba singing "Kelmti Horra" to protesters and it became a viral video. NPR wrote that the song was a "declaration of independence, a statement of hard-earned liberation". This was part of the Arab Spring protests.

=== Kelmti Horra (My Word is Free) (2012–2016) ===
Emel released her debut, Kelmti Horra, in January 2012. It received critical acclaim. In a four out of five star review, The Guardian praised the album for twisting together Arabic roots with western flavours – some rock but mostly cavernous trip-hop. "The mix works well on stand-outs "Dhalem" and "Ma Ikit", where Mathlouthi's striking vocals find most melody; elsewhere, the understandably serious mood of protest and sadness flatlines somewhat. A powerful new voice, none the less". The album was influenced by Joan Baez, Massive Attack, and Björk. As a politically aware musician, the songs in the album have made promising duty to speak out on any injustice that Emel has witnessed about her beloved Tunisia. While she sings about humanity and a better world, the success of this album has made her to reach many more people in different parts of the world.

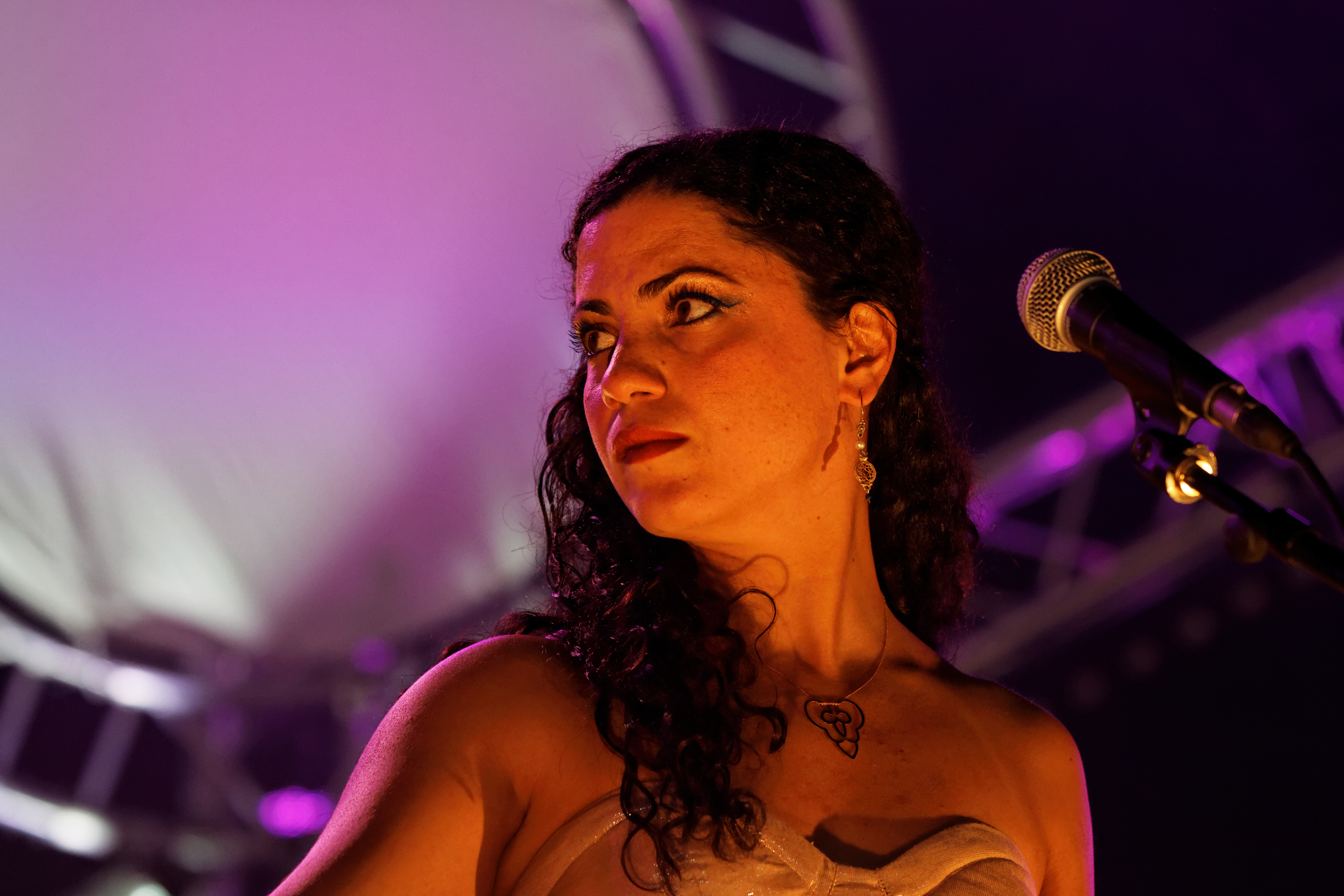
Emel live in August 2012

She gave concerts in Egypt and Iraq, and performed in Canada at the Vancouver Folk Music Festival and the Festival du Monde Arabe de Montréal. At the beginning of July 2012, she gave a groundbreaking concert in Baghdad, Iraq. On 28 July she gave a concert at the Sfinks Festival in Belgium, where she received a standing ovation for her cover of the Leonard Cohen song "Hallelujah". In 2013, after her first concert in Cairo since the revolution, Ahram Online described her as "The Fairuz of her generation". She opened for Dead Can Dance at the festival Les nuits de Fourvière in Lyon and performed at the WOMAD Festival at Charlton Parkin the UK. When Israeli authorities refused to let her enter Ramallah to perform, she sang in front of a camera in Jordan. The small show was broadcast to the Palestinian audience at a theater in Ramallah.

As the song "Kelmti Horra" was considered as "the anthem of the Arab Spring," it has been Emel's most famous song so far. The outstanding success of this song led her to perform it on 11 December 2015, during the award ceremony of the 2015 Nobel Peace Prize in Oslo, which was awarded to the Tunisian National Dialogue Quartet. At the Nobel Peace Prize Ceremony, she performed two renditions of her song "Kelmti Horra," one accompanied only by a guitarist, Karim Attoumane, and the other with a full orchestra and chorus. The concert was hosted by Jay Leno, who praised her in the concert press conference as being the first Arabic-language singer to catch his attention.

During that time, she collaborated with Tricky and provided leading vocals on his song "Emel".

=== Ensen (Human) (2017–2018) ===
Ensen (Human) was released in February 2017 by Partisan Records. The album was recorded in seven countries including Iceland, Sweden, France, and the US. Producers of the album include the former Björk collaborator, Icelandic producer Valgeir Sigurðsson and Emel's main collaborator Franco-Tunisian producer Amine Metani. Pitchfork hailed the first single off the album, "Ensen Dhaif" (Human, Helpless Human), as "a gorgeously ornamented fusion of towering beats and darkly-shaded Arabic minor scales. Its incendiary tone is conducted by Mathlouthi's galvanic voice, which is at turns vulnerable and strong. On "Ensen Dhaif" you hear a person refusing to compromise, a searing vision founded on real risks and the necessity of truth". As Mathlouthi explained the song was dedicated to the "people that have to carry the weight and all the struggles so that a very small percentage can enjoy the power."

The songs of Ensen were then entirely reworked on the remix album Ensenity. Nine different producers from different backgrounds were invited to accentuate the electronica side of the tracks.

=== Everywhere We Looked Was Burning (2019) ===
In 2019, she released her first all-English album Everywhere We Looked Was Burning, she wanted "to write about nature as well as the beauty and struggle of these times". She was inspired by the "essential imagery" of US poets such T.S. Eliot and John Ashbury. At that time, she he had been living in the New-York area for a few years. New York Times reviewed it saying; "As she sings about a mysterious experience, the sustained, modal melody and stretches of drone harmony hint at North African and Arab underpinnings, while its electric and electronic instruments pulse and hover in virtual space, maintaining the enigma". Brooklyn Vegan wrote that "these really are some of her most breathtaking songs yet". Everywhere We Looked Was Burning was produced in part with Steve Moore.

That year, Emel also sang on Moore's Beloved Exile EP. AllMusic reviewed her performance saying, "opener "Your Sentries Will Be Met with Force" features the enchanting vocals of Tunisian singer Emel Mathlouthi, who adds a sublime new dimension to Moore's glowing, pulsating electronics".

In 2017 she returned to Tunisia for her first concert there in five years, headlining the prestigious Carthage Festival. That summer she also performed at the Beitaddine Festival in Lebanon, and the SummerStage festival in Central Park, New York City.

=== The Tunis Diaries (2020–2023) ===
While being on vacation in her childhood home in Tunis in 2020, she recorded a double album The Tunis Diaries on her own, with just an acoustic guitar and her voice. She hadn't played on an acoustic guitar in a long time. The Tunis Diaries is split in two parts "Day" and "Night". The first disc includes Emel songs revisited sung in part English, and in Tunisian plus an unreleased song "Holm" which has been viewed more than 3.5 million times on YouTube as of January 2021. The second disc features several covers of Leonard Cohen, David Bowie and Jeff Buckley. While promoting the album in Paris, she recorded a rendition of a Siouxsie and the Banshees song as a one-off for French Television.

In 2021, she released Everywhere We Looked Was Burning Live which was a live version of her 2019's album. In September, she collaborated with electronic music producer Vitalic for a one-off concert in Paris which took place at Théâtre du Châtelet: they created together a new music around the poetry of Ghada Al-Samman for an event called Variations. The show was filmed for Culturebox channel and uploaded on YouTube.

Her debut album Kelmti Horra was released for the first time on vinyl in 2022 to celebrate its 10-year anniversary.

In 2023, she collaborated with the filmmaker Shirin Neshat for a video titled the Fury, about "the sexual exploitation of female political prisoners by the Islamic Republic’s regime in Iran". Neshat had selected a Persian song for which Emel wrote Arabic lyrics.

=== Mra (2024–present) ===
Issued in April 2024, Mra (which means woman) included the singles "Nar" and "Souty (My Voice)". Mra was conceived with a completely female team of musicians, singers and producers which was a first experience for her.

== Influences ==
Mathlouthi lists her early musical influences as Joan Baez, Bob Dylan, Marcel Khalife and Sheikh Imam. Her other musical influences include Janis Joplin, Sinéad O'Connor, Led Zeppelin, James Blake, Roger Waters and Fuck Buttons.

== Style ==
Mathlouthi's singular style is a mix of North African sounds and modern electronic production.

== Cinema ==
Mathlouthi was featured in the 2014 documentary No Land's Song by Ayat Najafi and she became the first female soloist to perform in Iran since 1979. Several films have used her music in their soundtracks.

== Fashion ==
Mathlouthi collaborates frequently with established and emerging designers for her stagewear, including Manish Arora, Jean Paul Gaultier and Ahmed Talfit, but most frequently with her compatriot Azzedine Alaia.

== Discography ==
Studio albums

- Kelmti Horra (2012)
- Ensen (2017)
- Everywhere We Looked Was Burning (2019)
- The Tunis Diaries (2020)
- Mra (2024)

Remix album

- Ensenity (2018)

Live album

- Everywhere We Looked Was Burning (Live) (2021)

Contributing artist

- The Rough Guide to Arabic Revolution (World Music Network) (2013)
- Now Indie Arabia (Universal Music Group) (2016)
- Philia: Artists Rise Against Islamophobia (Floating House Recordings) (2017)
