= Wieland Speck =

German film director

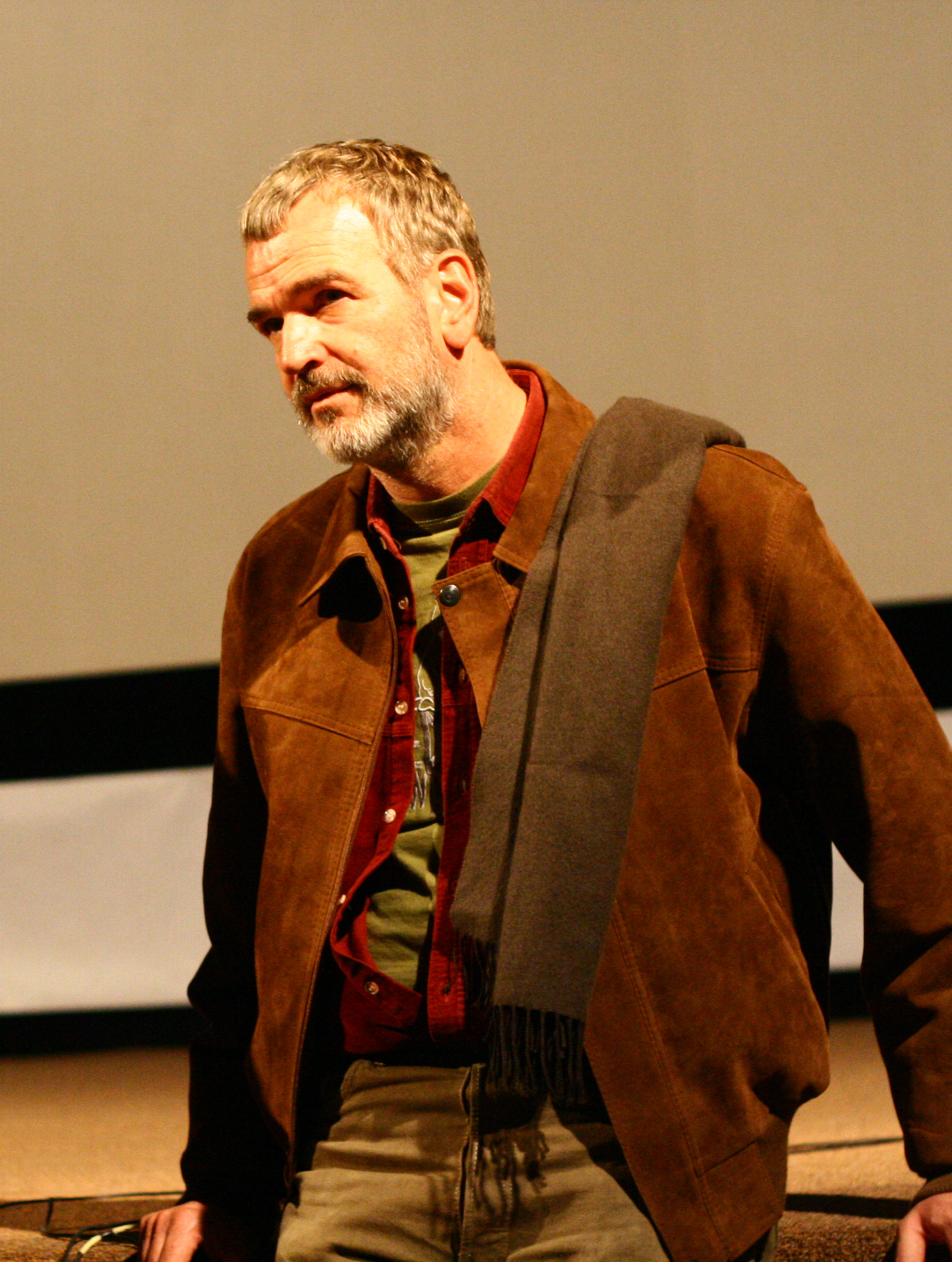
- Wieland Speck in 2006
- Born: 1951 (age 74–75); Freiburg im Breisgau, Baden-Württemberg, Germany.
- Occupations: Actor, director, author and publisher
- Years active: 1990–present

Wieland Speck (born 1951 in Freiburg im Breisgau) is a German film director, who since 1992 has coordinated "Panorama" at the International Filmfestival Berlin (Berlinale). Panorama showcases new films by established directors, as well as debut works by up-and-coming talents.

== Biography ==
Since 1972, he started living in Berlin. He studied German, Theater and Ethnology at the Free University of Berlin. Since the mid-1970s, Speck has been engaged in various areas of film and video as well as author and publisher.

In the late 1970s, he was managing director of the Tali-Kino, an independent arthouse cinema in Berlin-Kreuzberg (later called "Moviemento"). From 1979 to 1981 he completed a film study at the San Francisco Art Institute.

Between 1982 and 1992 Speck worked with the German film director Manfred Salzgeber producing LGBT-themed films and shorts. He is the co-creator of the Teddy Award, (with Manfred Salzgeber) which since 1987 was awarded to LGBT films at the Berlinale.

Openly gay, he has lived in Berlin since 1972. Speck studied German, theater and ethnology at the Freie Universität Berlin.

In 1985, he produced his first feature film Westler.

He was a panel member of the Berlin State Film Fund (1990–1993) and the Hamburg Film Fund (1994–1998) and from 1992 to 2017 he was head of the Panorama section of the Berlinale.

In 2011 he won the Nino Gennaro Award at the first edition of Sicilia Queer filmfest.

In 2015, Speck won the 20th Busan International Film Festival, Korean Cinema Award.

In 2017, he became a consultant on the Berlinale official program.

== Filmography ==
As an actor;

Year	Title	Character	Notes
1978	Just a Gigolo	Man	Uncredited
1980	How to Choose a Wife	Cowboy	(Short)
1982	Rote Liebe – Wassilissa	Spekulant auf der Party	
1987	Kismet, Kismet		
1988	The Venus Trap		
1988	Sleepless Nights	Schauspieler	
1989	The Prisoner of St. Petersburg	Youth in bar	
1992	The True Story About Men and Women		
2012	Mommy is Coming	Hans Eberhardt	

As a Director;

Year	Film	Other notes
2000	Escape to Life: The Erika and Klaus Mann Story	(Director, Screenplay)
1991	Among Men	
1991	Zimmer 303	(Short)
1989	November	(Short)
1985	Westler	(director, screenplay, production)
1983	The Sound of Fast Relief	(Short) (director, screenwriter, camera, editor)
1981	Bei uns zuhaus – Chez nous	(Short)
1981	David, Montgomery und ich	(Short) (director, screenplay, camera, editor)

== Awards ==
- 2010: Federal Cross of Merit
- 2011: Nino Gennaro Award ( Sicilia Queer filmfest )
- 2019: Berlinale Camera
