= Teddy Award =

LGBT film award of the Berlin International Film Festival

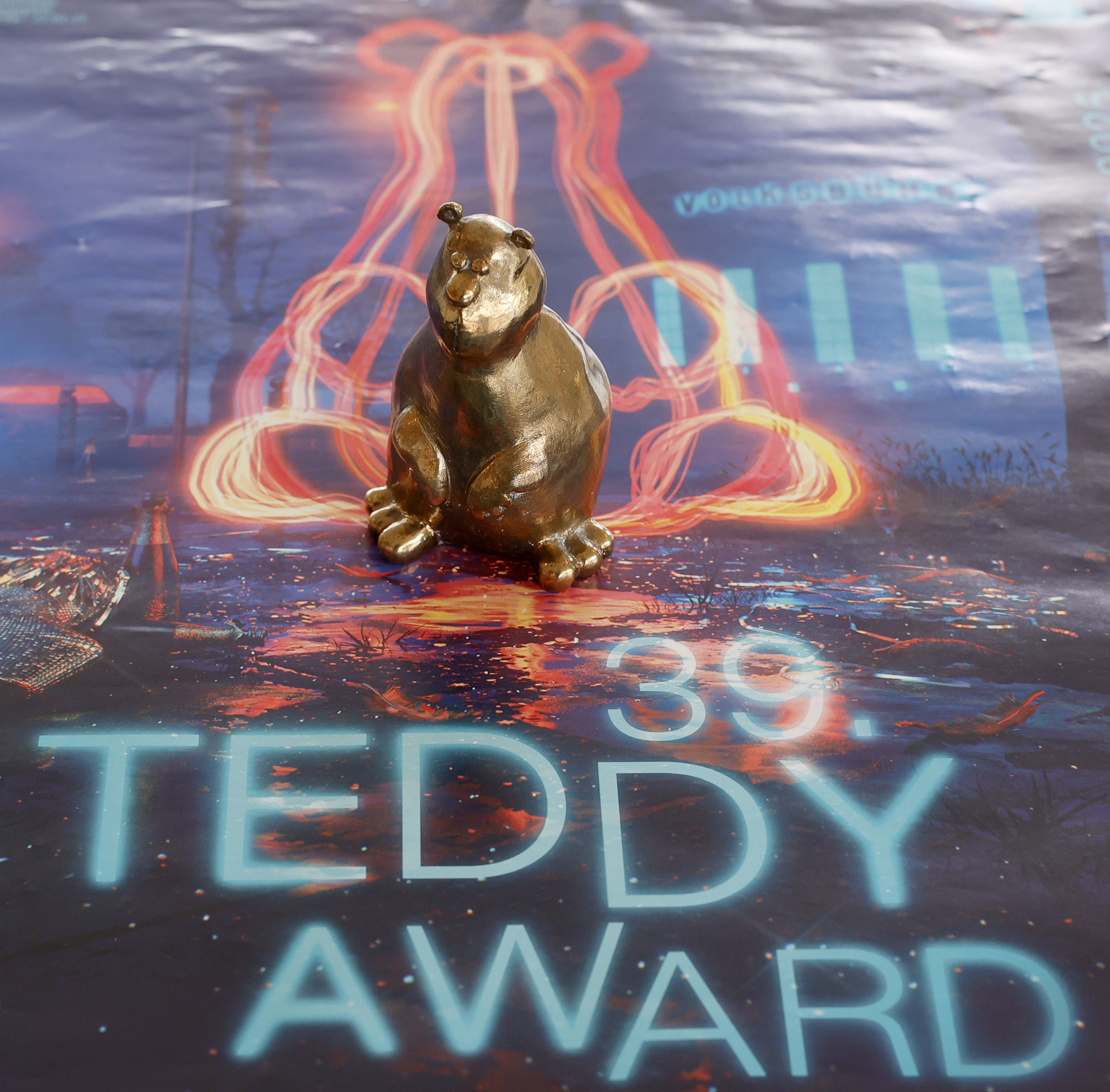
- Teddy Award (2025)
- Awarded for: Best LGBT-related film
- Country: Germany
- Presented by: Berlin International Film Festival
- First award: 1987; 39 years ago
- Website: www.teddyaward.tv

The Teddy Award is an international film award for films with LGBTQIA+ topics, presented by an independent jury as an official award of the Berlin International Film Festival (the Berlinale). For the most part, the jury consists of organisers of gay and lesbian film festivals, who view films screened in all sections of the Berlinale; films do not have to have been part of the festival's official competition stream to be eligible for Teddy awards. Subsequently, a list of films meeting criteria for LGBT content is selected by the jury, and a 3,000-Euro Teddy is awarded to a feature film, a short film and a documentary.

At the 66th Berlin International Film Festival in 2016, a dedicated "Teddy30" lineup of classic LGBT-related films was screened as a full program of the festival to celebrate the award's 30th anniversary.

== History ==
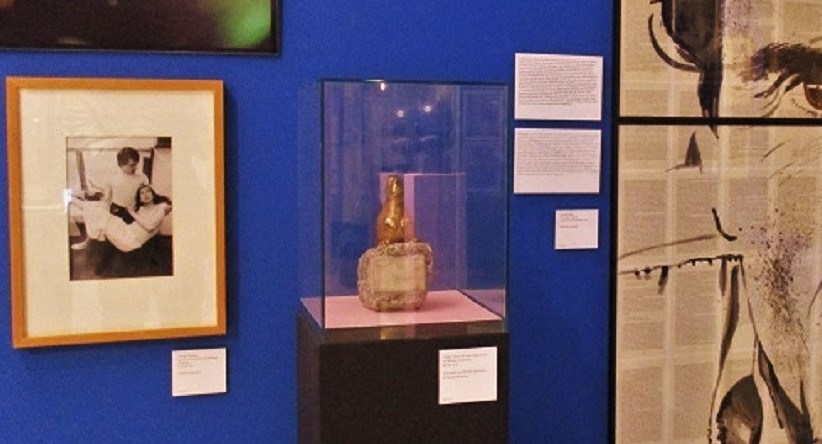
The Teddy Award statue located in the Schwules Museum

In 1987 German filmmakers Wieland Speck and Manfred Salzgeber formed a jury called the International Gay & Lesbian Film Festival Association (IGLFFA) to create an award for LGBT films. It was originally named the Teddy Bear Award, in accordance with the Berlinale's main awards being named as the Golden and Silver Bear; the name was later shortened to Teddy Award, although the statuette presented to winners is still shaped like a teddy bear.

The first Teddy Award was given to Pedro Almodóvar for his film La ley del deseo, which featured Antonio Banderas.

The awards were originally founded in a gay bookshop in West Berlin, they were named after the cuddly toys which were sent as prizes to the winners. They were then upgraded to metal trophies but are still thought to be a deliberate parody of the main Berlin Film Festival’s Golden Bear trophy.

1990 was the first bigger festival in the LGBT centrum SchwuZ in Berlin with around 400 guests. The evening was organized from BeV StroganoV and workers of the bookstore Eisenherz in Berlin. In 1992 the award was officially made part of the Berlin International Film Festival. In 1997 TEDDY e.V., a non-profit organisation was founded, which lobbied the award.

== Winners ==
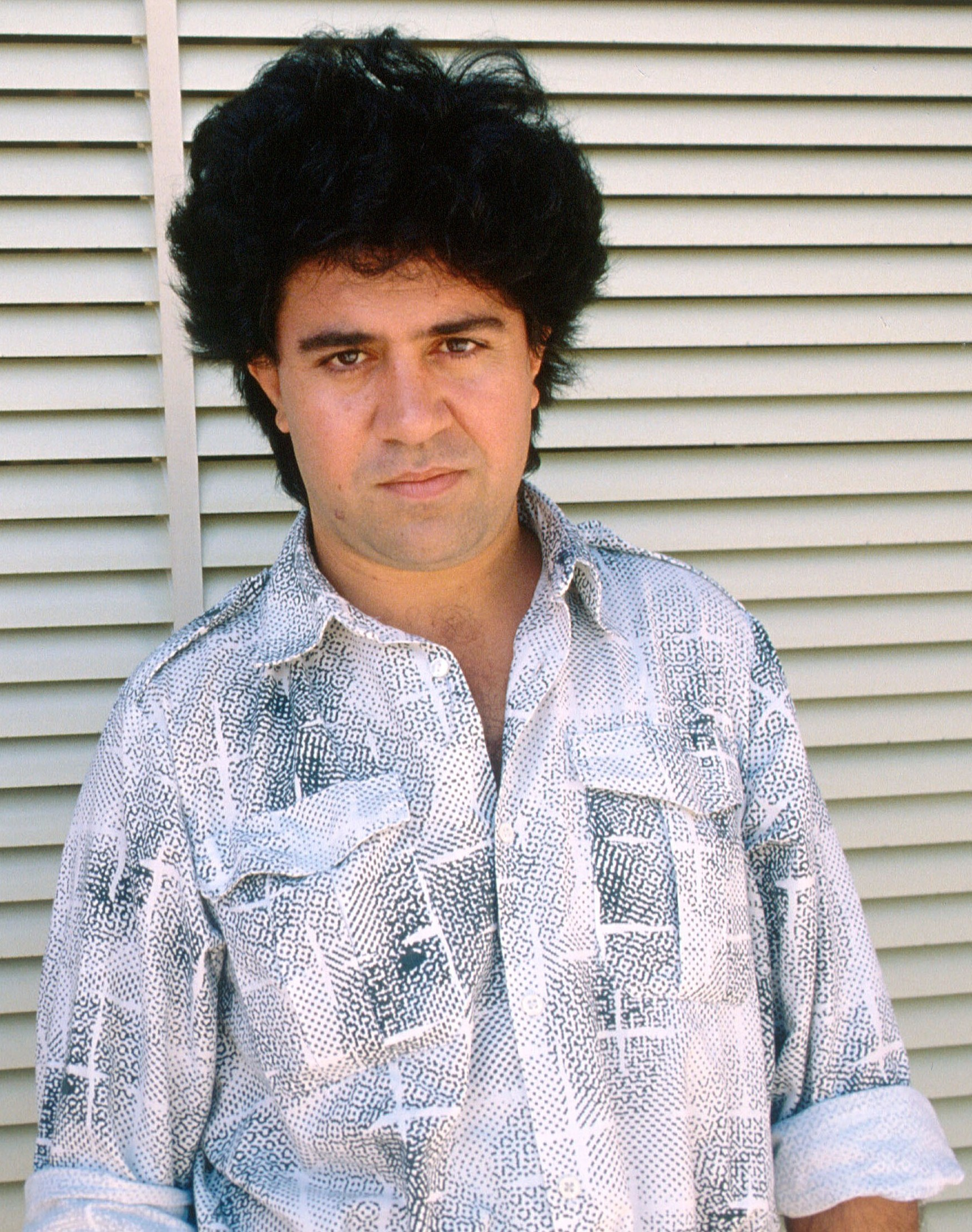
Pedro Almodóvar won Best Feature Film at the inaugural ceremony in 1987 for Law of Desire.

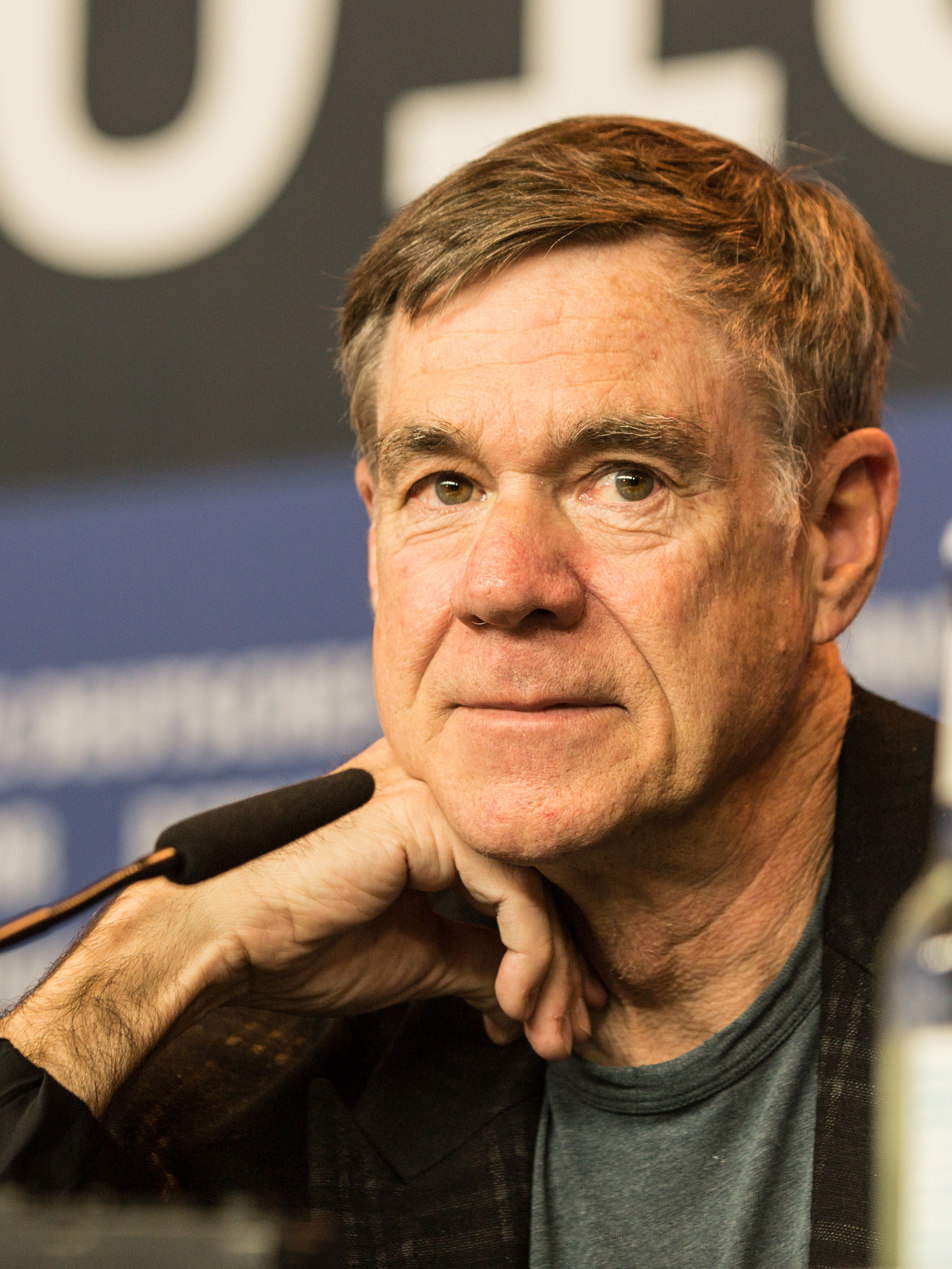
Two short films directed by Gus Van Sant, My New Friend and Five Ways to Kill Yourself, won the first Best Short Film award in 1987.

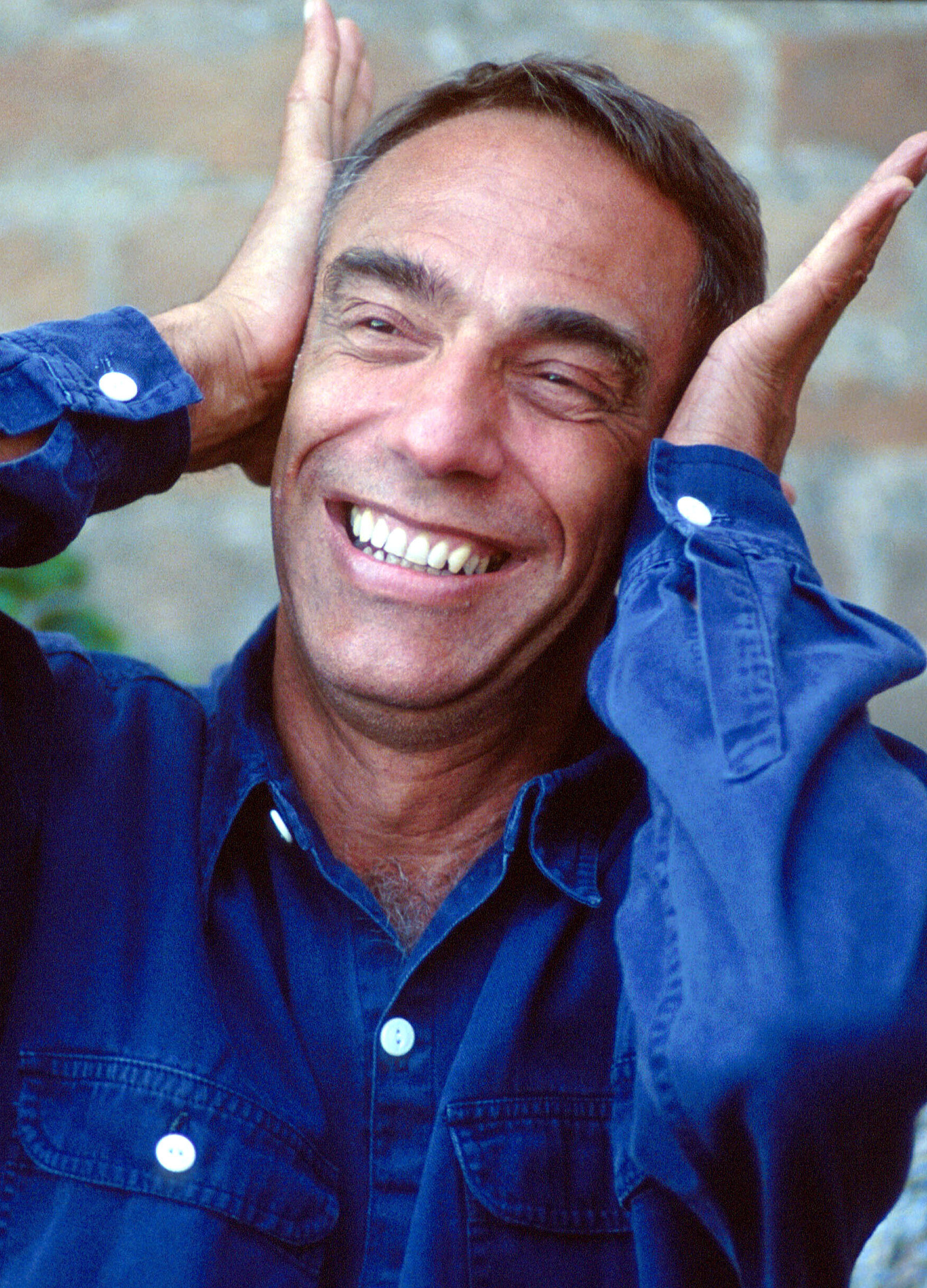
Derek Jarman won four times during his lifetime, including the Best Feature Film winners The Last of England (1987) and Wittgenstein (1993). A Special Award in honor of his legacy was given in 2008.

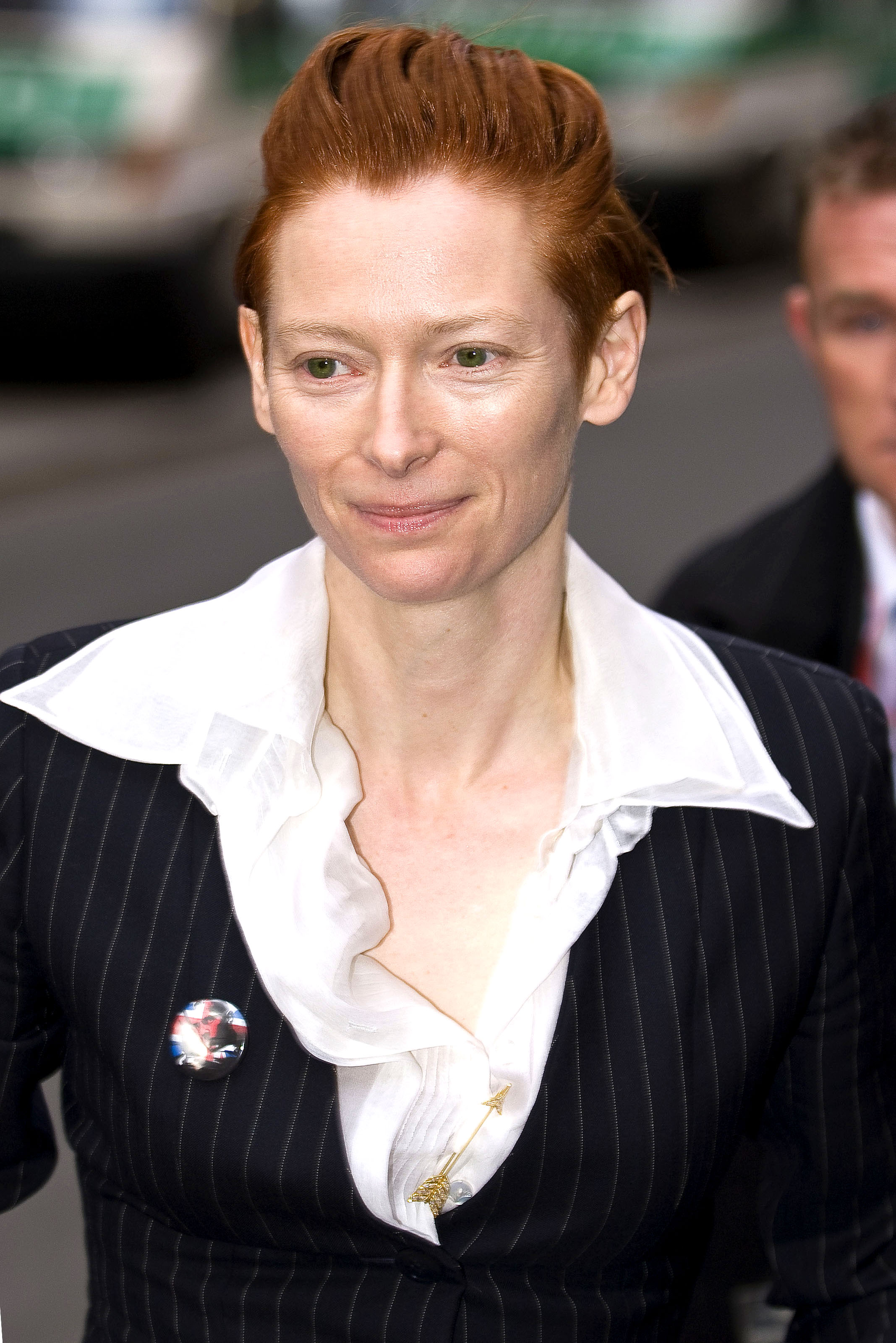
Tilda Swinton received the Jury Award in 1988. Starring in many films directed by Jarman, she was one of the 2008 Special Award recipients in honor of his legacy.

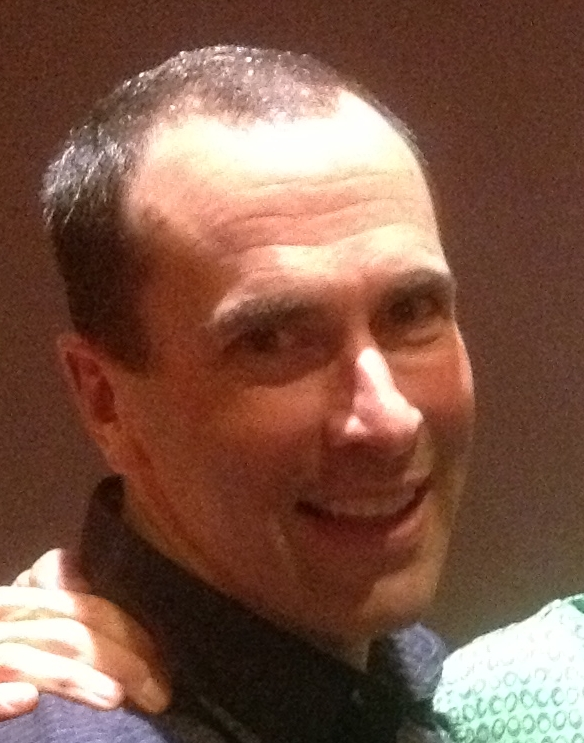
Canadian director John Greyson has won five times, including two in the Best Documentary/Essay Film categories for Urinal (1989) and Fig Trees (2009).

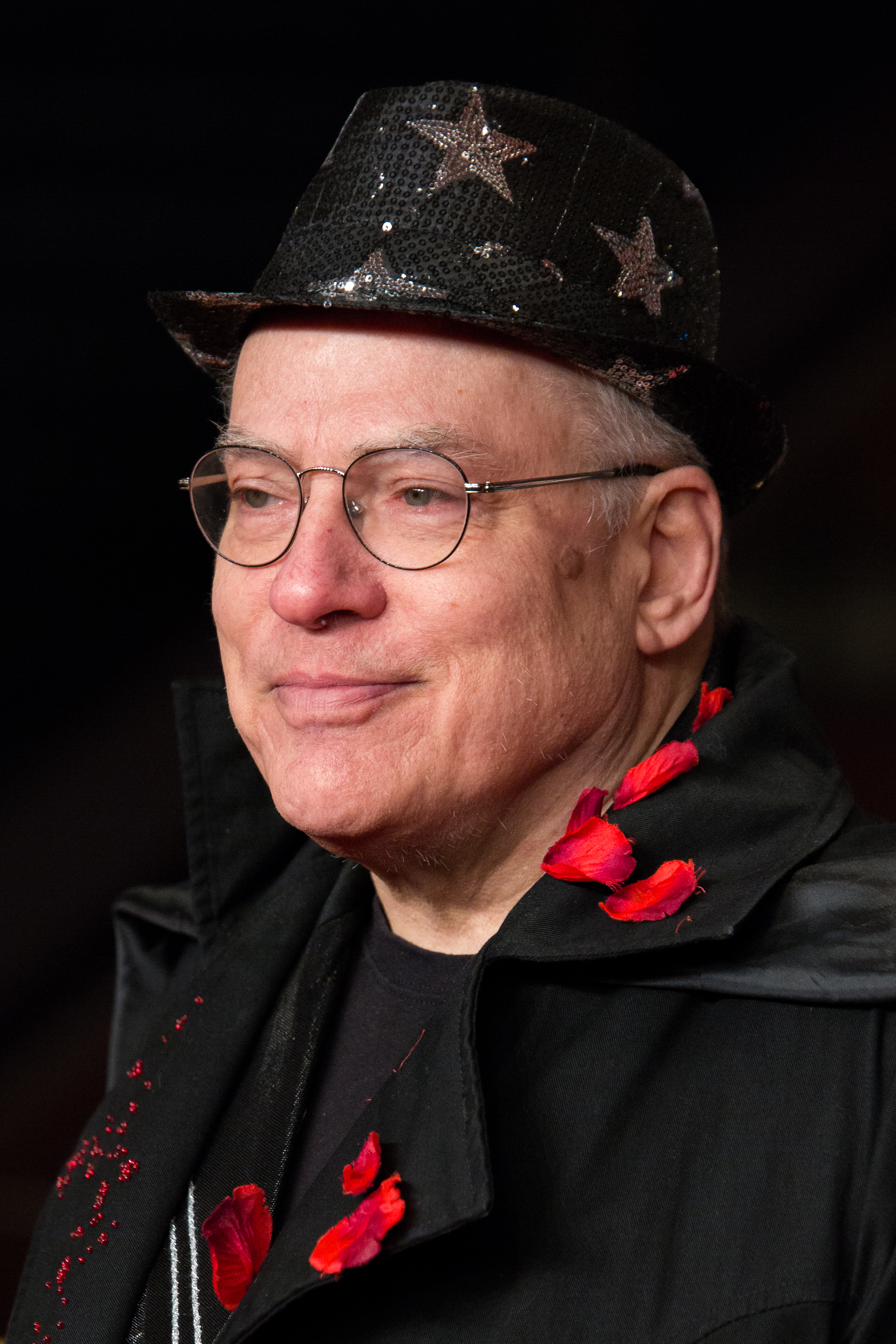
Rosa von Praunheim won the Jury Award for Silence = Death in 1990 and was honored with the Special Award in 2014.

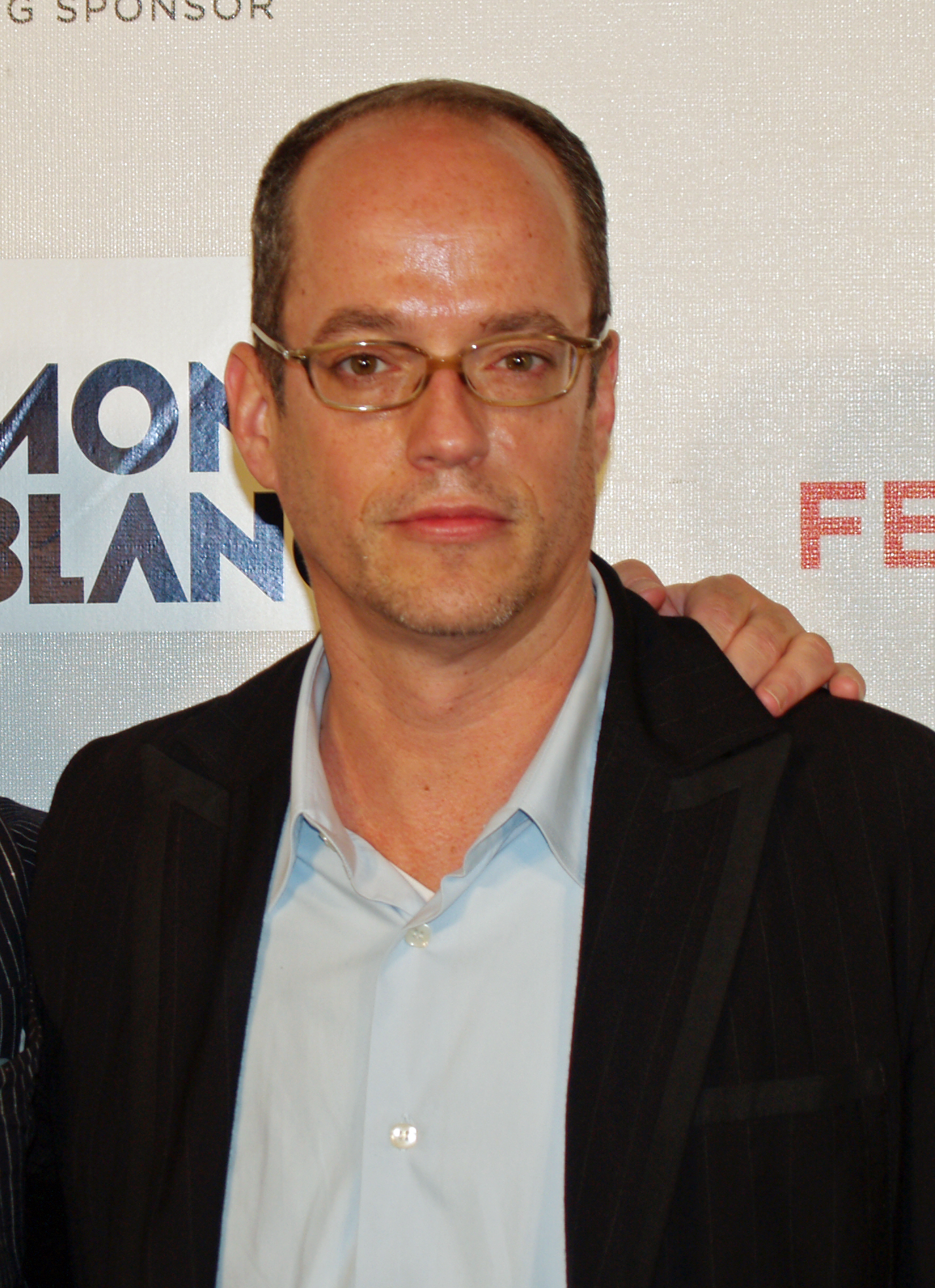
Directed by Tom Kalin, Swoon won the first Audience Award in 1992.

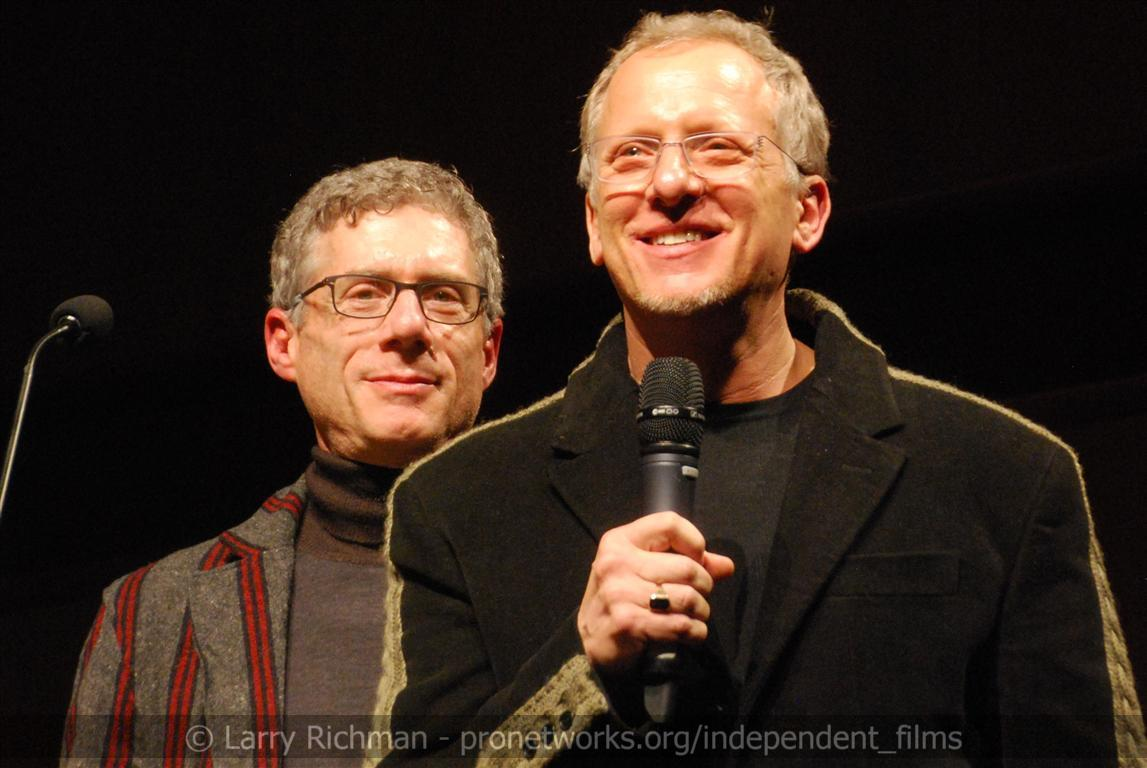
Rob Epstein and Jeffrey Friedman have won twice in the Best Documentary Film category for their collaboration on The Celluloid Closet (1996) and Paragraph 175 (2000).

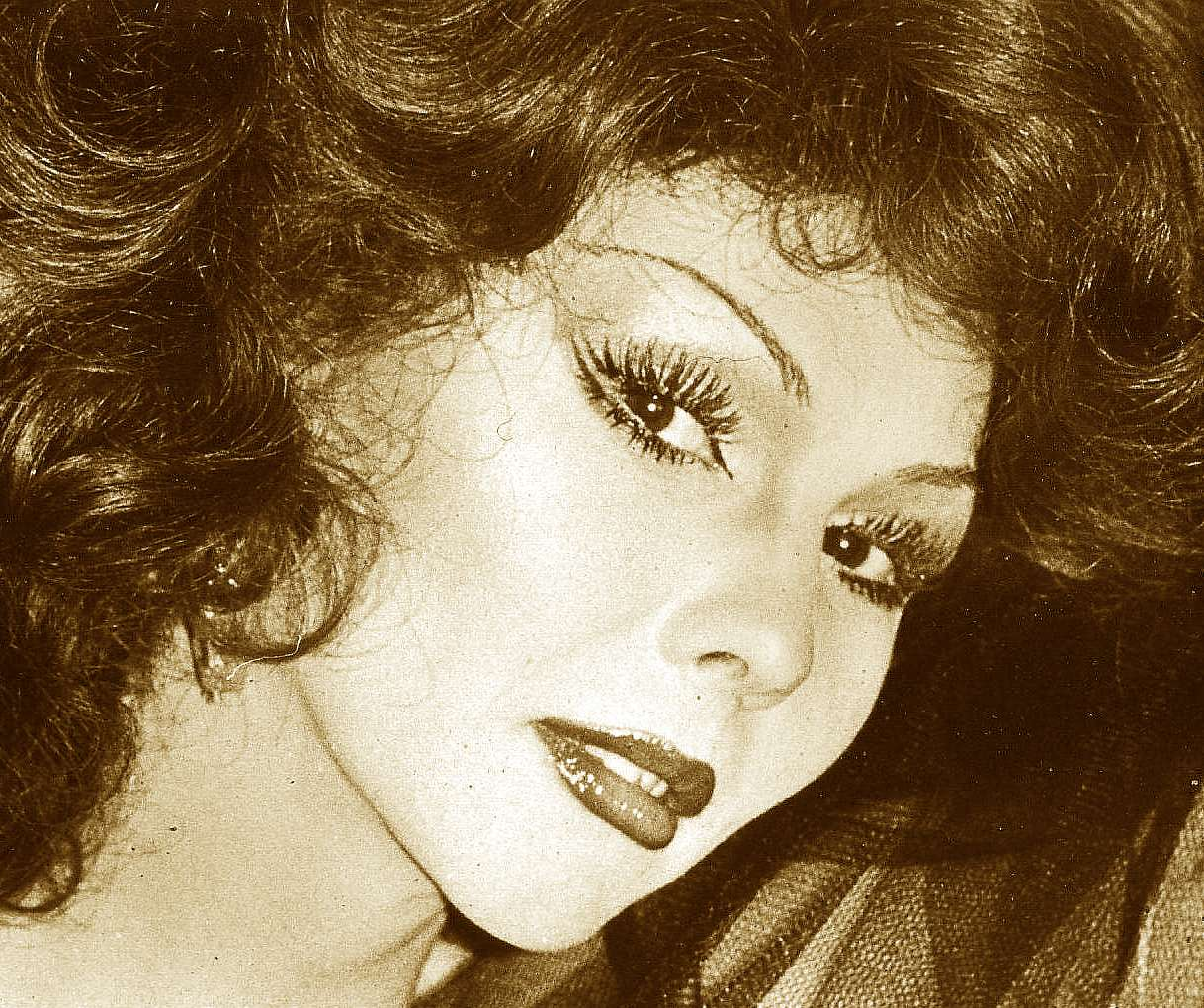
Romy Haag, the first individual Special Award winner in 1997.

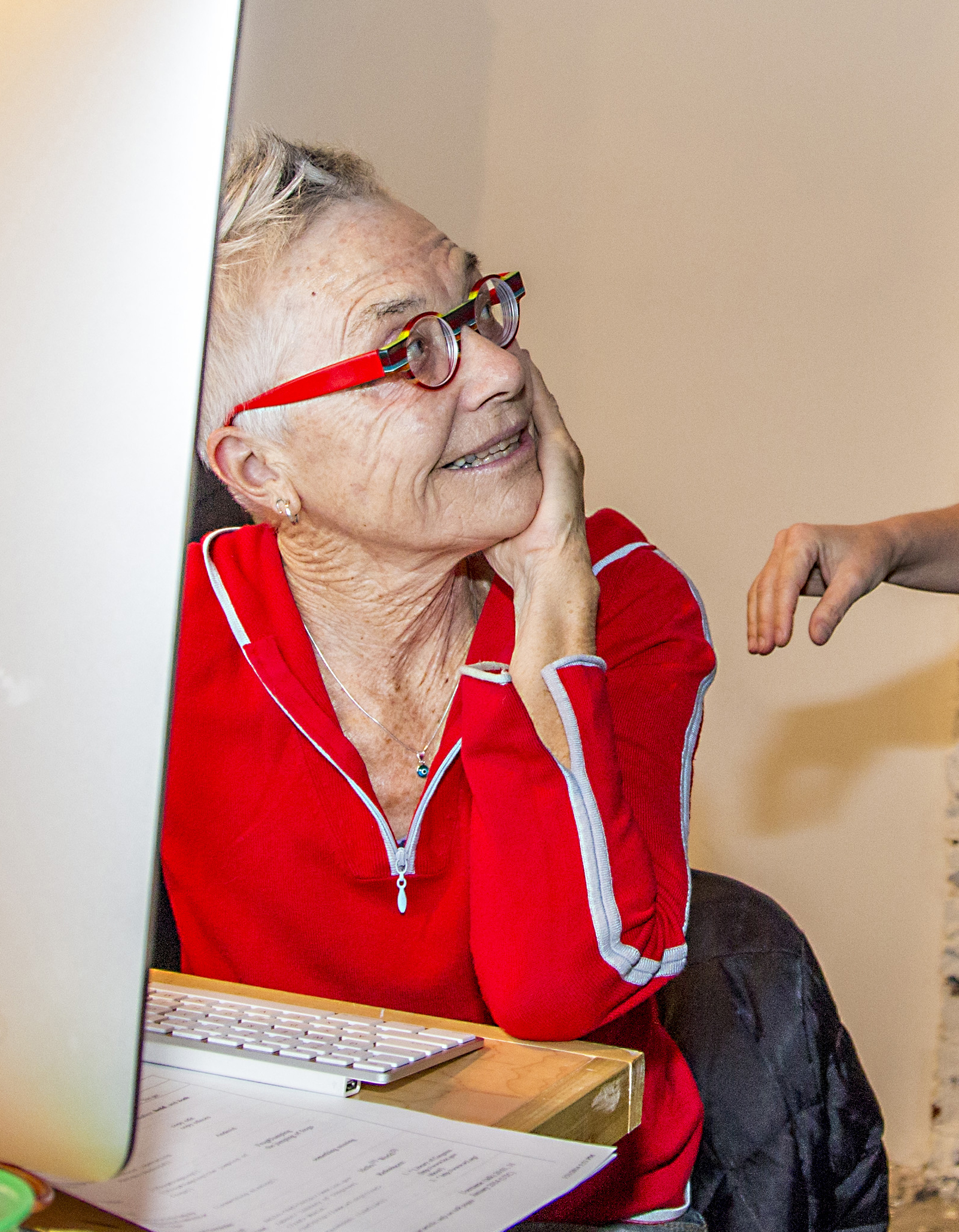
Three of Barbara Hammer films have won in the Best Short Film category: A Horse Is Not a Metaphor in 2009, Generations and Maya Deren's Sink in 2011.

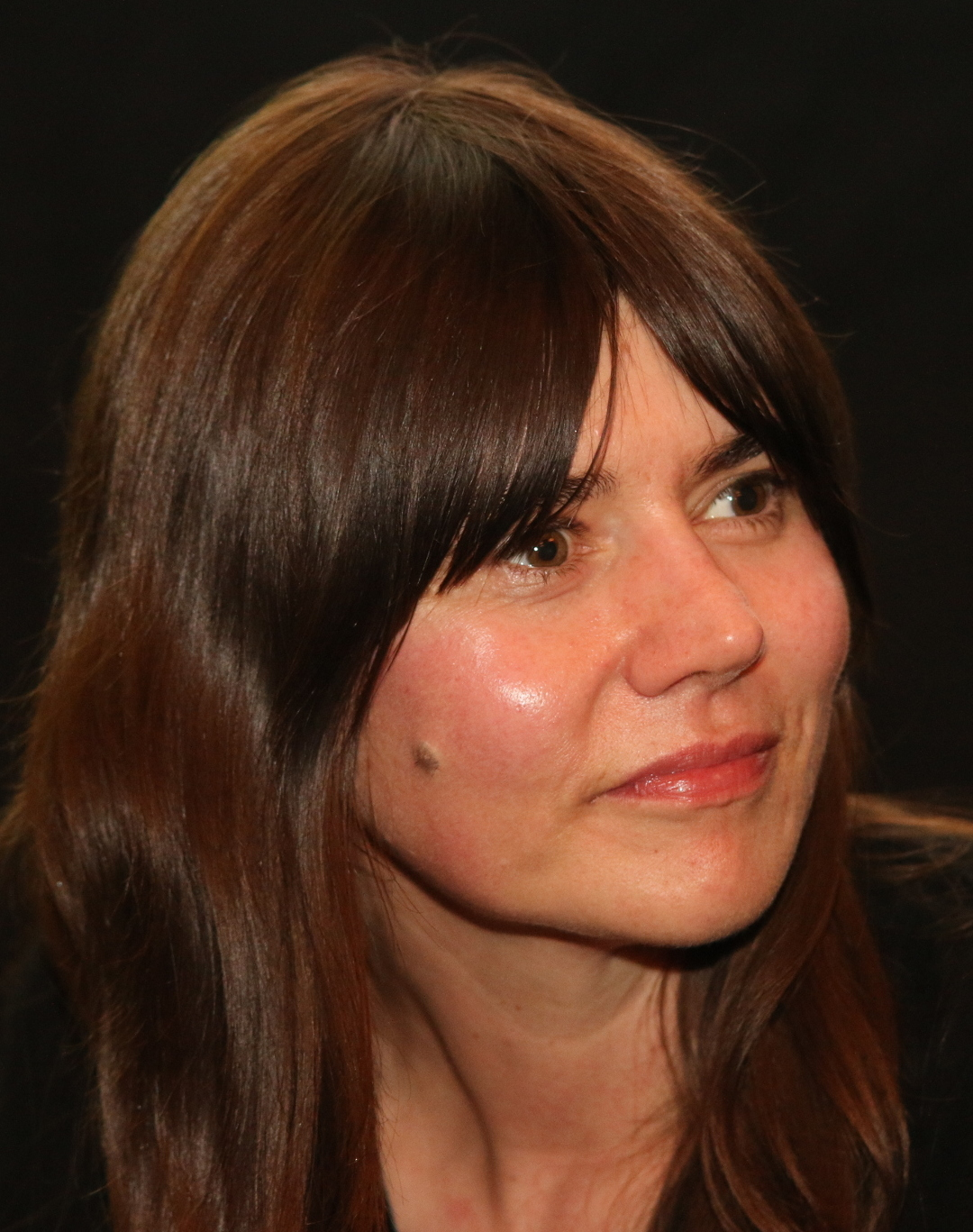
Małgorzata Szumowska's In the Name Of won Best Feature Film and Reader Award in 2013

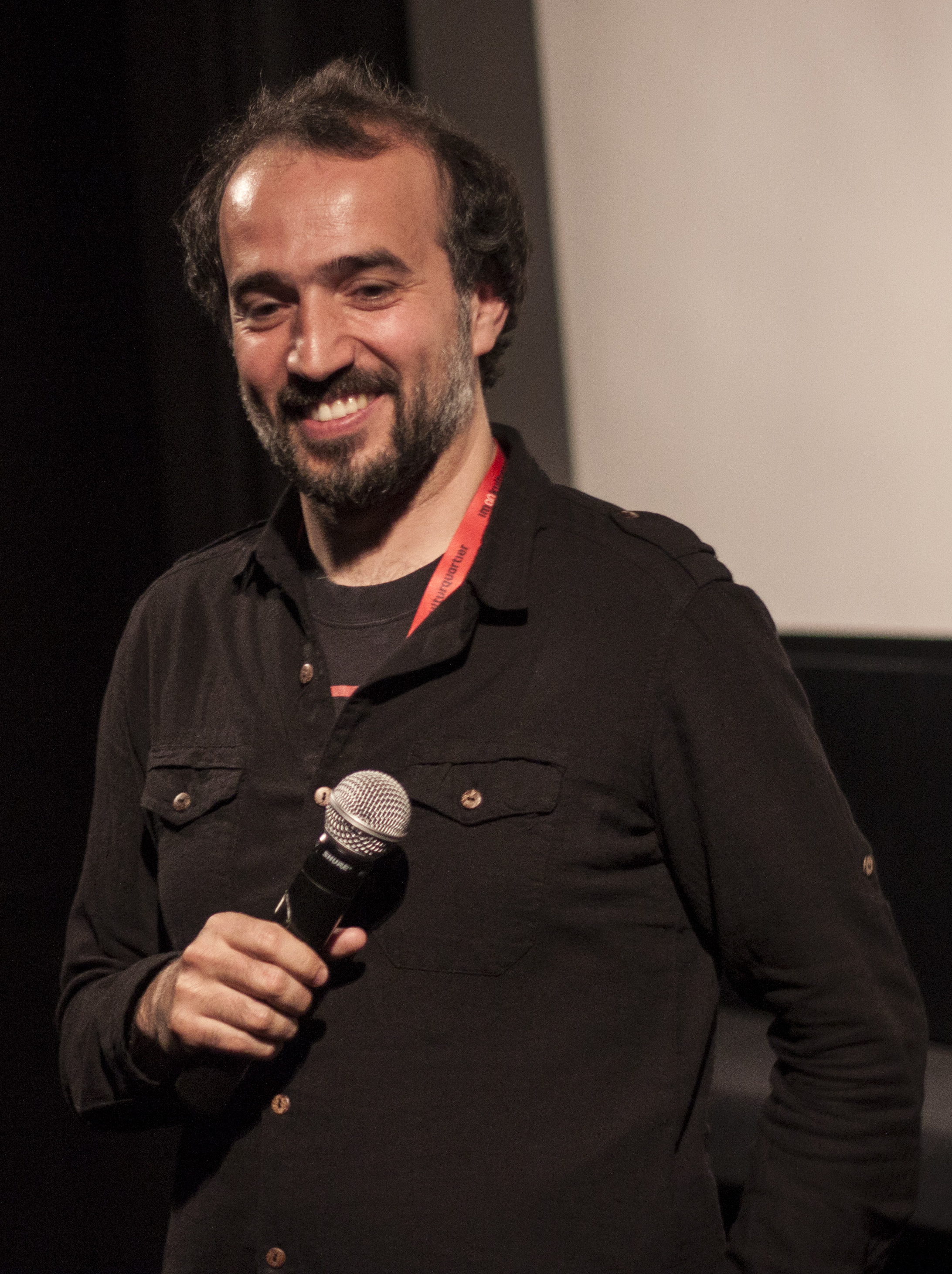
Ayat Najafi, co-director of Football Under Cover, won Best Documentary Film and Audience Award in 2008

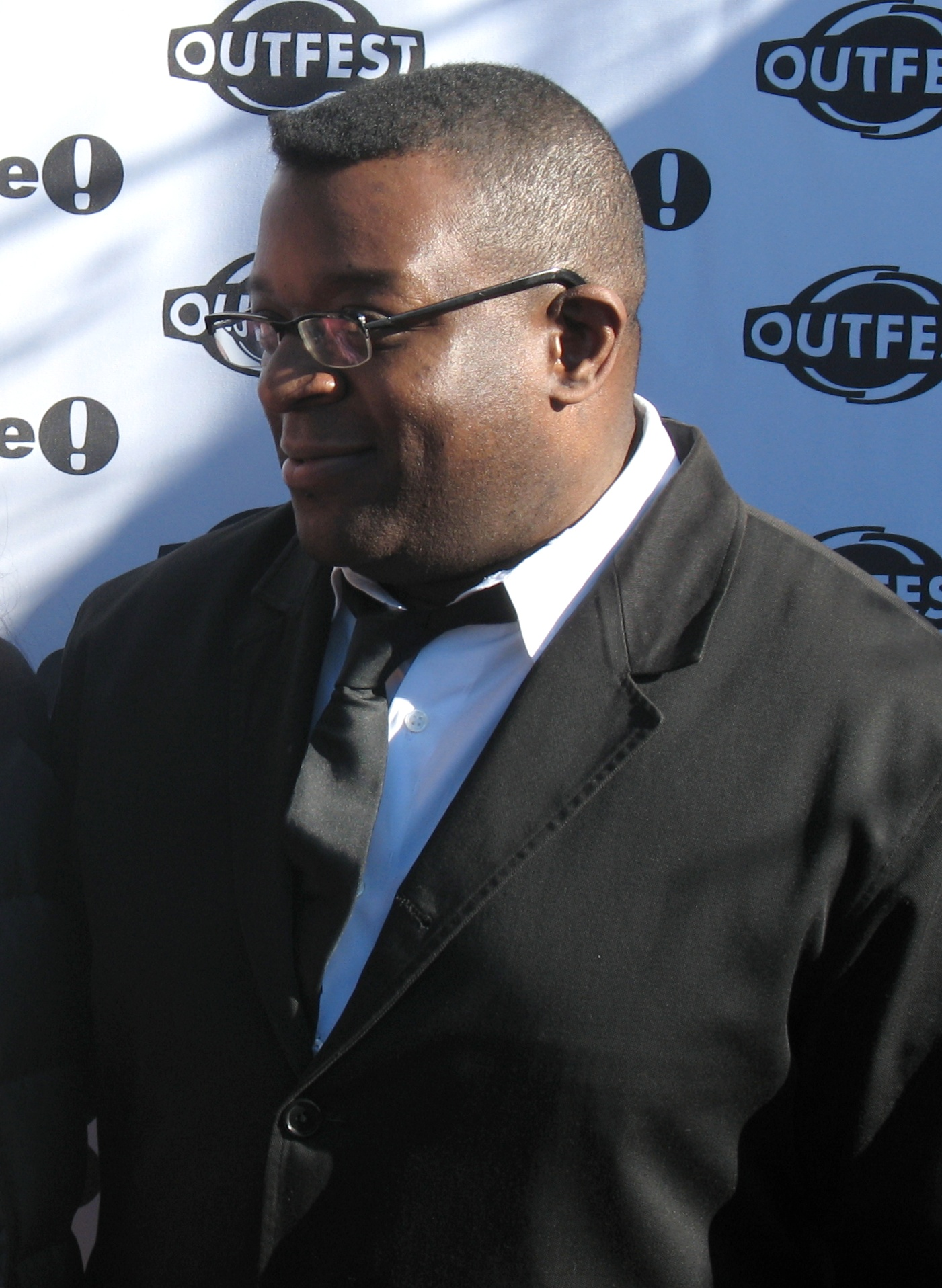
Isaac Julien won Best Feature Film for Looking for Langston in 1989, and a Special Award in honor of Jarman in 2008

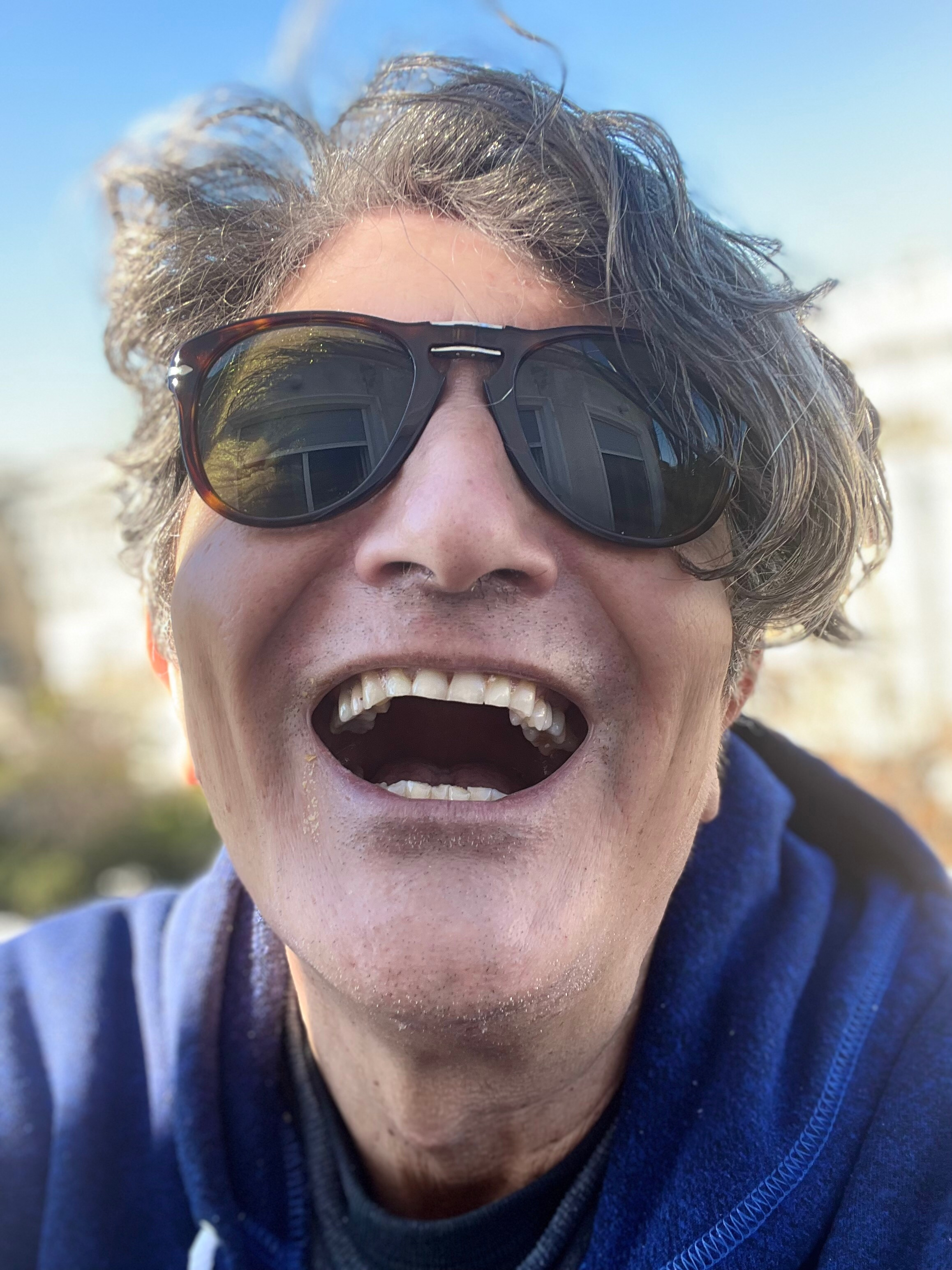
Constantine Giannaris won Best Short Film for Trojans (1990) and Caught Looking (1992)

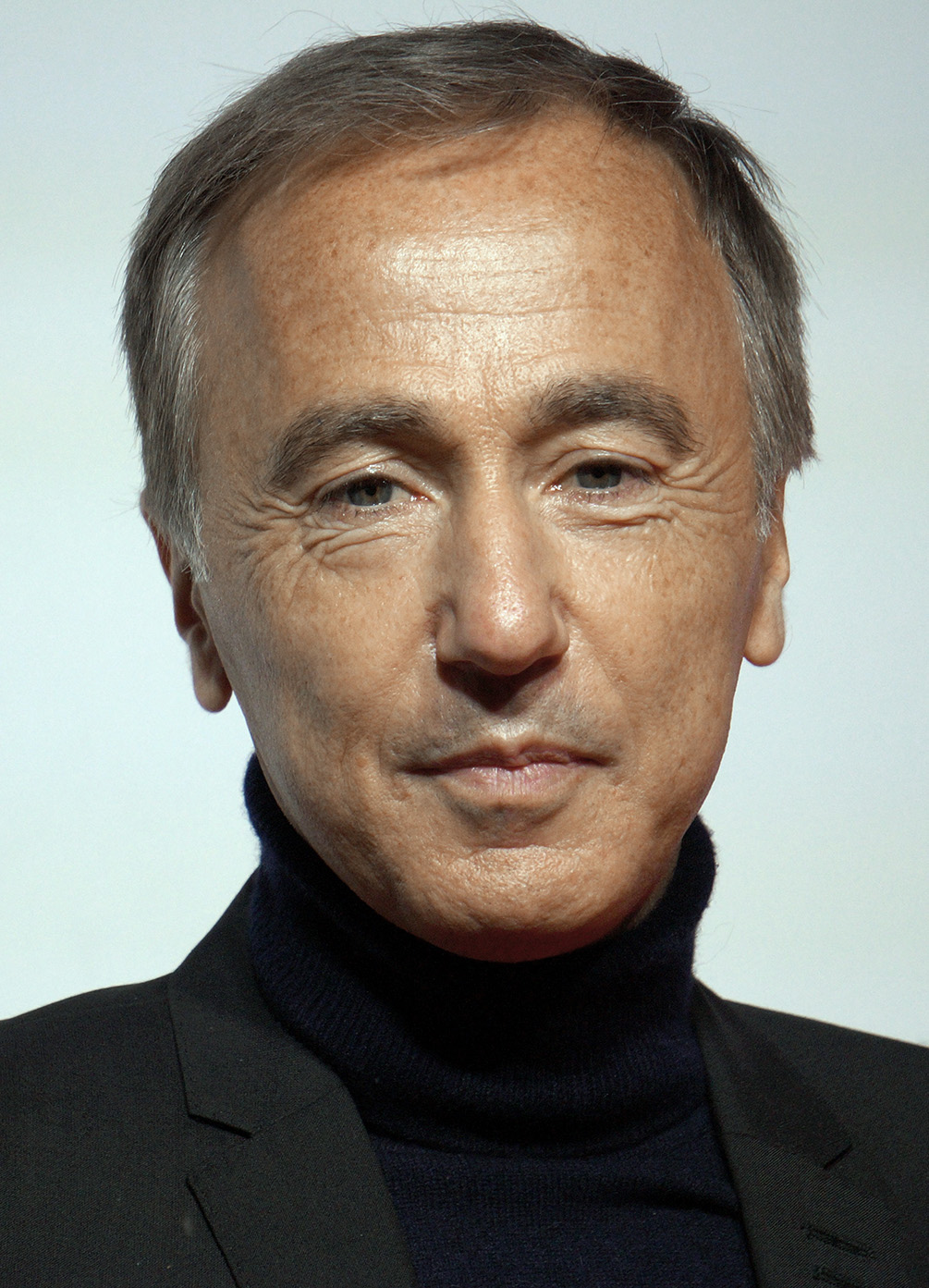
Sébastien Lifshitz won Best Feature Film for Wild Side (2004), and Best Documentary Film for Bambi (2013)

The Teddy Award is divided into three primary categories: Best Feature Film, Short Film, and Documentary Film. The jury picks three nominations within each category and ultimately selects one as the winner. As of 2012, the cash prize for the winners in these categories has been valued at a maximum of €3,000. The prize is intended to support various aspects of the winning films, such as financing film copies, subtitling, or advertising materials. In 2007, the jury decided not to grant an award in the Short Film category because the submitted films lacked adequate LGBT content. (Note: The 2007 Jury did not select a finalist for Best Short Film due to the lack of LGBT representation in the submissions. Instead, the Jury recognized Security Camera and Love Hurts, two public service announcements about mutual respect, in the Social Spots category. These announcements were produced by the MANEO Stop Violence Against Gays Project.) The Documentary and Essay Film categories were introduced in 1988 and were combined in several ceremonies between 2009 and 2020.

One other film is singled out for a Jury Award. A Special Award is commonly, but not always, given to one or more individuals for a distinguished achievement in LGBT cinema, such as a lifetime career achievement as a director or performer or for a person's role in a project of significance to the history of LGBT cinema.

The German LGBT magazine Siegessäule formerly sponsored an award that was given to a film selected by a panel of the magazine's readers. This was discontinued after 2012, but was reinstituted in 2016 under the new sponsorship of the magazine Männer; in 2017, the award was named the Harvey in honour of Harvey Milk.

Other categories include the Activist Award (2020), (Note: Isteev, Baranova, and Lapunov received the Activist Award for their efforts to fight for human rights during the anti-gay purges in Chechnya, detailed in David France's Welcome to Chechnya.) Social Spots (2007), David Kato Vision & Voice Award (2014–2015), (Note: Cambodian transgender activist Sou Sotheavy received the 2014 David Kato Vision and Voice Award for her effort to establish a national network of organizations to support the LGBT community in her native country.) (Note: Kier received the 2015 Special Award for setting the standard for nonstereotypical male characters and his exceptional filmography.) and Newcomer Award (2018).

Table key
| ‡ | Indicates Best Feature Film winners |
| † | Indicates individual winners |

List of films, with original titles, directors, and production countries
| Year | Category | English title | Original title | Director(s) or Recipient(s) | Ref. |
|---|---|---|---|---|---|
| 1987 | Best Feature Film | Law of Desire ‡ | La ley del deseo ‡ | Pedro Almodóvar | |
| 1987 | Best Short Film | My New Friend | | Gus Van Sant | |
| 1987 | Best Short Film | Five Ways to Kill Yourself | | Gus Van Sant | |
| 1988 | Best Feature Film | The Last of England ‡ | | Derek Jarman | |
| 1988 | Best Documentary Film | Rights And Reactions: Lesbian & Gay Rights On Trial | | Phil Zwickler and Jane Lippman | |
| 1988 | Best Essay Film | The Meadow of Things | Die Wiese der Sachen | Heinz Emigholz | |
| 1988 | Best Short Film | Alfalfa | | Richard Kwietniowski | |
| 1988 | Reader Award | The Last of England | | Derek Jarman | |
| 1988 | Jury Award | —N/a | | Tilda Swinton (Note: For her performance in The Last of England, her venture into experimental films, and dedication to LGBT-related films.) † | |
| 1989 | Best Feature Film | Looking for Langston ‡ | | Isaac Julien | |
| 1989 | Best Feature Film | Fun Down There ‡ | | Roger Stigliano | |
| 1989 | Best Documentary Film | Tiny & Ruby: Hell Divin' Women | | Greta Schiller and Andrea Weiss | |
| 1989 | Best Essay Film | Urinal | | John Greyson | |
| 1990 | Best Feature Film | Coming Out ‡ | | Heiner Carow | |
| 1990 | Best Documentary Film | Tongues Untied | | Marlon T. Riggs | |
| 1990 | Best Short Film | Trojans | Trojaner | Constantine Giannaris | |
| 1990 | Jury Award | Silence = Death | Schweigen = Tod | Rosa von Praunheim | |
| 1991 | Best Feature Film | Poison ‡ | | Todd Haynes | |
| 1991 | Best Documentary Film | Paris Is Burning | | Jennie Livingston | |
| 1991 | Best Short Film | Relax | | Chris Newby | |
| 1991 | Jury Award | The Making of Monsters | | John Greyson | |
| 1991 | Special Award | Forbidden Love | Zapovezená láska | Vladislav Kvasnička | |
| 1992 | Best Feature Film | Together Alone ‡ | | P. J. Castellaneta | |
| 1992 | Best Documentary Film | Voices from the Front | | David Meieran, Robyn Hut and Sandra Elgear | |
| 1992 | Best Short Film | Caught Looking | | Constantine Giannaris | |
| 1992 | Jury Award | Edward II | | Derek Jarman | |
| 1992 | Audience Award | Swoon | | Tom Kalin | |
| 1993 | Best Feature Film | Wittgenstein ‡ | | Derek Jarman | |
| 1993 | Best Documentary Film | Silverlake Life | | Tom Joslin and Peter Friedman | |
| 1993 | Best Short Film | P(l)ain Truth | | Ilppo Pohjola | |
| 1993 | Audience Award | Sex is... | | Marc Huestis | |
| 1994 | Best Feature Film | Go Fish ‡ | | Rose Troche | |
| 1994 | Best Documentary Film | Coming Out Under Fire | | Arthur Dong | |
| 1994 | Best Short Film | Carmelita Tropicana: Your Kunst Is Your Waffen | | Ela Troyano | |
| 1994 | Jury Award | Remembrance of Things Fast | | John Maybury | |
| 1994 | Reader Award | Heavy Blow | | Hoang A. Duong | |
| 1994 | Audience Award | Strawberry and Chocolate | Fresa y chocolate | Tomás Gutiérrez Alea and Juan Carlos Tabío | |
| 1995 | Best Feature Film | The Last Supper ‡ | | Cynthia Roberts | |
| 1995 | Best Documentary Film | Complaints of a Dutiful Daughter | | Deborah Hoffmann | |
| 1995 | Best Short Film | Trevor | | Peggy Rajski | |
| 1995 | Jury Award | Marble Ass | Дупе од мрамора | Želimir Žilnik | |
| 1995 | Reader Award | Ballot Measure 9 | | Heather Lyn Macdonald | |
| 1995 | Audience Award | Priest | | Antonia Bird | |
| 1996 | Best Feature Film | The Watermelon Woman ‡ | | Cheryl Dunye | |
| 1996 | Best Documentary Film | The Celluloid Closet | | Rob Epstein and Jeffrey Friedman | |
| 1996 | Best Essay Film | I'll Be Your Mirror | | Nan Goldin and Edmund Coulthard | |
| 1996 | Best Short Film | Unbound | | Claudia Morgado Escanilla | |
| 1996 | Best Short Film | Alkali, Iowa | | Mark Christopher | |
| 1996 | Jury Award | —N/a | | Jerry Tartaglia and Plaster Foundation (Note: Tartaglia and the Plaster Foundation received the 1996 Special Jury Prize for the preservation of the celluloid works of Jack Smith, a pioneer of queer underground cinema. The award was given to celebrate Teddy Award's 10th year anniversary.) † | |
| 1996 | Reader Award | Paris Was a Woman | | Greta Schiller | |
| 1997 | Best Feature Film | All Over Me ‡ | | Alex Sichel | |
| 1997 | Best Essay Film | Murder and Murder | | Yvonne Rainer | |
| 1997 | Best Short Film | Heroines of Love | Heldinnen der Liebe | Nathalie Percillier and Lily Besilly | |
| 1997 | Special Award | —N/a | | Romy Haag † | |
| 1997 | Reader Award | All Over Me | | Alex Sichel | |
| 1998 | Best Feature Film | Hold You Tight ‡ | | Stanley Kwan | |
| 1998 | Best Documentary Film | The Brandon Teena Story | | Susan Muska and Gréta Olafsdóttir | |
| 1998 | Best Short Film | Peppermills | | Isabel Hegner | |
| 1998 | Jury Award | The Man in Her Life | Ang Lalaki sa Buhay ni Selya | Carlos Siguion-Reyna | |
| 1998 | Reader Award | The Brandon Teena Story | | Susan Muska and Gréta Olafsdóttir | |
| 1998 | Special Award | —N/a | | Richard O'Brien † | |
| 1998 | Special Mention | Uncut | | John Greyson | |
| 1999 | Best Feature Film | Show Me Love ‡ | Fucking Åmål ‡ | Lukas Moodysson | |
| 1999 | Best Documentary Film | The Man Who Drove with Mandela | | Greta Schiller | |
| 1999 | Best Short Film | Liu Awaiting Spring | | Andrew Soo | |
| 1999 | Jury Award | Aimée & Jaguar (Note: The 1999 Jury Award was given to all five German LGBT-related films in the competition due to their exceptional quality and diversity: Aimée & Jaguar, Lola and Billy the Kid, Gendernauts: A Journey Through Shifting Identities, Piglets, NY'NY 'n Why Not. Speck accepted this award on the films' behalf.) | | Max Färberböck | |
| 1999 | Jury Award | Lola and Billy the Kid | Lola und Bilidikid | Kutluğ Ataman | |
| 1999 | Jury Award | Gendernauts: A Journey Through Shifting Identities | Gendernauts | Monika Treut | |
| 1999 | Jury Award | Piglets | Ferkel | Luc Feit | |
| 1999 | Jury Award | NY'NY 'n Why Not | | Michael Brynntrup | |
| 1999 | Reader Award | Trick | | Jim Fall | |
| 2000 | Best Feature Film | Water Drops on Burning Rocks ‡ | Gouttes d'eau sur pierres brûlantes ‡ | François Ozon | |
| 2000 | Best Documentary Film | Paragraph 175 | | Rob Epstein and Jeffrey Friedman | |
| 2000 | Best Short Film | Sticky Dough | Hartes Brot | Nathalie Percillier | |
| 2000 | Jury Award | Funny Felix | Drôle de Félix | Olivier Ducastel and Jacques Martineau | |
| 2000 | Jury Award | Chrissy | | Jacqui North | |
| 2000 | Reader Award | Funny Felix | Drôle de Félix | Olivier Ducastel and Jacques Martineau | |
| 2001 | Best Feature Film | Hedwig and the Angry Inch ‡ | | John Cameron Mitchell | |
| 2001 | Best Documentary Film | Trembling Before G-d | | Sandi Simcha DuBowski | |
| 2001 | Best Short Film | Erè Mèla Mèla | | Daniel Wiroth | |
| 2001 | Jury Award | Forbidden Fruit | | Sue Maluwa-Bruce and Beate Kunath | |
| 2001 | Reader Award | The Iron Ladies | Sa tree lex | Yongyoot Thongkongtoon | |
| 2001 | Special Award | —N/a | | Moritz de Hadeln (Note: de Hadeln received the 2001 Special Award for his relentless support of LGBT-related films, and for acknowledging the Teddy Award as an official award of the Berlinale in 1992.) † | |
| 2001 | Special Mention | Chop Suey (Note: The 2001 Jury made Special Mention of two films: Chop Suey for its daring exploration and Weber's unique vision as a photographer; and The Iron Ladies for its engaging true-life story of a gay and transexual volleyball team.) | | Bruce Weber | |
| 2001 | Special Mention | The Iron Ladies | Sa tree lex | Yongyoot Thongkongtoon | |
| 2002 | Best Feature Film | Walking on Water ‡ | | Tony Ayres | |
| 2002 | Best Documentary Film | All About My Father | Alt om min Far | Even Benestad | |
| 2002 | Best Short Film | Celebration | | Daniel Stedman | |
| 2002 | Jury Award | Just a Woman | Juste une femme | Mitra Farahani | |
| 2002 | Reader Award | Walking on Water | Walking on Water | Tony Ayres | |
| 2003 | Best Feature Film | A Thousand Clouds of Peace ‡ | Mil nubes de paz cercan el cielo, amor, jamás acabarás de ser amor ‡ | Julián Hernández | |
| 2003 | Best Documentary Film | Talk Straight: The World of Rural Queers | Ich kenn keinen – Allein unter Heteros | Jochen Hick | |
| 2003 | Best Short Film | Precious Moments | Fremragende Timer | Lars Krutzkoff and Jan Dalchow | |
| 2003 | Reader Award | The Event | | Thom Fitzgerald | |
| 2003 | Special Award | —N/a | | F. W. Murnau † | |
| 2004 | Best Feature Film | Wild Side ‡ | | Sébastien Lifshitz | |
| 2004 | Best Documentary Film | The Nomi Song | | Andrew Horn | |
| 2004 | Best Short Film | With What Shall I Wash It? | Con qué la lavaré? | Maria Trénor | |
| 2004 | Reader Award | D.E.B.S. | | Angela Robinson | |
| 2004 | Special Award | —N/a | | Edition Salzgeber (Note: The 2004 Special Award was given to Edition Salzgeber, a German-based film distributor, for its outstanding LGBT-related work and its founder Manfred Salzgeber (1943–1994).) † | |
| 2005 | Best Feature Film | A Year Without Love ‡ | Un año sin amor ‡ | Anahí Berneri | |
| 2005 | Best Documentary Film | Feline Masquerade | Katzenball | Veronika Minder | |
| 2005 | Best Short Film | The Intervention | | Jay Duplass | |
| 2005 | Reader Award | Transamerica | | Duncan Tucker | |
| 2006 | Best Feature Film | The Blossoming of Maximo Oliveros ‡ | Ang Pagdadalaga ni Maximo Oliveros ‡ | Auraeus Solito | |
| 2006 | Best Documentary Film | Beyond Hatred | Au-delà de la haine | Olivier Meyrou | |
| 2006 | Best Short Film | The Day I Died | El día que morí | Maryam Keshavarz | |
| 2006 | Jury Award | Combat | | Patrick Carpentier | |
| 2006 | Reader Award | Paper Dolls | Bubot Niyar | Tomer Heymann | |
| 2007 | Best Feature Film | Spider Lilies ‡ | Ci-Qing ‡ | Zero Chou | |
| 2007 | Best Documentary Film | A Walk Into the Sea: Danny Williams and the Warhol Factory | | Esther B. Robinson | |
| 2007 | Audience Award | Notes on a Scandal | | Richard Eyre | |
| 2007 | Reader Award | The Bubble | | Eytan Fox | |
| 2007 | Social Spots | Security Camera | Überwachungskamera | MANEO Stop Violence Against Gays Project | |
| 2007 | Social Spots | Love Hurts | | MANEO Stop Violence Against Gays Project | |
| 2007 | Special Award | —N/a | | Helmut Berger † | |
| 2007 | Special Mention | La León (Note: La León received the 2007 Special Mention for its outstanding cinematography in portraying an isolated existence in Argentina.) | | Santiago Otheguy | |
| 2008 | Best Feature Film | The Amazing Truth About Queen Raquela ‡ | Die reine Wahrheit über Queen Raquela ‡ | Olaf de Fleur | |
| 2008 | Best Documentary Film | Football Under Cover | | David Assman and Ayat Najafi | |
| 2008 | Audience Award | Football Under Cover | | David Assman and Ayat Najafi | |
| 2008 | Best Short Film | Tá | | Felipe Sholl | |
| 2008 | Jury Award | Be Like Others | | Tanaz Eshaghian | |
| 2008 | Reader Award | Be Like Others | | Tanaz Eshaghian | |
| 2008 | Special Award | —N/a | | Hans Stempel and Martin Ripkens (Note: At the 2008 ceremony, two Special Awards were given: one for Stempel and Ripkens for their career achievements as film critics and filmmakers; one for Collins, Turner, Julien, Mackay, and Swinton for looking after the heritage of British filmmaker Derek Jarman.) † | |
| 2008 | Special Award | —N/a | | Keith Collins, Simon Fisher Turner, Isaac Julien, James Mackay and Tilda Swinton † | |
| 2009 | Best Feature Film | Raging Sun, Raging Sky ‡ | Rabioso sol, rabioso cielo ‡ | Julián Hernández | |
| 2009 | Best Documentary/Essay Film | Fig Trees | | John Greyson | |
| 2009 | Best Short Film | A Horse Is Not a Metaphor | | Barbara Hammer | |
| 2009 | Reader Award | City of Borders | | Yun Suh | |
| 2009 | Special Award | —N/a | | Joe Dallesandro (Note: At the 2009 ceremony, two Special Awards were given: one to Dallesandro for his career achievements as an underground actor, and Hurt for his acting performance in An Englishman In New York.) † | |
| 2009 | Special Award | —N/a | | John Hurt † | |
| 2010 | Best Feature Film | The Kids Are All Right ‡ | | Lisa Cholodenko | |
| 2010 | Best Documentary/Essay Film | The Mouth of the Wolf | La bocca del lupo | Pietro Marcello | |
| 2010 | Best Short Film | The Feast of Stephen | | James Franco | |
| 2010 | Jury Award | Open | | Jake Yuzna | |
| 2010 | Reader Award | Postcard to Daddy | | Michael Stock | |
| 2010 | Special Award | —N/a | | Werner Schroeter (Note: Schroeter received the 2010 Special Award for his outstanding work as an opera director, one of the leading filmmakers of the New German Cinema movement, and his influence on gay culture.) † | |
| 2011 | Best Feature Film | Absent ‡ | Ausente ‡ | Marco Berger | |
| 2011 | Best Documentary/Essay Film | The Ballad of Genesis and Lady Jaye | | Marie Losier | |
| 2011 | Best Short Film | Generations | | Barbara Hammer and Gina Carducci | |
| 2011 | Best Short Film | Maya Deren's Sink | | Barbara Hammer | |
| 2011 | Jury Award | Tomboy | | Céline Sciamma | |
| 2011 | Reader Award | Harvest | Stadt Land Fluss | Benjamin Cantu | |
| 2011 | Special Award | —N/a | | Pieter-Dirk Uys (Note: Uys received the 2011 Special Award for his commitment to AIDS education in South Africa and his stage alter ego Evita Bezuidenhoud.) † | |
| 2012 | Best Feature Film | Keep the Lights On ‡ | | Ira Sachs | |
| 2012 | Best Documentary Film | Call Me Kuchu | | Malika Zouhali-Worrall and Katherine Fairfax Wright | |
| 2012 | Best Short Film | Loxoro | | Claudia Llosa | |
| 2012 | Jury Award | Jaurès | | Vincent Dieutre | |
| 2012 | Reader Award | The Parade | Parade | Srđan Dragojević | |
| 2012 | Special Award | —N/a | | Ulrike Ottinger (Note: At the 2012 ceremony, two Special Awards were given: one to Ottinger for her exceptional contribution to the German cinema, and Montez for his theatre work and collaboration with directors Jack Smith, Andy Warhol, and Ron Rice.) † | |
| 2012 | Special Award | —N/a | | Mario Montez † | |
| 2013 | Best Feature Film | In the Name of ‡ | W imię... ‡ | Małgorzata Szumowska | |
| 2013 | Best Documentary Film | Bambi | | Sébastien Lifshitz | |
| 2013 | Best Short Film | Undress Me | Ta av mig | Victor Lindgren | |
| 2013 | Jury Award | Concussion | | Stacie Passon | |
| 2013 | Reader Award | In the Name of | W imię... | Małgorzata Szumowska | |
| 2013 | Special Award | —N/a | | STEPS for the Future (Note: STEPS for the Future, a South African film project, received the Special Award for its commitment to HIV education.) † | |
| 2014 | Best Feature Film | The Way He Looks ‡ | Hoje eu quero voltar sozinho ‡ | Daniel Ribeiro | |
| 2014 | Best Documentary Film | The Circle | Der Kreis | Stefan Haupt | |
| 2014 | Best Short Film | Mondial 2010 | | Roy Dib | |
| 2014 | Jury Award | Pierrot Lunaire | | Bruce LaBruce | |
| 2014 | Reader Award | 52 Tuesdays | | Sophie Hyde | |
| 2014 | Special Award | —N/a | | Rosa von Praunheim (Note: At the 2014 ceremony, two Special Awards were given: one to Praunheim for his emotional and socially conscious films, and Mikesch for her challenging work as a photographer, filmmaker, and camerawomen.) † | |
| 2014 | Special Award | —N/a | | Elfi Mikesch † | |
| 2014 | David Kato Vision and Voice Award | —N/a | | Sou Sotheavy† | |
| 2015 | Best Feature Film | Nasty Baby ‡ | | Sebastián Silva | |
| 2015 | Best Documentary/Essay Film | The New Man | El hombre nuevo | Aldo Garay | |
| 2015 | Best Short Film | Saint Christopher | San Cristóbal | Omar Zúñiga Hidalgo | |
| 2015 | Jury Award | Stories of Our Lives | | Jim Chuchu | |
| 2015 | Reader Award | Thanatos, Drunk | Zuì Shēng Mèng Sǐ | Chang Tso-chi | |
| 2015 | Special Award | —N/a | | Udo Kier † | |
| 2015 | David Kato Vision & Voice Award | —N/a | | Martha Tholanah (Note: HIV-positive activist Tholanah received the 2015 David Kato Vision & Voice Award for her support to the LGBTI community in Zimbabwe.) † | |
| 2016 | Best Feature Film | Tomcat ‡ | Kater ‡ | Händl Klaus | |
| 2016 | Best Documentary Film | Kiki | | Sara Jordenö | |
| 2016 | Best Short Film | Moms on Fire | | Joanna Rytel | |
| 2016 | Jury Award | You'll Never Be Alone | Nunca vas a estar solo | Álex Anwandter | |
| 2016 | Audience Award | Paris 05:59: Théo & Hugo | Théo et Hugo dans le même bateau | Olivier Ducastel and Jacques Martineau | |
| 2016 | Reader Award | Don't Call Me Son | Mãe só há uma | Anna Muylaert | |
| 2016 | Special Award | —N/a | | Christine Vachon (Note: Vachon received the 2016 Special Award for creating Killer Films, a film production company, and her LGBT-related work as a film producer.) † | |
| 2017 | Best Feature Film | A Fantastic Woman ‡ | Una mujer fantástica ‡ | Sebastián Lelio | |
| 2017 | Best Documentary Film | Small Talk | Cidade Pequena | Hui-chen Huang | |
| 2017 | Best Short Film | My Gay Sister | Min Homosyster | Lia Hietala | |
| 2017 | Jury Award | Close-Knit | Karera ga Honki de Amu toki wa | Naoko Ogigami | |
| 2017 | Reader Award | God's Own Country | | Francis Lee | |
| 2017 | Special Award | —N/a | | Monika Treut (Note: Treut received the 2017 Special Award for her contribution to independent filmmaking, as one of the pioneers of the New Queer Cinema.) † | |
| 2018 | Best Feature Film | Hard Paint ‡ | Tinta Bruta ‡ | Filipe Matzembacher and Marcio Reolon | |
| 2018 | Best Documentary/Essay Film | Tranny Fag | Bixa Travesty | Claudia Priscilla and Kiko Goifman | |
| 2018 | Best Short Film | Three Centimetres | | Lara Zeidan | |
| 2018 | Jury Award | Obscuro Barroco | | Evangelia Kranioti | |
| 2018 | Newcomer Award | Retablo | | Alvaro Delgado-Aparicio | |
| 2018 | Reader Award | The Heiresses | Las herederas | Marcelo Martinessi | |
| 2019 | Best Feature Film | Brief Story from the Green Planet ‡ | Breve historia del planeta verde ‡ | Santiago Loza | |
| 2019 | Best Documentary/Essay Film | Lemebel | | Joanna Reposi Garibaldi | |
| 2019 | Best Short Film | Entropia | | Flóra Anna Buda | |
| 2019 | Jury Award | A Dog Barking at the Moon | | Xiang Zi | |
| 2019 | Reader Award | Brief Story from the Green Planet | Breve historia del planeta verde | Santiago Loza | |
| 2019 | Special Award | —N/a | | Falk Richter (Note: Richter received the 2019 Special Award for his outstanding work as a theatre director and an activist, as well as his influence to the queer and cosmopolitan cinema.) † | |
| 2020 | Best Feature Film | No Hard Feelings ‡ | Futur Drei ‡ | Faraz Shariat | |
| 2020 | Best Documentary/Essay Film | If It Were Love | Si c'était de l'amour | Patric Chiha | |
| 2020 | Best Short Film | Playback | Playback. Ensayo de una despedida | Agustina Comedi | |
| 2020 | Jury Award | Days | Rizi | Tsai Ming-liang | |
| 2020 | Reader Award | No Hard Feelings | Futur Drei | Faraz Shariat | |
| 2020 | Activist Award | —N/a | | David Isteev, Olga Baranova and Maxim Lapunov † | |
| 2021 | Best Feature Film | Miguel's War ‡ | | Eliane Raheb | |
| 2021 | Best Short Film | International Dawn Chorus Day | | John Greyson | |
| 2021 | Jury Award | Instructions for Survival | | Yana Ugrekhelidze | |
| 2021 | Special Award | —N/a | | Jenni Olson (Note: Olson received the 2021 Special Award for her achievements in filmmaking, film preservation, and her influence in queer film culture.) † | |
| 2022 | Best Feature Film | Three Tidy Tigers Tied a Tie Tighter ‡ | Três tigres tristes ‡ | Gustavo Vinagre | |
| 2022 | Best Documentary Film | Alis | | Clare Weiskopf, Nicolás van Hemelryck | |
| 2022 | Best Short Film | Exalted Mars | Mars Exalté | Jean-Sébastien Chauvin | |
| 2022 | Jury Award | Nelly & Nadine | | Magnus Gertten | |
| 2023 | Best Feature Film | All the Colours of the World Are Between Black and White ‡ | | Babatunde Apalowo | |
| 2023 | Best Documentary Film | Orlando, My Political Biography | Orlando, ma biographie politique | Paul B. Preciado | |
| 2023 | Best Short Film | Dipped in Black | Marungka tjalatjunu | Matthew Thorne, Derik Lynch | |
| 2023 | Jury Award | —N/a | | Vicky Knight † | |
| 2023 | Special Award | —N/a | | Andriy Khalpakhchi, Bohdan Zhuk † | |
| 2024 | Best Feature Film | All Shall Be Well ‡ | | Ray Yeung | |
| 2024 | Best Documentary Film | Teaches of Peaches | | Judy Landkammer, Philipp Fussenegger | |
| 2024 | Best Short Film | Grandmamauntsistercat | | Zuza Banasińska | |
| 2024 | Jury Award | Crossing | | Levan Akin † | |
| 2024 | Special Award | —N/a | | Lothar Lambert † | |
| 2025 | Best Feature Film | Lesbian Space Princess ‡ | | Emma Hough Hobbs, Leela Varghese | |
| 2025 | Best Documentary Film | Satanic Sow | Satanische Sau | Rosa von Praunheim | |
| 2025 | Best Short Film | Lloyd Wong, Unfinished | | Lesley Loksi Chan | |
| 2025 | Jury Award | If You Are Afraid You Put Your Heart into Your Mouth and Smile | Wenn du Angst hast nimmst du dein Herz in den Mund und lächelst | Marie Luise Lehner | |
| 2025 | Special Award | —N/a | | Todd Haynes † | |
| 2026 | Best Feature Film | Iván & Hadoum | | Ian de la Rosa | |
| 2026 | Best Documentary Film | Barbara Forever | | Brydie O'Connor | |
| 2026 | Best Short Film | Taxi Moto | | Gaël Kamilindi | |
| 2026 | Jury Award | Trial of Hein | Der Heimatlose | Kai Stänicke | |
| 2026 | Special Award | —N/a | | Céline Sciamma † | |

== See also ==
- Frameline Audience Award for Best Feature
- Queer Lion
- Queer Palm
- Sebastiane Award
