= The Brandon Teena Story =

- Directed by: Susan Muska; Greta Olafsdottir
- Produced by: Jane Dekrone
- Cinematography: Susan Muska; Greta Olafsdottir
- Edited by: Susan Muska; Greta Olafsdottir
- Music by: Geoff Marx; Thomas Muer
- Production company: Bless Bless Productions
- Distributed by: Zeitgeist Films
- Release date: 1998
- Running time: 90 minutes
- Country: United States
- Language: English

The Brandon Teena Story is a 1998 American documentary film directed by Susan Muska and Greta Olafsdottir. The documentary features interviews with many of the people involved with the 1993 murder of Brandon Teena as well as archive footage of Teena. After its theatrical release, it aired on Cinemax as part of its Reel Life series.

== Plot ==
The film follows the story of Teena, a transgender man who was raped and murdered in rural Nebraska in 1993. The filmmakers drew on interrogation tapes, trial transcripts, photographs, and archival footage to reconstruct the events surrounding the case.

== Reception ==
In his 1998 review for The New York Times, Stephen Holden wrote that the film showed viewers that, in the "Land of the Pickup Truck," there still existed an ingrained fear and hatred of nonconforming sexuality. The film was generally well received, earning a 69% approval rating from thirteen verified critics on Rotten Tomatoes and a 68% audience score from more than a thousand reviewers.

"The Brandon Teena Story" is a study of the banality of evil based on deep-seated prejudices", says David Stratton for Variety.

== Awards ==
- Berlin Film Festival:Teddy Award for Best Documentary
- GLAAD Media Award: GLAAD Media Award for Outstanding Documentary (nominee)
- Vancouver Film Festival: Best Documentary Winner
