= Westler =

1985 film

- German DVD cover
- Written by: Egbert Hörmann, Wieland Speck
- Directed by: Wieland Speck
- Starring: Sigurd Rachman, Rainer Strecker and Andy Lucas
- Country of origin: West Germany
- Original language: German

Production
- Running time: 94 minutes

Original release
- Release: 28 May 1987

Westler is a 1985 film originally produced for West German television and later released in cinema. It was directed by Wieland Speck and broadcast on ZDF.

== Synopsis ==
Felix is visited in West Berlin by an American friend from Los Angeles. The two make a day trip to East Berlin where they meet Thomas. Thomas and Felix fall in love but are divided by the Wall, much like all of Germany at the time. Felix tries to keep their relationship strong by making regular visits to Thomas in the East, but this raises the suspicions of the East German authorities. Eventually, Thomas seeks to flee to West Germany by flying to Prague, where a Czech friend has arranged a contact with an escape helper.

== Background ==
Westler is noteworthy for its realistic portrayal of a gay relationship under difficult circumstances, as well as for having been filmed partly in East Berlin without permission from East German authorities.

== Cast ==
- Sigurd Rachman as Felix
- Rainer Strecker as Thomas
- Andy Lucas as Bruce
- Frank Rediess as Bernie
- Andreas Bernhardt as Jürgen
- Sasha Kogo as Elke
- Hans-Jürgen Punte as Lutze
- Zazie de Paris as night club singer
- Harry Baer as Customs officer
- Christoph Eichhorn as actor
- Jörg Uwe Dost as Guest at the bar
- Thomas Kretschmann as Soldier
- Georges Stamkowski as Pavel
- The Waltons as the Band
  - Martin Zastrow as Band member
  - Engelbert Rehm as Band member
- Andrew Kelner as little child

== Awards ==
- Max Ophüls Festival, Audience Award, 1985
- San Francisco International Gay & Lesbian Film Festival, Audience Award, 1986
- Torino International Gay & Lesbian Film Festival, the Festival's Plate, 1987

== Reception ==
The film gained a Rotten Tomatoes rating of 50% in audience ratings.

- Helmut Schödel in Die Zeit said "… secretly must be filmed, secretly loved … it's about love, not about truth … I'm excited …"
- Encyclopedia of International Film: "A film about one in the multiple sense, love between the systems"; He tries to describe the Berlin Wall not only as an obstacle between people and political blocs, but also as a borderline between the Old and New World. "
- Uwe Witiatock, from Frankfurter Allgemeine Zeitung said "Partially without official filming permission and therefore filmed with a hidden camera, the divided city of Berlin has an unreal, foreign atmosphere, as if we were in Hong Kong or Singapore. You feel like being in the role of a visitor to a zoo, marveling at the conditions under which beings live in a completely different world."
- taz: "The love story between the young men is extremely pleasant, unobtrusive and unimaginably self-evident. Partially filmed with a hidden camera on original DDR locations, Westler is one of the few German productions that is worthwhile!"
