= Manfred Salzgeber =

German actor and film producer (1943–1994)

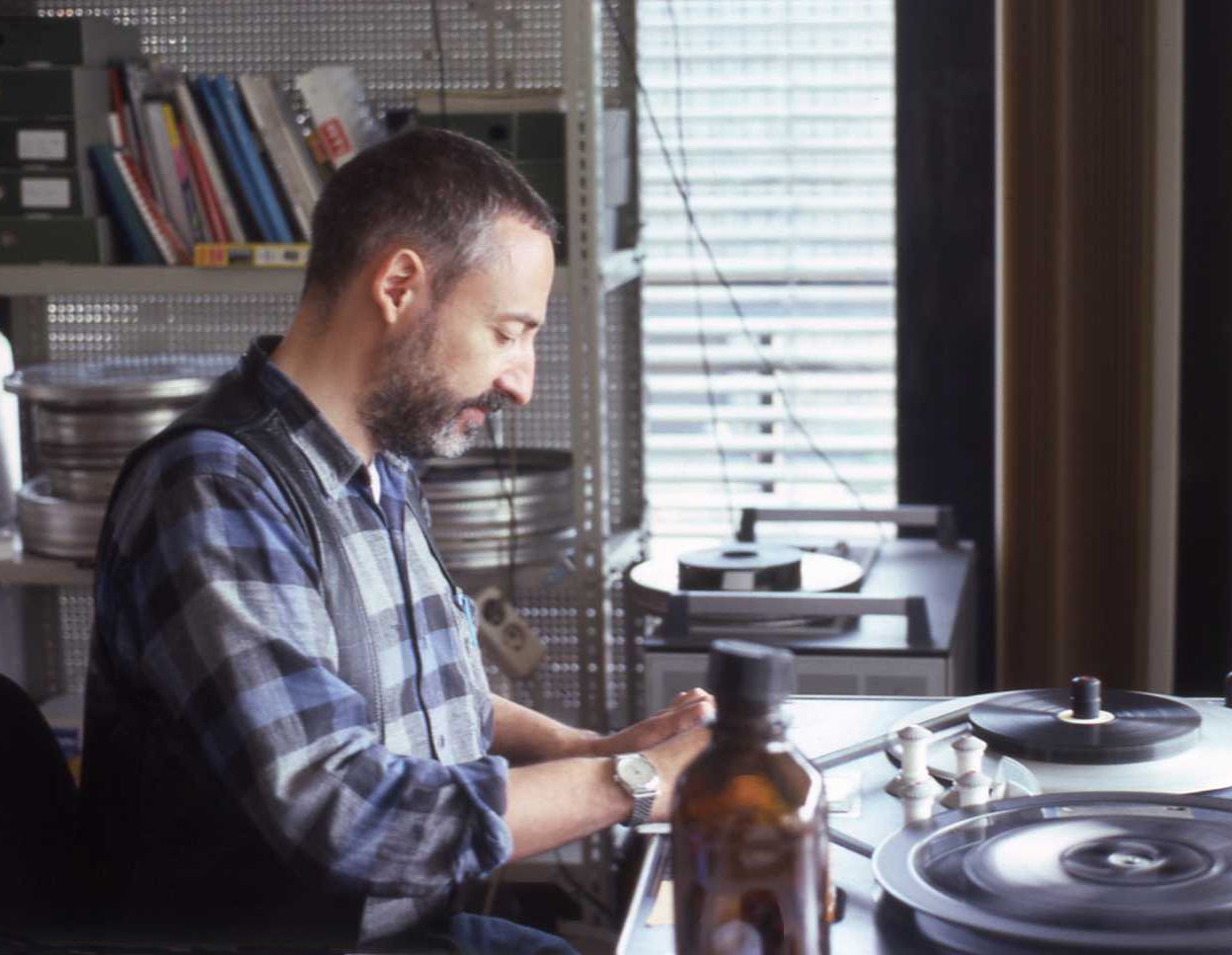

Manfred Salzgeber (10 January 1943 in Łódź - 12 August 1994 in Berlin) was a German actor and film producer. He was director of the "Sektion Panorama" at the Internationales Filmfestspiel Berlin. He was a co-founder of the Internationales Forum des Jungen Films and founded the film company edition manfred salzgeber.

== Biography ==
Salzgeber was born in Litzmannstadt (Łódź) in 1943 and was raised in Stuttgart-Rohr. After training as a book dealer, he moved to Berlin in 1965. Openly gay, he was an important LGBT activist in Germany. Together with Wieland Speck, he worked to advance LGBT themes in German film.

In 1970, Salzgeber acted in the film It Is Not the Homosexual Who Is Perverse, But the Society in Which He Lives, directed by Rosa von Praunheim. This film had a profound influence on German LGBT activism and society. During his entire lifetime, Salzgeber promoted LGBT films. Together with Wieland Speck he founded the Teddy Award in Berlin in 1987. This award is the oldest international award for LGBT films. In 1985, Salzgeber started his film company, edition manfred salzgeber. The company is still active in Berlin. Salzgeber died on August 12, 1994, of complications due to AIDS.
