= Kelmti Horra =

Studio album by Emel Mathlouthi
- Released: January 24, 2012
- Label: World Village

Kelmti Horra (Arabic: كلمتي حرة, "My Word is Free") is the debut studio album by Tunisian protest singer Emel Mathlouthi. It was released on January 24, 2012. The title track was written by Tunisian writer Amine al-Ghozzi and became an important protest song in the Tunisian and Egyptian revolutions.

Kelmti Horra was reissued for the first time on vinyl in 2022 to celebrate its 10-year anniversary. The reissue which was also out on CD, included bonus tracks.

== Reception ==
The album was received positively. Neil Spencer of The Guardian called Mathlouthi "a powerful new voice" and "a world diva with a difference", describing the album as twisting together "Arabic roots with western flavours" including rock and trip-hop.

Music News describes Kelmti Horra as "a work of haunting and melodramatic beauty" with "an intoxicating and intriguing sound". Mathlouthi was called the "Voice of Tunisian Revolution" after the release of the song.

== Track listing ==
Original track listing
No.	Title	Writer(s)	Length
1.	"Houdou'on (The Calm)"	Emel Mathlouthi	5:31
2.	"Ma Ikit (Not Found)"	Emel Mathlouthi	3:57
3.	"Dhalem (Tyrant)"	Emel Mathlouthi	3:55
4.	"Stranger"	Emel Mathlouthi	4:12
5.	"Ya Tounes Ya Meskina (Poor Tunisia)"	Emel Mathlouthi	4:46
6.	"Ethnia Twila (The Road is Long)"	Emel Mathlouthi	8:23
7.	"Kelmti Horra (My Word is Free)"	Amin al-Ghozzi	6:29
8.	"Dfina (Burial)"	Emel Mathlouthi	6:22
9.	"Hinama (When)"	Emel Mathlouthi	5:28
10.	"Yezzi (Enough)"	Emel Mathlouthi	7:14

== Personnel ==
- Emel Mathlouthi, guitar, lead vocals and backing vocals
- Amine alghozzi, lyrics
- Zied Zouari, violin
- Séverine Morfin, viola
- Valentin Ceccaldi, cello
- Imed Alibi, djembe, shakers
- Vanesa Garcia, bombo
- Jonathan Giovannelli, balafon
- Sana Sassi, backing vocals
- Jelila Bouraoui, backing vocals
- Christine Audat, backing vocals
- Amine Metani, backing vocals
- Ahmed Nouisser, backing vocals
