= Jochen Hick =

German film director and producer

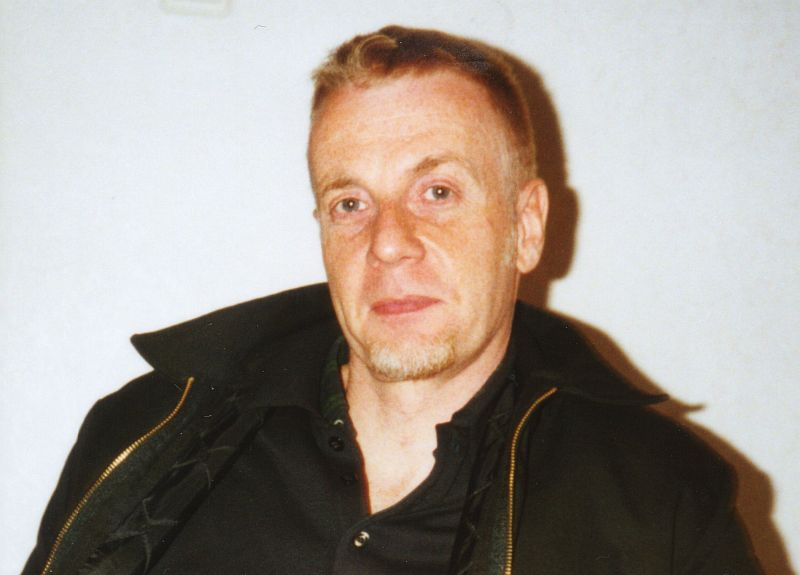
Jochen Hick on a film festival at Perm, 2004

Jochen Hick (born April 2, 1960, in Darmstadt) is a German film director and producer of mainly independent feature and documentary films, also specialising in LGBT subjects. In 1994 he founded the film and TV production company GALERIA ALASKA PRODUCTIONS, based in Hamburg and Berlin. He worked and produced for several production companies and TV channels and contributed to TV documentary programs such as ARD-Exclusiv or SPIEGEL TV Reportage. 2007-2010 he is as well editor-in-chief, head of program acquisitions and co-programming director of TIMM, the first TV channel for gay male audiences in German speaking countries, which has been on the air since November 1, 2008.

His 2008 documentary East/West – Sex & Politics concerns Nikolai Alekseev's attempts to organise the 2007 Moscow Pride event.

The 2017 documentary Mein wunderbares West-Berlin (My Wonderful West Berlin), covers gay experiences in West Berlin between the mid-1940s and the late 1980s and beyond. The film premiered in February 2017 at the 67th Berlin International Film Festival (aka Berlinale). His most recent film is Queer Exile Berlin (2023), being the third part of a trilogy about queer life in Berlin (which also includes Out in East Berlin of 2013.

Jochen Hick's feature films have been shown at many international film festivals and have been included in the official program of the Berlinale a total of twelve times since 1992. Hick was also co-initiator and founding board member of the documentary film platform docfilm42, which first went online in 2019.

== Filmography ==
- Queer Exile Berlin (2023)
- Mein wunderbares West-Berlin (My Wonderful West Berlin) (2017)
- The GDR Complex (2016)
- Out in East Berlin – Lesbians & Gays in the GDR (2013)
- DDR unterm Regenbogen (2011) (TV)
- The Good American (2009)
- East/West – Sex & Politics (2008)
- Deutschland – Ein Herbstmärchen (2007)
- Hallelujah! (2006)
- Rainbow's End (2006)
- Am Ende des Regenbogens (2005) (TV)
- Cycles of Porn: Sex/Life in L.A., Part 2 (2005)
- Talk Straight: The World of Rural Queers (2003)
- No One Sleeps (2000)
- Sex/Life in L.A. (1998)
- Menmaniacs – The Legacy of Leather (1995)
- Welcome to the Dome (1992)
- Via Appia (1990)
- Gerd Hansen, 55 (1987)
- Moon Over Pittsburgh (1985)
- Die Gedaechtnisluecke (1982)

== Awards ==
- The 2003 Teddy Award for Best Documentary at the 53rd Berlin International Film Festival for Talk Straight: The World Of Rural Queers.
