= Nothing Has Ever Happened Here =

- Directed by: Ayat Najafi
- Written by: Ayat Najafi
- Starring: Shoja Azari; Sanam Enayati; Kambiz Hosseini; Artin Keihani; Kathreen Khavari; Paul Niebanck; Kim Yaged
- Cinematography: Koohyar Kalari
- Edited by: Schokofeh Kamiz, Faraz Fesharaki, Sarah-Christin Peter
- Music by: Mohammad Reza Mortazavi
- Release date: May 31, 2016
- Running time: 21 minutes
- Countries: Germany; Iran
- Languages: Persian; English

Nothing Has Ever Happened Here (Persian: اینجا هرگز هیچ چیز رخ نداده است) is a 2016 Iranian documentary film written and directed by Ayat Najafi.
