= Talk Straight: The World of Rural Queers =

- Ich kenn keinen - Allein unter Heteros
- Directed by: Jochen Hick
- Screenplay by: Jochen Hick
- Produced by: Jochen Hick
- Cinematography: Jochen Hick; Florian Koehler; Jan Tilman Schade; Klaus Wagner
- Edited by: Florian Koehler
- Release date: 2003
- Running time: 99 min
- Country: Germany
- Language: German

Talk Straight: The World of Rural Queers, originally titled Ich kenn keinen! - Allein unter Heteros, is a 2003 German documentary and semi-biographical film written and directed by Jochen Hick. The film is set in Swabia, Germany, and follows the lives of four gay men, Hartmut, Richard, Stefan and Uwe.

== Plot ==
The film explores the men's experiences and includes interviews with locals about how they feel about homosexuality.

== Context ==
At the time that the film was written, homophobia had begun to substantially diminish in cities and metropolitan areas. Many German public figures at the time were beginning to openly identify as homosexual, and homosexuality was becoming generally more accepted in Germany. Gay men who lived in rural areas, by contrast, were more likely to face discrimination. Homophobic slurs remained in common use in rural areas, a fact which the film highlighted for many viewers. Hick succeeded in providing what would later become a historically significant insight into the suffering of gay men living in rural Germany.

== Reception ==
Dennis Harvey of Variety wrote, "Funny, poignant and charming docu belies English title’s implied narrow focus to deliver a much looser appreciation of some quirky, semi-isolated gay men, the still largely homo-oblivious rural world they live in, various social networks/personal escape valves and life in general".

The film won the Teddy Award in 2003 for Best Documentary at the Berlin International Film Festival.
