= Ayat Najafi =

Iranian film director and screenwriter (born 1976)

- آیت نجفی
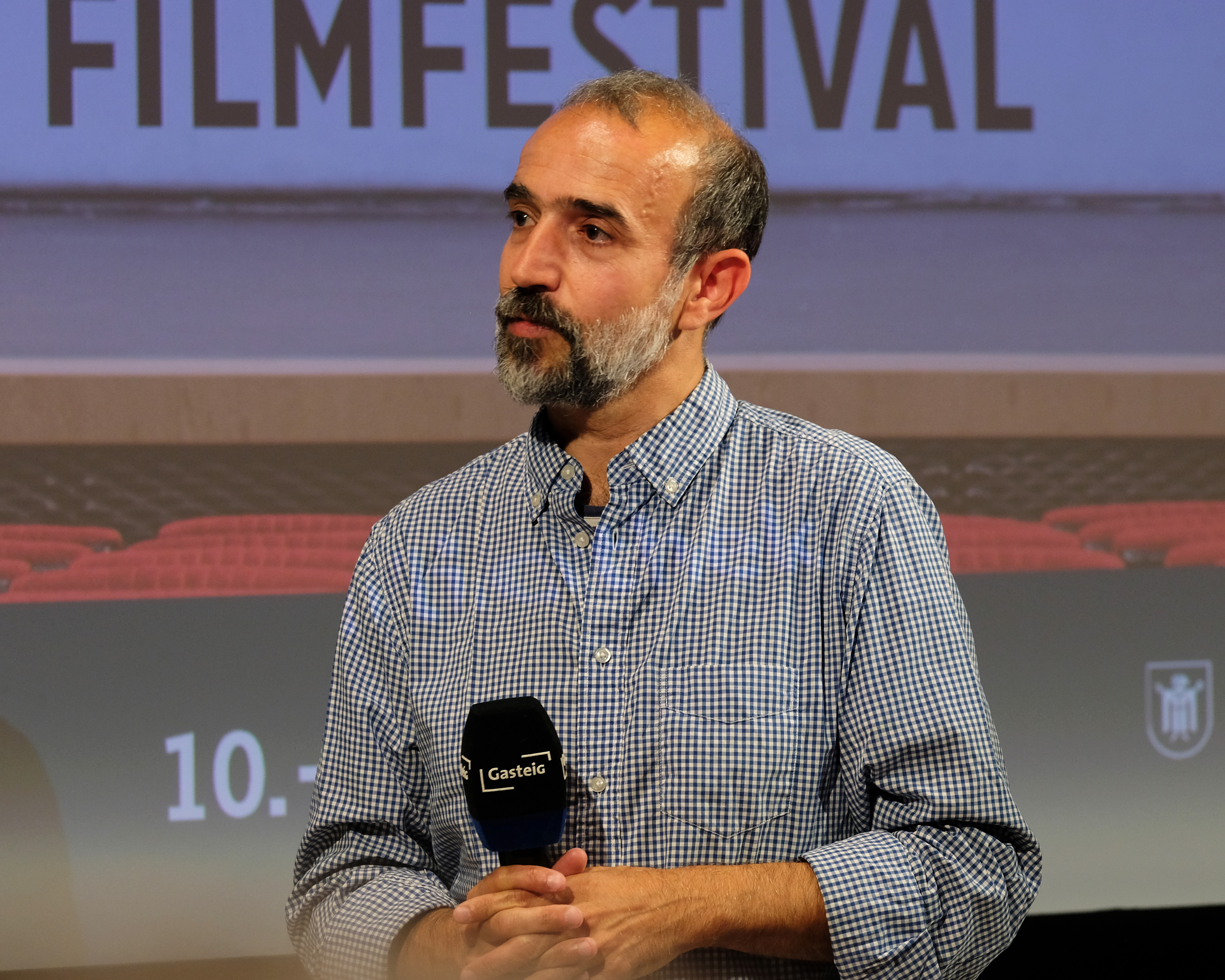
- Najafi in 2024
- Born: 23 September 1976 (age 49); Tehran, Iran
- Education: Art and Architecture University
- Occupations: Film director, screenwriter, film producer
- Years active: 1985–present
- Notable work: No Land's Song; Football Under Cover

Ayat Najafi (Persian: آیت نجفی,, born 23 September 1976) is an Iranian film director and screenwriter. He has received many international awards from the Berlin International Film Festival and Outfest for "Football Under Cover" and also Montreal World Film Festival for No Land's Song.

== Life and career ==
Ayat Najafi was born in Tehran in 1976.

He established a youth theatre company in college in 1995, while getting professional experience as an intern and participating in several workshops, with masters and professors of Iranian theatre. He participated in a number of different theatrical productions as an assistant director, author, actor, and set designer. Since 2000, he realized his own directorial work.

In 2003, he established the Arta Atelier, focusing on an interdisciplinary, multimedia approach to theater, as well as experimental short and documentary film. Ayat participated in at Berlinale Talent Campus, 2005, with his short film, “Move It” (2004). “Football Under Cover”, his 1st feature documentary, co-directed by David Assmann, premiered at the International Berlin Film Festival, 2008, and has participated in several other festivals, winning several awards, such as Teddy award for best documentary, Berlinale 2008 and Prix Europa TV IRIS.

No Land's Song his 2nd feature documentary premiered at the Montréal World Film Festival, 2014, and has shown in more than 50 Festivals around the world, winning several awards, such as the public award for Best Documentary, Montréal World Film Festival. Best documentary, Gijon International Film Festival. Youth Jury Award, Dok Leipzig. Nestor Almendros Award for Courage in Filmmaking, Human Rights Watch Film Festival - New York. He was a fellow at the International Research Center, Free University of Berlin and at the Exzellenzcluster, Kulturelle Grundlagen von Integration, University of Constance where he presented his theater production, “Stories of Women with Mustaches and Men in Skirts”. “Lady Tehran”, his second theater production in Germany with an international cast and crew, was performed in Berlin in 2009.

In 2011, he followed with “Rasht- City of Women”, and 2012 with “Pakistan (does not) Exist”, also performed in Berlin. Ayat Najafi was a jury member at various festivals, including Amnesty International Jury at the Berlinale in 2012 and international jury at dokumentART- European Film Festival for Documentaries 2014. He is also author of numerous articles and essays for magazines, newspapers and web sites in Iran and Germany. He currently lives in Berlin and Tehran.

== Filmography ==
Year	Film	Credited as				Notes
Year	Film	Director	Producer	Writer	Actor	Notes
2016	Nothing Has Ever Happened Here	Yes	Yes	Yes	No	
2014	No Land's Song	Yes	No	Yes	No	
2008	Football Under Cover	Yes	No	Yes	No	
2005	Move It	Yes	Yes	Yes	No	
1987	Avicenna	No	No	No	Yes	

== Theaterography ==
- Sleepy Noon, Tehran 2001
- The Seagull, Tehran 2002
- The Armed Robbery of Potatoes, Tehran 2003
- Ferdowsi, Saddam Hossein and the Ants Pried in the Empty City, Tehran 2004
- Moments Before Tragedy, Tehran 2005
- Stories of Women with Mustaches and Men in Skirts, Constance, Germany 2009
- Tehran Banou: Lady Teheran, Berlin 2009
- Rasht – Stadt der Frauen, Berlin. 2011
