= List of LGBTQ-related films of 2018 =

This is a list of lesbian, gay, bisexual, transgender or queer-related films released in 2018. It contains theatrically released films that deal with important gay, lesbian, bisexual, transgender or queer characters or issues and may have same-sex romance or relationships as a plot device.

== Films ==
| Title | Director | Country | Genre | Cast | Notes | Ref |
|---|---|---|---|---|---|---|
| 1985 | Yen Tan | United States | Drama | Cory Michael Smith, Virginia Madsen, Michael Chiklis, Aidan Langford, Jamie Chung | Expansion of Tan's short film of the same name from 2016 | |
| 5 Weddings | Namrata Singh Gujral | United States; India; Canada | Drama | Nargis Fakhri, Rajkummar Rao, Bo Derek | | |
| Alex Strangelove | Craig Johnson | United States | Comedy | Daniel Doheny, Antonio Marizale, Madeline Weinstein | | |
| Andið eðlilega | Ísold Uggadóttir | Iceland; Sweden; Belgium | Drama | Kristín Þóra Haraldsdóttir, Babetida Sadjo, Patrik Nökkvi Pétursson | | |
| El Angel (El Ángel) | Luis Ortega | Argentina | Drama | Lorenzo Ferro, Chino Darín, Mercedes Morán, Daniel Fanego, Luis Gnecco, Peter Lanzani, Cecilia Roth, Malena Villa | Inspired by the true story of Argentine serial killer Carlos Robledo Puch | |
| L'Animale | Katharina Mückstein | Austria | Drama | Sophie Stockinger, Kathrin Resetarits, Dominik Warta, Julia Franz Richter, Jack Hofer, Dominic Marcus Singer, Simon Morzé, Stefan Pohl | | |
| Assassination Nation | Sam Levinson | United States | Comedy, Thriller | Odessa Young, Suki Waterhouse, Hari Nef, Abra, Bella Thorne, Bill Skarsgård, Joel McHale, Maude Apatow, Colman Domingo, Anika Noni Rose, Kelvin Harrison Jr., Lukas Gage, Cody Christian, Danny Ramirez, Noah Galvin, Jennifer Morrison, J. D. Evermore, Cullen Moss, Susan Misner, Joe Chrest, Kathryn Erbe | | |
| Believer | Don Argott | United States | Documentary | Dan Reynolds (singer with Imagine Dragons), Aja Volkman (Dan Reynolds wife), Ben McKee (Bassist with Imagine Dragons), Daniel Platzman (Drummer with Imagine Dragons), Wayne Sermon (Lead guitarist with Imagine Dragons), Tyler Glenn (singer with band Neon Trees), Savannah Skyler | Dan helped organize the charity LOVELOUD Festival in Orem, Utah in support of Utah LGBTQ youth, to stop teen suicides | |
| Benjamin | Simon Amstell | United Kingdom | Comedy-drama | Colin Morgan, Anna Chancellor, Jack Rowan | | |
| Blowin' Up | Stephanie Wang-Breal | United States | Documentary | Susan Liu and Toko Serita (first Japanese American female judge in New York) | A group of women are trying change the way women arrested for prostitution are prosecuted in the US | |
| Bohemian Rhapsody | Dexter Fletcher | United States; United Kingdom | Drama | Rami Malek, Lucy Boynton, Gwilym Lee, Ben Hardy, Joseph Mazzello (credited as Joe Mazzello), Allen Leech, Aidan Gillen, Tom Hollander, Mike Myers, Aaron McCusker | Biopic of Freddie Mercury | |
| Boy Erased | Joel Edgerton | United States | Drama | Lucas Hedges, Russell Crowe, Nicole Kidman, Joel Edgerton, Joe Alwyn, Xavier Dolan, Troye Sivan | Released on November 2 | |
| Bulbul Can Sing | Rima Das | India | Drama | Arnali Das, Bonita Thakuriya, Manoranjoan Das | | |
| Call Her Ganda | PJ Raval | United States | Documentary | Naomi Fontanos, Jennifer Laude (archive footage), Julita Laude (Jennifer's Mother), Virginia Lacsa Suarez, Meredith Talusan | Follows the death of Jennifer Laude, a Filipina trans woman, who was brutally murdered by a U.S. Marine and subsequent trial | |
| Can You Ever Forgive Me? | Marielle Heller | United States | Drama | Melissa McCarthy, Richard E. Grant | Based on the confessional memoir of the same name by Lee Israel | |
| Carmen & Lola (Carmen y Lola) | Arantxa Echevarria | Spain | Drama | Moreno Borja, Carolina Yuste, Rosy Rodríguez, Zaira Morales, Rafaela León | | |
| Cassandro the Exotico! | Marie Losier | France | Documentary | Saúl Armendáriz | | |
| Colette | Wash Westmoreland | United States; United Kingdom; Hungary | Drama | Keira Knightley, Dominic West, Eleanor Tomlinson, Aiysha Hart, Fiona Shaw, Denise Gough, Robert Pugh, Rebecca Root, Jake Graf, Julian Wadham | based upon the life of the French novelist of the same name | |
| Consequences (Posledice) | Darko Štante | Slovenia | Drama | Matej Zemljič, Timon Šturbej, Gašper Markun | | |
| Contra-Internet: Jubilee 2033 | Zach Blas | United States; United Kingdom | Drama, Short | Susanne Sachße (billed as Susanne Sachsse), Dany Naierman, Lindsay Hicks, Fusako Shiotani, Cassils | 29 mins long | |
| Daddy Issues | Amara Cash | United States | Drama | Madison Lawlor, Montana Manning, Andrew Pifko | | |
| The Death and Life of John F. Donovan | Xavier Dolan | Canada | Drama | Kit Harington, Natalie Portman, Jacob Tremblay, Susan Sarandon | | |
| Diamantino | Gabriel Abrantes, Daniel Schmidt | Portugal | Drama | Carloto Cotta | | |
| Disobedience | Sebastián Lelio | United Kingdom; Ireland; United States | Drama | Rachel Weisz, Rachel McAdams, Alessandro Nivola, Anton Lesser | Based on the novel of the same name by Naomi Alderman; released on April 28 (Premiered at 2017 Toronto International Film Festival) | |
| Duck Butter | Miguel Arteta | United States | Comedy-drama | Alia Shawkat, Laia Costa, Mae Whitman, Hong Chau, Kate Berlant, Lindsay Burdge, Kumail Nanjiani, Mark Duplass, Jay Duplass, Jenny O'Hara | | |
| Euphoria (Euforia) | Valeria Golino | Italy | Drama | Riccardo Scamarcio, Valerio Mastandrea | | |
| Evening Shadows | Sridhar Rangayan | India | Drama | Mona Ambegaonkar, Anant Mahadevan (credited as Ananth Narayan Mahadevan) | | |
| Every Day | Michael Sucsy | United States | Romance, fantasy | Angourie Rice | A teenager boy falls in love with a traveling spirit who experiences every day in the body of a different teenager. | |
| Evidentiary Bodies | Barbara Hammer | United States | Short drama | | 9 mins long | |
| The Favourite | Yorgos Lanthimos | Ireland; United Kingdom; United States | Drama | Olivia Colman, Emma Stone, Rachel Weisz, Nicholas Hoult and Joe Alwyn | | |
| Flawless | Tal Granit, Sharon Maymon | Israel | Drama | Stav Strashko, Netsanet Mekonnen, Noam Lugasy, Asi Levi | | |
| Frig | Antony Hickling | France | French art film | Biño Sauitzvy, Gaëtan Vettier, Christine Mingo, Thomas Laroppe | | |
| The Fruit Machine | Sarah Fodey | Canada | Documentary | Interviewees: Michelle Douglas, John Ibbitson, John Sawatsky, Gary Kinsman | film profiles the "fruit machine", a controversial device used by the Canadian government in the 1950s and 1960s in an attempt to identify LGBT employees and disqualify them from the civil service | |
| Game Girls | Alina Skrzeszewska | France; Germany | Documentary | Teri Rogers and her girlfriend Tiahna | Follows a relationship in Los Angeles' Skid Row, aka the "homeless capital of the U.S." | |
| Garbage | Q | India | Drama | Trimala Adhikari | | |
| Genesis (Genèse) | Philippe Lesage | Canada | Drama | Théodore Pellerin, Noée Abita, Pier-Luc Funk | | |
| Giant Little Ones | Keith Behrman | Canada | Drama | Kyle MacLachlan, Maria Bello, Josh Wiggins, Darren Mann, Hailey Kittle, Kiandra Madeira, Carson MacCormac, Taylor Hickson, Niamh Wilson | | |
| Girl | Lukas Dhont | Belgium | Drama | Victor Polster | | |
| The Gospel of Eureka | Michael Palmieri, Donal Mosher | United States | Documentary | Archive footage of Anita Bryant and narrator Mx Justin Vivian Bond | About the lives of LGBT individuals and evangelical Christians in Eureka Springs, Arkansas | |
| The Happy Prince | Rupert Everett | United Kingdom | Drama | Rupert Everett, Colin Firth, Colin Morgan, Emily Watson, Tom Wilkinson, Anna Chancellor, Edwin Thomas, Béatrice Dalle, Julian Wadham, John Standing | Biopic of Oscar Wilde | |
| Hard Paint (Tinta Bruta) | Marcio Reolon, Filipe Matzembacher | Brazil | Drama | Shico Menegat, Bruno Fernandes, Guega Peixoto, Sandra Dani, Frederico Vasques | | |
| The Harvesters | Etienne Kallos | South Africa | Drama | Alex van Dyk, Brent Vermeulen, Juliana Venter, Morné Visser, Erika Wessels, Benre Labuschachne, Danny Keough, Roxana Kerdachi | | |
| Hearts Beat Loud | Brett Haley | United States | Drama | Nick Offerman, Kiersey Clemons, Toni Collette, Sasha Lane, Ted Danson, Blythe Danner | | |
| The Heiresses (Las Herederas) | Marcelo Martinessi | Paraguay | Drama | Ana Brun, Margarita Irún, Ana Ivanova, María Martins, Alicia Guerra, Yverá Zayas | | |
| House of Hummingbird (Beol-sae) | Kim Bo-ra | South Korea | Drama | Park Ji-hu, Kim Sae-byuk, Lee Seung-yeon, Jung In-gi, Son Sang-yeon, Bak Su-yeon | | |
| Hurricane Bianca 2: From Russia with Hate | Matt Kugelman | United States | Comedy | Bianca Del Rio, Rachel Dratch, Katya Zamolodchikova | | |
| Ideal Home | Andrew Fleming | United States | Comedy-drama | Steve Coogan, Paul Rudd, Alison Pill | | |
| I Am Jonas (Jonas) | Christophe Charrier | France | Drama | Félix Maritaud, Nicolas Bauwens, Tommy-Lee Baïk, Aure Atika | | |
| Jonathan Agassi Saved My Life | Tomer Heymann | Israel | Documentary | Jonathan Agassi, Michael Lucas | | |
| JT Leroy | Justin Kelly | United States | Drama | Laura Dern, Kristen Stewart, Diane Kruger, Jim Sturgess, Kelvin Harrison Jr., Courtney Love | | |
| A Kid Like Jake | Silas Howard | United States | Drama | Claire Danes, Jim Parsons, Octavia Spencer, Priyanka Chopra | Screenplay by Daniel Pearle, based on his stage play of the same name | |
| Kingsway | Bruce Sweeney | Canada | Comedy, drama | Gabrielle Rose, Jeff Gladstone, Camille Sullivan | | |
| Knife+Heart (Un couteau dans le cœur) | Yann Gonzalez | France | Drama | Vanessa Paradis, Kate Moran, Nicolas Maury, Noé Hernández | | |
| Lizzie | Craig William Macneill | United States | Biography, thriller | Chloë Sevigny, Kristen Stewart, Jay Huguley | Based on the true story of Lizzie Borden | |
| Love Blooms (L'Amour debout) | Michaël Dacheux | France | Drama | Paul Delbreil, Adèle Csech, Samuel Fasse, Jean-Christophe Marti, Thibaut Destouches, Shirley Mirande, Pascal Cervo, Françoise Lebrun | | |
| Love, Scott | Laura Marie Wayne | Canada | Documentary | Scott Jones | | |
| Love, Simon | Greg Berlanti | United States | Drama | Nick Robinson, Keiynan Lonsdale, Jennifer Garner, Josh Duhamel | Based on the young adult novel Simon vs. the Homo Sapiens Agenda by Becky Albertalli | |
| Making Montgomery Clift | Robert Clift; Hillary Demmon | United States | Documentary | Jack Larson, Patricia Bosworth | | |
| M/M | Drew Lint | Canada; Germany | Drama | Antoine Lahaie, Nicolas Maxim Endlicher | | |
| Marilyn | Martín Rodríguez Redondo | Argentina; Chile | Drama | Walter Rodríguez, Catalina Saavedra, Germán de Silva | | |
| Mario | Marcel Gisler | Switzerland | Romance, drama | Max Hubacher, Aaron Altaras, Jessy Moravec | | |
| McQueen | Ian Bonhôte | United States | Documentary | Alexander McQueen | | |
| The Miseducation of Cameron Post | Desiree Akhavan | United States | Drama | Chloë Grace Moretz, Jennifer Ehle, John Gallagher Jr., Sasha Lane, Forrest Goodluck, Emily Skeggs | Based on the novel of the same name by Emily M. Danforth | |
| Mom + Mom (Mamma + Mamma) | Karole Di Tommaso | Italy | Drama | Linda Caridi, Maria Roveran | | |
| Mr. SOUL! | Sam Pollard; Melissa Haizlip | United States | Documentary | Ellis Haizlip | | |
| My Best Friend (Mi Mejor Amigo) | Martín Deus | Argentina | Drama | Angelo Mutti Spinetta, Lautaro Rodríguez | | |
| The Night of All Nights (Die Nacht der Nächte) | Yasemin Samderelli | Germany | Documentary | Hildegard Rotthäuser, Heinz Rotthäuser, Kamala Nagarayya, Hampana Nagarayya, Shigeko Sugihara, Isao Sugihara, Norman MacArthur, Bill Novak | | |
| Njan Marykutty | Ranjith Sankar | India | Comedy, Drama | Jayasurya, Jewel Mary | The first Malayalam film to feature a trans woman as a protagonist. | |
| Obscuro Barroco | Evangelia Kranioti | France; Greece | Documentary | Luana Muniz | | |
| Octavio Is Dead! | Sook-Yin Lee | Canada | Supernatural drama | Sarah Gadon, Rosanna Arquette, Raoul Trujillo | | |
| One of the Guys (Ti-Gars) | Doris Buttignol | Canada; France | Documentary | Vincent Lamarre | | |
| The Orphan (O Órfão) | Carolina Markowicz | Brazil | Short drama | Kauan Alavrenga | | |
| Papi Chulo | John Butler | Ireland; United States | Comedy-drama | Matt Bomer, Alejandro Patino | | |
| A Paris Education | Jean Paul Civeyrac | France | Drama | Andranic Manet, Diane Rouxel, Jenna Thiam, Gonzague Van Bervesseles, Corentin Fila | | |
| The Pillar of Salt (Tuzdan Kaide) | Burak Çevik | Turkey | Drama | Zinnure Türe, Dila Yumurtaci, Esme Madra, Banu Fotocan, Elit Iscan, Nihal G. Koldas, Reyhan Özdilek, Ayse Demirel, Bahar Çevik, Nazan Kesal, Nalan Kuruçim | | |
| Postcards from London | Steve Mclean | United Kingdom | Drama | Harris Dickinson, Richard Durden, Jonah Hauer-King, Alessandro Cimadmore, Leonardo Salerni, Raphael Desprez, Silas Carson | | |
| Prisoner of Society | Rati Tsiteladze | Georgia | Documentary, short | Adelina (transgender woman) | 16 mins long | |
| Rafiki | Wanuri Kahiu | Kenya | Drama | Charlie Karumi, Samantha Mugatsia, Sheila Munyiva | | |
| Red Cow (Para Aduma) | Tsivia Barkai | Israel | Drama | Avigail Kovari | | |
| River's Edge | Isao Yukisada | Japan | Drama | Fumi Nikaidō, Ryo Yoshizawa, Shūhei Uesegi, Sumire, Shiori Doi, Aoi Morikawa | Based on a manga of the same name by Kyoko Okazaki | |
| Sauvage (Savage or Wild) | Camille Vidal-Naquet | France | Drama | Félix Maritaud, Eric Bernard, Nicolas Dibla, Philippe Ohrel, Pavle Dragas, Mehdi Boudina, Azir Mustafic, Hassim Mohamed Saleh | | |
| Shakedown | Leilah Weinraub | United States | Documentary | Egypt, Jazmyne, Junior, Mahogany, Ronnie-Ron, Slow-Wine, Keyonna Taylor | | |
| The Silk and the Flame | Jordan Schiele | United States | Documentary | Yao, Yao's father and Yao's mother | | |
| Skies Are Not Just Blue | Lysandre Cosse-Tremblay | Canada | Short, Documentary | | | |
| Sorry Angel (Plaire aimer et courir vite) | Christophe Honoré | France | Drama | Vincent Lacoste, Pierre Deladonchamps, Denis Podalydès | | |
| Splinters | Thom Fitzgerald | Canada | Drama | Sofia Banzhaf, Shelley Thompson, Callum Dunphy, Mary-Colin Chisholm | Adaptation of the play of the same name by Lee-Anne Poole | |
| Studio 54 | Matt Tyrnauer | United States | Documentary | Ian Schrager and Steve Rubell | | |
| Suicide Squad: Hell to Pay | Sam Liu | United States | Animation, Action, Fantasy | (Voices); Christian Slater, Billy Brown, Liam McIntyre, Kristin Bauer van Straten, Gideon Emery, Tara Strong, Vanessa Williams | | |
| T.R.A.P. | Manque La Banca | Argentina | Short | | 16 mins long | |
| Tell It to the Bees | Annabel Jankel | United Kingdom | Drama | Anna Paquin, Holliday Grainger, Emun Elliott, Kate Dickie | Based on the novel of the same name by Fiona Shaw | |
| Third Wedding (Troisièmes noces) | David Lambert | Belgium, Luxembourg, Canada | Comedy-drama | Bouli Lanners, Rachel Mwanza, Eric Kabongo | | |
| Touch Me Not | Adina Pintilie | Romania | Drama | Laura Benson, Tómas Lemarquis, Dirk Lange | | |
| Tranny Fag (Bixa Travesty) | Claudia Priscilla, Kika Goifman | Brazil | Documentary | Linn da Quebrada (transgender Brazilian musician and activist) | | |
| Vice | Adam McKay | United States | Biography | Christian Bale, Amy Adams, Steve Carell, Sam Rockwell, Justin Kirk, Tyler Perry, Alison Pill, Lily Rabe, Jesse Plemons | Biopic of former U.S. Vice President Dick Cheney | |
| Vita and Virginia | Chanya Button | United Kingdom | Drama | Gemma Arterton, Elizabeth Debicki, Isabella Rossellini, Rupert Penry-Jones, Peter Ferdinando | Co-written by Eileen Atkins, based on her stage play of the same name | |
| We the Animals | Jerimiah Zagar | United States | Drama | Evan Rosado, Raúl Castillo, Sheila Vand | Based on the novel by Justin Torres | |
| What Keeps You Alive | Colin Minihan | Canada | Thriller | Hannah Emily Anderson, Brittany Allen, Martha MacIsaac | | |
| Where the Summer Goes (Onde o verão vai) | David Pinheiro Vicente | Portugal | Drama, short | Miguel Amorim, Joana Peres, Rodrigo Tomás, Joana Petiz, André Simões, Rodolfo Major | 21 mins long | |
| Yours in Sisterhood | Irene Lusztig | United States | Documentary | Various women | | |
