= Yerba Buena Center for the Arts =

Art museum and event venue in California

Coordinates: 37.785389°N 122.402284°W

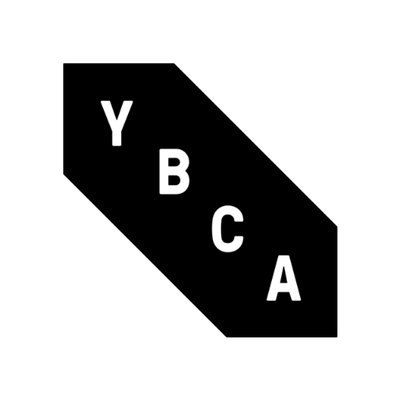

- Exterior of the YBCA Theater in 2016
- Established: 1993; 33 years ago
- Location: 701 Mission Street; San Francisco, California; 94103
- Type: Contemporary art museum and live event venue
- Employees: 65
- Website: ybca.org

Yerba Buena Center for the Arts (YBCA) is a multi-disciplinary contemporary arts center in San Francisco, California, United States. Located in Yerba Buena Gardens, YBCA features visual art, performance, and film/video that celebrates local, national, and international artists and the Bay Area's diverse communities. YBCA programs year-round in two landmark buildings—the Galleries and Forum by Japanese architect Fumihiko Maki and the adjacent Theater by American architect James Stewart Polshek and Todd Schliemann. Betti-Sue Hertz served as Curator from 2008 through 2015.

== History ==
The museum was conceived as part of a deal by mayor George Moscone with developers to "set aside land and funds for cultural institutions such as museums, exhibits, and theaters" for the redevelopment projects in South of Market, San Francisco. The museum was opened in 1993.

=== Community Focus ===
YBCA produces a triennial of Northern California art called Bay Area Now.

Sarah Hotchkiss states of the 2018 Bay Area Now 8, "It's so rare for the local art scene to see its own members getting large-scale institutional attention—while those artists are still alive—that Bay Area Now has come to occupy a hallowed role in the community."

In 2014 YBCA initiated the YBCA 100 list "honoring a hugely diverse group of artists, activists and leaders and celebrating a nationwide community of innovative and inspirational individuals and organizations."

In March 2021 YBCA partnered with San Francisco Arts Commission, San Francisco Grants for the Arts, and the San Francisco Human Rights Commission to launch a guaranteed income program. The pilot program would give $1,000 a month to 130 artists below certain income levels for six months, beginning in May 2021. It is paid through the Arts Impact Endowment established by Proposition E in 2018, which allocates 1.5% of the city's hotel tax to arts and cultural services. This follows similar programs in Stockton, Oakland, and Marin County to support artists during the COVID-19 pandemic in the United States.

=== 2024 protests ===
In 2024, YBCA galleries closed for a month following disruptions from an artist collective in the Bay Area 9 exhibit, in which artists altered their own works on display with messages in support of freedom for Palestinians and a ceasefire in the ongoing Israel-Gaza war. Organizers demanded that the museum remove all "Zionist Board members and funders" of YBCA, participate in the Palestinian Campaign for the Academic and Cultural Boycott of Israel, and not censor artists from solidarity statements. The museum had previously prevented artist Lukaza Branfman-Verissimo from displaying "Free Palestine" in an outdoor exhibition, and censored artist Jeff Cheung's intended mural featuring colors of the Palestinian flag. An open letter by current and former museum employees expressed solidarity with the artist collective. Interim CEO Sara Fenske Bahat resigned amid the backlash, and county supervisor Hillary Ronen called for a special hearing into the museum's continued closure. The exhibition re-opened with the artist alterations intact, accompanied by new signage.

== Activities ==
=== Music ===
Yerba Buena Center for the Arts embraces many musical genres and styles. Not only does the center provide a stage for Bay Area instrumental and vocal musicians and ensembles, it also offers a sampling of musical practices from all over the world. Along with solo performances, YBCA also has invited various musical projects to use its facilities, such as the tribute to composer Elliott Carter in 2008 and the Long Now Foundation in 2010. The connection between these various musical practices is the intent for social change through education provided by another culture or by creating a community around a purpose. Although month to month there are not many purely musical performances, music is often incorporated with other performing arts, such as dance or theater.

=== Fine arts ===
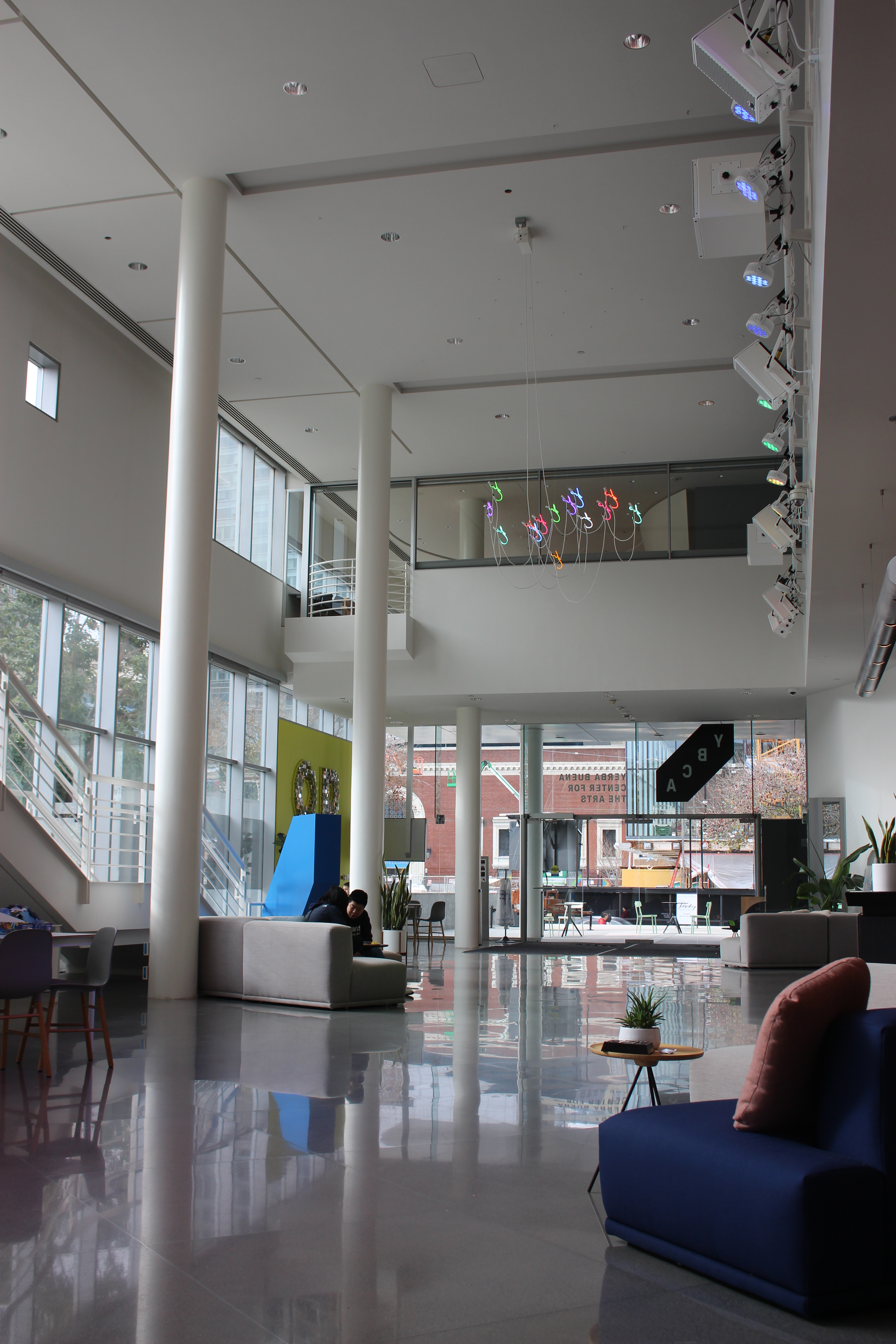
Lobby of the Yerba Buena Center for the Arts in February 2020

In addition to being a venue for musical performances, YBCA also acts as a non-collecting museum. The various art exhibits YBCA offers emphasize its celebration of both local and world art. For example, in 2008 the art group Royal Art Lodge presented their psychologically surrealist works, challenging the viewer using simple drawings and more pronounced techniques like cutups. YBCA not only holds specific art shows and exhibits but also is carefully aided by various artists in creating particular atmospheres for its spaces. For instance, Instant Coffee, another artist group, designed a lounge room within YBCA for visitors to simply sit and listen to records with a chic atmosphere, while Space 1026 created YBCA's mural, a showcase of social and physical dimensions.

Solo exhibitions for artists include Tania Bruguera's Talking to Power and Damon Rich and Jae Shin's Space Brainz. (2017).

=== Dance ===
Dance at YBCA includes various forms from many various cultures. In October 2008, Israeli choreographers Inbal Pinto and Avshalom Pollak presented their production of "Shaker" by combining ballet, modern dance, mime, and acrobatic techniques. In addition to more collaborative art forms, YBCA also presents more classical forms of dance, such as ballet. Alonzo King held his company LINES Ballet at YBCA in November 2004, which centered on African American field recordings with various forms of music, narrative, and film playing in the background.

=== Film/Video ===
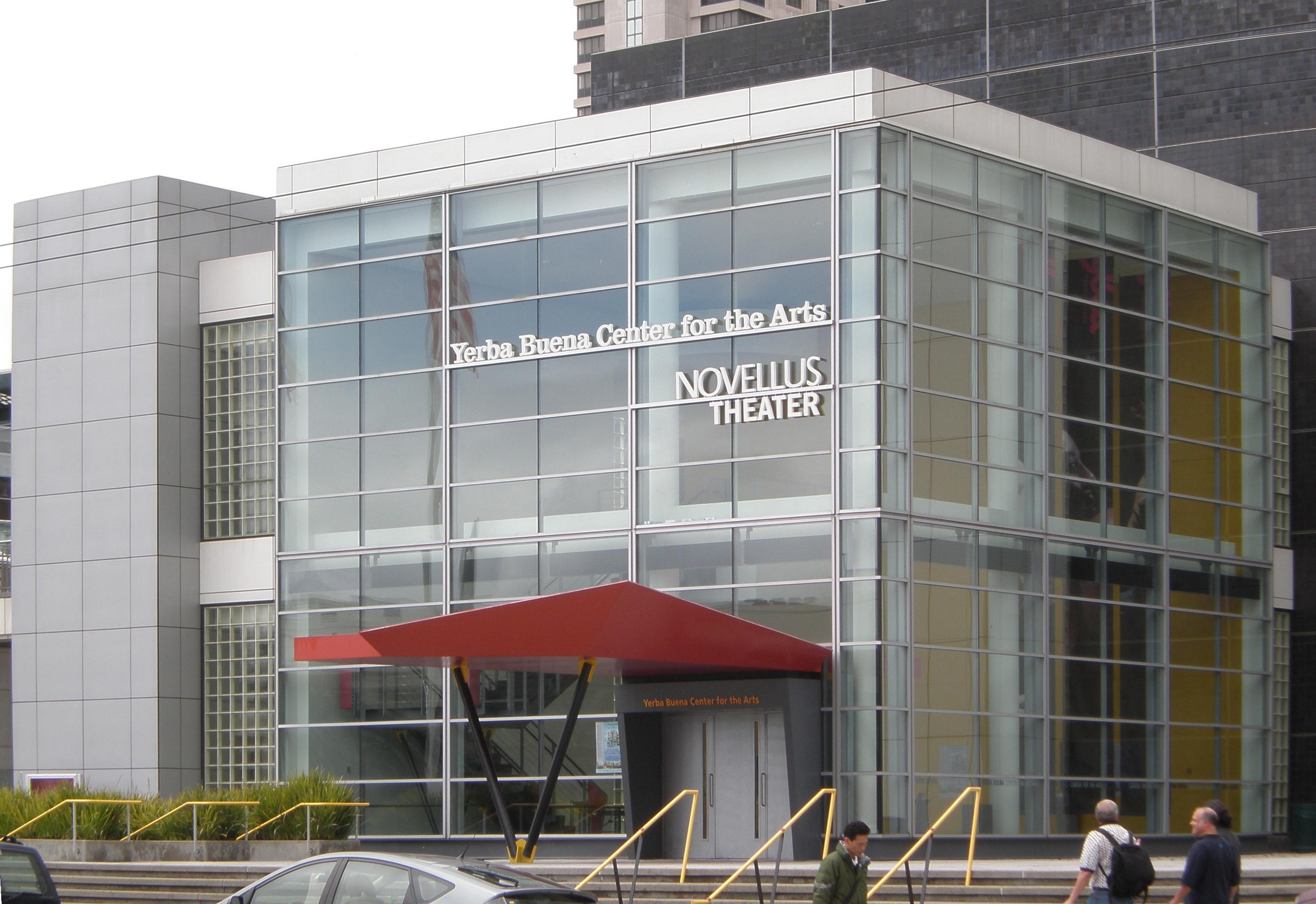
The Yerba Buena Center for the Arts' Novellus Theater

YBCA features all types of cinematic endeavors, including documentaries on a variety of subjects, art-house movies and foreign films. For instance, during the 2009 summer season, it showed documentaries dealing with female masochists (Graphic Sexual Horror), and industrial design (Objectified) while also presenting obscure movie topics, such as its show Winning Isn't Everything: A Tribute to 1970's Sports Film which included the movie The Cheerleaders. The film program was placed on indefinite hiatus in 2018.

=== Live events ===
The center has been the site for product launches by Apple Inc., including iPods and the iPad.

In 2019, it hosted the How I Built This Summit with Guy Raz.
