= Platonov Arts Festival =

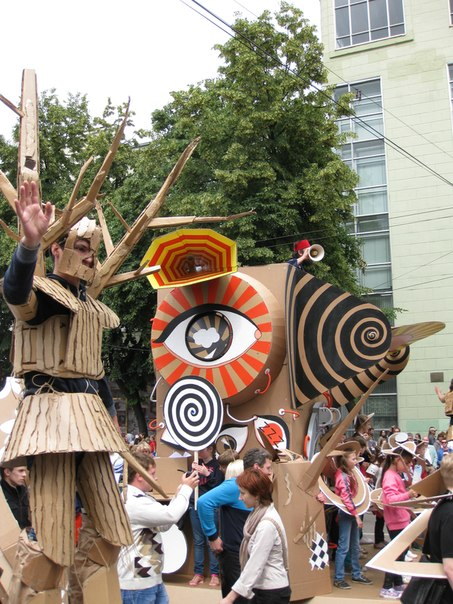
- Founders: Mikhail Bychkov
- Headquarters: Voronezh, Russia
- Website: http://www.platonovfest.com

Platonov Arts Festival (Russian: Платоновский фестиваль искусств) is an international arts festival, named after the Russian writer Andrey Platonov It is held annually since 2011, in Voronezh, Platonov's birthplace, at the beginning of June. The festival events include street theater shows, performances and concerts in halls, open-air music events, and art show, and a book fair.

For the first 4 editions (2011-2014) the festival has become the major cultural project in Voronezh region. Musicians, theatre companies, artists and writers from all over the world take part in this cultural event. The 4th festival edition (5–15 June 2014) included projects from 18 countries - UK, France, Italy, the Netherlands, Germany, Israel, India, Spain, Lithuania, Mali, Bosnia and Herzegovina, Haiti, Portugal, Poland, Slovakia, Belgium, Azerbaijan, Russia.

The Artistic Director of the Festival is Mikhail Bychkov, also known as a theatre director and founder of the Voronezh Chamber Theatre (1994 – 2023).

== Program ==
Platonov Festival presents works in fields of Classical Music, World Music, Theatre, Street Theatre, Exhibitions and Literature.

All festival events are divided into 3 programs:

- Main program includes masterpieces with artistic values recognized at various festivals and by professional critics.
- Actual art program is a platform to showcase creative experiments and search for new artistic means. The festival program is composed by the Expert Council.
- Platonov program consists of works based on Platonov’s literary heritage, or devoted to the Platonov’s work.

Besides the traditional formats for the majority of arts festival (concerts, performances, art exhibitions, meetings with writers), there are special projects in the festival program:

- Street theatres parade – one of the brightest festival projects, a pageantry. Russian and foreign theatre artists, acrobats, dancers, stilt-walkers, musicians and clowns take part in the procession along the main street of Voronezh city – Revolution Avenue (Prospekt Revolutsii).
- Platonov Club – literature project of the festival, which unites scholars, writers, translators, philosophers from Russia and abroad. During round-tables and meetings of Platonov Club new books on Platonov issues are presented, club members discuss influence of Platonov’s ideas on contemporary art and philosophical process, analyze his heritage in the context of modern culture and discourse and raise other related issues.
- During the festival Book Fair, which works 3 days in one of the city squares, a lot of independent publishing houses present and sell their books of different genres – modern prose and poetry, children's books, albums and art books, memoirs and biographies, intellectual literature and non-fiction books, originally illustrated conceptual publications and much more. Meeting with famous Russian writers, poets and literary critics are held within the Book Fair working days, children’s tent provides interactive games and workshops for the very young readers.

== Participants of the festival ==
World Music part, which was added to the music program of the festival in 2014, included concerts of Rokia Traore (Mali), Alim Qasimov (Azerbaijan), Huun-Huur-Tu (Tuva), Cristina Branco (Portugal), Mostar Sevdah Reunion (Bosnia and Herzegovina), Marlene Dorcena (Haiti), Dr. Lakshminarayana Subramaniam (India) and Roma trio Loyko (Russia). Some of the artists had their first performance in Russia within Platonov Festival.

In the Theatre Program, Platonov Festival hosted performances of Philippe Genty, Eimuntas Nekrošius, Alvis Hermanis, Mindaugas Karbauskis, Rezo Gabriadze, Lev Dodin, Rimas Tuminas, Sergey Zhenovach, Susanne Andrade, Victoria Thierrée-Chaplin, Yuriy Butusov, Anton Adasinskiy, Amit Lahav, Ivan Vyrypaev and others. Some foreign productions had their premieres in Russia at Platonov Festival – «Miranda» by Oskaras Koršunovas Theatre (Lithuania), «A Piece on Mother and the Fatherland» of the Polski Theatre from Wroclaw (Poland), cabaret-show «In the CROCODILE bar» directed by Ralph Reichel (Germany), «Happiness» Theatre on Pechersk (Ukraine), monoperformance «GO!» by Polina Borisova (France), «Untitled» by Slava Daubnerova (Slovakia).

The Art of Dance as part of Theatre Program at the past festival editions was presented by performances of such choreographers as Nacho Duato, Jiri Kylian, Jorma Elo, Ohad Naharin, Inbal Pinto & Avshalom Pollak, Russel Maliphant, Josef Nadj. Productions «Daphnis and Chloe» and «The Rite of Spring» (The Grenoble National Choreographic Centre, France), «Oyster» (Inbal Pinto & Avshalom Pollak Dance Company, Israel), Russell Maliphant’s «Still Current» was presented for the first time in Russia within Platonov Arts Festival.

The Street Theatre Program featured French performance «Duo for a dancer and excavator». (Association Beau Geste), shows of PAVANA theatre from Netherlands and Tall Brothers from Moscow, production «Planet Lem» (Teatr Biuro Podróży, Poland) and the street theatres parade along the main city avenue.

== The Platonov Award in Literature and Art ==
The Platonov Award in Literature and Art, established by the Government of the Voronezh region, is annually conferred on Russian and foreign cultural figures for their significant contribution to cultural heritage of Russian Federation, for creation of outstanding works of literature, theatre, music, visual arts, and for innovative development of humanistic and cultural traditions.

=== Platonov Award laureates ===
- Boris Ekimov (2011), Russian writer (born 1938)
- Lev Dodin (2012), Russian theatre director, artistic director of The Maly Drama Theatre – Theatre of Europe (born 1944)
- Mikhail Pletnev (2013), Russian pianist, artistic director and chief conductor of the Russian National Orchestra (born 1957)
- Aleksandr Petrov (2014), Russian animator and animation director (born 1957)
- Andrei Bitov (2015), Russian writer (1937–2018)
