= Yehonatan Vilozny =

Israeli actor

- יהונתן וילוז'ני
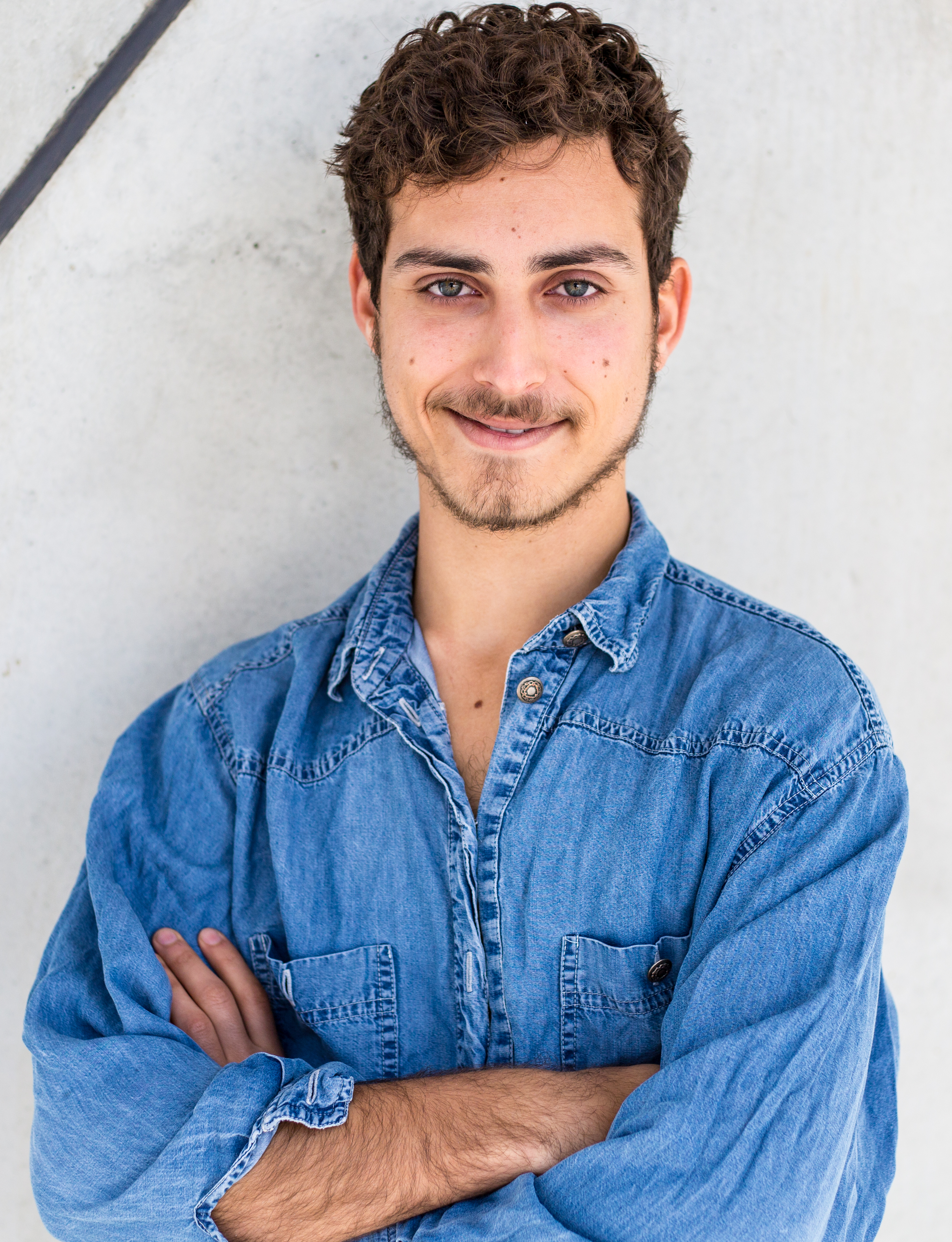
- Born: December 9, 1995 (age 30); Tel Aviv, Israel
- Education: Yoram Loewenstein Performing Arts Studio
- Occupation: Actor
- Father: Shmuel Vilozny

Yehonatan Vilozny (Hebrew: יהונתן וילוז'ני; born 9 December 1995) is an Israeli film, television and stage actor.

== Early life ==
He was born and raised in Tel Aviv in Israel. His father Shmuel Vilozny, is an actor and married to Yehonatan's mother, Iris. He also has three siblings; Michael, Shira and Maya. His grandfather was among the "Tehran children", a group of Polish Jewish that escapes Nazi-occupied Poland. They found temporary refuge in the Soviet Union and then in Tehran in Iran, before settling permanently in then-Mandatory Palestine in 1943.

As a conscript in the Israel Defense Forces, Vilozny served with the Israeli military ensembles. After his service he studied acting at the Yoram Loewenstein Performing Arts Studio in Tel Aviv for one year. His brother, Michael also studied at the acting studio, graduating in 2024.

== Career ==
In 2017–2018, he had a role as Elhanan, a former member of the Hilltop Youth in Kipat Barzel, a drama series about Haredi military recruits in the Israel Defense Forces that also starred Ishai Golan.

He was also a series regular, playing Sharon on the Nickelodeon fantasy series, Kadabra (Spell Keepers) from 2017 to 2019.

At the end of 2018, he performed in the play "Spring Awakens", alongside Gideon Sa'ar's daughter, Alona Saar at the Cameri Theater. In the same year he appeared alongside Stav Strashko and Niv Sultan in the critically acclaimed teenage drama film, Flawless.

In 2020–2021, he played Tom in the high school thriller series, Black Space on Channel 13 alongside Guri Alfi and Yoav Rotman. In 2021, he was part of the supporting cast in Nadav Lapid's drama film, Ahed's Knee.

In 2022, he played Yosef, a closeted young Haredi man in Fire Dance. He appeared alongside Yehuda Levi in the drama series, created by Rama Burshtein.

In 2023, he had a lead role in the 1970s-set kibbutz coming of age drama film, Kissufim.

In 2024, he began starring in the play "Eros and Melancholia" at Beit Ziyonei America in Tel Aviv. The play was written by Yoav Rinon, Head of the Department of Comparative Literature at the Hebrew University in Jerusalem. Rinon wrote it as a classical tragedy, according to the models of ancient Greece. It centres on the love triangle between three men at a Jerusalem university.

== Filmography ==
Year	Title	Role	Notes
2014	Echad shtayim shalosh		Short
2015	What Doesn't Kill You	Soldier #1	Short film
2017	Tonight You Belong to Me	The soldier	Short
2017 - 2018	Kipat Barzel	Elhanan	Recurring role S2
2017 - 2019	Kadabra (Spell Keepers)	Sharon Lavi	Series regular
2018	Flawless	Maayan	Film
2020	Summer Shade	Oriel	Short
2020	Black Space	Tom Tadmor	3 episodes
2021	Ahed's Knee	Sargeant	Film
2022	Fire Dance	Yosef	Recurring role
2023	Kissufim	Yoav	Film
2023	Full Speed	Mikey Kogan	Series regular
2025	Full Speed Motorstar	Mikey Kogan	Film
2025	Falling Up	Rami	Short film

== Personal life ==
He is currently in a relationship with Alex Sloin, a university student, studying psychology.

In response to the Gaza war hostage crisis, Vilozny has given his support to the hostages by joining demonstrations in Tel Aviv for their return to Israel.
