= Netsanet =

Netsanet (Amharic: ነፃነት) is an Ethiopian primarily feminine given name. Notable people with the name include:

- Netsanet Achamo (born 1987), Ethiopian long-distance runner
- Netsanet Desta (born 2000), Ethiopian middle-distance runner
- Netsanet Gudeta (born 1991), Ethiopian long-distance runner
- Netsanet Mekonnen (born 1988), Ethiopian-born Israeli actress
- Netsanet Workneh (1983–2026), Ethiopian actor, filmmaker and television personality
