= Inbal Pinto and Avshalom Pollak Dance Company =

Israeli contemporary dance company

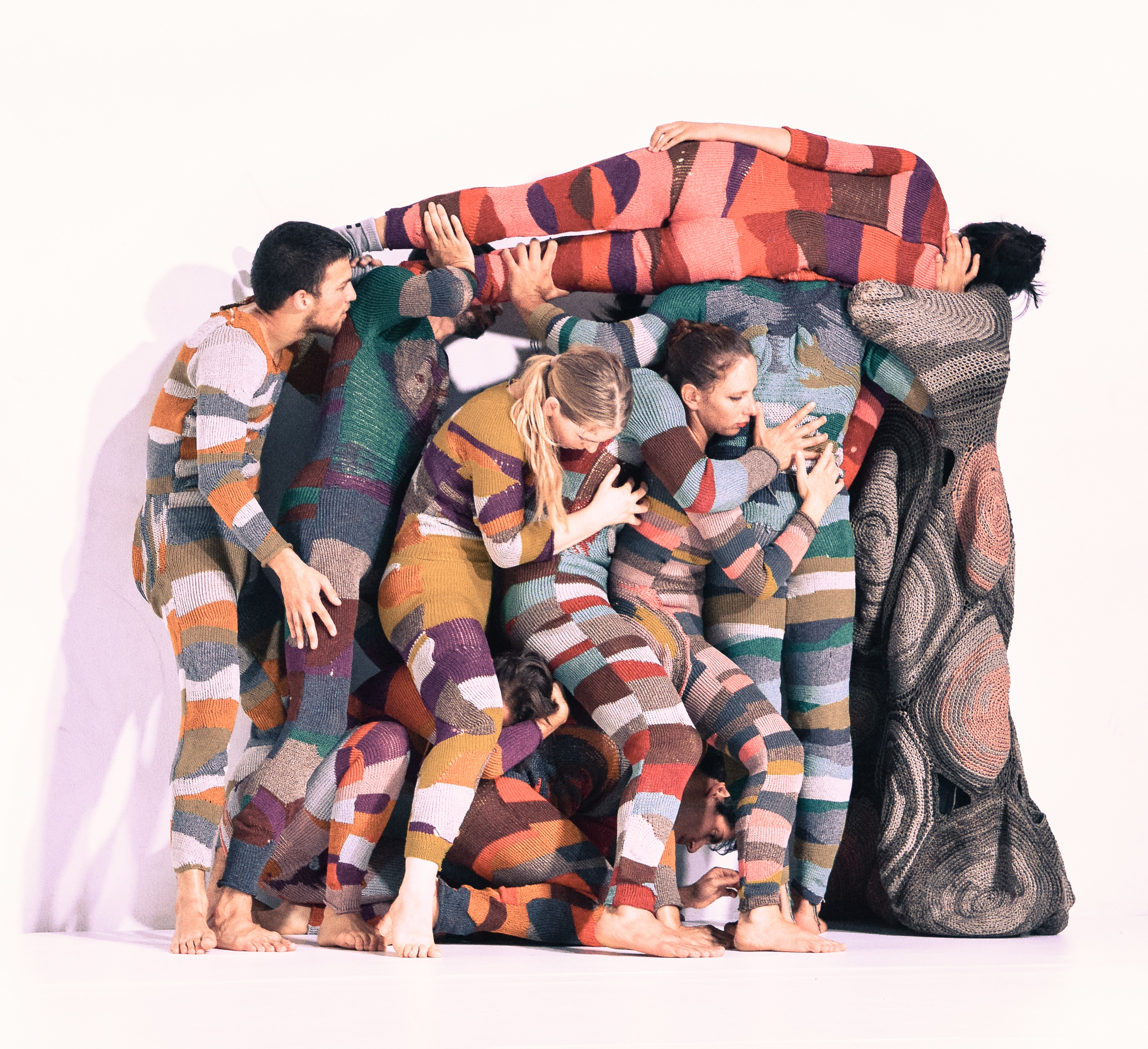
Wallflower, 2014

The Inbal Pinto and Avshalom Pollak Dance Company (2002–2018) was an Israeli contemporary dance company founded by choreographer Inbal Pinto and actor Avshalom Pollak, which operated in Tel Aviv, Israel. Pinto and Pollak were the artistic directors of the company, in charge of selecting pieces to represent the company. The two have split up in 2018, creating (and, in the case of Pinto, recreating) their own ensembles, Avshalom Pollak Dance Theater and Inbal Pinto Dance Company.

== About the Company (2002-18) ==
Since 2002, the company has brought many contemporary danceworks to the stage for all sectors of the population. The uniqueness of their creators is seen through every detail in each piece, for example in choreography, staging, the selection of soundtracks, costume design, and prop design. The company has 12 regular dancers and actors, works and conducts shows at the Suzanne Dellal Center, and is often invited to represent Israel at important festivals and leading cultural events around the globe.

Apart from contemporary dance performances, the company also performs operas and musicals. For example, in 2006, they performed the opera Armid by Christoph Willibald Gluck in Wiesbaden, Germany, and again at the Israeli Opera. In 2013, they performed the play The Cat that Lived a Million Times, based on Yoko Sano's book, in Tokyo, Japan, as well as the opera The Cunning Little Vixen by Leos Janacek at the Opera house in Bergen, Norway.

Throughout the years Pinto and Pollak cooperated with different artists, among them choreographer Robby Barnett, with whom they created the show Rushes in 2007 for the American contemporary dance company Pilobolus; the Norwegian company "Kitchen Orchestra", created the soundtracks for Trout, which was performed for the first time in Stavanger, Norway in 2008. Other collaborations include the cooperations with choreographer Talya Bek, who created the works Sodad in 2009 and Empire in 2010.

In 2013, illustrators Roni Fahima and Shimrit Alkanti illustrated pictures and animations for the productions of The Cunning Little Vixen and Dust. Moreover, in 2014, they joined the Japanese Musicians Omitaro Eba, Hirufomi Nakamura, and Mayu Ganto, who had created the music for the show Wallflower and that Pinto and Pollak had met during their time in Japan working on The Cat that Lived a Million Times. Pinto and Pollak cooperate regularly with French lighting designer Yohan Tiboli.

== Selected work ==
Inbal Pinto

- "A chance for a 100" 1994
- "Wrapped" 1998
- "Oyster" 1999

Inbal Pinto and Avshalom Pollak

- "Boobies" 2002
- "What Good Would the Moon Be" 2004
- "Armide" 2003
- "Shaker" 2006
- "Armide" 2006
- "Rushes" 2007
- "Hydra" 2007
- "Trout" 2008
- "Toros" 2010
- "Bombyx Mori" 2011
- "Goldfish" 2012
- "The Cunning Little Vixen" 2013
- "The Cat that Lived a Million Times" 2013
- "Dust" 2013
- "Wallflower" 2014
- "Wrapped" 2015 (renewed production)
- "Slug" 2016

== Awards ==
Inbal Pinto

- 2000 Bessie Award for "Wrapped"
- 2000 Israeli Theater Academy award for "Oyster"

Inbal Pinto and Avshalom Pollak

- 2004 The Landau Award for the Arts of the Stage
- 2007 The Israeli Ministry of Education and Culture award for creation
- 2011 The Israeli Ministry of Education and Culture awards for Artistic achievements and performance
- 2014 The Israeli Dance Critics Circle award "Best Dance Show" for "Wallflower"
