= Ahed's Knee =

2021 film by Nadav Lapid

- Israeli theatrical release poster
- Hebrew: הַבֶּרֶךְ
- Directed by: Nadav Lapid
- Written by: Nadav Lapid
- Produced by: Osnat Handlesman-Keren; Talia Kleinhendler; Judith Lou Lévy; Ève Robin
- Starring: Avshalom Pollak; Nur Fibak
- Cinematography: Shai Goldman
- Edited by: Nili Feller
- Production companies: Les Films du Bal; Pie Films; Komplizen Film GmbH
- Distributed by: Pyramide Distribution (France)
- Release date: 7 July 2021 (Cannes)
- Countries: Israel; France; Germany
- Language: Hebrew
- Box office: $219,878

Ahed's Knee (Hebrew: הַבֶּרֶךְ, romanized: Habereḵ, lit. 'The Knee') is a 2021 autobiographical drama film written and directed by Nadav Lapid. Starring Avshalom Pollak as Y, it follows an expat filmmaker returning to Israel aiming to produce a film about the Israeli–Palestinian conflict, but is invited to a screening of one of his films in a government institution.

The film had its world premiere at the main competition of the 2021 Cannes Film Festival on 7 July, where it won the Jury Prize.

== Synopsis ==
"Y" (Avshalom Pollak), a filmmaker, is working on a new film about Palestinian activist Ahed Tamimi. He travels to the Arava desert to attend a screening of one of his films at a local library, a government institution. There he meets Yahalom (Nour Fibak), an official from the Ministry of Culture. She explains he needs to sign a form that defines the subject of his appearance at the screening, a form that offers him a checklist of topics acceptable to the government all of which reflect its right-wing ideology and antipathy to criticism. Y becomes close to Yahalom while exploring how to use her sympathy for a more liberal approach to culture and speech to attack the government's agenda.

== Cast ==
- Avshalom Pollak as Y
- Nur Fibak as Yahalom
- Yoram Honig as the farmer
- Yonathan Kugler as the young Y
- Lidor Ederi as Narkis
- Amit Shoshani as the fearful soldier
- Yehonatan Vilozny as the sergeant
- Naama Preis as the casting director
- Ortal Solomon as Ahed 1
- Mili Eshet as Ahed 2
- Oded Menaster as Smotrich
- Netta Roth as the young actor

== Release ==
The film was selected to compete for the Palme d'Or at the 2021 Cannes Film Festival, it had its premiere on 7 July 2021 in the festival. It was also selected in 'Icon' section of 26th Busan International Film Festival and was screened in the festival in October 2021. It was invited in the Soul of Asia section at the 52nd International Film Festival of India for screening in November.

The film was inspired by the story of Palestinian activist Ahed Tamimi.

== Reception ==
On the review aggregator website Rotten Tomatoes, 75% of 59 critics' reviews are positive, with an average rating of 6.7/10. The website's critical consensus reads, "An occasionally uneasy blend of human drama and message movie, Ahed's Knee forcefully reaffirms that the personal is political." Metacritic, which uses a weighted average, assigned the film a score of 80 out of 100 based on 17 critics, indicating "generally favorable reviews".
