= Florentine (TV series) =

Israeli television drama series

- פלורנטין
- Genre: Drama
- Created by: Eytan Fox; Gal Uchovsky
- Directed by: Eytan Fox
- Starring: Ayelet Zurer; Karin Ophir; Uri Banai; Avshalom Pollak; Sami Huri; Dana Modan; Ami Smolartchik; Nir Friedman
- Country of origin: Israel
- Original language: Hebrew
- No. of seasons: 3
- No. of episodes: 39

Production
- Running time: 30 minutes
- Production company: Channel 2

Original release
- Release: 1997 – 2000

(Hebrew: פלורנטין) is an Israeli television drama series created by Eytan Fox and Gal Uchovsky, which aired on Channel 2 from 1997 to 2000, lasting three seasons. The ensemble cast includes Ayelet Zurer, Karin Ophir, Uri Banai, Sami Huri, Dana Modan, Ami Smolartchik, Nir Friedman and Avshalom Pollak. The show revolves around childhood friends living in Florentin, a neighborhood in the southern part of Tel Aviv.

The show was the first in the country to feature gay characters in main roles. It also featured the first-ever same sex kiss on Israeli television, between two male characters. In 2000 it featured the first-ever lesbian kiss on Israeli television between Shira (Zurer) and Nicole (Ronit Elkabetz).

== Premise ==
The series follows the eventful lives of childhood friends from Jerusalem that relocate to Tel Aviv in their 20s.

== Plot summary ==
The series mainly follows three characters who live in a shared apartment in Florentine: Tuti (Ofir), an innocent young woman who loves chocolate, Iggy (Banai), a gay man working as a baker, and their new flatmate, Tomer (Pollak), a film student who moved to Tel Aviv from Jerusalem and struggles with his sexual orientation. The series also follows the lives of their neighbors and friends living next door. Most episode focus on the story of one character and his or her relationships, professional life and the course of their life, trying to find self-determination, love and happiness. The Florentine neighborhood quickly becomes a symbol of a life of indeterminacy and endless youth, serving as both a point of refuge and a hopeless situation for the complicated characters.

== Cast and characters ==
- Ayelet Zurer as Shira Steinberg
- Karin Ophir as Tuti, an innocent young woman that lives with Iggy and Tomer
- Uri Banai as Iggy, an eccentric gay baker that lives with Tuti and Tomer
- Avshalom Pollak as Tomer, a film student from Jerusalem that moves in with Tuti and Iggy. He is gay and struggles with his sexual orientation.
- Sami Huri as Koby
- Dana Modan as Gali
- Ami Smolartchik as Hanan
- Nir Friedman as Tzemer

== Reception ==
It is regarded as one of the most pioneering shows in the history of Israeli television and was a ratings success. According to The Advocate, the show "opened eyes with its groundbreaking gay characters." Mako also praised the portrayal of the main gay characters: "Iggy, the eccentric baker played by Uri Banai and surely the introverted Tomer played by Avshalom Pollak, also provided a different angle to the image of the Israeli gay, more flattering and humane than ever. "Florentine" made a real revolution in the representation of gays on the small screen."

== See also ==
- Israeli television
- Culture of Israel
