= Shmuel Vilozny =

Israeli comedian and political activist

- שמואל וילוז'ני
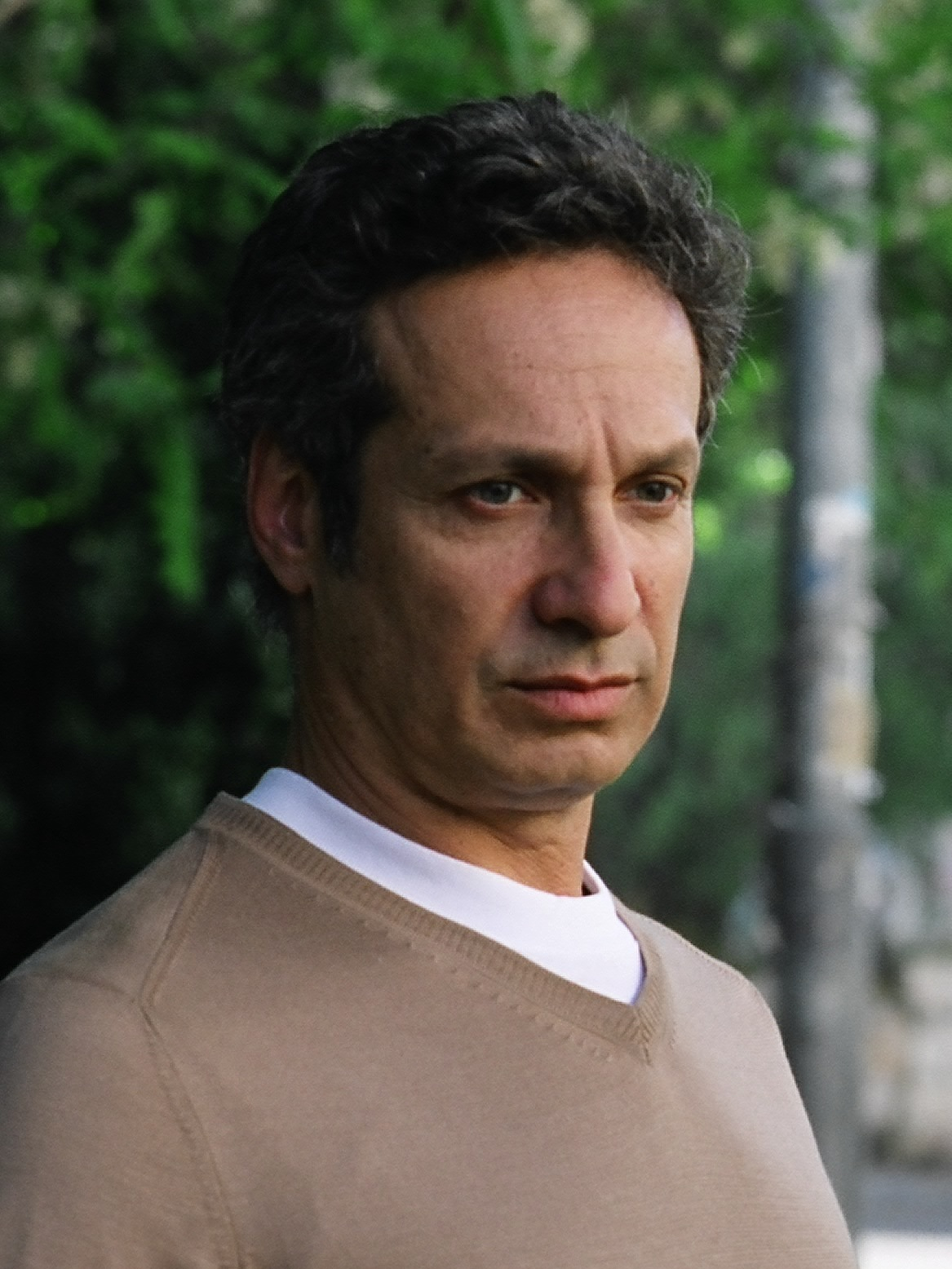
- Vilozny in 2007
- Born: 10 January 1954 (age 72); Ramat Gan, Israel
- Occupations: comedian, actor
- Children: 4 (including Yehonatan Vilozny)

Shmuel "Shmulik" Vilozny (Hebrew: שמואל "שמוליק" וילוז'ני; born 10 January 1954) is an Israeli comedian, actor and director as well as a political activist.

== Early life ==
Vilozny was born in Ramat Gan, Israel. His father Mordecai was a Holocaust survivor. Vilozny graduated from the Beit Zvi School for the Performing Arts in 1979.

== Career ==
=== Stand-up comedy ===
Vilozny was one of the first stand up comedians in Israel who contributed tremendously to the flourishing of the Israeli stand-up scene in the mid-1980s after he founded a stand-up club in Tel Aviv called the "Camel Comedy Club" which hosted various stand-up shows regularly and from which some of the most popular comedians in Israel nowadays originally emerged. Vilozny became fascinated with stand up comedy after he saw a street stand up show for the first time in London during the 1980s. After his return to Israel, Vilozny began performing in various stand-up routines throughout Israel, which were considered innovative at the time and soon thereafter founded the stand-up club. However, after several young prominent and promising comedians emerged in his stand-up club, Vilozny starting to minimize the amount of his performances, and began to focus his career on acting in theater and film.

=== Theater ===
Through the years Vilozny played in various plays, and in addition directed several plays as well. The roles he portrayed in the theater include: Sebastian in "Twelfth Night", Horatio in "Hamlet", Valère in Molière's "The Miser", Truffaldino in "Servant of Two Masters", and more. Vilozny also played in the Library Theater in Ramat Gan, in which he played among others, Jimmy Porter in John Osborne's "Look Back in Anger" and Mr. Slik in a play of that name. In the Beer Sheva Theatre Vilozny played Oberon in "A Midsummer Night's Dream" and Antipholus of Ephesus in "The Comedy of Errors".

By 2003, Vilozny joined the Cameri theater, after being in the Habima theater for nine years. In the Cameri theater Vilozny starred in Neil Simon's "Chapter Two" and later on performed in the plays "Love Letters" (מכתבי אהבה), "Backstage" (אחורי הקלעים), and from July 2006 Vilozny has been starring in the play "Yetush BaRosh" (יתוש בראש) alongside Limor Goldstein.

During the 1990s, Vilozny directed several plays for the Habima theater including "Twelve Angry Men", "An Inspector Calls", and "Divorce 4 TWO" starring Shlomo Vishinsky, as well as Vilozny's one-man show called "The Jew in the dark." (יהודי בחושך)

=== Film and television ===
Through the years Vilozny starred in 8 feature films, most of which were filmed during the 1980s. He decided eventually to abandon his film career in the early 1990s in order to focus on other occupations, especially theater. In 1983, he starred in his first film which was "The Dormitory" (הפנימיה) in which he played alongside Alon Abutbul. In 1984 he played in "Testimony of Rape "(עדות מאונס) alongside Uri Gavriel and Oshik Levy. In 1986 he played in "The Great Madness" (השגעון הגדול) alongside Anat Waxman, Dov Navon and Sefi Rivlin. During 1987 he starred in "Tel Aviv-Berlin" and "Don't Give a Fuck" (לא שם זין) which was based on a book by the same name by Dan Ben-Amotz. In 1992 Vilozny starred in Michal Bat-Adam's film The Deserter's Wife and in 1995 he produced a documentary called "Daddy let's go to the Luna Park" in which he revealed his complex relationship with his dad who is a Holocaust survivor and the film follows their journey to Auschwitz.

Through the years Vilozny also starred in various television programs. In 1997 he starred in the comedy series "Tzahal 1" (צה"ל 1). Later on he hosted the travel program "Zman Galil" on the Israeli Channel 10. In 2002 Vilozny played in the TV film "Two minutes from Paradise" ("שתי דקות מפרדייז") directed by Daniel Syrkin. In 2003 Vilozny starred in the TV series "Tzimerim" ("צימרים") in the Israeli channel 1. Two years later Vilozny participated in the second season of the drama series "Seize the Sky" (לתפוס את השמיים), and also hosted the satirical program "Pkakim" (פקקים) on the Israeli sports channel

=== Political activity ===
Vilozny was the first in Israel who made the transition from the entertainment scene to municipal politics when he was eventually elected as a member of the Council of the Municipality of Tel Aviv-Yafo.

At 1989 Vilozny participated in the municipal elections running as the head of the party "Shmuel Vilozny-Our City" ("שמואל וילוז'ני-העיר שלנו") but the party received only one seat (his own). He was widely considered as a prominent opposition leader against the then-mayor Shlomo Lahat. At the end of his term Vilozny retired from politics, but eventually made a comeback to politics in 1998 when he ran for mayor of Tel Aviv. In the 1998 elections Vilozny's party got two seats in the city council and in the mayoral elections, he ended up in third place, after Ron Huldai and Doron Rubin, with approximately 13.5% of the votes. His party was in the opposition during his term, after which he announced that he would not run again the next municipal elections, and that he was retiring from politics.

In the 2003 Knesset elections Vilozny was ranked at the fifth position for the party The Greens.

== Personal life ==
Vilozny is married with four children, including the actor, Yehonatan Vilozny
