= Betti-Sue Hertz =

Betti-Sue Hertz is an American art curator and art historian and director of the Wallach Art Gallery at Columbia University.

== Education ==
Hertz has a BA from Goddard College and an MFA from Hunter College, City University of New York; she later studied for a PhD in art history at the Graduate Center there (ABD, 2000).

== Career ==
Hertz was director of the Longwood Arts Project in the Bronx, New York City, from 1992–1998. She was curator of contemporary art at the San Diego Museum of Art in San Diego, California, from 2000 to 2008, and then director of visual arts at the Yerba Buena Center for the Arts in San Francisco from 2009 to 2015. She taught at the San Francisco Art Institute and at the California for the College of Arts.

== Published Writings: Essays and Books ==
- (1999) Urban Mythologies: The Bronx Represented since the 1960s, “Artistic Interventions in the Bronx.” 18-27. NY: Bronx Museum of the Arts. (ISBN 091753526X)
- (2002) "The Independent Wedge: A Brief History of Alternative Exhibition Spaces in the United States with Case Studies from New York" in In-between international community-initiated art space, 1a space, Hong Kong.
- (2003) Selected Works, San Diego Museum of Art, San Diego, authored 30 contemporary art entries. (ISBN 978-0937108314)
- (2004 & 2006) Past in Reverse: Contemporary Art of East Asia, San Diego Museum of Art, distributed by D.A.P., editor and essay, “Crisscross: New Trends in Art, East Asia,” 14-23. Essay republished in Chinese in Art China, Yishu Dangdai, Shanghai, winter, 2006. (catalogue :ISBN 0937108332)
- (2005) Farsites: Urban crises and domestic symptoms in contemporary art, San Diego Museum of Art: Installation Gallery; [Tijuana] : Tijuana Cultural Center, “The Mobility of the Fragment: Architectural Outtakes and Photographic Cuts of the Urban”; “New York City: Blackouts 1965, 1977." (catalogue: ISBN 0964255456)
- (2006) Transmission: The Art of Matta and Gordon Matta Clark, San Diego Museum of Art, distributed by University of Washington Press, 2006. Editor and essay, “Double Triangle: The Madness of the Unexpected,” 11-23. (catalogue: ISBN 0937108383)
- (2006) Lisette Lagnado, Adriano Pedroa. eds. 27a. Bienal de São Paulo: Como Vivier Junto: Guia, São Paulo: Fundaçã, interviews with Mark Bradford (168), Lu Chunsheng (142), Taller Popular de Serigrafía (234), Héctor Zamora, (92).
- (2006) Personal Views: Regarding Private Collections in San Diego, San Diego Museum of Art, entries for six contemporary art collections: Eloisa and Chris Haudenschild (33), Irwin and Joan Jacobs (37), Michael Krichman and Carmen Cuenca (46), Lucille and Ron Neeley (49), Iris and Mathew Strauss (62), Joyce and Ted Strauss (65). (ISBN 0937108391)
- (2007) Animated Painting, San Diego Museum of Art, distributed by D.A.P., 2007. Editor and essay, “Handwork, Digital Flows, and Contemporary Art Animation”, 18-27. (catalogue: ISBN 0937108375)
- (2007) “Taking it to the Streets: an interview with Betti-Sue Hertz by Calvin Reid,” in South Bronx Contemporary: Longwood Arts Project’s 25th Anniversary, Bronx Council on the Arts, 2007, 12-17.
- (2008) Eleanor Antin: Historical Takes, co-published by Prestel and San Diego Museum of Art, 2008. Editor and essay, “Eleanor Antin’s Transpositions: A Feminist View of Academic Painting in the Age of Digital Photography”, 81-91. (catalogue: ISBN 3791340557)
- (2010) Drifts and Derivations: Experiences, journeys and morphologies, Museo Nacional Centro De Arte, Reina Sofia, Madrid. Essay, “Roberto Matta: Convergences in Architecture, Landscape and Inscape.” Madrid : MNCARS, 203-215. (catalogue: ISBN 9788480264259)
- (2010) Yoshua Okón: US, Yerba Buena Center for the Arts, San Francisco/Museo de Arte Carrillo Gil, Mexico City and Landucci, Mexico City, distributed by D.A.P. Essay, “Invoking the Productive Negative”, 5-15 (Spanish) and 69-79 (English). (catalogue: ISBN 9780982678916)
- (2010) Renée Green: Endless Dreams and Time-Based Streams, Yerba Buena Center for the Arts, San Francisco, distributed by D.A.P. Editor and essay, “Seeing Text” 84-95. (catalogue: ISBN 0982678908).
- (2010) “Autopaisaje, 1999-2001” in Gonzalo Lebrija: As Time Goes By, Other Criteria, London, 2010, 62-65. (ISBN 978-1-904212-66-9)
- (2011) In Regina Basha, “Climate Change: East Coast to West Coast Curators Articulate the Evolving Curatorial Role”, in Marysol Nieves, Taking Aim!: The business of Being an Artist Today, Fordham University Press, Bronx, New York, 61-64. (ISBN 0823234142)
- (2011) Audience as Subject, Yerba Buena Center for the Arts, San Francisco, distributed by D.A.P., 2011. Editor and essay, “Audiences, Art, and the Potential of the Polis”, 15-24. (catalogue: ASIN: B00E3U38JS).
- (2011) The Matter Within: Contemporary Art of India, Yerba Buena Center for the Arts, San Francisco, distributed by D.A.P. Editor and essay, “Fragments of India: With Thought, Feeling, and Emotion”, 10-17. (catalogue: ISBN 0982678940).
- (2011) Song Dong: Dad and Mom, Don’t Worry About Us, We Are All Well, Yerba Buena Center for the Arts, San Francisco, distributed by D.A.P. Editor and essay, “Changing Veneration’s Shape: Song Dong’s New Portraiture”, 75-79. (catalogue: ISBN 0982678924)
- (2014) Dissident Futures, Yerba Buena Center for the Arts, San Francisco, distributed by D.A.P. Editor and essay, “Rapid Flux: Notes on Art, the Sciences, and the Future, 9-13. (catalogue: ISBN 0982678967)
- (2015) Public Intimacy: Art and Other Ordinary Act in South Africa, Yerba Buena Center for the Arts, San Francisco, distributed by D.A.P. (forthcoming). Co-editor with Dominic Willsdon and Frank Smigiel. (catalogue: ISBN 0982678975)
