= The Deserter's Wife =

1991 French-Israeli film

- Theatrical release poster
- La Femme du déserteur
- Directed by: Michal Bat-Adam
- Written by: Michal Bat-Adam
- Produced by: Jacques Kirsner; Marek Rozenbaum
- Starring: Fanny Ardant; Sharon Alexander; Daniele Napolitano; Gidi Gov; Aviva Ger; Samuel Vilozny; Ruth Geller; Safira Zachai; Hillel Ne'eman; Noam Sheriff; Yigal Sade; Gilles Benvadid; Moshé Mizrahi; Nicole Kasel; Alona Kimhi; Gabi Eldor; Dalia Shimko; Ami Weinberg; Shiri Golan; Gilya Stern; Hubert Ackerman; Lasha Shimshoni; Ruby Porat-Shoval; Raffi Goshen; Bahat Kalachi; Amnon Doyv; Meir Dayan; Orna Silman; Danny Segev; Na'ama Ze'el; Matti Harari; Ran Bone; Gali Bone; Nafissa Chimal; Shmuel Shaked; Neta Rosenthal
- Cinematography: Fabio Conversi
- Edited by: Rivka Yogev
- Music by: Alex Cagan
- Production companies: Mimar Film Production; Mod Films; Transfax Film Productions; Canal+; Solyfic; Investimage 3; Procirep
- Distributed by: Mimar Film Production; Midbar Films
- Release date: 20 December 1991 (France)
- Running time: 81 Minutes
- Countries: France; Israel
- Languages: Hebrew; French

The Deserter's Wife (French: La femme du déserteur) is a 1991 French-Israeli co-production dramatic independent underground art film directed by Michal Bat-Adam.

== Synopsis ==
Nina (Fanny Ardant), a French concert pianist, meets Ilan (Sharon Alexander), an Israeli computer specialist who is on vacation, in Paris. They fall in love, marry, and, move to Israel with their son, Gili (Daniele Napolitano). Not much later, Ilan is drafted into the Israeli military for compulsory military service, as the situation in the Middle East is worsening: Saddam Hussein has attacked Kuwait with his Iraqi forces and the Second Gulf War is imminent. After Nina is accepted into the Israel Philharmonic Orchestra, she receives a call from the military and learns that her husband was wounded during a battle. She hurries to him and finds out, to her horror, that Ilan was not injured by enemy troops but by Israeli soldiers when he tried to leave his post illegally. While Ilan is wounded in a hospital and is unable to speak due to a state of shock, the accusations that he is a deserter, she finds out, are true. Despite this revelation, Nina continues to take care of him, breaks off an affair with another man, and tries to understand his motives. Their environment's reaction, however, extends not only to Ilan but also to Nina. When Nina's concert debut with the Israel Philharmonic Orchestra is about to take place, symbolically, on the day of the United Nations' ultimatum to Saddam Hussein, the social pressure grows immeasurably. Nina leaves Ilan and returns to France with Gili.

== Background ==
Actress Fanny Ardant and cinematographer Fabio Conversi got to know each other while filming Margarethe von Trotta's Love and Fear during 1988. In 1990 their daughter Baladine was born. Ardant and Conversi eventually parted. However, they worked together again and again, as with La Femme du déserteur, as well as in 2008, on the comedy Hello Goodbye, which Conversi produced, while Ardant played alongside Gérard Depardieu. La Femme du déserteur premiered on 20 December 1991 in France. Critic Lisa Alspector opined that "[t]his 1991 melodrama creates only generic sympathy for the disgraced, misunderstood husband, and none at all for the smarmy, selfish wife, whose motives are ambiguous throughout." In Israel, Al HaMishmar critic Yael Israel underscored that "had this film never been made, it would have needed to be invented," while Yedioth Ahronoth critic Yehuda Stav wrote that the film is "humble and sympathetic, its material taken from daily Israeli experiences," and, Davar critic Uri Shin praised the film's uncompromising refusal to placate the audience.
