= Andrei Bitov =

Russian writer (1937–2018)

- Андрей Георгиевич Битов
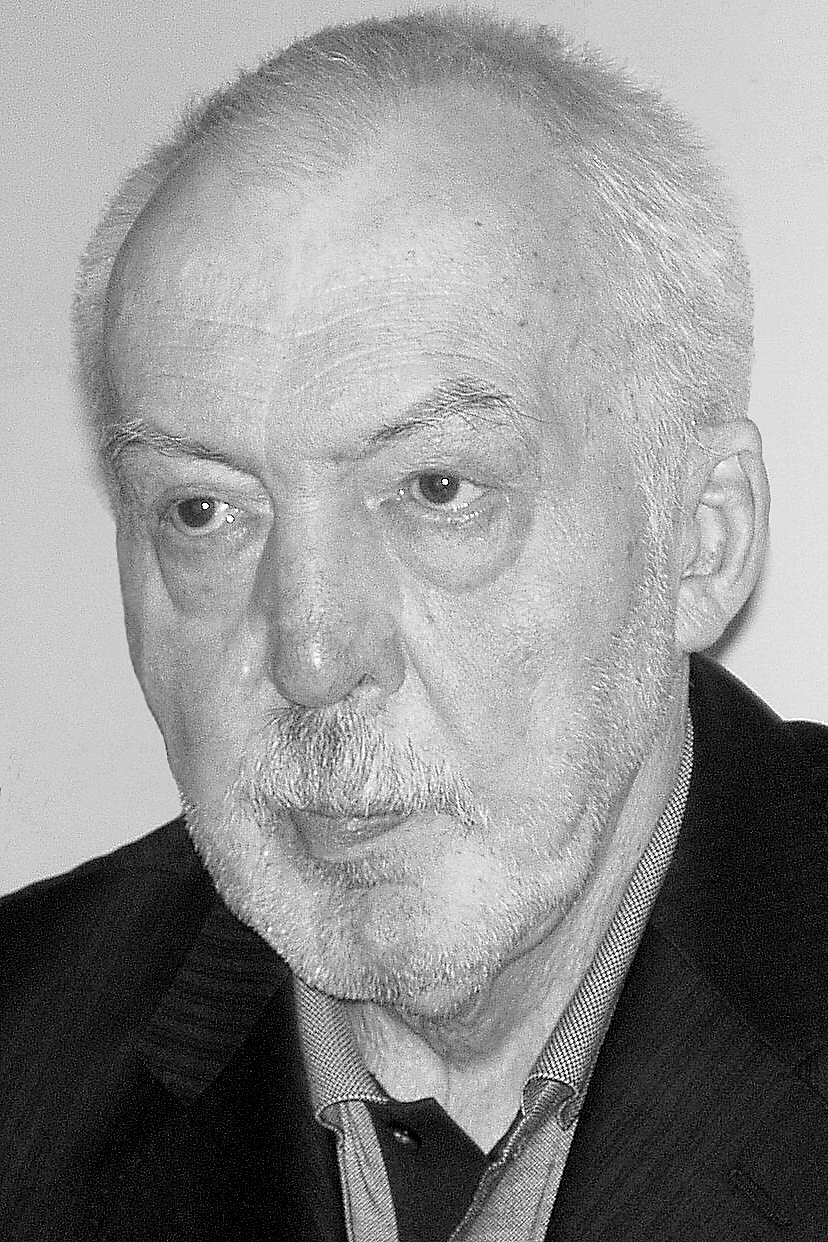
- Bitov in 2008
- Born: 27 May 1937; Leningrad, Russian SFSR, USSR
- Died: 3 December 2018 (aged 81); Moscow, Russia
- Occupation: Writer
- Writing career
- Language: Russian
- Genre: Novel
- Literary movement: Russian postmodernism

Andrei Georgiyevich Bitov (Russian: Андре́й Гео́ргиевич Би́тов, 27 May 1937 – 3 December 2018) was a prominent Russian writer of Circassian ancestry.

== Biography ==
Bitov was born in Leningrad. His father was an architect and his mother was a lawyer. He completed his secondary education in 1954 and began writing two years later. In 1957, he became a student at the Leningrad Mining Institute. While there, he joined a literary association for young writers led by Gleb Semyonov. He also served with a building battalion in the north and graduated in 1962.

He then began writing poetry and short, absurdist stories which were not published until the 1990s. In 1965, he became a member of the Union of Soviet Writers. By 1978, he had published ten works, but his now best known work, Pushkin House, had to be published in the United States and did not appear in the USSR until two years after the beginning of Perestroika.

In 1988, he was one of the founders of the Russian PEN Club and was its President beginning in 1991. He also taught at the Maxim Gorky Literature Institute.

He received an award from Oktyabr for his story Something with love... in 2013. This was followed in 2014 by the Government Award of the Russian Federation for culture and, in 2015, he was awarded the Platonov Prize. In 2018, he received the Order of Friendship. He died in Moscow in 2018.

== English translations ==
- Life in Windy Weather: Short Stories, Ardis, 1986.
- Pushkin House, Farrar, Straus & Giroux, 1987 & Dalkey Archive Press, 1998.
- A Captive of the Caucasus, HarperCollins, 1994.
- Ten Short Stories, Raduga Publishers, 1995.
- The Monkey Link, Farrar, Straus and Giroux, 1999.
- The Symmetry Teacher, Farrar, Straus and Giroux, 2014.

== See also ==
- List of notable 20th-century writers
- Russian literature

== Secondary literature ==
- Sven Spieker: Figures of Memory and Forgetting in Andrej Bitov's Prose. Postmodernism and the Quest for History. (= Slawische Literaturen) Frankfurt: PeterLang, 1995, ISBN 978-3-631-46940-8.
- Ellen Chances: Andrei Bitov: The Ecology of Inspiration (Cambridge Studies in Russian Literature), Cambridge UP, 2006, ISBN 0-521-02527-3
