= Queen of Lapa =

- Directed by: Theodore Collatos; Carolina Monnerat
- Produced by: Theodore Collatos; Josh Crane; Matt Grady; Carolina Monnerat
- Starring: Luana Muniz
- Cinematography: Theodore Collatos
- Edited by: Theodore Collatos; Matt Grady
- Music by: Michael Leonhart
- Production companies: Brokenhorse Productions; Factory 25
- Release date: 2019
- Running time: 73 minutes
- Country: Brazil
- Language: Portuguese

Queen of Lapa is a 2019 documentary film directed by Theodore Collatos and Carolina Monnerat which profiles Luana Muniz, a Brazilian Brazilian transgender activist and cabaret performer. In 2002, Muniz founded the Associação dos Profissionais do Sexo do Gênero Travesti, Transexuais e Transformistas do Rio de Janeiro (Association of Travesti, Transexual, and Transvestite Sex Professionals of Rio de Janeiro) to fight for greater rights for Rio's sex workers. The documentary uses Direct Cinema style to depict the lives of a small community of trans sex workers in Rio de Janeiro's Lapa neighborhood.

The film premiered internationally at the Sheffield DocFest on June 7, 2019 and was included in Göteborg Film Festival "Focus on Brazil" January, 2020. It's distributed by Factory 25 and was release theatrically in 2020-2021.

Queen of Lapa is described as "recalling trailblazing documentaries, inviting and jubilant" and "a triumph of documentary filmmaking" and an "essential look into the camaraderie and struggles."

== Background ==
Co-director Carolina Monnerat grew up on the block where Luana Muniz's house operated. Collatos, co-director, and Monnerat initially discussed filming with Muniz in 2010 after befriending her. The couple then spent six years attempting to raise funding for the documentary to no avail. The two returned and shot the film six years later when Monnerat's work as a professional dancer brought her and Collatos back to Rio.

== Style ==
Collatos, as cinematographer and editor, and Monnerat, as sound recordist and producer, chose not to script the documentary. Rather than directly interviewing the subjects, they allowed the individuals being recorded to share aspects of their life when they were ready to open up. Influenced by Direct Cinema and Cinema Verite, with original music by Michael Leonhart, over the course of the documentary, the sex workers at Muniz House talk about subjects like the dangers they face doing their work, gender-affirming care and their religious faith. In describing his creative choices, Collatos comments, "It’s intrusive to ask a question. Do you talk or do you listen? You’re going to get more truth if you listen." The documentary ends with an acknowledgment of Luana, who died in 2017.

== Reception ==
=== Awards ===
- NewFest New York's LGBT Film Festival: Best Documentary Feature 2019.
- Sidewalk Film Festival: Best SHOUT Feature 2019.
- Rhode Island International Film Festival 2019: Alternative Spirit Award (Documentary) First Prize.
- Wicked Queer Boston 2020: Grand Jury Award
- Philadelphia Latino Film Festival 2020: LOLA Award
- George Lindsey UNA Film Festival 2020: Mitchel-West Award
