= Kissufim (film) =

- כיסופים
- Directed by: Keren Nechmad
- Written by: Hadar Arazi; Yonatan Bar-Ilan; Keren Nechmad
- Produced by: Iftach Gabay; Micky Rabinovitz
- Starring: Swell Ariel Or; Yehonatan Vilozny; Ofer Grinberg
- Cinematography: Ram Shweky
- Edited by: Sahar Vizel
- Distributed by: United King Films
- Release dates: November 4, 2023 (Cyprus International Film Festival); July 18, 2024 (Israel)
- Running time: 88 mins
- Country: Israel
- Language: Hebrew

Kissufim (Hebrew: כיסופים) is a 2023 Israeli coming of age drama film directed by Keren Nechmad. The film stars Swell Ariel Or, Yehonatan Vilozny and Ofer Grinberg. It takes place on Kibbutz Kissufim in 1977, the period after the Yom Kippur War and before the Camp David Accords (peace agreement with Egypt) in 1978. It follows a group of young Nahal recruits experiencing love and freedom. It centres on three friends, Eli (Swell Ariel Or), Yoav (Yehonatan Vilozny) and Ron (Ofer Grinberg). The three move between emotions of love, hate, jealousy and passion, while maintaining a deep friendship. Eli's character is based on the true story of Elaine Gazit, a 21-year-old Israeli woman serving with Nahal on the kibbutz. She was killed by a grenade thrown by a terrorist at Palestine Square in the Gaza Strip in 1980.

The film premiered at the Cyprus International Film Festival in Cyprus on 4 November 2023. It was released in theatres in Israel on 18 July 2024, and this was followed by an international release on Netflix in August 2024.

The film was shot before the October 7 attacks. It is dedicated to the victims of Kissufim massacre and all terror victims in Israel.

== Plot ==
The film takes place in 1977, before Israel's withdrawal of the Gaza strip. In this period, Israelis traveled to Gaza's beaches and the Saturday market .

A group of young male and female conscripts in the Israel Defense Forces, complete their final stage of service with Nahal on Kibbutz Kissufim. They are hopeful for peace, after the Yom Kippur War and a year before the Camp David Accords that brought lasting peace between Egypt and Israel. Together they watch the television news, showing Anwar Sadat's visit to Jerusalem. In the close environment, intense friendships and bonds are formed. Amid the post-adolescent freedom, the Nahal participants also explore their sexual freedom. At the centre is a triangle between Eli (Or), Yoav (Vilozny) and Ron (Grinberg). Men on the kibbutz compete for the affections of Eli, who is fiercely independent and struggles to reconcile the innocence of her youth with the confrontation of war. Eli wants freedom and peace, and is murdered in a terrorist attack, devastating her friends.

== Cast ==
- Swell Ariel Or as Eli
- Yehonatan Vilozny as Yoav
- Ofer Grinberg as Ron
- Adam Gabay as Udi
- Tamir Ginsburg as Eldar
- Mili Eshet as Michaela
- Erez Oved as Shoshan
- Lir Katz as Hila
- Herzl Tobey as Tzvika
- Doron Amitay as Avraham
- Paula Kroh as Anka

== Background ==
Elaine Gazit was born in Tel Aviv to parents, Yehuda and Marietta. Yehuda was born in Israel and Marietta was born in Vienna and immigrated to Israel in 1938 at the age of 8, after Anschluss. Marietta's father, Elaine's grandfather, was a celebrated lawyer. He arranged fake passports for the family and a car through a client from Czechoslovakia. The family crossed into Czechoslovakia, continuing to Holland as they realised that a German invasion of Czechoslovakia was imminent. The family then fled to Israel where Marietta's uncle was living. After the war, her father joined the Austrian consulate in Haifa. Marietta and Yehuda met at Tel Hashomer Hospital, where Marietta was a nurse and Yehuda was visiting his grandfather. Marietta later worked as an El Al flight attendant before running a business together with Yehuda. Yehuda died of cancer in 1990.

Gatzin was nearing the end of her mandatory military service with the Israel Defense Forces, and spending the final stage with Nahal on Kibbutz Kissufim. On Saturday, February 16, 1980, Gatzin left Kibbutz Kissufim to go shopping in Gaza. At the time it was considered customary for Israelis living close to the strip, to go shopping at the markets in Gaza and visit the beaches. Gatzin was in a military jeep with her friend and kibbutz member, Assaf Tzach, Assaf's mother and Reuven Poyer, also a kibbutz member. At 12 noon, they were looking for parking at Palestine Square, and a 21-year-old terrorist threw a grenade into the back of the jeep. Elaine was hit by the impact of the grenade, got out of the jeep and collapsed and died.

The man responsible for Gatzin's murder was caught and he went to trial. He was defended by his Israeli lawyer, Leah Tsemel. He was convicted and received a life sentence, but was released five years later, under the Jibril Agreement.

In 2000, twenty years after Elaine's death, her family learned that the government and security forces had received reports of strong unrest in the Gaza Strip the weekend that Elaine was killed. However, a decision was not taken to close the border.

== Production ==
The idea to produce the film began at a memorial for Elaine Gazit, that was attended by the actor and director, Dan Turgeman, also from Elaine's Nahal group. At the memorial, Turgeman suggested to Gazia's family and friends that a film should be made about Elaine. They eventually contacted the film producer, Mickey Rabinovitz, who dated Elaine.

The script is based on conversations and stories that Elaine's friends had with scriptwriter, Yonatan Bar-Ilan that were subsequently dramatized.

Elaine's sister, Dafna, also attended filming at Kissufim: "Everything looks like it did then, nothing had to be changed. As if time stood still, the Nahal rooms also remained as they were."

The film was shot over 17 days on location at Kibbutz Kissufim and Zikim Beach. Kibbutz members participated fully with the production, allowing wide use of the locations and even appear as extras in the film. Due to the proximity to the Gaza Strip, the Kibbutz arranged a security briefing for the crew. Saar Margolis, who conducted the security briefing, was killed in October 7 attacks. Nechmad said: "I remember Saar telling us what to do if a rocket is fired and what to do if someone enters the kibbutz, and we all listened. But we never thought it could be a reality. We never thought we would experience anything like that.”

Nechmad also spoke about the political tones in the film: "I made the film with the aim of giving expression to my moderate leftist side, the way I see Israel and the people who just want to live in peace. Today, the characters in the film who strive for brotherhood and peace in this place suddenly seem naive. It's taken from them. It's heartbreaking. The whole experience of watching the film, it has changed, but in the end, the message is the same: people try to live their lives in the State of Israel, but the reality is bigger than them. I am a person who seeks peace, and now I ask myself if it is at all possible? Will the day come when we actually see it happen? Am I naive to think like that? It's an identity crisis."

Nechmad changed the ending of the film in the wake of the October 7 attack on Israel: "I’m not in a place of hope and this is what I stand for... This is where I am. We’re in a place where we need to show what happened."

=== Casting ===
The casting of Swell Ariel Or as Elaine (Eli in the film), was supported by Elaine's family. Elaine's mother, Marietta, had been a fan of Or since watching her in The Beauty Queen of Jerusalem.

== Release ==
The film received its US premiere at the Orlando Film Festival in the fall of 2023. Or and others involved in the film attended the US premiere, raising awareness about the Gaza war hostage crisis: "We came to the premiere with hostages shirts on us. And we had police with us too, to make sure that we were safe. And honestly, we were really scared. For a tiny drop of hope, we won the best foreign film."

It received its European premiere at the Cyprus International Film Festival on 4 November 2023. In December of that year it was screened at William Morris Endeavor in Beverly Hills, with Or and Nechmad attending. Later that month it screened at Brooklyn Art Haus in New York City. The screenings also act as fundraisers for the devastated kibbutz.

On 10 March 2024, the film was screened at the Boca International Jewish Film Festival in Florida.

On 5 June 2024, it was part of the lineup for Israeli Cinema Day, held in Israel and supported by the Ministry of Culture and Sport.

It was released in theatres in Israel on 18 July 2024. In August of the same year it began to stream in Israel and internationally on Netflix.

== Reception ==
Hannah Brown wrote about the film for The Jerusalem Post: "Kissufim gracefully weaves the coming-of-age tropes with the reality of life in Israel during a time of hope." Brown continued: "it helps that the movie stars some of Israel's most appealing young actors, who help us get caught up in their love lives and dreams."

Malina Saval wrote about the film for the magazine Los Angeles: "Cinematographer Ram Shweky captures the essence of this youthful wistfulness, crafting in Kissufim an idyllic landscape of muted hues and hypnotic visuals. Scenes of rippling pool water and the rugged expanse of the Negev desert. Much of Kissufim evokes the idealistic Zionist dream, as embodied by 1970s hippie kids plucking fruit from kibbutz trees, chasing after farm animals and harboring wanderlust fantasies of traversing the world, of seeing what lay beyond the wired fences and landmine-filled traps dividing Israel and its Arab neighbors... More than anything, Kissufim functions as cinematic confirmation that exquisite beauty sometimes exists amongst the worst things in the world. The film captures the diabolical juxtaposition of horror and hope — side by side."

Lior Zaltzman of Kveller, wrote that: "Though set decades ago, and filmed long before October 7, so many of the themes of the show feel ever prescient today." Zaltzman continued: "Kissufim is beautifully immortalized. You can almost smell the pool from the screen, feel the splash of those old sprinklers in the verdant fields in the desert, immerse yourself in the hustle and bustle of the communal dining room, the center of the kibbutz universe. You can taste the dreams of youth in the shadows of heartbreak, of PTSD lingering in the shadow of the Yom Kippur War, impossibly painful and fresh in this group of young people. “Kissufim” is about the truth of being Israeli: Heartbreak and tragedy meet you everywhere."

=== Accolades ===
Orlando Film Festival, 2023

- Best Foreign Film
- Best Cinematography

Cyprus International Film Festival, 2023

- Best Foreign Film
- Best Music
- Best Editing
