= Maya Eshet =

Israeli actress

- מאיה עשת
- Born: 9 May 1990 (age 36); Jerusalem, Israel
- Occupation: Actress
- Years active: 2003–present
- Spouse: Konstantin Melikhov
- Relatives: Mili Eshet (sister)

Maya Eshet (Hebrew: מאיה עשת; born 9 May 1990) is an Israeli actress, known for Shiur Moledet: Avdei Hashem, Teen Wolf and Fear the Walking Dead.

== Early life ==
Eshet was born in Jerusalem, Israel, to a family of Ashkenazi Jewish descent. Her mother Ilva (née Grunuvich) immigrated to Israel from Sweden. Her father is Arik Eshet, and both her parents are voice actors and acting coaches. She has two sisters, one of whom is Israeli actress Mili Eshet. She grew up in moshav Mesilat Zion, Israel.

== Personal life ==
She is married to American actor Konstantin Melikhov, whom she met during her acting studies in New York.

== Filmography ==
=== Film ===
Year	Title	Role	Notes
2003	Shiur Moledet: Avdei Hashem	Tamar	also known as Voices from the Heartland: Slaves of the Lord
2014	Bro, What Happened?	Pilar	
2014	Whatever We Want To Be	Sam	Short film
2017	To the Bone	Pearl	
2017	Flower	Claudine	
2017	Keep Watching	Marissa Vasquez / The Wasp	
2018	Dead Women Walking	Becky	
2020	The Centre Cannot Hold	Storm	Short film

=== Television ===
Year	Title	Role	Notes
2013	My Boring Life	Nora	Recurring role (season 1); 3 episodes
2014	Kroll Show	Nameless member	Episode: "Finger Magnets"
2014–2016	Teen Wolf	Meredith Walker	Guest role (season 3), recurring role (seasons 4-5); 10 episodes
2015	Man Seeking Woman	Unkluk'tu	Episode: "Scepter"
2016	Love	Girl	Episode: "It Begins"
2018	Nightflyers	Lommie	Main role, 10 episodes
2020	Star Trek: Picard	Index	Episode: "Remembrance"
2020	All Rise	Lee Ann Moss	Episode: "Bye Bye Bernie"
2021	Red Bird Lane	Dee	TV Movie
2023	Fear the Walking Dead	Sam "Shrike" Krennick	Recurring role (season 8); 6 episodes

=== Web ===
Year	Title	Role	Notes
2017	Scandal: Gladiator Wanted	Jordan	

=== Stage ===
Year	Title	Venue
2013	The Outsider - Lovecraft Nightmare Suite	The Lex Theatre

=== Music videos ===
Year	Title	Role	Artist
2013	"Woman's World"	Woman	Cher
