= Netsanet Mekonnen =

Ethiopian-Israeli Actor

- נצנת מקונן
- Born: July 7, 1988 (age 38); Addis Ababa, Ethiopia
- Occupations: Film actress, Television actress, Theater actress

Netsanet Zenaneh Mekonnen (Hebrew: נצנת מקונן; born July 7, 1988) is an Ethiopian-born Israeli film, television and theater actress.

== Early life ==
Mekonnen was born in Addis Ababa, the capital city of Ethiopia, to a Christian mother and a half-Jewish father. She is one of six siblings. When she was two, her mother left to the United States, and her father subsequently immigrated to Israel, when she was about four years old. In 1994, at the age of six, she and her sister Bitania joined him, and converted to Judaism.

Her father was very successful in Ethiopia, and well-regarded professionally. This was far from the case in Israel. After three years as a single parent, he, too, left for the United States, hoping to find his wife there, and to make a new life as a journalist. Mekonnen, now in the third grade, found herself in a "pnimia" – a type of boarding school for at-risk youth, or those from broken families.

Mekonnen next saw her mother when she was 18. Growing up without family, as an immigrant, and as a black-skinned minority, made Mekonnen question her identity – an issue that became central to her as an artist. She is outspoken about the racism in Israeli society and how it affects her and other actors of Ethiopian origin, and has been supportive of the Ethiopian-Israeli protest movement for social justice.

While serving in the Israel Defense Forces, in the military theater troupe, Mekonnen produced and performed in an autobiographical play called "Netsanet". The play continued to run for over a decade. The meaning of her name in Amharic is "freedom". After the army, Mekonnen studied dance at the Nadine Bommer Academy and at the Broadway Dance Center in New York, specializing in ballroom and latin dance. She completed her bachelor's degree in theater at the Kibbutzim College of Education, Technology and the Arts.

Mekonnen is a polyglot: In addition to Hebrew and Amharic, she speaks English, Spanish and Portuguese. She studied at the College of Nutrition, and is a frutarian.

== Career ==
=== Television ===
- 2012 – "תנוחי"
- 2013 – "שולחן לשישה" (table for six) with Natan Detner and Yuval Scharf
- 2015 – "Zaguri Imperia" and "Eretz Nehederet"
- 2016 – "מלאך של אמא" (mother's angel) and North Star

=== Film ===
- 2014 – "Zero Motivation"
- 2016 – "אשת השגריר" (the ambassador's wife) with Ester Rada and Yehezkel Lazarov
- 2018 – "Flawless" with Stav Strashko and Asi Levi

=== Theater ===
- 2008 – "Netsanet", autobiographical one-woman show, produced by the IDF theater company and the National Youth Theater. Directed by Asaf Shlomo.
- 2008 – "High School Musical", with Gilat Ankori, Maya Shoef and Amit Farkash.
- 2012 – Lead role in the musical "איש חסיד היה" (a pious man); joint production of Haifa Theatre and Habima Theatre. Directed by Itzik Weingarten.
- 2013 – "בת המלך" (king's daughter); Haifa Theater.
- 2014 – Lead role in the play "גזע" (race) with Rami Heuberger and Norman Issa; Haifa Theatre . Directed by Moshe Naor.
- 2015 – "Homage", directed by Maor Zaguri.
- 2016 – "ילדת הקשת בענן" (the rainbow girl); Goshen Theater. Directed by Tom Shwarzberg.
- 2017 – "The Little Prince"; Dimona Theater. Directed by Uri Vidislevski.
- 2018 – Lead role in "Svetlana"; Dimona Theater; written by Mekonnen and Uri Vidislevski.

=== Teaching ===
Mekonnen teaches acting at the Kibbutzim College, and dance at the E-motion studio.

== Awards ==
- 2011 – America-Israel Cultural Foundation Award
- 2012 – First place in the Ohala Halevy singing competition
