= Obscuro Barroco =

- Directed by: Evangelia Kranioti
- Produced by: Evangelia Kranioti
- Starring: Luana Muniz
- Cinematography: Evangelia Kranioti
- Edited by: Yorgos Lamprinos
- Production company: Tropical Underground
- Release date: 16 February 2018 (Berlin)
- Running time: 59 minutes
- Countries: Greece; France
- Language: Portuguese

Obscuro Barroco is a documentary film, directed by Evangelia Kranioti and released in 2018. A Greek and French coproduction, the film profiles Luana Muniz, a Brazilian transgender activist.

== Summary ==
Obscuro Barroco is an object that transforms infinitely, that devours infinitely: it is the mouth of Luana Muniz, a legendary figure of Rio de Janeiro’s night that serves as the stolen point of entry to the city's nocturnal incandescence. The film opens with a ballet of thick tropical vegetation blowing in the sea breeze and bowing under heavy rain drops. The beauty of the tropical vegetation is so intense that it appears to border upon the artificial, so that nature itself seems fictitious. The vegetation will reappear in the glittering décor of a carnival float, which is a gateway to an artificial paradise. The film touches the viewer's capacity for metempsychosis, the strange and unknown faculty through which our soul can move through and inside other bodies.

Obscuro Barroco is a docufiction about the dizzying heights of gender and metamorphosis. It is also a cinematographic hommage to a land of extremes, the city of Rio de Janeiro. Following the path of iconic transsexual figure Luana Muniz (1961-2017), the film explores different quests for the self through transvestism, carnaval and political struggle. In turn, it asks questions about the desire for transformation of the body, both intimate and social.

The film had its theatrical premiere at the 2018 Berlin International Film Festival, where it won a Jury Award from the Teddy Award program.
