= Mili Eshet =

Israeli actress

- מילי עשת
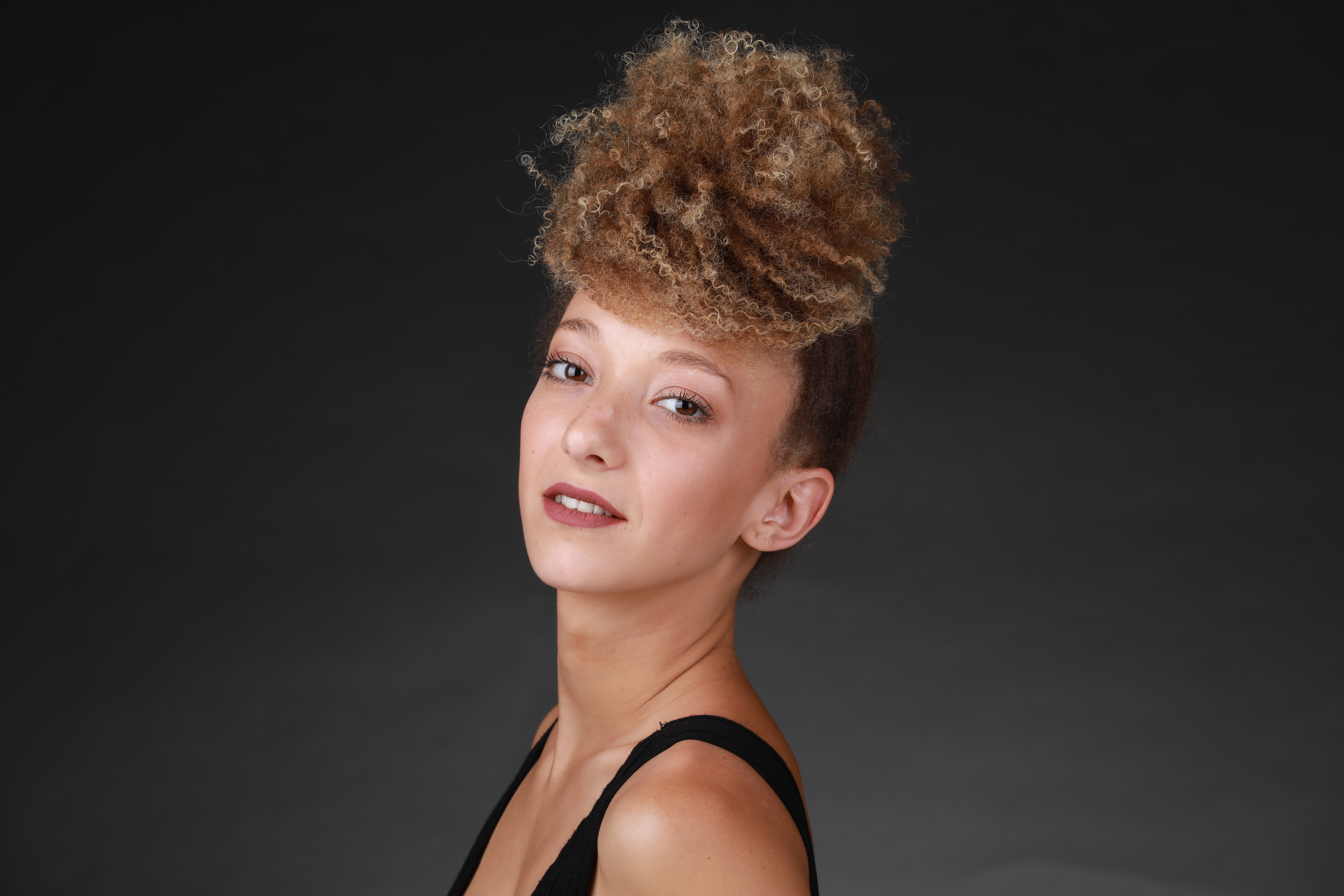
- Born: 30 June 1993 (age 32); Jerusalem, Israel
- Occupation: Actress
- Years active: 2001–present
- Relatives: Maya Eshet (sister)

Mili Eshet (Hebrew: מילי עשת; born 30 June 1993) is an Israeli actress, known for her appearances on the television show Sovietzka (2023) and her starring role in the feature film Barren (2022).

== Early life ==
Eshet was born in Jerusalem, Israel, to a family of Ashkenazi Jewish descent. Her mother Ilva (née Grunuvich) immigrated to Israel from Sweden. Her father is Arik Eshet, and both her parents are voice actors and acting coaches. She has two younger sisters, one of whom is Israeli actress Maya Eshet. She grew up in moshav Mesilat Zion, in central Israel.

== Career ==
Eshet began her career as a voice actor. In 2001, at the age of 9, she voiced Lucy in the Hebrew dub of 64 Zoo Lane, a British-French animated children's series. Subsequently, she provided voiceover work for the Hebrew dub of "Barbie: Pegasus and the Magic of the Flying Horse" and "Barbie and the 12 Dancing Princesses" (2005 and 2006 respectively). She began her live action acting career in 2009 in the movie "Ili and Ben", directed by Uri Ravid.

In 2018, Eshet played an undercover police officer in the TV docu-drama "Murderesses from Beit Tov" (Ratzḥot Mi-Beit Tov), about the murder of Mala Malevsky (an American tourist murdered in 1985). In 2019, Eshet was cast in a guest role in the series "Fifty" (Ḥamishim).

In 2016, Eshet appeared in a central role in the film Beyond the Mountains and Hills, directed by Eran Kolirin. The film appeared at the Cannes Film Festival and was nominated for the Best Film Award at the Ophir Awards. Eshat played Yifat Greenbaum, the daughter of the film's central character.

Eshet also had a role in the film Ahed's Knee, directed by Nadav Lapid. Eshet played the role of Ahed Tamimi. The film won the Jury Prize at the Cannes Film Festival.

In 2022, Eshet starred in the film Barren (dir. Mordechai Vardi) as Faigi, half of a young Haredi couple struggling with infertility. Eshet's character seeks a mystical solution for her inability to conceive with her husband (Yoav Rotman), but suffers a terrible outcome. The film was screened at the Jerusalem Film Festival.

In 2023, she appeared in the Kan 11 comedy series "Sovietska", as the best friend of the main character.

Eshet appeared in a supporting role in Kissufim (2023), a dramatization of the story of Elian Gazit, a 21-year-old Israeli woman who was killed in a bombing in 1980.

In 2024 she played the role of Ivana, Gita's friend on The Tattooist of Auschwitz.
