= Luana Muniz =

Brazilian transgender activist and cabaret performer

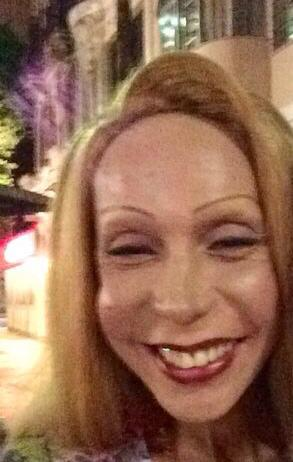
Luana Muniz

Luana Muniz (1958–2017), known as the Queen of Lapa, was a Brazilian transgender activist and cabaret performer. In 2002, Muniz founded the Associação dos Profissionais do Sexo do Gênero Travesti, Transexuais e Transformistas do Rio de Janeiro (Association of Travesti, Transexual, and Transvestite Sex Professionals of Rio de Janeiro) to fight for greater rights for Rio's sex workers.

== LGBTQ+ activism ==
Muniz founded a hostel in Lapa to give transgender sex workers a safer place to live and work.

Muniz also help found the city of Rio's Damas Project which focused on helping transgender and transvestite people in the workplace. In addition to advocacy and education about trans rights, Damas offered trans people skill training and courses to succeed in the labor force.

== Films and documentaries ==
Muniz has been featured in three documentaries. She was the subject of the 2017 documentary Luana Muniz: Daughter of the Moon, directed by Rian Córdova and Leonardo Menezes. The 2018 film Obscuro Barroco by Greek director Evangelia Kranioti, profiles Muniz as she describes Brazil's queer culture. The documentary Queen of Lapa, released in 2020, focused on the lives of women living in the hostel Muniz opened in Lapa to provide housing and community for trans sex workers. Directors Theodore Collatos and Carolina Monnerat focus on the women's stories of their lives and experiences working in Rio. Queen of Lapa won the Grand Jury Prize for non-fiction features at NewFest.

== In art ==
Brazilian photographer Pedro Stephan documented Muniz and her role in Lapa's LGBTQ culture. In 2009, the gallery LGC Arte Contemporânea exhibited a photo essay of 140 images featuring Muniz among other icons of Brazilian gay culture. The exhibition Luana Muniz, a rainha da Lapa (Luana Muniz, Queen of Lapa) received more than a thousand visitors in the first two weeks it was open.

== Death ==
Muniz died on 6 May 2017 of pneumonia. After learning of her death, priest Father Fábio de Melo with whom she had collaborated on several social development projects, posted, "What a sad weekend! Go in peace, Queen."
