= Flawless (2018 film) =

2018 film

- Film poster
- Directed by: Tal Granit; Sharon Maymon
- Written by: Tal Granit; Sharon Maymon
- Starring: Stav Strashko
- Release date: 16 July 2018
- Running time: 97 minutes
- Country: Israel
- Language: Hebrew

Flawless (Hebrew: הנשף, Haneshef, 'The Prom') is a 2018 Israeli drama film directed by Tal Granit and Sharon Maymon. In July 2018, it was one of five films nominated for the Ophir Award for Best Picture, and led the industry with a record of twelve total nominations, of which it won four awards. Flawless was the first film in the history of Israeli cinema for which a transgender woman, Stav Strashko, was nominated for the Best Actress award.

== Plot ==
Three unpopular high school student girls in Jerusalem decide to travel to Kyiv to get plastic surgery, hoping this will change their lives for the better and help them find their dream dates for the prom. On their way, Tigist and Keshet discover that Eden has her own reasons to embark on this journey.

== Cast ==
- Stav Strashko as Eden
- Netsanet Mekonnen as Mika
- Noam Lugasy as Keshet
- Asi Levi as Keren
- Yehonatan Vilozny as Maayan
- Niv Sultan as Avigail
