= Avshalom Pollak =

Israeli actor and theatre director

- אבשלום פולק
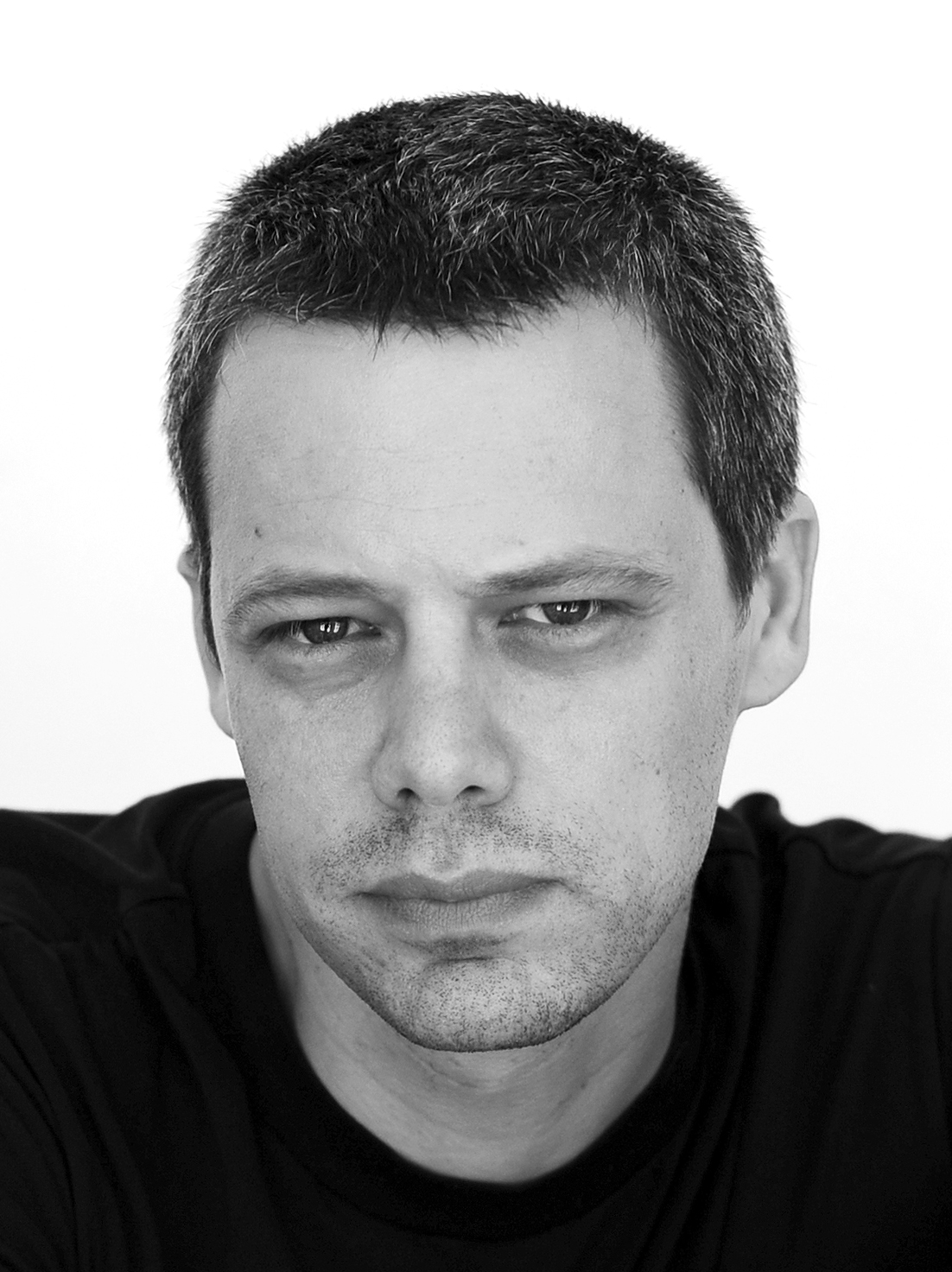
- Avshalom Pollak
- Born: October 5, 1970 (age 55); Haifa, Israel
- Occupations: Director, choreographer, artistic director, actor.
- Title: Artistic Director

Avshalom Pollak (Hebrew: אבשלום פולק; born October 5, 1970, also known as Avshalom Polak) is an Israeli actor, director, choreographer and dance company artistic director.

== Early life and education ==
Avshalom was born in Haifa, Israel. He was trained as a classical actor and graduated from the Nissan Nativ Drama School in Tel Aviv. After graduating, Avshalom was playing in a large number of films and television programs, as well as many theatrical plays. Among his leading roles were William Shakespeare's Romeo and Juliet as Romeo; Casssio in Othello; Molière's Valere in The Miser; Chekhov's Tuzenbach in Three Sisters and more. He had the opportunity to work at the Habimah Theatre, the Cameri Theater, Gesher Theater and the Haifa Municipal Theatre.

Since 1994, Avshalom Pollak has been working with Inbal Pinto, with whom he founded the Inbal Pinto and Avshalom Pollak Dance Company.

In 2011 Pinto and Pollak were given Israel's ministry of culture award for creation of Toros and Rushes Plus. In 2003 they directed, choreographed and designed the opera Armide by Christoph Willibald Gluck. In 2013 they directed, choreographed and designed the original musical The Cat That Lived A Million Times by Yoko Sano in Tokyo, and the opera The Cunning Little Vixen by Leoš Janáček in Bergen, Norway.

Together, Inbal Pinto and Avshalom Pollak have created, choreographed and designed the following works for their company: Oyster a co-production with The Maison De La Danse, Lyon, France (1999), Oyster won the award of The Israel Theater Academy Award for the year 2000 as The Best Production in Stage Arts category. BOOBIES a co-production with DeSingel Theater, Antwerp, Belgium (2002). Shaker (2006). Armide an opera by Christoph Willbald Gluck at the Opera House of Wiesbaden in Germany (2004) and The Israeli Opera (2007). RUSHES A collaboration with Pilobolus Dance Theatre (2007). Hydra a co-production with Saitama Arts Foundation, Israel Festival (2008) and Stepts No. 11 (2008). Trout a co-production with Stavanger2008, Cultural Capital of Europe, Collaboration with the Kitchen Orchestra (2008). Bombyx Mori (2011). GOLDFISH (2013). The cunning little vixen, an opera by Leoš Janáček at the Bergen National Opera, Norway (2013) Dust (2013). Wallflower a collaboration with Tel Aviv Museum of Art (2014). Wrapped Renewed Production. Originally created in 1998 (2015). Since 2008 he is the artistic director of Avshalom Pollak Dance Theatre.

In 2021 Avshalom collaborated with musician Umitaro Abe, created twelve short video-dance pieces titled "Liquid Season", all taking place in watery environments, each dedicated to a different month of the year. Water, as a field of emotions, is a platform for the creation of a world, from which we are made, and in which we create and change. The cycle of works embodies water as the element of nature and life, which makes for constant transformation. Concurrently, the cycle pays homage to the Duke of Berry's Book of Hours (The Très Riches Heures)—an illuminated Christian prayer book also serving an almanac, commissioned by Jean, Duc de Berry, in the early 15th century from the Limbourg brothers. The manuscript's illuminations portray scenes from the life of lords and peasants, against nature's changes throughout the year. "liquid Season" is presented at the Petach Tikva Museum of Art’s.

In 2021 Avshalom Played the leading role "Y" in Nadav Lapid's film Ahed's Knee. The film was selected to compete for the Palme d'Or at the 2021 Cannes Film Festival. At Cannes, the film shared the Jury Prize with Memoria by Apichatpong Weerasethakul.

In March 2023, he choreographed the Opera Bastarda, an Opera in two evenings based on the life story of Elizabeth I, an adaptation of the four operas focused on the Tudor family by Gaetano Donizetti, at La Monnaie De Munt in Brussels, Belgium.

In 2025, he directed the stage adaptation of The manga "Chi. – About the Earth's Movement -" in New National Theatre in Tokyo.

== Selected work ==
=== Acting ===
Year	Film	Role	Comment
1998	Zbeng	Shin	TV Series, 1 episode
1998	Gentila	Itzhaka'le	
1997–2000	Florentine	Tomer Shavit	TV Series, 39 episodes
2012	Prime Minister's Children	Evyata Ben Ari	TV Series
2015	Mountain	Reuven	Venice international film festival
2021	Ahed's Knee	Y	Jury Prize Cannes Film Festival

=== Choreography and Direction ===
- A chance for a 100 1994
- Wrapped 1998
- Oyster 1999
- Boobies 2002
- What Good Would the moon be 2004
- Armide 2003
- Shaker 2006
- Armide 2006
- Rushes 2007
- Hydra 2007
- Trout 2008
- Toros 2010
- Bombyx mori 2011
- Goldfish 2012
- The cunning little vixen 2013
- The cat that lived a million times 2013
- Dust 2013
- Wallflower 2014
- Wrapped 2015
- Slug 2016
- Icetree 2017
- Rashomon 2018
- Krump 2019
- Antu 2020
- Liquid season 2021
- Space Invaders 2021
- Moby D 2022
- Bastarda 2023
- Castor 2024

== Awards ==
- 2000 Israeli Theater Academy award for "Oyster"
- 2007 The Israeli Ministry of Education and Culture award for creation
- 2011 The Israeli Ministry of Education and Culture awards for Artistic achievements and performance
- 2014 The Israeli Dance Critics Circle award "Best Dance Show" for "Wallflower"
