= Stav Strashko =

Israeli model and actress (born 1992)

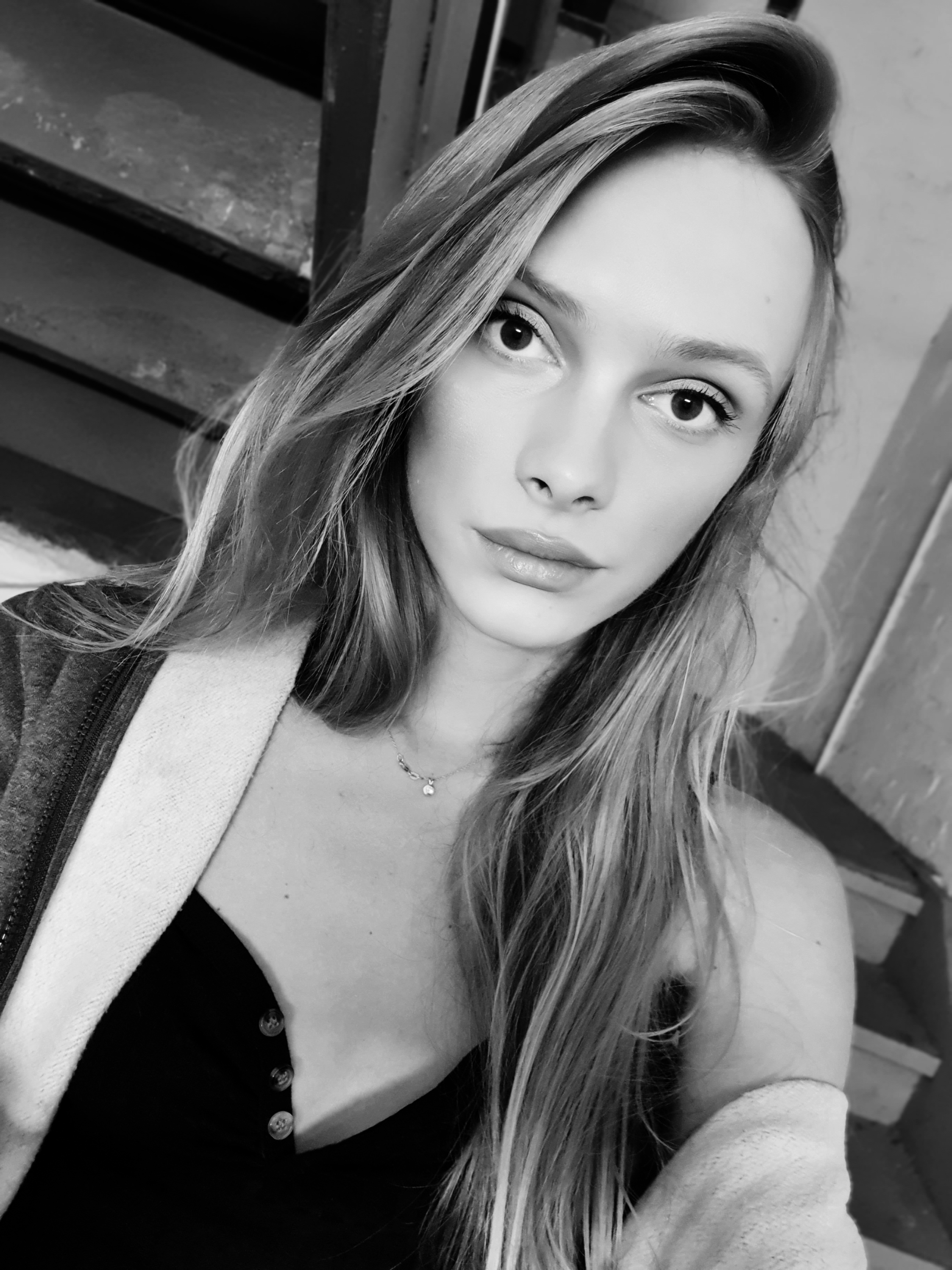
- Strashko in 2019
- Born: September 24, 1992 (age 33); Dnipro, Ukraine
- Occupations: Actress; model
- Years active: 2008–current

Stav Strashko (Hebrew: סתיו סטרשקו; born September 24, 1992) is an Israeli model and actress. She is most noted for her performance in the 2018 film Flawless, for which she became the first openly transgender actress ever to receive an Ophir Award nomination for Best Actress.

Strashko was born in Dnipropetrovsk, Ukraine, and from the age of two raised in Ramat Gan, Israel. She currently resides in Tel Aviv.
