= Inbal Pinto =

Israeli choreographer, stage designer and artistic director

- ענבל פינטו
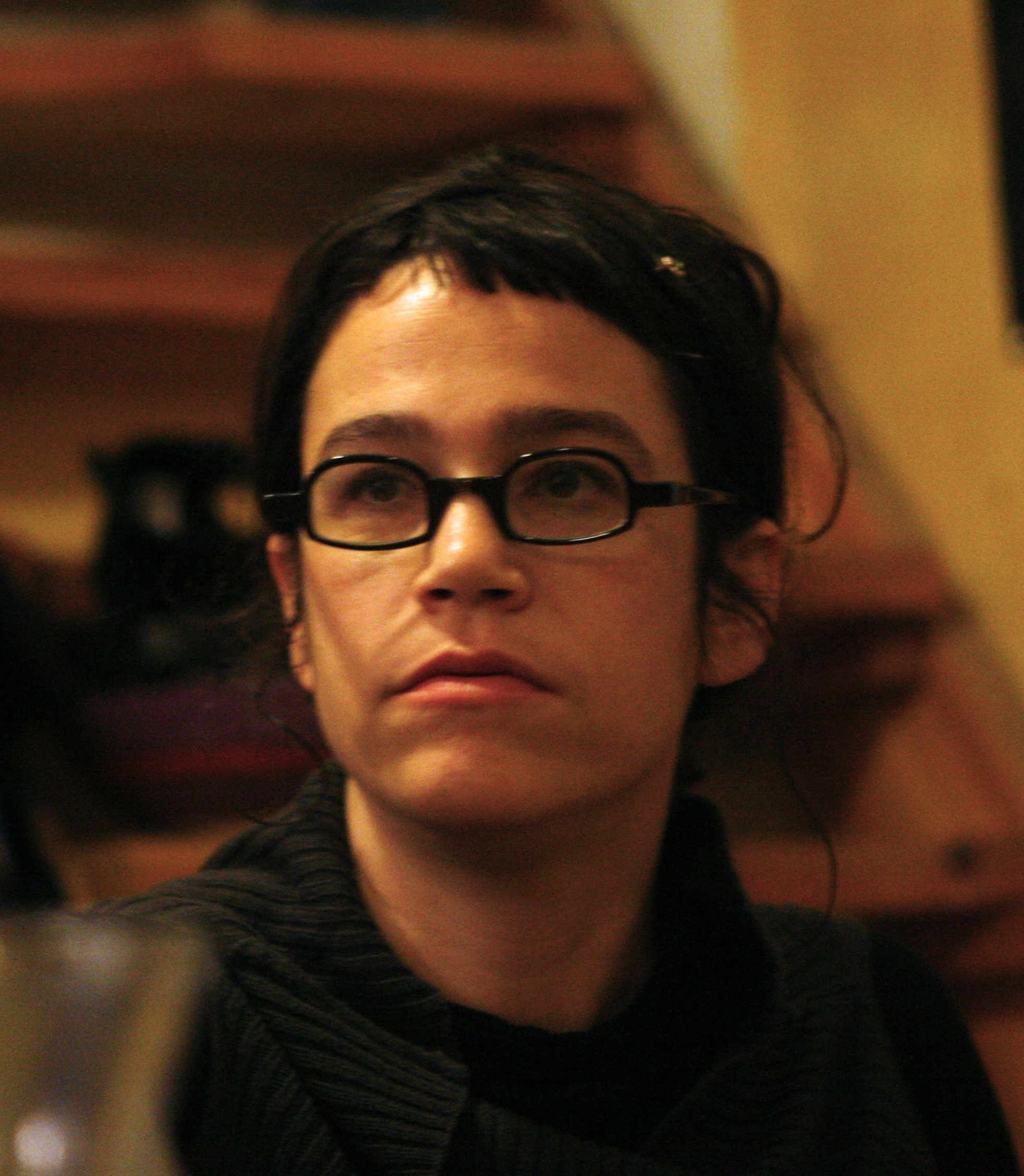
- Born: 1969; Naharia, Israel
- Occupation(s): Choreographer, director, set and costume designer, dance company artistic director

Inbal Pinto (Hebrew: ענבל פינטו; born 1969) is an Israeli contemporary dancer, choreographer, set and costume designer. She is the artistic director of the Inbal Pinto Dance Company, which she founded in 1992.

== Early life and career ==
Inbal was born in Nahariya, Israel. She studied graphic design at the Bezalel Academy of Arts and Design in Jerusalem. Her first experience as a choreographer was a collaboration with Sally-Anne Friedland for the piece "Dov Hoz 19". She joined the Young company of Batsheva Dance Company as a dancer and then danced at the main Company. Inbal was a participant at the ICCP program at the American Dance Festival in 1997 and 1998.

Pinto choreographed for classical theatre plays, such as Eugène Ionesco's “The Chairs” and Shakespeare's “Romeo and Juliet".

== Career as choreographer ==
Her first creation, “Dio-Can,” a combination of action painting and dance, won the Gvanim B’Machol Dance competition. In 1993 Pinto created “Versus” for the young Batsheva Dance Company. In 1996-97 Inbal created “Wrapped”. In the year 2000 she won the New York Dance and Performance Award (Bessie) for her outstanding performance “Wrapped”. In 1999 she created “Oyster”, a co-production of Maison de la dance Lyon for the Haifa Municipal Theatre, for which she received the Israeli Theatre Award for the best event in the Performing Arts a year later. She also won the Ministry of Culture Award for Dance in 2007, and the Tel-Aviv Municipality Award for Artistic achievement in the same year. In 2011 she won again the Ministry of Culture Award.

In 2002 Inbal began collaborating with Avshalom Pollak. The company changed its name to 'Inbal Pinto and Avshalom Pollak Dance Company'. Together they created not only dance productions, but also opera productions, such as Christoph Willibald Gluck's “Armide” in Wiesbaden and Tel-Aviv, and 2013 Leoš Janáček's “The Cunning Little Vixen” in Bergen. In 2007 Inbal and Avshalom were invited by Robby Barnett Artistic Director of Pilobolus Dance Theatre to collaborate and created "Rushes" together. In 2013 Pinto and Pollak directed, choreographed and designed the set and costumes for the musical “The Cat That Lived a Million Times”, an adaptation of a book by Yoko Sano, produced in Tokyo.

In 2018 Inbal created "Fugue" collaborating with the Composer Maya Belsitzman. Since mid-2018 Pinto works as an independent artist. In 2019 she directed together with Amir Kliger and designed the musical play based on Haruki Murakami's “The Wind-Up Bird Chronicle” in Tokyo. Between 2021 and 2022 Pinto directed and designed the opera “Pagliacci” by Ruggero Leoncavallo at the Israeli Opera, and a full evening duet, “Living Room,” for the Suzanne Dellal Center. In 2023, Pinto directed, choreographed, and designed the stage adaptation of the animated series "Future Boy Conan" by Hayao Miyazaki. She collaborated with French-Israeli director David Mambouch.

== Selected work ==
- “Dio-Can” 1992
- “Versus” 1993
- “A chance for a 100” 1994
- “Wrapped” 1998
- “Oyster” 1999
- “Boobies” 2002
- “What Good Would the moon be” 2004
- “Armide” 2003
- “Shaker” 2006
- “Armide” 2006
- “Rushes” 2007
- “Hydra” 2007
- “Trout” 2008
- “Toros” 2010
- “Bombyx mori” 2011
- “Goldfish” 2012
- "Cunning little vixen” 2013
- ”The cat that lived a million times” 2013
- "Dust" 2013
- "Wallflower" 2014
- “Wrapped” 2015 (renewed production)
- “Icetree” 2017
- ״Rashomon” 2018
- "Fugue" 2018
- “The wind- up chronicle” - 2019
- Living Room”- 2021
- “Pagliacci” - 2022
- Boulevard of broken dreams-2022
- Future Boy Conan- 2023

== Awards ==
- 2000 Bessie Award for "Wrapped"
- 2000 Israeli Theater Academy award for "Oyster"
- 2004 The landau Award for the Arts of the Stage
- 2007 The Israeli Ministry of Education and Culture award for creation
- 2011 The Israeli Ministry of Education and Culture awards for Artistic achievements and performance
- 2014 The Israeli Dance Critics Circle award "Best Dance Show” for "Wallflower"
