= List of Israeli films of 2006 =

A list of films produced by the Israeli film industry in 2006.

== 2006 releases ==
Premiere		Title	Director	Cast	Genre	Notes	Ref
J A N	26	Out of Sight (Hebrew: למראית עין)	Daniel Syrkin	Tali Sharon, Assi Dayan, Sandra Sade	Drama, Mystery		
F E B	10	Bubot Niyar (Hebrew: בובות נייר, lit. "Paper Dolls")	Tomer Heymann		Documentary	Israeli-American-Swiss co-production	
F E B	11	Forgiveness (Hebrew: סלחנות)	Udi Aloni	Itay Tiran, Clara Khoury, Moni Moshonov, Makram Khoury	Drama		
F E B	28	Janem Janem (Hebrew: ג'נאם ג'נאם)	Haim Bouzaglo		Drama		
M A Y	18	Comrade (Hebrew: בקרוב יקרה לך משהו טוב, lit. "Something Good Is Going to Happen to You Soon")	Eyal Shiray	Adam Hirsch, Assi Dayan, Tinkerbell	Drama, Action		
M A Y	20	Love & Dance (Hebrew: סיפור חצי רוסי)	Eitan Anner	Jenya Dodina, Avi Kushnir	Drama, Family, Romance	Entered into the 28th Moscow International Film Festival	
J U N	29	The Bubble (Hebrew: הבועה)	Eytan Fox	Ohad Knoller, Yousef Sweid, Daniela Virtzer, Alon Friedman	Drama, Romance		
J U L	6	Someone to Run With (Hebrew: מישהו לרוץ איתו)	Oded Davidoff	Bar Belfer	Adventure, Drama		
J U L	7	Things Behind the Sun (Hebrew: הדברים שמאחורי השמש)	Yuval Shafferman	Assi Dayan, Sandra Sade	Drama		
J U L	10	Dear Mr. Waldman (Hebrew: מכתבים לאמריקה, lit. "Letters to America")	Hanan Peled	Rami Heuberger	Drama		
J U L	11	Aviva, My Love (Hebrew: אביבה אהובתי)	Shemi Zarhin		Drama		
J U L	12	Tied Hands (Hebrew: ידיים קשורות)	Dan Wolman	Gila Almagor	Drama		
J U L	13	Three Mothers (Hebrew: שלוש אמהות)	Dina Zvi-Riklis	Miri Mesika, Gila Almagor	Drama		
J U L	13	Melah Ha'arets (Hebrew: מלח הארץ, lit. "Salt of the earth")	Uri Barbash	Lior Ashkenazi, Aki Avni, Lucy Dubinchik, Liat Glick, Limor Goldstein	Crime, Drama		
J U L	14	Dead End (Hebrew: NO אקזיט, lit. "No Exit")	Dror Sabo	Ofer Shechter, Gal Zaid, Noa Barkai, Mali Levi	Drama		
A U G	3	Little Heroes (Hebrew: גיבורים קטנים)	Itai Lev	Avigail Ariely, Tzion Baruch, Lucy Dubinchik, Dana Ivgy	Family film		
A U G	10	The Belly Dancer (Hebrew: לרקוד)	Marek Rozenbaum	Meital Dohan, Alon Aboutboul, Yuval Segal, Uri Klauzner, Moni Moshonov	Action, Drama, Crime		
A U G	31	Melanoma ahuvati (Hebrew: מלנומה אהובתי, lit. "Melanoma My Love")	Yossi (Joseph) Madmoni and David Ofek		Drama		
S E P	9	Sweet Mud (Hebrew: אדמה משוגעת, lit. "Crazy Mud")	Dror Shaul	Tomer Steinhof, Ronit Yudkevitz, Shai Avivi	Drama	Israeli-German-Japanese co-production	
S E P	12	The Galilee Eskimos (Hebrew: אסקימוסים בגליל)	Jonathan Paz	Germaine Unikovsky, Mosko Alkalai, Gabi Amrani	Comedy, Drama		
O C T	11	Nuzhat al-Fuad (Hebrew: נוזהת אל-פואד, lit. "Promenade of the Heart")	Yehuda Ne'eman	Mohammad Bakri, Efrat Gosh	Drama		

== Awards ==
=== Ophir Award ===
Category	Winners
Best Film	Aviva, My Love; Sweet Mud
Best Director	Shemi Zarhin; Aviva, My Love
Best Actor	Assi Dayan; Things Behind the Sun
Best Actress	Asi Levi; Aviva, My Love
Best Supporting Actor	Tzahi Grad; Someone to Run With
Best Supporting Actress	Rotem Abuhav; Aviva, My Love
Best Cinematography	Shai Goldman; Three Mothers
Best Screenplay	Shemi Zarhin; Aviva, My Love
Best Composer	Tsoof Philosof and Adi Renart; Sweet Mud
Best Original Score	Eli Yarkoni and Yoav Sarig; Sweet Mud
Best Documentary Feature	Shahar Cohen and Halil Efrat; Souvenirs
Lifetime Achievement Award	Nadav Levitan

=== Wolgin Award ===
Category	Winners
Best Feature Film	Dead End
Best Documentary	9 Star Hotel
Best Short Film	Road Marks
Best Screenplay	Shemi Zarhin; Aviva My Love
Best Cinematography	Shai Goldman; Three Mothers
Best Actor	Assi Dayan; Things Behind The Sun; Gal Zayed; Dead End
Best Actress	Yevgenia Dudina; Dear Mr. Waldman; Asi Levi; Aviva My Love

== Notable deaths ==
- May 11 – Yossi Banai, Israeli singer and actor. (b. 1932).

== See also ==
- 2006 in Israel
