= Mivtza Savta =

1999 Israeli satirical comedy

Operation Grandma
- Film poster
- מבצע סבתא
- Directed by: Dror Shaul
- Written by: Dror Shaul
- Produced by: Anat Bikel; Uri Sabag
- Starring: Rami Heuberger; Ami Smolartchik; Tzach Spitzen
- Cinematography: Yaron Scharf
- Edited by: Tal, Era Lapid, Tzachi Kelin
- Music by: Yishay Amir
- Distributed by: Israel Cable Programming (ICP)
- Release date: 2000
- Running time: 51 minutes
- Country: Israel
- Language: Hebrew

Operation Grandma (Hebrew: מבצע סבתא, Mivtza Savta) is a short 1999 Israeli satirical comedy about the military and kibbutz life directed by Dror Shaul. It was filmed on Kibbutz Yakum and based on the funeral of Esther Shaul (sister of Yisrael Galili). Esther was Dror's grandmother who was buried in Kibbutz Kissufim where Shaul was born and raised.

The film won the Ophir Award for Best Television Drama. Over the years, it gained significant popularity in Israel and achieved cult film status. The line "You start at your fastest and gradually increase the speed" from the film became famous and is often used humorously in Israel.

== Plot ==
Three very different brothers – Alon (34), a no-nonsense Israeli Army officer; Benni (30), a brilliant electrician; and Idan (22), a wimpy field trip guide – navigate obstacles in an attempt to bury their beloved grandmother in the cemetery of her kibbutz, the fictional Asisim. Because Alon has a secret security operation set for that same day, they have to work on a tight schedule, so he plans it like a military operation (hence the title). A series of mistakes and mishaps complicate things.

== Cast ==
- Rami Heuberger as Alon "Krembo" Sagiv
- Ami Smolartchik as Benni Sagiv
- Tzach Spitzen as Idan Sagiv
- Einat Weitzman as Hagit
- Rozina Cambos as Deborah
- Hugo Yarden as Sergio
- Danielle Miller as Christine
- Pablo Salzman as Claudio
- Gabriel Troisgros as Patrick
- Davida Karol as Haya Sagiv
- Eyal Rozales as Gabby
- Rotem Abuhav as Shirly
- Efron Etkin as Meir Cohen

== Critical reception ==
The film won a 2000 Ophir Award in the television drama category. Haaretz called it "one of the most successful Israeli comedies ever seen on the small screen", and the film has achieved cult film status in that country, primarily in Kibbutzs.
