= Longing (2024 film) =

Film by Savi Gabizon

- Canadian theatrical poster
- Directed by: Savi Gabizon
- Written by: Savi Gabizon
- Based on: Longing by Savi Gabizon
- Produced by: Daniel Bekerman; Alexander Vinnitski; Neil Mathieson
- Starring: Richard Gere; Suzanne Clément; Diane Kruger
- Cinematography: Paul Sarossy
- Edited by: Tali Halter-Shenkar
- Music by: Owen Pallett
- Production companies: Anamorphic Media; Scythia Films; Current Flow Entertainment; The Solution Entertainment Group; Telefilm Canada; Ministry of Culture and Sport
- Distributed by: Mongrel Media (Canada)
- Release date: June 7, 2024
- Running time: 111 minutes
- Countries: Canada; Israel
- Language: English

Longing is a 2024 drama film written and directed by Savi Gabizon. It stars Richard Gere, Suzanne Clément, and Diane Kruger. It is a remake of Gabizon's 2017 Israeli film.

== Premise ==
A wealthy businessman meets up with his ex-girlfriend 20 years after they broke up. She tells him that she was pregnant when she left but that their son has recently died.

== Cast ==
- Richard Gere as Daniel
- Diane Kruger as Alice
- Suzanne Clément as Rachel
- Marnie McPhail as Sonia
- Kevin Hanchard as Robert
- Stuart Hughes as Principal
- Jessica Clement

== Production ==
Filming began on September 24, 2022. Filming occurred in Toronto, Hamilton, Ontario, Cambridge, Ontario and Kitchener, Ontario.

== Release ==
Longing was released in Canada by Mongrel Media on June 7, 2024. It was also released in the United States on the same day in limited theaters by Lionsgate Films.

== Critical reception ==
Reviews for the film are generally negative.

In Variety, Alissa Simon wrote: "It seems odd that given the chance to remake his own film, Gabizon didn’t choose to make his protagonist more sympathetic or change the scenes that seem so out of tune with contemporary audiences."

Writing in The Hollywood Reporter, Frank Scheck said: "It doesn’t help that Gere delivers such a recessive, understated performance that we’re never able to connect emotionally with his character, which is as much the filmmaker’s fault as the actor’s. Instead of being drawn in by Daniel’s spiral, we observe it from a distance. The result is that Longing, presumably intended as a cathartic meditation on grief, simply feels absurd."

Javier Ocaña of El País rated the film 1 out of 5 stars, deeming it to be "the best unintentional comedy of the season".

However, in a positive review on RogerEbert.com, Nell Minnow wrote: "It would be a mistake to take this movie too literally...Gabizon is not making a documentary here or attempting any realism. Longing is a manifestation of how grief makes emotions overtake reason and the inherent resilience that sometimes requires you to come back to reality. That reality will be diminished but somehow make you whole."

On the review aggregator website Rotten Tomatoes, 29% of 28 critics' reviews are positive, with an average rating of 4.9/10. The website's consensus reads: "Despite Richard Gere's compelling turn as a grieving man, this melodrama may leave viewers longing for something more rewarding, like the filmmaker's original Israeli version." Metacritic, which uses a weighted average, assigned the film a score of 41 out of 100, based on 9 critics, indicating "mixed or average" reviews.
