= Ohad Shahar =

Israeli actor (born 1957)

- אוהד שחר
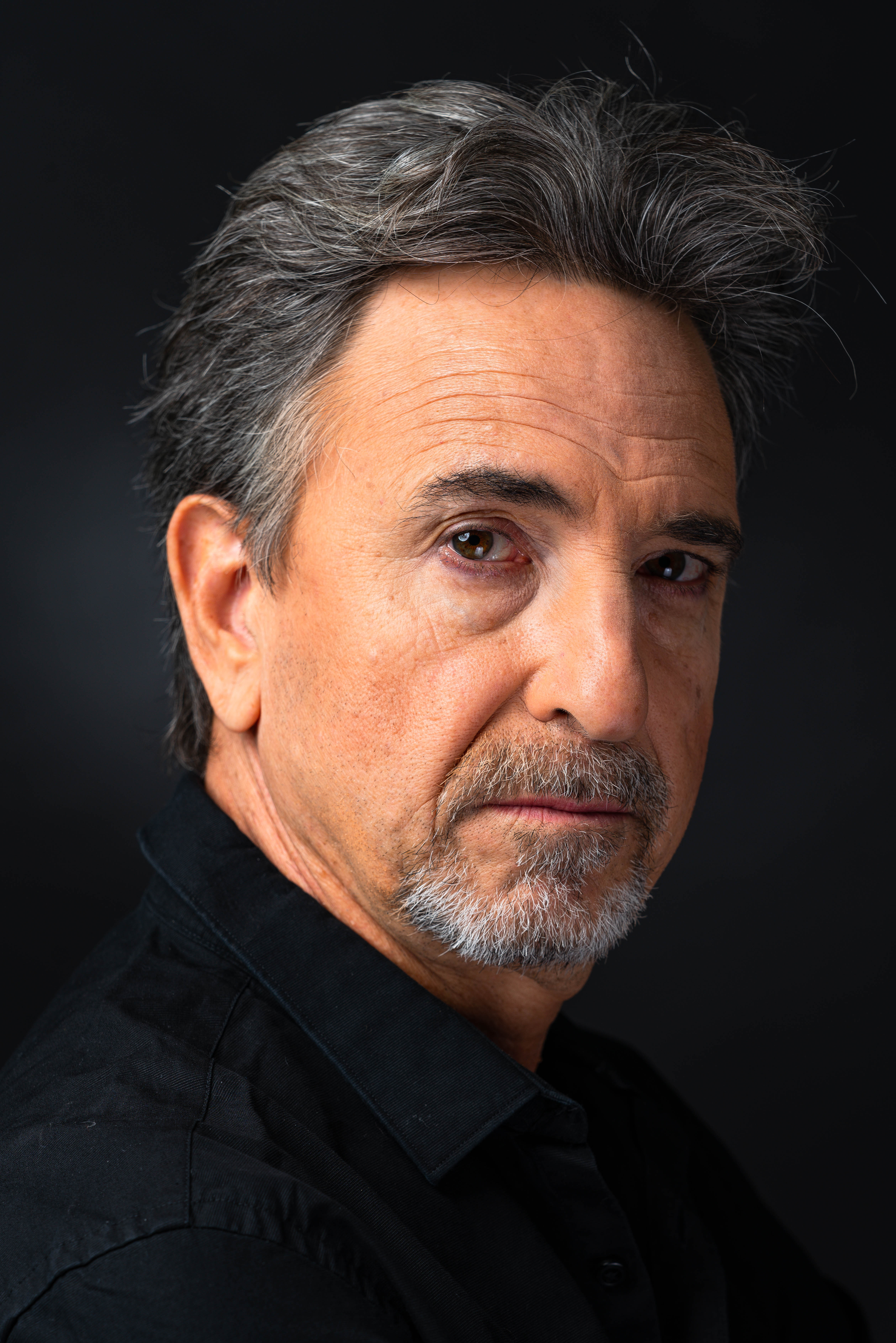
- Born: 30 October 1957 (age 68); Haifa, Israel
- Occupations: Actor; voice actor; announcer; narrator
- Years active: 1981–present
- Spouses: Anat Waxman (m. 1985; div. 2007): Maya Koupchik
- Children: 3

Ohad Shahar (Hebrew: אוהד שחר; born 30 October 1957) is an Israeli actor and voice actor.

== Biography ==
Born in Haifa, Shahar graduated from Beit Zvi School for the Performing Arts in 1981. He also went to the IDF Theatre. He performs mainly at the Tmu-na Theatre and the Cameri Theatre and has played many great roles within stage adaptations of A Midsummer Night's Dream, Who's Afraid of Virginia Woolf?, All My Sons, Kazablan and The Comedy of Errors. He also portrayed Joseph Merrick in a stage adaptation of The Elephant Man.

On screen, Shahar has appeared in the 1987 film Unsettled Land, starring Kelly McGillis. He has also appeared in the 2005 historical drama film Munich. Among his most recent screen performances was in a 2017 film directed by Doron Eran.

As a voice actor, Shahar provides the Hebrew voices of many characters and is one of Israel's most successful dubbing artists. He has worked closely with other dubbers which include Dov Reiser, Ami Mandelman, Debbi Besserglick, Efron Etkin, Gilad Kleter and more. He is the official Hebrew voice of Mickey Mouse and Bugs Bunny and among his popular voice roles include Zazu from The Lion King, Iago from Aladdin, Gru from Despicable Me, Randall Boggs from Monsters, Inc., Boomer from The Fox and the Hound, Sir Hiss from Robin Hood and he also dubbed Manny from the Ice Age franchise (except in the first film as he was voiced by Tuvia Tzafir). In his live action roles, Shahar dubbed Severus Snape from the Harry Potter film series and George Banks in Mary Poppins.

=== Personal life ===
From 1985 until 2007, Shahar was married to actress and comedian Anat Waxman and they had two children together, Yonatan and Gaia. He is now currently married to dancer Maya Koupchik and they have a daughter, Liana.

== Filmography ==
Year	Title	Role	Notes
1987	Unsettled Land	Zev	
1988	Ha-Yanshouf	Mossad agent	
1989	Point of View		
1989	Berlin-Jerusalem	Nahum	
1994	Under the Domim Tree	Lawyer Kaplan	
2004	Summer Story	Ehud	
2005	Munich	Minister #1	
2015	Afterthought	Saul	
2015	HaHefech	Ayelet's father	
2017	A New Spirit	Jeff	
2019	Mr. Kohl's Final Hour	Mr. Kohl	
2020	Tel Aviv	Ohad	
