= Let It Be Morning =

2021 Israeli drama film

- Theatrical release poster
- Directed by: Eran Kolirin
- Screenplay by: Eran Kolirin
- Based on: Let It Be Morning by Sayed Kashua
- Produced by: Ra'anan Gershoni; Keren Michael; Tamar Moses-Borovitz; Nadav Palti; Jonathan Paran
- Starring: Alex Bakri; Juna Suleiman; Salim Daw; Ehab Salami; Khalifa Natour; Samer Bisharat; Yara Elham Jarrar
- Cinematography: Shai Goldman
- Edited by: Arik Lahav-Leibovich; Haim Tabakman
- Music by: Habib Shadah
- Distributed by: Lev Cinemas; Pyramide Distribution
- Release dates: 10 July 2021 (Cannes); 17 March 2022 (Israel); 13 April 2022 (France)
- Countries: Israel; France
- Languages: Arabic; Hebrew
- Box office: $25,775

Let It Be Morning (Hebrew: ויהי בוקר, romanized: Vayehi Boker, Arabic: فليكن صباحا, romanized: faliyakun ṣabāḥan) is a 2021 drama film directed by Eran Kolirin, based on the Hebrew-language novel Let It Be Morning by Palestinian author Sayed Kashua. It was produced by Dori Media of Israel, in co-production with France's Les Films du Poisson.

The cast is predominately Palestinian and most of the language is Arabic.

In June 2021, the film was selected to compete in the Un Certain Regard section at the 2021 Cannes Film Festival. The Palestinian cast opposed the classification of the film as "Israeli," and withdrew from the Cannes Film Festival in protest. Israel selected the film as its entry for the Best International Feature Film at the 94th Academy Awards.

== Plot ==
Let It Be Morning is the story of Sami (Alex Bakri) a Palestinian-born Israeli citizen living in Jerusalem who is invited to his brother’s wedding. He has to return to the Arab village where he grew up and which he left for other opportunities. After the wedding ends, Sami's hometown is put under a military blockade lockdown by the Israeli government, without explanation. The power is cut and the villagers are trapped by an Israeli roadblock.

When chaos erupts amongst the villagers who begin to run out of food and water, Sami is also cut off from the outside world and unable to return to his work in Jerusalem. Trapped in an unexpected situation, he deals with questions about his own identity. As hidden secrets are revealed, Sami watches everything he holds dear begin to fall apart.

Written and directed by award-winning Israeli filmmaker Eran Kolirin (The Band's Visit), the film was adapted from the international best-selling novel of the same name by Palestinian author Sayed Kashua.

Let It Be Morning is a film about a state of siege, both internal and external – centered around a man who has a wall built around his heart. It explores how that inner wall starts coming apart when a physical wall is erected around his hometown.

== Cast ==
- Alex Bakri as Sami
- Juna Suleiman as Mira
- Salim Daw as Tarek
- Ehab Salami as Abed
- Khalifa Natour as Mohammed
- Samer Bisharat as Aziz
- Yara Elham Jarrar as Lina
- Izabel Ramadan as Zahera
- Doraid Liddawi as Nabil
- Maruan Hamdan as Adam
- Arin Saba as Rola
- Nadib Spadi as Ashraf

== Release ==
The film was selected to be screened in the Un Certain Regard section of the 74th Cannes Film Festival, where it had its world premiere on 10 July 2021. The film was theatrically released in Israel by Lev Cinemas on 17 March 2022. It was released in France by Pyramide Distribution on 13 April 2022.

Cohen Media Group, the US distributors of the film, released Let It Be Morning in the United States on 3 February 2023.

== Reception ==
On the review aggregator website Rotten Tomatoes, 86% of 21 critics' reviews are positive, with an average rating of 7.30/10. Metacritic, which uses a weighted average, assigned the film a score of 77 out of 100, based on 7 critics, indicating "generally favorable" reviews.

Davide Abbatescianni, of The New Arab, defined it as "an enjoyable comedy," although "it occasionally suffers from some pacing issues, especially during its last third." He praised its "solid storytelling, the good acting performances and the compelling lead character."

== See also ==
- List of submissions to the 94th Academy Awards for Best International Feature Film
- List of Israeli submissions for the Academy Award for Best International Feature Film
