= Ofira Henig =

Israeli theatre director (born 1960)

- אופירה הניג
- Born: 6 March 1960 (age 66); Ruhama, Israel
- Occupation: Theatre director
- Website: https://www.ofirahenig.com/

Ofira Henig (Hebrew: אופירה הניג; born 6 March 1960) is an Israeli theatre director. She has served as the artistic director of Jerusalem's Khan Theatre, the Israel Festival, The Laboratory in Jerusalem, and the Herzliya Theater Ensemble.

== Biography ==
Born in 1960 on Kibbutz Ruhama, Israel, Ofira Henig was the third child of the administrator Nathan (Nånoor) Hönig (born 1929 in Czechoslovakia) and rhythmics teacher Bessie née Schauffer (born 1928 in Lithuania). Her parents had immigrated to British Mandatory Palestine (modern-day Israel) from Switzerland in 1945. In 1962, the family moved to Holon. Henig attended Mitrani Municipal High School. After military service from 1979 to 1981, she studied drama at the Kibbutz College in Tel Aviv, graduating in 1986.

Her first directing projects included Peter Schaffer's Equus (1989) and Martin Sherman's Bent (1990), both of which premiered at Beit Zvi in Ramat Gan.

From 1991 to 1993, she worked as a director for Habima Theatre in Tel Aviv. In 1995, she became the artistic director of Jerusalem's Khan Theatre. She later served as the director of the Israel Festival. In 2002, she was appointed the artistic director of theater and dance for the Jerusalem International Festival, and in 2004 she took on the artistic direction of The Laboratory, a new experimental theater in Jerusalem. In 2008, she became the leader of the Herzliya Theater Ensemble.

In 2006, she staged In Spitting Distance, a one-man show written by Taher Najib and starring Khalifa Natour. The piece garnered international recognition. The play toured the world, performing at the Sydney Opera House, the Deutsches Theater in Berlin, and the Barbican Centre in London.

Her 2016 work Manmaro features Khalifa Natour and deals with the experiences of Syrian refugees.

In 2015 she was appointed as Head of Directing Department at Faculty of the Arts, Tel-Aviv University, Associate Professor.

== Selected works ==
Director

- 2016: Manmaro at the Schaubühne Berlin (starring Khalifa Natour)
- 2012: Ulysses on Bottles by Gilad Evron, Haifa Theatre
- 2008: In Spitting Distance by Taher Najib, monologue in Arabic, Sydney Opera House, Australia (starring Khalifa Natour)
- 2005: Salomé by Oscar Wilde
- 2002: The Screens by Jean Genet, Habima, Tel Aviv
- 2001: Le Retour au désert by Bernard-Marie Koltès, Khan Theatre, Jerusalem
- 1997: Yvonne, princesse de Bourgogne by Witold Gombrowicz, Khan Theatre, Jerusalem
- 1993: Hippolytus by Euripides, Habima, Tel Aviv
- 1993: Creditors by August Strindberg, Habima, Tel Aviv
- 1992: The Lower Depths by Maxim Gorki, Habima, Tel Aviv
- 1991: The Glass Menagerie de Tennessee Williams, Habima, Tel Aviv
- 1990: Bent by Martin Sherman, Beit Zvi, Ramat Gan
- 1989: Equus by Peter Shaffer, Beit Zvi, Ramat Gan

== Awards ==
- 2006 Best Performance at TheaterNETTO In Spitting Distance
- 2004 Israel Theater Prize
- 2000 Director of the Year for Back to the Desert
