= The Sea (2025 film) =

2025 Israeli drama film

- International promotional poster
- Arabic: البحر
- Hebrew: הים
- Directed by: Shai Carmeli-Pollak
- Written by: Shai Carmeli-Pollak
- Produced by: Bahr Agbariya
- Starring: Muhammad Gazawi; Khalifa Natour; Marlene Bajali
- Cinematography: Shai Goldman
- Edited by: Joseph Greenfeld
- Music by: Avi Belleli
- Production company: Majdal Films
- Release date: July 21, 2025 (Jerusalem)
- Running time: 93 minutes
- Country: Israel
- Languages: Arabic; Hebrew

The Sea (Arabic: البحر; Hebrew: הים) is a 2025 Israeli drama film written and directed by Shai Carmeli-Pollak. Starring Muhammad Gazawi as Khaled, it follows a 12-year-old Palestinian boy who tries to reach the Mediterranean Sea for the first time in his life.

The film had its world premiere at the Jerusalem Film Festival on 21 July 2025. It won five Ophir Awards, including Best Film at the 2025 ceremony, and was selected as the Israeli entry for the Best International Feature Film at the 98th Academy Awards, but it was not nominated.

== Synopsis ==
Khaled, a 12-year-old boy from Ramallah, is thrilled to join a school trip to see the sea for the first time. However, at an Israeli military checkpoint, soldiers declare his travel permit invalid and send him back, while his classmates continue on. Determined and heartbroken, Khaled sets out alone to reach the sea, despite not knowing the way or speaking Hebrew. His father, Ribhi, an undocumented laborer working in Israel, abandons his job and risks arrest to search for his missing son.

== Cast ==
- Muhammad Gazawi as Khaled
- Khalifa Natour as Ribhi
- Marlene Bajali
- Hila Surjun Fisher
- Gabriel Horn as Tamir

== Production ==
The film was produced with the fund of ₪2 million (US$598,600) from the Israel Film Foundation. It was shot in 2023. Shai Goldman served as the film's cinematographer, while Avi Belleli composed the music.

== Release ==
The Sea had its world premiere in Israeli Feature Films section on 21 July 2025, at the 42nd Jerusalem Film Festival.

The film led with 13 nominations in the 36th Ophir Awards and ultimately won the award for Best Picture. The positive reception of the film and the negative portrayal of Israel Defense Forces (IDF) soldiers led the Israeli minister of culture Miki Zohar to announce the withdrawal of government funding to the awards ceremony.

The film was presented in the 'Best of Festivals' at the 29th Tallinn Black Nights Film Festival on 13 November 2025.

The film competed in the Awards Buzz – Best International Feature Film section of the 37th Palm Springs International Film Festival in the United States on 4 January 2026.

== Accolades ==
| Year | Award | Category | Recipient | Result | Ref. |
|---|---|---|---|---|---|
| 2025 | 42nd Jerusalem Film Festival | Haggiag Award for Best Feature through the Jerusalem Foundation:Honorable Mention | The Sea | Won | |
| 2025 | 42nd Jerusalem Film Festival | Best Ensemble Award | The Sea | Won | |
| 2025 | 42nd Jerusalem Film Festival | Yossi Mulla Award for Best Original Score | Avi Belleli | Won | |
| 2025 | 36th Ophir Awards | Best Picture | The Sea | Won | |
| 2025 | 36th Ophir Awards | Best Screenplay | Shai Carmeli-Pollak | Won | |
| 2025 | 36th Ophir Awards | Best Actor | Muhammad Gazawi | Won | |
| 2025 | 36th Ophir Awards | Best Supporting Actor | Khalifa Natour | Won | |
| 2025 | 36th Ophir Awards | Best Original Score | Avi Belleli | Won | |

== See also ==
- List of submissions to the 98th Academy Awards for Best International Feature Film
- List of Israeli submissions for the Academy Award for Best International Feature Film
