= Lovesick on Nana Street =

- Film poster
- Directed by: Savi Gabizon
- Written by: Savi Gabizon
- Release date: 1995
- Running time: 94 minutes
- Country: Israel
- Language: Hebrew

Lovesick on Nana Street (translit. Hole Ahava B'Shikun Gimel) is a 1995 Israeli comedy drama film directed by Savi Gabizon. It stars Moshe Ivgi, Hana Azulay-Hasfari, Avigail Arieli and Menashe Noy. Critically acclaimed, it won the Ophir Award for Best Film, and awards internationally at Mannheim and São Paulo. The film was selected as the Israeli entry for the Best Foreign Language Film at the 68th Academy Awards, but was not accepted as a nominee.

== Plot ==
Victor (Moshe Ivgi) is a 40 year old manager of a pirate television station broadcasting from his mother's apartment in a rough neighborhood in Kiryat Yam, which he also lives in. He usually tells the residents of the neighborhood fake stories about stormy romances that he had with many women. His life changes when he falls in love with Michaela (Abigail Arieli), a young actress from Tel Aviv, who is moving in with her boyfriend (Menashe Noi) near Victor. Victor woos Michaela, but despite Victor's love for Michaela, Michaela isn't in love with him and rejects his advances. Victor stops his courtship and begins stalking Michaela as his main activity. However, Victor's life takes a turn after realizing that Michaela will never love him, leading to a breakdown and institutionalization..

== See also ==
- List of submissions to the 68th Academy Awards for Best Foreign Language Film
- List of Israeli submissions for the Academy Award for Best Foreign Language Film
