= Afterthought (film) =

- Directed by: Elad Keidan
- Written by: Elad Kedan
- Produced by: Eitan Mansuri; Elie Meirovitz
- Starring: Itay Tiran; Uri Klauzner
- Cinematography: Yaron Scharf
- Edited by: Arik Leibovitch
- Release date: 15 May 2015 (Cannes)
- Running time: 105 minutes
- Country: Israel
- Language: Hebrew

Afterthought (Hebrew: היורד למעלה, translit. Hayored lema'ala) is a 2015 Israeli philosophical comedy film written and directed by Elad Keidan. It was screened in the Special Screenings section at the 2015 Cannes Film Festival. It has been nominated for Best Film at the 2015 Ophir Awards. The film has won 3 Ophir prizes: best script, best editing, and best sound design. The film was awarded best film at the Haifa film festival.

== Cast ==
- Itay Tiran as Uri
- Uri Klauzner as Moshe
- Michaela Eshet as Na'va
- Ohad Shahar as Saul
