= Three Mothers =

Three Mothers may refer to:

- The Three Mothers, a trilogy of supernatural horror films
- Three Mothers (2006 film), an Israeli drama film
