= Asi Levi =

Israeli actress

- אסי לוי
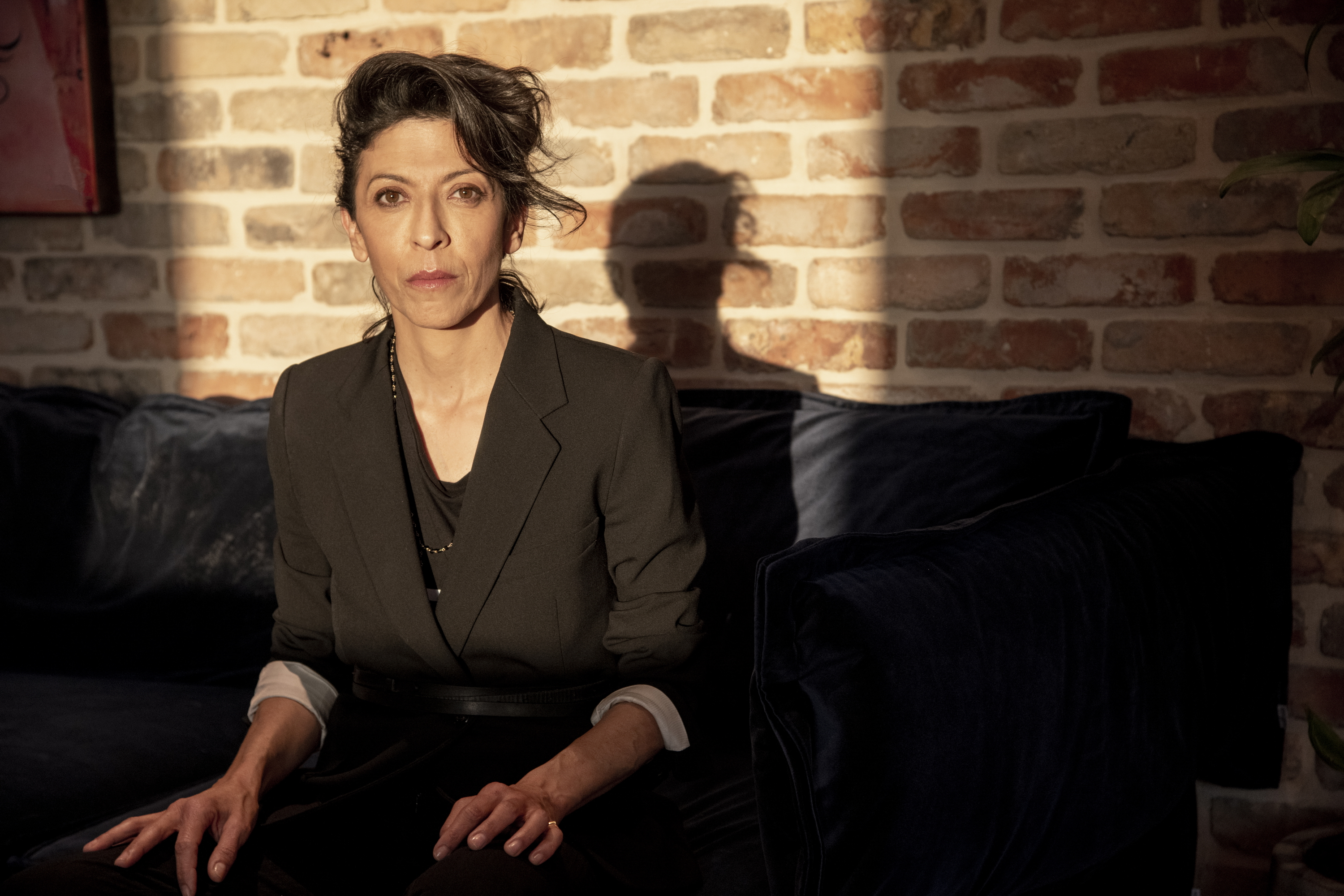
- Asi Levi in 2019
- Born: September 28, 1969 (age 57); Tel Aviv, Israel
- Occupation: Actress
- Years active: 1995–present
- Spouse: Yaniv Kaufman (2000–2006)
- Partner: Tamar Shelef
- Children: 2 daughters

Osnat "Asi" Levi (Hebrew: אסי לוי; born September 28, 1969) is an Israeli Film Academy Award winning actress.

== Career ==
Levi attended and graduated the Yoram Loewenstein Performing Arts Studio in southern Tel Aviv.

Levi's early appearances include films such as HaShiva (1995), Kesher Ir (Urban Feel; 1998) and HaBoleshet Hokeret (The Investigation Must Go On; 2000), alongside Moshe Ivgy. For the latter two she received an Israeli Film Academy Award for Best Supporting Actress. She has also appeared in several television shows, including Cafe Paris and HaBurganim.

In 2004, she played the leading role in Raphael Nadjari's film Avanim, which was presented in the Berlin Film Festival as a Panorama: Special Presentation, and also won several awards across Europe, including Best Film at the Cinema Tout Ecran in Geneva.

Her best-known appearance was in Aviva Ahuvati (Aviva, My Love), a 2006 film by Shemi Zarhin, in which she played the leading role. The film became popular in Israel and earned Levi significantly wider recognition, as well as her third Israeli Film Academy Award, this time for Best Actress.

In 2008, Levi appeared on the Israeli television series BeTipul.

== Personal life ==
Levi has two daughters with her ex-husband Yaniv Kaufman. Currently, she is in a relationship with dancer Tamar Shelef.
