= Teletext (Israel) =

Use of teletext in Israel

From 1982 to 2014, Israeli Educational Television provided the country's only Teletext (טלטקסט) service. The service was available daily on Israeli Television/Channel 1 from 8:30am to 5pm every day, as well as having an in-vision service during IETV's timeshare on the channel. During the 1980s, it was promoted as "the third channel on your TV" (הערוץ השלישי בטלוויזיה שלך).

== History ==
The teletext service was initiated in 1982 by IETV in association with the British government, which donated equipment. Its first CEO was Mickey Gur, while the technology was provided by British ambassador to Israel Jacob Lorberbaum. The first experimental pages did not come until May 1983, when an experimental service began in Israeli kindergartens. Later, in November, a trial service for sixth grade arithmetic students began. In March 1984, a pre-pilot for tenth grade English students followed, then in May, it began an electronic magazine aimed at the youth and a quiz based on the Pentateuch.

After these experiments, IETV started conducting tests for a regular teletext service. On 10 September 1985, Prime Minister Shimon Peres (in his first premiership) took part in a demonstration where, in an initial phase, the scope of content would also include updated government information. Full broadcasts began in July 1986; by late August, 5,000 teletext decoders were sold in Israel, while the number of teletext-enabled sets was at 10,000. In-vision teletext broadcasts aired twice on IETV's daytime schedule, at 9am and 2pm. The introduction of a regular teletext service featured an advertisement featuring Rotem Abuhav.

Some programs were subtitled, most notably the Friday repeat of Zehu Ze!.

Over time, Teletext Israel reduced its content. By 2004, most of its sections were removed, being limited to general information, such as news, weather, airport times and economic news; sections such as one for the hard of hearing were already removed. As of 2012, Teletext was accessible only on Channel 1 from 8:30am to 5pm (the time when IETV's Erev Hadash started.

IETV closed its teletext service in early 2014.

== Partial content ==
Partial index from the second half of the 80s:

- 123 - Lottery numbers
- 173 - Trip of the Week
- 301 and 302 - Tech
- 315 - Dollar exchange rate
- 316 - Weather
- 385 - Greetings
- 888 - Subtitles
- Unknown - a weekly passage from the Torah, sports news and the flight schedule of the Ben Gurion Airport
