= Seven Blessings (film) =

- Theatrical release poster
- שבע ברכות
- Directed by: Ayelet Menahemi
- Written by: Reymond Amsalem; Eleanor Sela
- Produced by: Leon Adri; Moshe Adri; Ronen Ben Tal
- Starring: Reymond Amsalem
- Cinematography: Boaz Yehonatan Yaacov
- Edited by: Ayelet Menahemi
- Music by: Michael Legum
- Production companies: Ronen Ben-Tal Films; United King Films
- Release date: September 7, 2023
- Running time: 108 minutes
- Country: Israel
- Languages: Arabic; Hebrew; French

Seven Blessings (Hebrew: שבע ברכות, romanized: Sheva Brachot) is a 2023 Israeli comedy-drama film directed by Ayelet Menahemi. It stars Reymond Amsalem who co-wrote the screenplay with Eleanor Sela. The film's title is a reference to Sheva Brachot. It was released on 7 September 2023 in Israeli theaters. The film won 10 Ophir Awards including Best Picture, Best Director, Best Actress for Reymond Amsallem, Best Supporting Actress for Tikva Dayan and Best Screenplay.

It was officially selected as the Israeli entry for the Best International Feature Film at the 96th Academy Awards.

== Synopsis ==
Set in the early 90's in Jerusalem. At the center is a boisterous and drama-filled Jewish-Moroccan family, with numerous members speaking multiple languages (Hebrew, Arabic, French, and French-Moroccan dialect). However, behind the facade of joie de vivre and togetherness hide secrets, lies and an old and painful wound from the past.

== Cast ==
- Reymond Amsallem as Marie
- Tikva Dayan as Hana
- Eleanor Sela as Irit
- Rivka Bahar as Gracia
- Eran Mor as Dan
- Daniel Sabag
- Yael Levental
- Idit Teperson
- Anna Baziz
- Yogev Keinan
- Yoav Levi
- Emanuel Busidan
- Morin Amor
- Hila Di Castro
- Stav Magen
- Sylvain Biegeleisen

== Accolades ==
Year	Award	Category	Recipient	Result	Ref.
2023	Ophir Award	Best Picture	Seven Blessings	Won	
2023	Ophir Award	Best Director	Ayelet Menahemi	Won	
2023	Ophir Award	Best Actress	Reymond Amsalem	Won	
2023	Ophir Award	Best Supporting Actress	Tikva Dayan	Won	
2023	Ophir Award	Best Screenplay	Reymond Amsalem & Eleanor Sela	Won	
2023	Ophir Award	Best Cinematography	Boaz Yehonatan Yaacov	Nominated	
2023	Ophir Award	Best Editing	Ayelet Menahemi	Won	
2023	Ophir Award	Best Art Direction	Amir Yaron	Nominated	
2023	Ophir Award	Best Costume Design	Inbal Shuki	Won	
2023	Ophir Award	Best Makeup	Orly Ronen	Won	
2023	Ophir Award	Best Casting	Orit Fouks Rotem	Won	
2023	Ophir Award	Best Soundtrack	Aviv Aldema & Michael Legum	Won	
2024	Warsaw Jewish Film Festival	Best Narrative Feature	Seven Blessings	Nominated	
2024	Warsaw Jewish Film Festival	Grand Prix-POLIN	Seven Blessings	Nominated	

The recipient of the Best Narrative Feature Award at the 2024 Atlanta Jewish Film Festival.

== See also ==
- List of submissions to the 96th Academy Awards for Best International Feature Film
- List of Israeli submissions for the Academy Award for Best International Feature Film
