= Mike Alfreds =

English theatre director, adapter, writer and translator

Michael Alfreds (born 5 June 1934) is an English theatre director, adaptor, translator and teacher.

== Biography ==
Michael Alfreds was born in London in 1934 and trained as a director at Carnegie Mellon University in Pittsburgh.

He lived in the United States for eight years (1954–1962), during which time he worked for MGM Studios in Hollywood, was artistic director of Theatre West, Tucson, and then of the Cincinnati Playhouse in the Park. For five years he worked in Israel (1970–1975), where he became the artistic director of the Jerusalem Khan Theatre and contributed immensely to its development.

In the UK, Alfreds founded Shared Experience in 1975 and ran it for thirteen years. He worked as a director at the Royal National Theatre between 1985 and 1988, and was an associate and artistic director of the Cambridge Theatre Company, later renamed Method and Madness, from 1991 to 1999. He has directed for Shakespeare's Globe, Royal Shakespeare Company, and for several regional repertory theatres.

As well as the USA and Israel, Alfreds has worked in Canada, Australia, New Zealand, Germany, Norway, France, Italy, Mongolia and China. He has staged over two hundred productions, and won awards both internationally and in the UK. He has translated the texts of several of his productions and has also specialised in the adaptation of novels and stories for the stage and has developed techniques for storytelling in the theatre.

Alfreds has written three books on his working methods: Different Every Night, which deals with his rehearsal processes for plays; Then What Happens, concerning his methods of working on adaptations; and What Actors Do, which is a philosophy of his process. He has divided his career between directing and teaching acting and directing. Alfreds is known for his special method of working with actors, inspired amongst others by the principles of Constantin Stanislavski and Rudolf Laban, with emphasis on physical work, scrupulous analysis of text, spontaneity and interaction with others during the play in minimalistic productions.

== Teaching ==
Alfreds began teaching acting and directing at the London Opera Centre and taught at the London Academy of Music and Dramatic Art (LAMDA) in London from 1965 to 1970. He later served as a senior lecturer in drama at the University of Tel Aviv from 1971 to 1973.

Alfreds has conducted workshops and masterclasses globally, including locations such as St Andrews, Melbourne, Wellington, and Beijing, covering various techniques such as storytelling, melodrama, and the methods of Chekhov and Stanislavski.

He has collaborated with theatre companies like the Royal Shakespeare Company and the Royal National Theatre, and worked with the Shakespeare Festival Theatre in Canada and the Actors Studio in New York.

Alfreds has also taught dance and choreography workshops, contributing to theatre education through training courses and workshops for organisations worldwide.

== Productions ==
Year	Production	Company / Theatre
1955	Hello From Bertha, Williams	Brentwood Playhouse, Los Angeles
1956	The Death of Manolete, Conrad adaptation	Brentwood Playhouse, Los Angeles
1956	The Human Voice, Cocteau	Brentwood Playhouse, Los Angeles
1956	One, Two, Three, Molnar	Brentwood Playhouse, Los Angeles
1957	The Epidemic, Mirbeau	Carnegie Mellon, Pittsburgh
1957	The Tenor, Wedekind	Carnegie Mellon, Pittsburgh
1957	The Understanding, Alfreds	Carnegie Mellon, Pittsburgh
1957	Blithe Spirit, Coward	Carnegie Mellon, Pittsburgh
1957	The Beaux Arts Revue, Alfreds/Cohen	Carnegie Mellon, Pittsburgh
1957	Keep An Eye On Amelie, Feydeau	Carnegie Mellon, Pittsburgh
1958	Montserrat, Robles/Hellman	Summer Stock, Kennebunkport, Maine
1958	Guys and Dolls, Loesser	Carnegie Mellon, Pittsburgh
1958	Kiss Me, Kate, Porter	Carnegie Mellon, Pittsburgh
1958	La Perichole, Offenbach	Carnegie Mellon, Pittsburgh
1958	Lakme, Delibes	Carnegie Mellon, Pittsburgh
1958	The Secret Marriage, Cimarsoa	Carnegie Mellon, Pittsburgh
1958	The Land of Smiles, Lehar	Carnegie Mellon, Pittsburgh
1958	Gallantry, Moore	Carnegie Mellon, Pittsburgh
1958	The Merry Wives of Windsor, Nicolai	Carnegie Mellon, Pittsburgh
1959	Annie Get Your Gun, Berlin	Carnegie Mellon, Pittsburgh
1959	Die Fledermaus, Strauss	Carnegie Mellon, Pittsburgh
1959	The Most Happy Fella, Loesser	Carnegie Mellon, Pittsburgh
1959	The Merry Widow, Lehar	Carnegie Mellon, Pittsburgh
1959	Madama Butterfly, Puccini	Carnegie Mellon, Pittsburgh
1960	Thieves' Carnival, Anouilh	Winter Stock, Theatre West, Tucson, Arizona
1960	Enrico IV, Pirandello	Winter Stock, Theatre West, Tucson, Arizona
1961	Volpone, Romains/Zweig/Jonson	Cincinnati Playhouse-In-The Park
1961	A View From the Bridge, Miller	Cincinnati Playhouse-In-The Park
1961	Under Milk Wood, Thomas	Cincinnati Playhouse-In-The Park
1961	The Seagull, Chekhov	Cincinnati Playhouse-In-The Park
1961	La Ronde, Schnitzler	Cincinnati Playhouse-In-The Park
1961	The Bald Soprano/The Chairs, Ionesco	Cincinnati Playhouse-In-The Park
1962	Hedda Gabler, Ibsen	Cincinnati Playhouse-In-The Park
1962	The Servant of Two Masters, Goldoni	Cincinnati Playhouse-In-The Park
1962	Heartbreak House, Shaw	Cincinnati Playhouse-In-The Park
1962	No Exit, Sartre	Cincinnati Playhouse-In-The Park
1962	The Lark, Anouilh/Hellman	Cincinnati Playhouse-In-The Park
1962	Here Today, Gone Tomorrow, new play - Shapiro	Cincinnati Playhouse-In-The Park
1962	Hamlet, Shakespeare	Cincinnati Playhouse-In-The Park
1963	Photo Finish, Ustinov	Churchill, Bromley
1963	Les Liaisons Dangereuses, Laclos	Frinton/Cambridge Arts
1964	La Traviata, Verdi	Welsh National Opera Tour
1964	Die Fledermaus, Strauss	Opera Players
1964	La Boheme, Puccini	British Opera Company
1964	La Traviata, Verdi	British Opera Company
1967	Busybody, Popplewell	Marlowe Theatre, Canterbury
1967	Lady, Be Good, Gershwin	Marlowe Theatre, Canterbury
1968	The Government Inspector, Gogol	Theatre Royal, Lincoln
1968	A Funny Thing Happened On The Way To The Forum, Sondheim	Theatre Royal, Lincoln
1968	A Day In The Death of Joe Egg, Nichols	Marlowe Theatre, Canterbury
1968	The Servant of Two Masters, Goldoni	Marlowe Theatre, Canterbury
1968	The Misanthrope, Moliere	Marlowe Theatre, Canterbury
1968	Dear Departed Mother In Law, Feydeau	Marlowe Theatre, Canterbury
1969	Marriage	Cameri Theatre, Tel Aviv, Israel
1970	Mandragola	Haifa Theatre, Israel
1971	The House of Bernarda Alba, Lorca	Khan Theatre, Jerusalem
1971	Asses, from Platus	Haifa Theatre, Israel
1972	1001 Nights	Tel Aviv
1972	The Persian Protocols, devised from The Book of Esther	Khan Theatre, Jerusalem
1972	Woyzeck, Buchner	Khan Theatre, Jerusalem
1973	One City, devised documentary about Jerusalem	Khan Theatre, Jerusalem
1973	Fumed Oak, Coward / The Music Cure Shaw	Khan Theatre, Jerusalem
1973	The Proposal/The Jubilee, Chekhov	Khan Theatre, Jerusalem
1973	The Book of Jonah	Israeli Television
1973	Two Hassidic Tales, Buber	Israeli Television
1974	Offending The Audience, Handke	Khan Theatre, Jerusalem
1974	The Servant of Two Masters, Goldoni	Khan Theatre, Jerusalem
1975	The Cherry Orchard, Chekhov	Khan Theatre, Jerusalem
1975 - 1977	Arabian Nights Trilogy, stories from the 10001 Nights	Shared Experience, (Crucible, Sheffield)
1977 - 1978	Bleak House, 4-part production of novel by Dickens	Shared Experience
1978 - 1979	Science Fictions, improvised clown show	Shared Experience
1979	Cymbeline, Shakespeare	Shared Experience
1981	The Merchant of Venice, Shakespeare	Shared Experience
1981	The Seagull, Chekhov	Shared Experience
1982	La Ronde, Schnitzler	Shared Experience
1982	The Cherry Orchard, Chekhov	Shared Experience
1982	A Handful of Dust, novel by Evelyn Waugh	Shared Experience
1983	Suitcase Packers, an Israeli play by Hanoch Levine	Cameri Theatre, Tel Aviv, Israel
1983	Le Theatre des Nations, Nancy	Shared Experience - Performed at the Edinburgh Fringe in 1985
1983	The Comedy Without a Title, 4 plays by Ruzante	Shared Experience
1983	False Admissions, Marivaux	Shared Experience
1983	Successful Strategies, Marivaux	Shared Experience
1984	Marriage, Gogol	Shared Experience
1984	1001 Nights	Theater der Stadt Heidelberg, Germany
1984	False Admissions, Marivaux	Taragon Theatre, Toronto, Canada
1985	The Cherry Orchard, Chekhov	Royal National Theatre (Best Director-BTA/DRAMA & Plays and Players Awards)
1986	The Three Sisters, Chekhov	Shared Experience
1986	Too True To be Good, George Bernard Shaw	Shared Experience
1986	Arabian Nights	Nationale Scene, Bergen, Norway
1987	The Wandering Jew, novel by Eugene Sue	Royal National Theatre
1987	Countrymania, Goldoni trilogy	Royal National Theatre
1988	Blood Wedding, Lorca	Tarragon Theatre, Toronto & Banff Centre, Canada
1988	A Streetcar Named Desire, Williams	Tianjin People's Art Theatre, China
1989	Ghosts, Ibsen	Beersheba Municipal Theatre, Israel
1990	The Miser, Molière	Oxford Stage Company
1990	Trouble In Paradise, devised show.	Talking Pictures
1991	The Seagull, Chekhov	Oxford Stage Company
1991	Marriage, Gogol	Theatre der Stadt Heidelberg, Germany
1991	The Country Wife, Wycherley	Cambridge Theatre Company
1991	Lady Windermere's Fan, Oscar Wilde	Cambridge Theatre Company
1992	The Revenger's Tragedy, Tourneur	Cambridge Theatre Company
1992	The Game of Love and Chance, Marivaux	Co-Director; Cambridge Theatre Company
1993	The Hypochondriac, Molière	Cambridge Theatre Company
1993	The Dearly Beloved, new play by Philip Osment	Cambridge Theatre Company
1993	A Flea In Her Ear, Feydeau	Theatre Clwyd/West Yorkshire Playhouse
1993	Les Enfants Du Paradis, film of Carné & Prévert.	Co-Director; Cambridge Theatre Co.
1994	A Handful of Dust, Evelyn Waugh Revival	Cambridge Theatre Company
1994	Uncle Silas, novel by Joseph Sheridan Le Fanu	Cambridge Theatre Company
1994	Emma, novel by Jane Austen	Cambridge Theatre Company
1995	What I Did In The Holidays, new play by Philip Osment	Cambridge Theatre Company
1995	Jude The Obscure, novel by Thomas Hardy	Method & Madness (Best Director TMA Awards)
1996	Private Lives, Noël Coward	Method & Madness (Best Director TMA Awards)
1996	Flesh and Blood, new play by Philip Osment	Method & Madness (Best Director TMA Awards)
1996	Ghosts, Ibsen	Method & Madness
1997	The Winter's Tale, Shakespeare	Method & Madness
1998	Cherry Orchard, Chekhov	Method & Madness
1998	Demons & Dybbuks, stories by Isaac Bashevis Singer	Method & Madness
1998	The Black Dahlia, novel by James Elroy	Method & Madness
1999	Buried Alive, new play by Philip Osment	Method & Madness
2000	Demons & Dybbuks, Bashevis Singer	Cameri Theatre, Tel Aviv
2001	Buried Alive, Philip Osment	Hampstead Theatre
2001	Cymbeline, Shakespeare	Shakespeare's Globe
2002	Cymbeline, Shakespeare	Brooklyn Academy of Music
2002	A Midsummer Night's Dream, Shakespeare	Shakespeare's Globe
2002	The Comedy of Errors, Shakespeare	Dartmouth College, New Hampshire
2003	Collateral Damage, on the Oklahoma City Bombing; devised with Osment	LAMDA
2003	The Black Dahlia, novel by James Ellroy	Yale Repertory Theater
2003	Collateral Damage	LAMDA
2004	Twelfth Night, Shakespeare	Rutgers University at Shakespeare's Globe
2004	Pedro, The Great Pretender, Cervantes	Royal Shakespeare Company; The Swan
2005	Troilus and Cressida, Shakespeare	Rutgers University at Shakespeare's Globe
2005	Pedro, The Great Pretender, Cervantes	Royal Shakespeare Company; The Swan
2006	Much Ado About Nothing, Shakespeare	Rutgers University at Shakespeare's Globe
2007	The Winter's Tale, Shakespeare	Rutgers University at Shakespeare's Globe
2008	Cymbeline, Shakespeare	Rutgers University at Shakespeare's Globe
2011	The Tin Ring, Zdenka Fantlova Erlich/Jane Arnfield	Northern Stage/Lowry Centre/The Houses of Parliament/World Tour
2014	Blood Wedding, Lorca	East 15 School of Acting
2014	The Comedy of Errors, Shakespeare	Guildhall School of Music & Drama
2015	Twelfth Night, Shakespeare	Guildhall School of Music & Drama
2016	Dealer's Choice, Patrick Marber	Guildhall School of Music & Drama
2016	The Crucible, Miller	Guildhall School of Music & Drama
2018	The Three Sisters, Chekhov	Central School of Speech & Drama
2018	Year of Wonders, Geraldine Brooks	Lowry Centre
2023	Five Characters in Search of a Good Night's Sleep, devised with the company	Visible Theatre, Southwark Playhouse

== Awards ==
- Kinoor David (David's Harp) Award (Israel), Best Director/Production: Mandragola, Haifa Theatre 1971; Suitcase Packers, Cameri Theatre 1984
- The Israeli Culture & Arts Council Theatre Award: Mandragola, Haifa Theatre 1971; The Persian Protocols, Khan Theatre 1973
- BTA/DRAMA Award, Best Revival: The Seagull, Shared Experience 1982
- BTA/DRAMA Award & Plays and Players Award, Best Director: The Cherry Orchard, National Theatre 1986
- Writer's Guild, Best New Regional Play: The Dearly Beloved, 1993
- TMA Awards, Best Director, for Jude the Obscure, Private Lives and Flesh and Blood, 1996
- Honorary Fellowship of London Guildhall (HonFGS) 2014.

== Bibliography (selection) ==
- A Shared experience: The actor as story-teller Series: Theatre papers. Published 1980 by Dartington College of Arts
- The Wandering Jew by Michelene Wandor, Mike Alfreds. Published 27 May 1988 by Heinemann Educational Books.
- Different Every Night: Freeing the Actor, Published 1 April 2008 by Nick Hern Books ISBN 978-1-85459-967-4
- Then What Happens? Storytelling & Adapting for Theater. Published 2013 by Nick Hern Books, ISBN 978-1-84842-270-4 Published 21 August 2014 by Nick Hern Books.
- The Surprise of Love by Pierre Carlet De Marivaux, translated by Mike Alfreds. Published 2011 by Oberon Books, ISBN 978-1-84943-183-5.
- What Actors Do, Published 2024 by Nick Hern Books.

Books:

- Different Every Night: Freeing the Actor, Nick Hern Books 2007. An account of his rehearsal processes with actors.
- Then What Happens? Storytelling & Adapting for the Theatre, Nick Hern Books, 2013. An account of his work on material not originally conceived for the stage.
- What Actors Do - Advice to the Players in Seven Paradoxes and a Manifesto, Nick Hern Books, 2024.

Translation:

- The Surprise of Love by Marivaux, published by Oberon Books for The Theatre Royal Bath, 2011.

Adaptation:

- The Wandering Jew, co-adapted with M. Wandor from the novel by Eugene Sue. Methuen, 1987.

== Memberships ==
- Arts Council Drama Panel, 1981–1985
- Working Party of Gulbenkian Foundation Enquiry into Director
- Training and Report: "A Better Direction", 1987–1989
- Management Committee of the Actors Centre, 1988
- Director: Board of Almeida Theatre, 1982–1989
- Director: Board of Shared Experience, 1975–1998
- Director: Board of David Glass Ensemble, 1990–1994
- Director: Board of Odyssey Theatre, 1992–1993
- Member of Council: Directors Guild of Great Britain, 1995–1996
- Director: Board of Unicorn Theatre for Children, 2000–2002
