= Anat Waxman =

Israeli actress and comedian (born 1961)

- ענת וקסמן
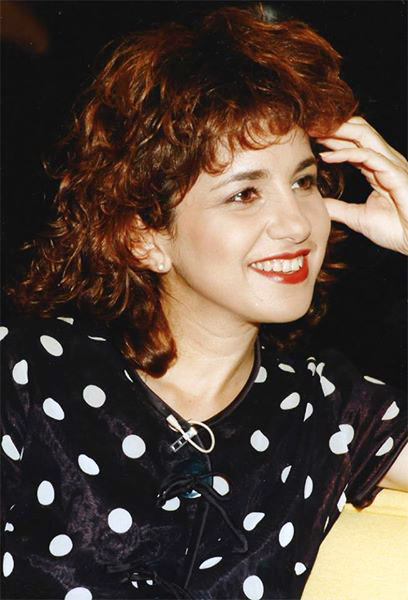
- Waxman in 1992
- Born: 26 June 1961 (age 64); Jaffa, Israel
- Occupations: Actress; voice actress; comedian
- Years active: 1984–present
- Spouse: Ohad Shahar (m. 1985; div. 2007)
- Children: 2
- Relatives: Yossi Waxman (brother)

Anat Waxman (Hebrew: ענת וקסמן; born 26 June 1961) is an Israeli actress and comedian.

== Biography ==
Born in Jaffa, Waxman and her family relocated to Jerusalem when she was five years old, where she spent the remainder of her childhood. Through her father, her family originated in Jerusalem for ten generations and she is a descendant of Shneur Zalman of Liadi while her mother emigrated to Israel from Iraq. While in high school, she took part as a presenter on a television youth program and eventually, she moved to Tel Aviv and studied at Beit Zvi School for the Performing Arts.

On stage, Waxman started out acting at the Beersheba Theatre in 1986 and was featured in a number of plays and performances. She has also acted at the Cameri Theatre, the Haifa Theatre and the Beit Lessin Theatre and starred in numerous adaptations of plays such as Don Juan Comes Back From The War, A Midsummer Night's Dream, The House of Bernarda Alba, The Bourgeois Gentleman, A Doll's House and many more. However, Waxman’s most notable stage appearance to date was her performance in the lead role of Anat Gov’s award winning play Happy Ending.

On film, Waxman made her breakthrough performance in the 1986 film Million Dollar Madness featuring Sefi Rivlin. She has also been featured in I Don't Give a Damn which was released the following year, as well as the 1992 film Tel Aviv Stories and the 2003 film Nina's Tragedies all of which drew her to the public eye. On television, she is noted for her role as Dafna Ringel in the sitcom Life is Not Everything. As a dubber, Waxman has dubbed numerous characters from international films into the Hebrew language. She notably voiced the title character in the Hebrew dub of Nanny McPhee and the sequel.

Waxman is known for her support for the left side of the political spectrum. In April 2015, Waxman came under heavy criticism for making scornful comments on a Channel 2 interview about right-wing supporters, saying that they are irrational voters. Waxman apologised for her comments, stating she was simply worried about the country and cited her Iraqi-Jewish heritage to deny any tendencies that relate to racism.

=== Personal life ===
Waxman is the younger sister of writer Yossi Waxman. She was also once married to actor and voice dubbing artist Ohad Shahar from 1985 until 2007 and they have two children together, Yonatan and Gaia.

Waxman currently holds the record for the winner of most Ophir Awards along with Ronit Elkabetz and Dana Ivgy.

In 2025, Waxman revealed in an interview that she had struggled with clinical depression for two years.
