= Kissufim massacre =

2023 massacre in Israel

- Part of the October 7 attacks
- Site of the attack in Israel
- Native name: הטבח בכיסופים
- Location: 31°22′27″N 34°23′58″E; Kissufim, Southern District, Israel
- Date: 7 October 2023; 3 years ago
- Attack type: Mass shooting, mass murder, war crime
- Deaths: 10 civilians killed 8 IDF soldiers killed 4 kibbutz security members killed
- Victim: At least 4 taken hostage
- Perpetrators: Palestinian Joint Operations Room: Hamas; Democratic Front for the Liberation of Palestine (National Resistance Brigades)

During the October 7 attacks, Hamas militants from the Gaza Strip targeted Kissufim, a kibbutz located in the Southern District of Israel. At least four kibbutz security team members, four other residents, six Thai laborers and eight Israeli soldiers were killed. At least four individuals were additionally abducted and taken to Gaza.

== Background ==
Kissufim is a kibbutz, a small farming collective with 300 residents. It is located close to the Kissufim crossing into the Gaza Strip, which was the main route for traffic to the Israeli settlement bloc in the strip prior to Israel's withdrawal from the territory in 2005.

=== Preceding events ===
On the morning of 7 October 2023, Hamas launched a surprise attack on Israel. Hamas fired thousands of rockets at Israeli targets and sent hundreds of militants to infiltrate Israeli military facilities and communities, where they clashed with security forces.

== Massacre ==
On 7 October 2023, at least 70 Hamas fighters entered Kibbutz Kissufim. Another Palestinian militant group, the Maoist DFLP, also declared that its troops (organized as National Resistance Brigades) were fighting the IDF in Kissufim. The militants entered the town at about 6:30am shouting "IDF, IDF" to make the residents feel at ease, and deceive them into thinking Israeli soldiers were entering the town instead. The militants were dressed in Israeli military garb. Some civilians who walked up to the militants were shot at. Several civilians fled into local bunkers, with one survivor stating she assumed it was the occasional rocket fire. During the attack, a 90-year-old woman was reportedly dragged from her home's safe room into the living and killed by a gunshot to the head. A couple and their 15-year-old son refused militants' demands to come out of their house and were burned alive when militants set it on fire.

Throughout the attack, the kibbutz's security team fought back, with four members of the team being killed during the clashes. A platoon from the 51st Battalion of the Golani Brigade of the IDF arrived eventually, becoming engaged in a battle with the militants that lasted for several hours. The town's buildings suffered heavy damage. Survivors trapped in their homes were evacuated by IDF soldiers in the late afternoon. Ten civilians were killed during the attack, including six Thai workers.

The Israeli government declared the border towns in the Gaza envelope an active military zones after the 7 October attack, closing off Kissufim and evacuating its remaining residents. On Saturday night, the kibbutz residents were evacuated to a hotel on the shores of the Dead Sea.

On 10 October, the kibbutz dairy farm manager entered Kissufim with the IDF's permission in order to feed the cows for the first time in about 60 hours. A militant who was hiding at the milking parlor killed him. Five days after the attack, a militant who had survived the battle and hid in one of the houses opened fire on IDF troops, wounding three before being killed.

== IDF investigation ==
An IDF investigation was published in May 2025. The report praised Israeli security forces for successfully stopping the attack and securing the area, although it criticized the amount of time it took to do so. Additionally, the report outlined issues with the military's conduct, including lack of coordination and inadequate training. There were multiple friendly fire incidents, one of which killed an Israeli civilian named Tom Godo when he was trying to hide in his home with his wife and three daughters and another which wounded a soldier. The report stated that: "The IDF failed to protect the kibbutz and its residents." Godo's wife, Limor Havalda, stated on Channel 13 that "It turned out that those who killed Tom were IDF soldiers."

== See also ==
- Gaza war
- Outline of the Gaza war
- List of military engagements during the Gaza war
- Palestinian political violence
- Kiryat Shmona massacre
- Moshe Dayan's eulogy for Ro'i Rothberg
- List of massacres in Israel
