= Aviva, My Love =

- Directed by: Shemi Zarhin
- Starring: Asi Levi; Rotem Abuhav
- Release date: 27 July 2006
- Running time: 1h 47min
- Country: Israel
- Language: Hebrew

Aviva, My Love (Hebrew: אביבה אהובתי) is a 2006 Israeli drama film directed by Shemi Zarhin. The film was regarded as a major Israeli success, attracting 300,000 viewers to cinemas.

The film won six Ophir Awards, including Best Actress for Asi Levi and Best Picture (which it shared with the film Sweet Mud). It also received two Wolgin Awards, the Chicago Film Festival Award, and the Shanghai Film Festival Award.

== Plot ==
Aviva Cohen (Asi Levi) works as a cook in a hotel in Tiberias, but she has dreamed for years of being a writer. She draws ideas for her stories from her life. She carries a small notebook and at every opportunity she records small events that happen to her and she later weaves them into her stories. With the help of her sister Anita, who lives next door, Aviva goes to Oded Zer (Sasson Gabai), a well-known writer living in Tel Aviv, who reads her works and promises to help her achieve her dream. The path to achieving her dreams is influenced by Aviva's life with her unemployed husband, Muni, her three teenage children: Osherat (Dana Ivgy) who is a soldier, Alon, and Ofek; her troubled mother, Violet, and her sister Anita.

In a difficult financial situation, Zer offers her a deal whose effects on her life she doesn't really understand. At the same time the owner of the hotel restaurant also offers to rehire her as a cook. However, her sister, Anita, intervenes in her life, until the point where Aviva accidentally witnesses her husband Muni cheating on her with Anita, which hurts Aviva deeply. Everybody around her worries about Anita, because she left her works with the writer, who is about to go abroad. Aviva must make decisions which are better for her: the money or the artistic work.

== Production ==
Much of the film's plot was filmed in Tiberias, with its landscapes prominently featured in the movie. The film's premiere was planned to take place in Tiberias and did indeed occur there. However, since Tiberias was under the threat of rockets during the Second Lebanon War at the scheduled time, the screening was held in a shelter near director Zarhin's childhood home.

Film critic Yair Raveh commented on this:

"Isn't it perfect, in the film's own ironic cinematic language, that its Tiberian premiere, the most festive and glamorous moment of all, took place in a shelter, underground? It's, of course, tragic, but suddenly, as I write these lines, it feels like a poetic ending—a bittersweet one—that Aviva herself would have written."

== Cast ==
- Asi Levi – Aviva Cohen
- Rotem Abuhav – Anita
- Levana Finkelstein – Violette
- Dror Keren – Moni Cohen
- Sasson Gabai – Oded Zar

== Soundtrack ==
In March 2020 Helicon Music released the film's soundtrack, which includes new remixes and tracks that were not included in the original release. The theme song "My Spring Shall Come" ("האביב שלי יגיע") was performed by Miri Mesika, and it appears in two different versions. The soundtrack features the following talents:

- Limor Oved – Vocalization
- Yankale Segal – Oud
- Nitzan Hen Razel – Violin
- Oren Fried – Percussions
- Jonathan Bar Giora – Piano and keyboards
- Shemi Zarhin – Synth qanun and voices

As the film was released in 2006 a special mix was released to the radio, in which, in addition to the original players, also feature Dudu Tassa on the guitar, Yaniv Teichman on the Oud and the Bağlama, Asher Pedi on the drums and Uri Zach on the keyboards.
