= Efron Etkin =

Israeli actor (1952–2012)

- עפרון אטקין
- Born: 29 December 1952; Hatzor, Israel
- Died: 16 January 2012 (aged 59); Hatzor, Israel
- Occupations: Actor; voice actor; theatre director; dubbing director
- Years active: 1976–2012
- Father: Zvi Etkin

Efron Etkin (Hebrew: עפרון אטקין; 29 December 1952 – 16 January 2012) was an Israeli actor and voice actor.

== Biography ==
Born in Hatzor, Etkin was born to a family of three children. His father, Zvi Etkin was a member of the Haganah and also taught the Arabic language. Etkin studied acting at the Tel Aviv University and also went to the United States to continue his acting studies at the HB Studio in New York City. He also served as an officer in the Israeli Air Force.

Etkin was a frequent performer at the Habima Theatre. There, he performed in stage adaptations of A Midsummer Night's Dream and The Taming of the Shrew. He also worked at other theatres such as the Beersheba Theatre as well as the Cameri Theatre and the Orna Porat Children's Theatre. In cinema and television, Etkin made an appearance in the 1999 film Operation Grandma directed by Dror Shaul. He also appeared in the television shows Polishuk and Life is Not Everything, which were among his final roles on television.

Etkin was perhaps best recognised as a voice actor. He was among the most leading dubbers across Israel. He was best known for performing the Hebrew voice of Piglet from the Winnie the Pooh franchise. He also dubbed Dolf in Alfred J. Kwak, Elvis Cridlington in Fireman Sam and numerous characters in Dragon Ball Z. For films, Etkin performed the Hebrew voices of the title character in Robin Hood, Bernard in The Rescuers and The Rescuers Down Under, Aaron in The Prince of Egypt and many more. In 2005, Etkin began serving as a dubbing director for Videofilm International.

== Death ==
In late 2011, Etkin was diagnosed with cancer but this did not stop him from making his final stage and voice contributions. On January 16, 2012, he succumbed to the disease and died in his hometown shortly after his 59th birthday. Etkin did not marry, nor did he have any children.
