= Davida Karol =

Davida Karol (Hebrew: דווידה קרול; June 20, 1917 – December 9, 2011) was an Israeli actress and translator.

Karol came to Israel in 1924 with her family.

Karol played in movies and TV series such as Mivtza Savta, Florentin and Johnny. Karol also translated over 20 books from Russian to Hebrew.
