= Rotem Abuhav =

Israeli actress (born 1976)

Rotem Abuhav, 2015

Rotem Abuhav or Rotem Abuhab (Hebrew: רותם אבוהב; Rotem Itach-Ashbel (רותם איטח־אשבל) before marriage) is an Israeli actress, stand-up comedian and TV host.

== Biography ==
She started her career being eight years old as a child actress in Rechov Sumsum (the Israeli version of the educational program Sesame Street), in Zehu Ze! (Hebrew: זהו זה!, lit. 'That's It!'), and doing adverticements for the Israeli Teletext service.

She is described as "one of the funniest women in Israel".

== Filmography ==
- 1998: Thunder Cats (Hatulot Hara'am), Rotem's film debut
- 1999: Mivtza Savta (Operation Grandma)
- 2003: Sima Vaknin, a Witch, fantasy film
- 2003: Bonjour Monsieur Shlomi
- 2004: Turn Left at the End of the World
- 2006: Aviva, My Love,
- 2021: The Girl from Oslo (TV series)
- 2024: Kugel (TV series)
- 2024: Cat's Luck, mystery/comedy
- 2025: Red Alert (TV series)

== Awards ==
- 2006: Ophir Award in Best Supporting Actress category in Aviva, My Love

== Personal ==
She is married to Shai Abuhav (now retired Major of the IDF, in reserve). Shai's family immigrated from Izmir, Turkey. Rotem and Shai met when she was 21 and he was 25. They have three sons. Their oldest son Omer Abuhav is a soccer player. He has been playing in various youth and professional clubs of the Israeli Premier League.
