= Jerusalem Khan Theatre =

Theatre in Jerusalem, Israel

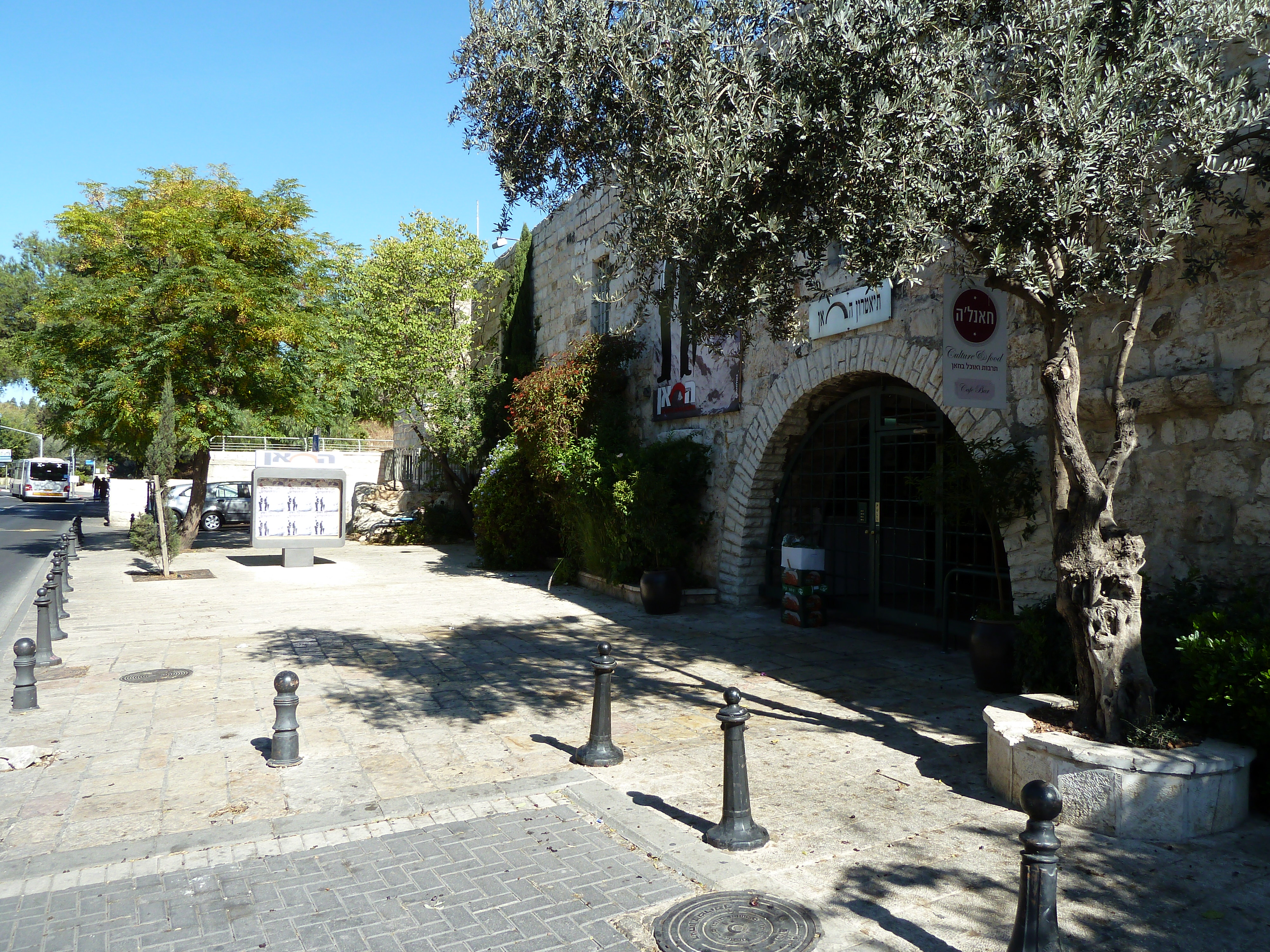
- Interactive map of Jerusalem Khan Theatre
- Location: Jerusalem, Israel
- Coordinates: 31°46′07″N 35°13′29″E

Website
- Official website

Jerusalem Khan Theatre (Hebrew: תיאטרון החאן, romanized: Teatron HaKhan, lit. 'The Caravanserai Theatre') is a repertory theatre based in Jerusalem. The theatre is located near the Jerusalem Railway Station, in an old caravanserai building.

== History ==
The khan was built on the ruins of an ancient inn from the Crusader period. It served caravan travelers who arrived in Jerusalem after nightfall when the gates of the Old City were locked. In later years, the building housed a beer-cellar and a carpentry workshop.

The Jerusalem Khan Theatre opened its doors in October 1967 at the initiative of then Mayor of Jerusalem, Teddy Kollek, who secured money from the Gestetner Family Fund to restore the crumbling building. The picturesque arches and courtyards were preserved, while 230 seats and a modern sound and light system were installed.

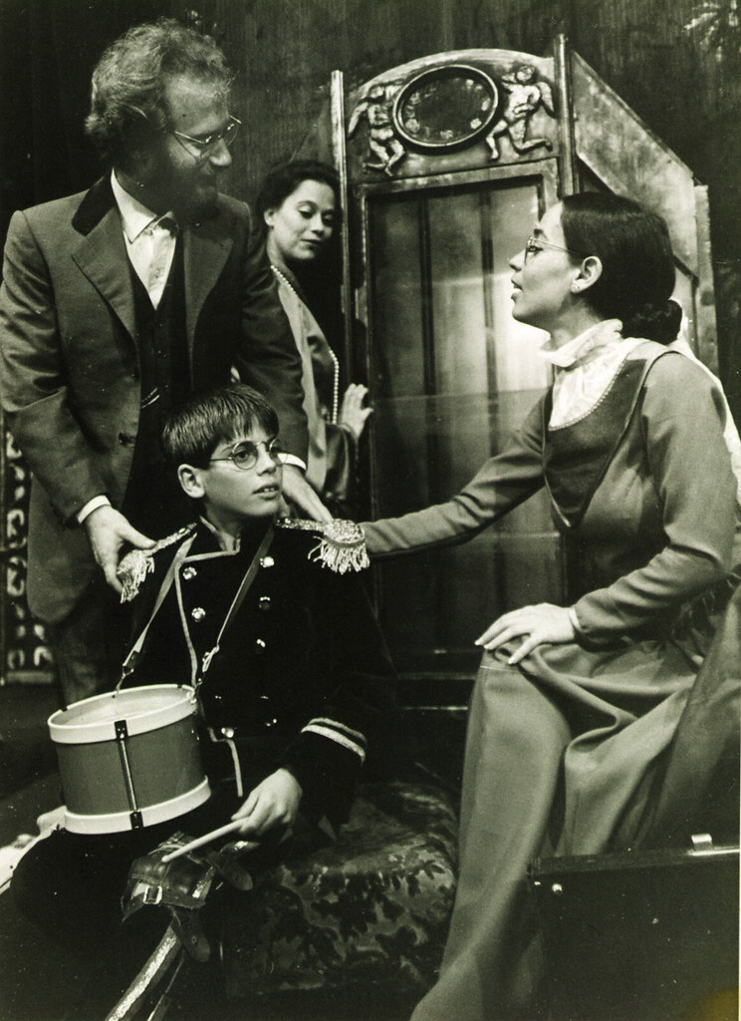
Scene from a 1986 production at the Jerusalem Khan Theatre of Little Eyolf

The artistic director of the English theatre was Jacqueline Kronberg and the artistic director of the Hebrew theatre was Phillip Diskin. A year later, the theater company disbanded and the building became a venue for local cultural events. In early 1973 a new theatre company was established. Over the years, Michael Alfreds, Ilan Ronen, Ada Ben Nahum, Yossi Izraeli, Amit Gazit, Eran Niall, Ofira Henig and Michael Gurevich have served as artistic directors. The current artistic director is the theatre actor and director Udi Ben-Moshe.

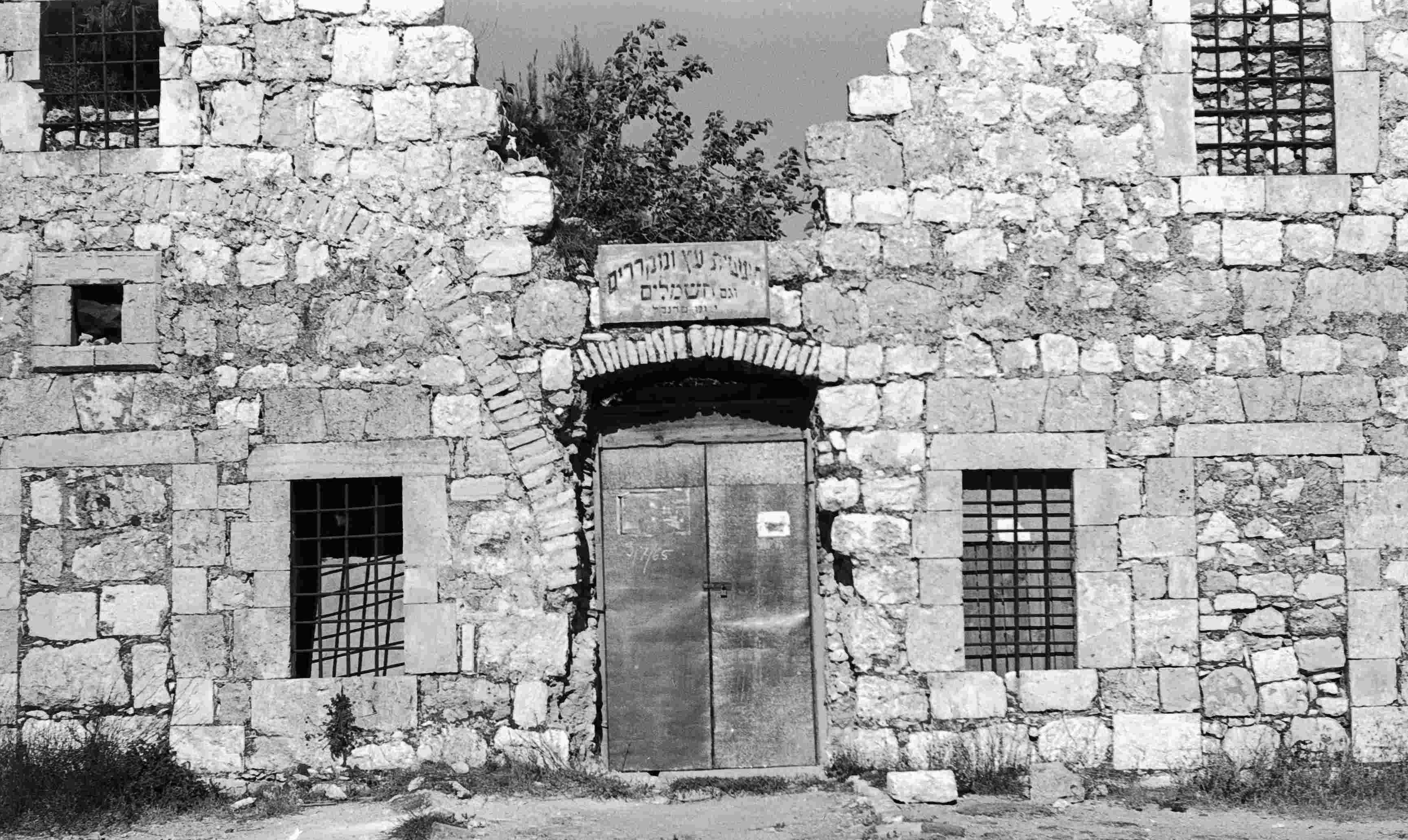
Southwestern entrance before reconstruction. The sign reads: "wood and refrigerators factory, also electric"

The theatre produces 4-5 new shows annually. The former artistic director, Michael Gurevich, wrote and directed some of the plays. Prominent productions included: "A passing shadow" (2000), "War on Home" (2002), "The Miser" (2003), "Happiness" (2004), "Life Is a Dream (2005). Over all, the theater has about 200 performances a year in house and about 70 in other halls, mainly in the Mann Auditorium in the Jerusalem Theater complex.

The Khan Theatre is a non-profit organization. The theatre's executive committee consists of public figures and representatives of organizations that support it financially - the Jerusalem Municipality, the Jerusalem Foundation and the Ministry of Culture and Sport.

In 1998-2001 the Khan Theater hosted the International Festival of Chamber Music.

The Khan compound includes two halls - the main hall with 238 seats, where most of the major productions of theater are shown, and a second hall with 70 seats used for concerts and meetings.
