= Longing (2017 film) =

2017 film

- Film poster
- Directed by: Savi Gabizon
- Written by: Savi Gabizon
- Starring: Shai Avivi; Asi Levi; Neta Riskin
- Cinematography: Asaf Sudry
- Edited by: Tali Halter-Shenkar
- Music by: Yoram Hazan
- Release date: 18 July 2017
- Running time: 100 minutes
- Country: Israel
- Language: Hebrew

Longing (Hebrew: געגוע) is a 2017 Israeli comedy-drama film directed by Savi Gabizon. It was screened in the Contemporary World Cinema section at the 2017 Toronto International Film Festival. It was nominated for the Ophir Award for Best Film. The film takes place primarily in Acre, Israel.

== Plot ==
Ariel (Shai Avivi) meets with his ex-partner Ronit (Asi Levy) at a restaurant about twenty years after they broke up. She tells him that when they separated, she was pregnant with his child and that their son, Adam (Adam Gabay), died in a car accident two weeks earlier. Ariel, a successful industrialist living in Tel Aviv, travels to Acre, where Ronit and Adam lived. He spends several days there and meets various people from Adam’s life, gradually learning details about his son’s life.

Initially, Ariel meets Miki (Uri Leizerovitch), a friend of Adam’s, who tells him that he and Adam had bought a kilogram of hashish to make a living from selling it, but the hashish was lost in the car accident that killed Adam. Miki also tells Ariel where Adam’s school was, and Ariel goes there and meets the principal, Amnon (Shmuel Ben Ari), who informs him that Adam was expelled after writing an obscene poem about the French teacher on the wall in front of the school. In the schoolyard, Lilia (Ella Armoni), Adam’s 15-year-old girlfriend, approaches Ariel and tells him that Adam had been living with her because of a conflict with his stepfather. However, Adam’s true love was the French teacher, Yael (Neta Riskin). At the end of the school day, Ariel waits by the school gate until he sees Yael leaving. He approaches her, and they begin to talk. Yael tells him that Adam was in love with her, but she refrained from having a romantic relationship with him because he was her student.

Ariel visits Adam’s grave, and at the cemetery, he befriends Gideon (Yoram Toledano), the father of Abigail, who suffered from depression and committed suicide at the age of 18. Gideon proposes an idea inspired by a Chinese custom: to marry Adam and Abigail. Ariel finds the idea appealing and works to make it happen.

== Cast ==
- Shai Avivi
- Asi Levi
- Neta Riskin
- Ori Laizerouvich
- Yoram Tolledano
- Shimon Mimran

== Awards ==
At the 2017 Jerusalem Film Festival, Longing won the award for best script, as well as the Audience Favorite Award. At the 2017 Ophir Awards, Longing had 13 nominations and won for Best Screenplay.
