= Ami Smolartchik =

Israeli actor

- עמי סמולרצ'יק
- Born: 15 January 1970 (age 56); Haifa, Israel
- Occupations: Actor; comedian
- Years active: 1995–present
- Spouse: Dorit Lev-Ari (m. 1995; div. 2001)
- Children: 3

Ami Smolartchik (Hebrew: עמי סמולרצ'יק; born 15 January 1970) is an Israeli comedian and actor. In 2017 he won the Ophir award in the supporting actor category. He has played in several moves, TV series as well as in the theatre.

== Biography ==
Smolartchik was born in Haifa in 1970. His father is a Yiddish speaking Holocaust survivor whose testimony is recorded in Steven Spielberg's archives.

Smolartchick graduated from the Nisan Nativ acting studio.

=== Career ===
Smolartchick has acted in TV series, movies as well as plays.

In 1995, he acted in the TV series "Hello Penina" in the role of a clerk.

In 1997, he guest-starred in the comedy series "Itche," which aired on Channel 2, playing the role of Eli Pacino.

His major breakthrough role was in the drama series "Florentin," which aired from 1997 to 2001 on Channel 2, where he played Hanan.

In 1998, he made a very small guest appearance in the television series "20 Plus," which aired on Educational Television, portraying a man on the street trying to flirt with Miki.

In 2002, he guest-starred in the third season of the youth drama series "The Good Guys" on Children's Channel, playing Amir Tzemach "Charma."

In 2004, he participated in the series "Love Hurts."

In 2005, he played the character Trelah in the children's series "Trelah's Igloo."

In 2007, he acted in the TV series "Without Socks."

In 2008, he participated in the humor show "Week's End," where he portrayed the character of politician Tzipi Livni. He also appeared in the educational comedy "Without Socks." That year, he also acted in the series "Papadisi" as Manolis and in "That's It."

In 2010, he participated in several series, including "15 Minutes" and "Knitters."
