= Kissufim =

Kibbutz in southern Israel

Kissufim: כִּסּוּפִים (Hebrew); كيسوفيم (Arabic)
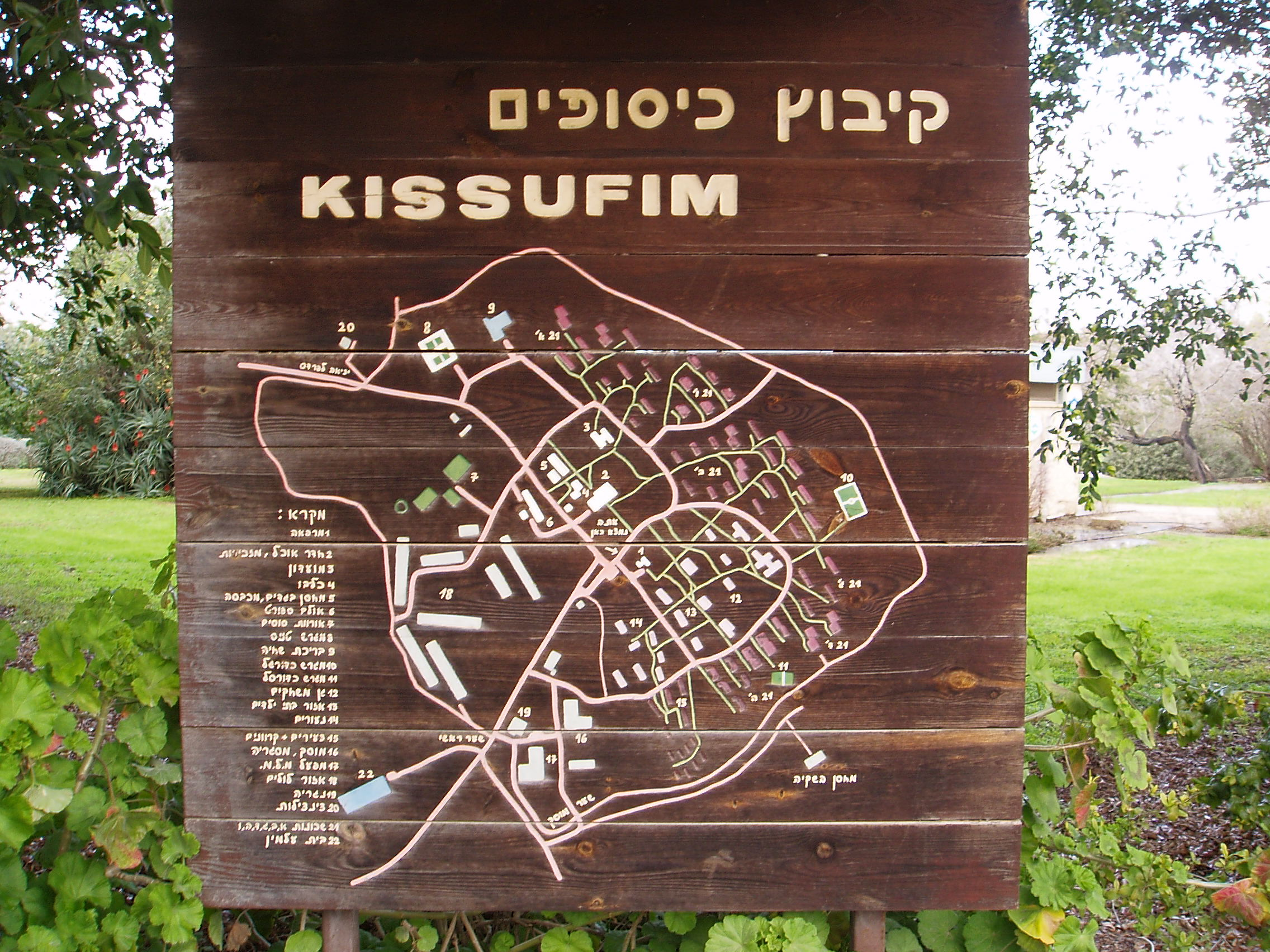
- Map of Kissufim on a sign in the kibbutz.
- Etymology: Yearning
- Location within Northwest Negev region of Israel Location within Israel
- Coordinates: 31°22′27″N 34°23′58″E
- Country: Israel
- District: Southern
- Subdistrict: Beersheba
- Council: Eshkol
- Affiliation: Kibbutz Movement
- Founded: 1951
- Founder: American and South American Zionist youth movement members
- Population (2024): 356
- Website: www.kissufim.org.il

Kissufim (Hebrew: כִּסּוּפִים, lit. 'Yearning') is a kibbutz in the northwestern Negev desert in Israel. Located adjacent to the Gaza Strip at an altitude of 92 m (302 ft) above sea level, it falls under the jurisdiction of Eshkol Regional Council. In 2024 it had a population of 356.

== History ==
The village was established in 1951 by Zionist youth movement members from the United States and South America. One of the founders of the kibbutz was Ami Saull, who was born in Manhattan 1932 (nephew of Israel Galili and father of filmmaker Dror Shaul). Kissufim is part of the Shalom bloc of Israeli settlement meant to secure Israel's southern border with the Gaza Strip from the numerous Palestinian Fedayeen infiltrations. The government financed reinforced concrete rooms for each home which serve as bomb shelters.

In 1999, Dror Shaul, who was born and raised on Kissufim, filmed a satirical comedy, Operation Grandma, based on life in the kibbutz. In 2023, Keren Nechmad released her film Kissufim, shot on location, and which won awards at several film festivals.

Through the Kissufim gate, humanitarian aid is transferred to the Gaza Strip by Israel and other entities.

Hamas has attacked Kissufim with rocket attacks several times in the 2010s and 2020s. In 2023 Hamas perpetrated the Kissufim massacre.

=== 2023 Hamas massacre ===
On 7 October 2023, Hamas launched an attack on Kissufim during a large-scale Hamas-led attack on southern Israel. Hamas militants perpetrated a massacre in Kissufim during the attack, murdering nine residents (including Shlomo Mansour, whose body was taken hostage) and six foreign workers, and abducting several other residents. Kissufim has since been depopulated, with the residents living in temporary housing in Omer.

By 2025, 25 people had already returned to live on the kibbutz and a kindergarten had opened. Work continued on clearing ruined homes, and preparations for rebuilding had begun. Over the coming two to three years, the kibbutz intends to build 25 homes, financed through NIS 14 million (US$4.3 million) from the Tkuma Directorate and NIS 6 million (US$1.86 million) from its own resources.

== Economy ==
The kibbutz economy relies on dairy farming, poultry farming, citrus groves and an avocado orchard which constitutes one of the kibbutz's primary sources of income. Kissufim had a factory that produced plastic frames for eyeglasses. The Kissufim dairy has 380 cows with an average milk production of 12,800 liters.

== Archaeology ==
Tell Jemmeh is a major archaeological site located about 5 kilometers east-northeast of Kissufim, on the southern bank of HaBesor Stream. In June 1977, a tractor-driver preparing a new field discovered mosaics believed to be part of the floor of a mid-sixth century Byzantine church. According to archaeologists it was built on the plan of an early Christian Basilica during the reign of Constantine in 313 C.E.

Kibbutz Kissufim houses an archaeology museum showcasing artifacts discovered in the area.

In 1961, a stone fragment bearing a Hebrew inscription was discovered near Kissufim. The inscription mentions the priestly course of Petaḥia. It is believed to date back to the 5th or 6th century CE.

== Kissufim crossing ==
The nearby crossing into the Gaza Strip, named for the kibbutz, was the main route for traffic into the Gush Katif Israeli settlement bloc. It was permanently closed to inbound Israeli civilian traffic on 15 August 2005 as part of the disengagement plan. The last Israeli soldier left the Gaza Strip and closed the gate at dawn of 12 September 2005, completing the Israeli withdrawal from the Gaza Strip.

Israel reopened the crossing on 12 November 2024 in response to US demands to open another crossing into the Gaza Strip. The demands were intended to increase the flow of humanitarian aid into Gaza.

== Notable people ==
- Avihu Medina, composer, arranger, songwriter and singer
- Dror Shaul, filmmaker

== See also ==
- Kissufim massacre
- Simsim
