= Three Mothers (2006 film) =

2006 Israeli drama film by Dina Zvi-Riklis

- Directed by: Dina Zvi-Riklis
- Screenplay by: Alma Ganihar; Dina Zvi-Riklis
- Starring: Gila Almagor; Miri Mesika; Rivka Raz; Reymond Amsalem; Tali Sharon; Tracy Abramovich; Dana Zilberstein
- Cinematography: Shai Goldman
- Edited by: Tova Ascher
- Production company: Golan-Globus
- Release date: 13 July 2006
- Running time: 106 minutes

Three Mothers (Hebrew: שלוש אמהות, Shalosh Imahot) is a 2006 Israeli drama film, directed by Dina Zvi-Riklis.

== Plot synopsis ==
The film follows three sisters who were born as triplets: Rose, Flora and Yasmeen. The sisters grow up in a prosperous family in Egypt, and are visited by King Farouk. The film moves between the current-day relationship of the sisters, now in their sixties, and their story from when they were young, as they relate it to Ruha, Rose's daughter.

The girls' mother died young, when the family lived in Alexandria. The widowed father decides to move to Tel Aviv, in Israel, where he opens a large shop. Rose, who is fiercely independent, begins a relationship with a young man her father does not approve of. When she becomes pregnant, marriage becomes a priority for all the sisters. On the eve of their triple wedding, the father dies.

The film is woven throughout with the singing of younger Rose, played by singer Miri Mesika. We learn of the complex relations among the sisters through their encounters with Ruha, who films them telling their stories. As she peels off the sisters' outer layers of secrets and past wrongs, what she hears causes her emotional distress, and she is worried this might affect her attempts to become pregnant. As it turns out, the acts and betrayals carried out by the sisters are beyond her imagination.

== Awards ==
Year	Award	Category	Nominee(s)	Result
2006	Awards of the Israeli Film Academy	Best Cinematography	Shai Goldman	Won
2006	Awards of the Israeli Film Academy	Best Costume Design	Rona Doron	Won
2006	Awards of the Israeli Film Academy	Best Film	Shmulik Neufeld; Eran Riklis; Ifat Perstalink	Nominated
2006	Awards of the Israeli Film Academy	Best Director	Dina Zvi-Riklis	Nominated
2006	Awards of the Israeli Film Academy	Best Editing	Tova Ascher	Nominated
2006	Awards of the Israeli Film Academy	Best Art Direction	Eitan Levi	Nominated
2006	Awards of the Israeli Film Academy	Best Music	Ori Zakh; Shmulik Neufeld	Nominated
2006	Awards of the Israeli Film Academy	Best Sound	Israel David; Gil Toren; Asher Milo	Nominated
2006	Jerusalem Film Festival	Best Cinematography	Shai Goldman	Won
2006	Jerusalem Film Festival	Best Israeli Feature	Dina Zvi-Riklis	Nominated
2006	Jerusalem Film Festival	Special Prize	Gila Almagor	Won
2007	Jersey Shore Film Festival	Best Feature Film	Dina Zvi-Riklis	Won
2008	Vesoul Asian Film Festival	Golden Wheel	Dina Zvi-Riklis	Nominated

== Cast ==
Actor	Character
Gila Almagor	Older Rose
Miri Mesika	Younger Rose
Tracy Abramowitz	Older Yasmeen
Dana Zilberstein	Younger Yasmeen
Rivka Raz	Older Flora
Reymond Amsalem	Younger Flora
Tali Sharon	Ruha
Beni Avni	Yoni
Shmil Ben Ari	Older Menashe
Amos Tamam	Younger Menashe
Yehezkel Lazarov	Felix
Yoram Toledano	Gavriel
Yoram Hatav	Eliyahu Hakim
Natalie Atia	Rachel Hakim

== Production ==
According to Zvi-Riklis, the genesis of the film was from a short story she wrote about memory while taking part in a writing workshop. She later developed it into a screenplay, with the help of Alma Ganihar. She said in an interview that while the story is not autobiographical, it does borrow from her life, such as the common story of families that were well-off in their native countries of Iraq or Egypt, arrived in Israel as second-class citizens, had their names changed, and their cultures erased. One of the main challenges the production faced was the casting: It was necessary to find three generations of related women, and Israel has a small cinematic community.

== Reception ==
In his Haaretz review, Uri Klein wrote that Three Mothers captivated him; he says that the plot is so thick, that the director is forced sometimes to use clichéd formulas to move it forward, but that the film's virtues far outweigh its weaknesses, especially in the extraordinary portrait of womanhood it paints. Both he and Avner Shavit, writing in Ahbar Ha'Ir, agreed that earlier attempts in Israeli cinema to present family sagas and melodramas failed miserably, and Shavit wrote that Zvi-Riklis managed to create a "fascinating puzzle", impressive at "an international level". He found the plot lacking in authentic emotion, but also felt the positives overcome the negatives.
