= Yoav Sarig =

Israeli scientist and inventor (1937–2013)

Yoav Sarig (Hebrew: יואב שריג; July 27, 1937 – 2013) was an Israeli scientist, inventor and agricultural engineer. He was an expert in the field of mechanical harvesting of fruit, and is the holder of several patents for mechanical apparatus for the harvesting and processing of jojoba beans, pecan nuts and pomegranates.

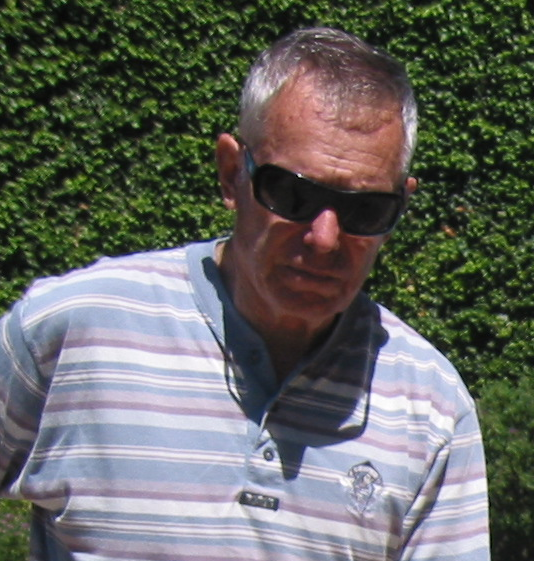
Dr. Yoav Sarig

== Biography ==
=== Early years and academic education ===
Sarig was born in Tel-Aviv. He received his Bachelor of Science degree from the Technion in 1962 and his master's degree from the Technion in 1972. Sarig was awarded his doctorate from Michigan State University in 1976. The title of his doctoral thesis was Deformation analysis of foam-encapsulated apples under impact loading.

=== Research interests ===
Working for Israel's Volcani Centre, where he headed the Institute for Agricultural Engineering from 1985 to 1988, Sarig developed apparatus including a mechanical pollinator for Date Palms, an apparatus for separating pomegranate seeds, a mechanical cracker for Macadamia nuts and a machine for harvesting agricultural produce from the ground suitable for Pecan nuts and similar produce. In later years, his interest turned to non-invasive methods for evaluation of agricultural produce - to assess a product's readiness for harvest or its ripeness without harming the fruit. He pioneered the use of Nuclear Magnetic Resonance (NMR) to evaluate the maturity of Avocado fruits, and the use of an "artificial nose" utilizing the olfactory response of fresh produce as a consumer-oriented and non-destructive quality evaluation method. He also researched the use of mechanization and automation as an alternative to manual labor in agriculture, and published several articles on the topic, which concluded that as long as cheap immigrant labor (some of it illegal) was available, there is little incentive for farmers to invest in labor-saving agricultural automation.

=== China ===
When China in 1992 formally established diplomatic relations with Israel and an Israeli embassy was opened in Beijing, Sarig was appointed Science and Agriculture Counsellor, a role he held for 4 years, from 1993 to 1997. There, Sarig proposed and oversaw the establishment of three major demonstration farms in China, which showcase Israeli agricultural technology, and several training centers which are supported by both the Chinese and Israeli ministries of agriculture. Sarig also realized the significance of conducting a variety of management courses in China, and instituted a program to deliver courses in business, marketing and business management. In recognition of his contributions, he was awarded the title "Honorary Professor" by China Agricultural University.

== Honors ==
In 2006, Sarig was awarded the Namir Prize for his work in developing the apparatus for the separation of pomegranate seeds, and the same apparatus also won the American Society of Agricultural and Biological Engineers (ASABE)'s AE50 Award in 2007.

In recognition of his professional achievements, Sarig was named an ASABE Fellow in 2010.

== Patents ==
Sarig was awarded several US patents. These included;

- U.S. patent 4,211,062 Machine for harvesting agricultural produce
- U.S. patent 4,530,278 Apparatus for separating pomegranate seeds
- U.S. patent 4,580,397 Apparatus for harvesting of jojoba beans
