= Reymond Amsalem =

Israeli actress (born 1978)

- ריימונד אמסלם
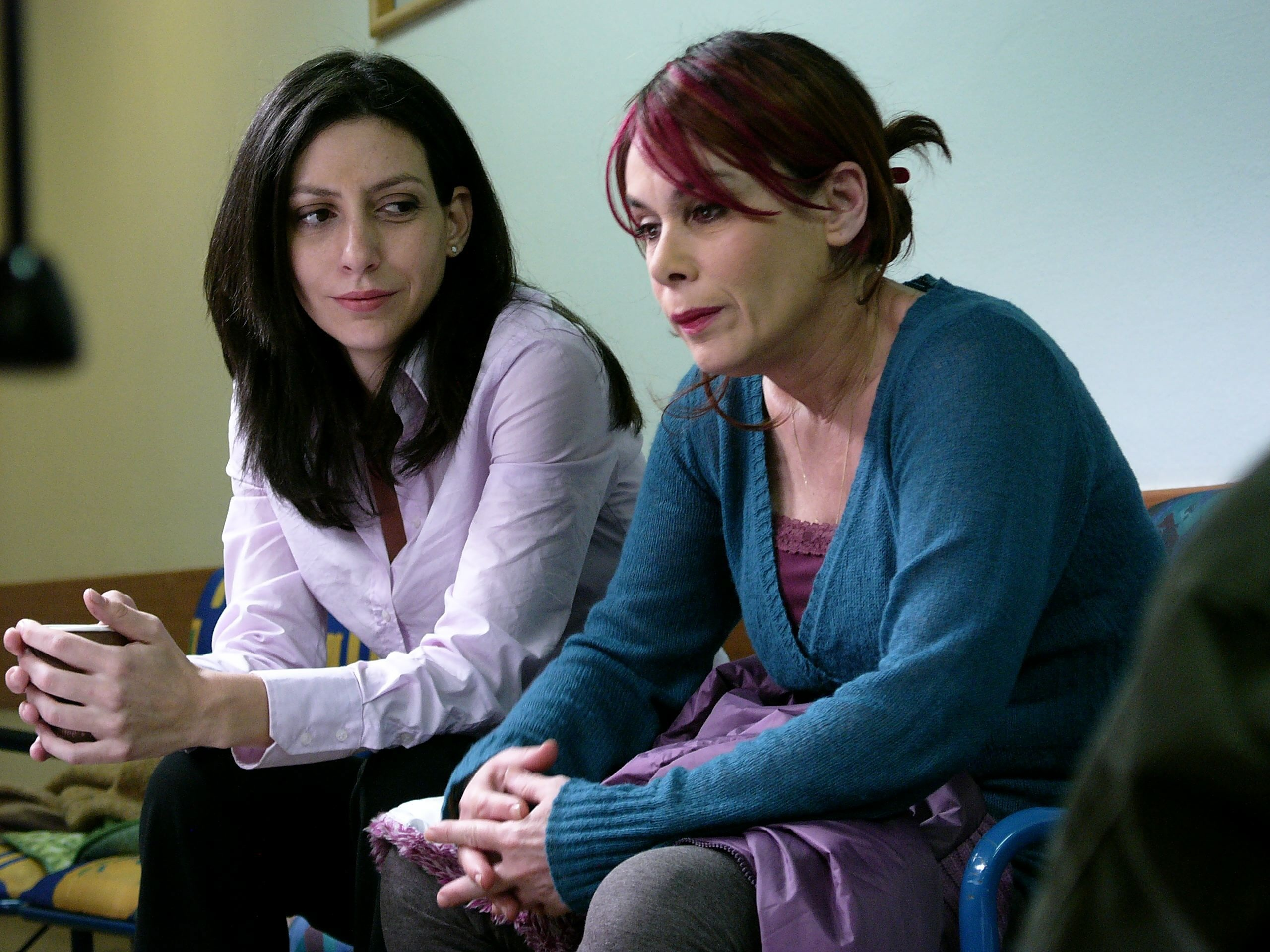
- Reymond Amsalem (left) and Orly Silbersatz Banai in Bein HaShmashot (2010)
- Born: 19 July 1978 (age 47); Jerusalem, Israel
- Occupation: Actress
- Years active: 1988-present

Reymond Amsalem (Hebrew: ריימונד אמסלם; born 19 July 1978) is an Israeli actress. She has appeared in more than 20 films since 2003 and was born in Jerusalem to a family of Moroccan Jews.

== Selected filmography ==
Film
Year	Title	Role	Notes
2023	Seven Blessings	Marie	Lead role; Co-writer
2023	The Future	Dr. Nurit Bloch	
2014	Apples from the Desert	Victoria Abarbanel	
2012	The Attack	Siham Jaafari	
2010	The Human Resources Manager		
2009	Lebanon	Lebanese Mother	
2009	Kirot		
2007	Rendition	Layla Fawal	
2006	Three Mothers	Younger Flora	

Television
Year	Title	Role	Notes
2024	Testament: The Story of Moses	Miriam	Netflix Documentary Series
2016	Hostages	Orna	Season 2
2015	Homeland	Üter's Wife	
