= The Band's Visit =

- Theatrical release poster
- Hebrew: ביקור התזמורת
- Directed by: Eran Kolirin
- Written by: Eran Kolirin
- Produced by: Ehud Bleiberg; Koby Gal-Raday; Guy Jacoel; Eylon Ratzkovsky; Yossi Uzrad
- Starring: Saleh Bakri; Ronit Elkabetz; Sasson Gabai; Uri Gavriel
- Cinematography: Shai Goldman
- Edited by: Arik Leibovitch
- Music by: Habib Shehadeh Hanna
- Distributed by: Sophie Dulac Distribution (France); Sony Pictures Classics (United States)
- Release dates: 19 May 2007 (Cannes); 13 September 2007
- Running time: 87 minutes
- Countries: Israel; France; United States
- Languages: Arabic; English; Hebrew
- Box office: $14.6 million

The Band's Visit (Hebrew: ביקור התזמורת, romanized: Bikur Ha-Tizmoret) is a 2007 comedy-drama film written and directed by Eran Kolirin, and starring Saleh Bakri, Ronit Elkabetz, Sasson Gabai and Uri Gavriel. It is an international co-production between Israel, France and the United States.

The film received critical and audience acclaim. It won eight Ophir Prizes awarded by the Israeli Film Academy. It was Israel's original Foreign Language Film submission for the 80th Academy Awards, but was rejected by the Academy of Motion Picture Arts and Sciences because it contained over 50% English dialogue. Thus, Israel sent Beaufort instead, which was eventually included in the five final nominees.

== Synopsis ==
The eight men of the Alexandria Ceremonial Police Orchestra arrive in Israel from Egypt. They have been booked by an Arab cultural center in Petah Tikva, but through a miscommunication (Arabic has no "p" sound, and regularly replaces it with "b"), the band takes a bus to Beit Hatikva, a fictional town in the middle of the Negev Desert.

The Egyptians encounter a few Israeli townspeople, who respond with curiosity about the band, are variously friendly and wary, and provide them with shelter, food, music, and companionship during their visit. No transportation leaves the town that day, and there are no hotels for them to stay in.

The band members dine at a small restaurant where the owner, Dina (Ronit Elkabetz), invites them to stay the night at her apartment, at her friends' apartment, and in the restaurant. No one quite falls in love, but a sense of unspoken longing and loneliness is expressed.

== Cast ==
=== As Israelis ===
- Ronit Elkabetz as Dina
- Uri Gavriel as Avrum
- Rubi Moskovitz as Itzik
- Hilla Sarjon as Iris
- Rinat Matatov as Yula
- Ahuva Keren as Lea
- Shlomi Avraham as Papi
- Tomer Yosef as Ars

=== As Egyptians ===
- Sasson Gabai as Lieutenant-colonel Tawfiq Zacharya
- Imad Jabarin as Major-general Camal Abdel Azim
- Saleh Bakri as Khaled
- Khalifa Natour as Simon
- Tarak Kopty as Iman
- François Khell as Makram
- Hisham Khoury as Fauzi

== Release ==
=== Critical reception ===
The Band's Visit received critical acclaim. Rotten Tomatoes reported that 98% of critics gave the film positive reviews, based on 116 reviews with an average of 7.9/10. The site's consensus states: "The Band's Visit is both a clever, subtle, slice-of-life comedy, and poignant cross-cultural exploration." It also received a Golden Tomato for Best Foreign Film of 2008. On Metacritic, it has an 80 out of 100 rating, based on 29 critics, indicating "generally favorable reviews".

Ray Bennett of The Hollywood Reporter named the film the second best of 2007, V.A. Musetto of the New York Post named it the 8th best film of 2007, and both Ella Taylor of LA Weekly and Associated Press film critic David Germain named it the 9th best film of 2007.

Roger Ebert of the Chicago Sun-Times selected it as one of the 20 best films of 2008. According to Ebert, "The Band’s Visit has not provided any of the narrative payoffs we might have expected, but has provided something more valuable: An interlude involving two 'enemies,' Arabs and Israelis, that shows them both as only ordinary people with ordinary hopes, lives, and disappointments. It has also shown us two souls with rare beauty."

Gabai's characterization and playing of Tawfiq Zacharya was hailed by critics, who described him as "an actor of real skill, and an artist capable of the deepest understanding of the human condition." During the Israeli Film Academy Awards in September 2007, Bakri, "the band's handsome young trumpet player" thanked his parents and said, "I want to thank my father, who taught me to love mankind, and my mother, who taught me to bear the burden of life in this country and stand strong," he said.

For her role, critics described Elkabetz as "wonderful ... a kind-hearted lonely heart refusing to wilt in her desert town". During the Israeli Film Academy Awards Ceremony in September 2007, Elkabetz brought a message of reconciliation and hope, and after taking a bow before the film's director, she said to him, "You reminded us of a thing or two that we have already managed to forget. You showed us what would happen if we would stand before each other, Jews and Arabs and look each other in the eye."

The skating rink scene is considered a highlight of the film: "The band's handsome young trumpet player, Khaled, who idolizes jazz icon Chet Baker, encounters the resident Papi (Shlomi Avraham, שלומי אברהם), an Israeli nebbish and accompanies him on a blind date at a roller-skating rink. When the local boy proves too awkward to make any advances to his date, the more experienced Egyptian guides him along, wordlessly, but with eloquent gestures."

=== Awards and nominations ===
Wins

- Best Film – Ophir Award
- Best Director – Ophir Award
- Best Actor – Ophir Award
- Best Actress – Ophir Award
- Best Supporting Actor – Ophir Award
- Best Music – Ophir Award
- Best Screenplay – Ophir Award
- Best Costumes – Ophir Award
- Un Certain Regard – Jury Coup de Coeur – Cannes Film Festival 2007
- UNESCO Award – Outstanding Contribution to the Promotion and Preservation of Cultural Diversity Through Film at the 2007 Asia Pacific Screen Awards.
- Special Mention – Flanders International Film Festival
- Scythian Deer – Molodist International Film Festival
- Feature Film Award – Montreal World Film Festival
- Audience Award – Sarajevo Film Festival
- Audience Award – Warsaw International Film Festival
- Grand Prix – Warsaw International Film Festival
- Golden Eye – Zurich Film Festival
- New Talent Award – Zurich Film Festival
- Best Actor – European Film Awards
- Best Un-released Film (in Australia) – Australian Film Critics Association Film Awards
- Grand Prize – Lino Brocka Award – Cinemanila International Film Festival

Nominations

- Best Art Direction – Award of the Israeli Film Academy
- Best Cinematography – Award of the Israeli Film Academy
- Best Editing – Award of the Israeli Film Academy
- Best Sound – Award of the Israeli Film Academy
- Best Supporting Actress – Award of the Israeli Film Academy
- Best Screenplay – European Film Awards
- Best Performance by an Actor (Sasson Gabai) – Asia Pacific Screen Awards
- Grand Prix – Flanders International Film Festival

==== Language disqualification ====
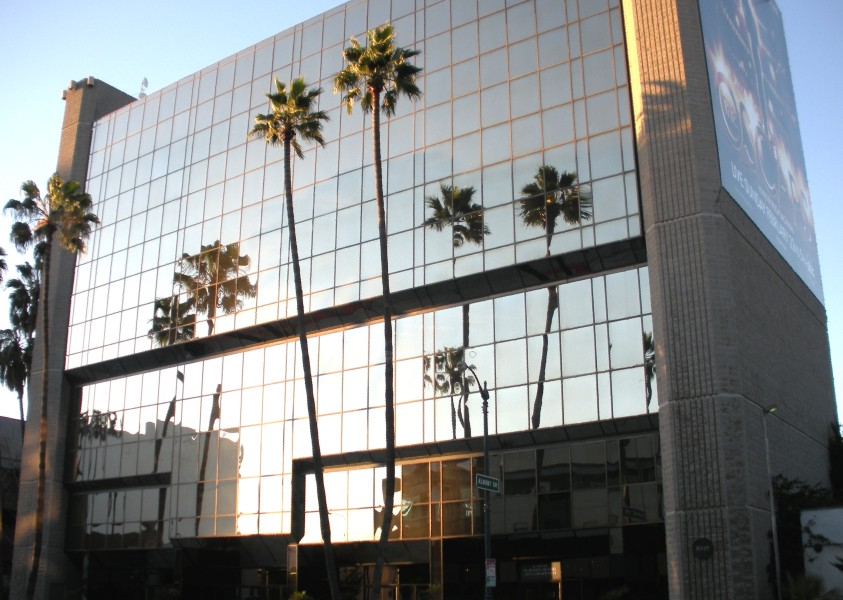
Academy of Motion Picture Arts and Sciences headquarters building

Under the rules of the Academy of Motion Picture Arts and Sciences, more than half the dialogue in a foreign film entry must be in the originating country's own language to qualify for the Academy Award for Best Foreign Language Film. However, The Band's Visit, whose Egyptian and Israeli characters communicate mainly in broken English, didn't meet the requirement and was disqualified by the Oscar committee. Even so, Sony Pictures, the film's distributor, entered it in the general Oscar categories of best picture, director, screenplay, actor and actress – none of which came through for the film.

"Nobody in Israel thought about the language problem," said Kolirin, who spent four years making the film. When he heard about the adverse American decision, "I was pissed off for a few days, but I've gotten over it," he said during a visit to Los Angeles.

== Stage adaptation ==
The film has been adapted into a stage musical of the same name. The musical's book is written by Itamar Moses with music and lyrics by David Yazbek. It opened at the Off-Broadway Linda Gross Theater, produced by the Atlantic Theatre Company, on 11 November 2016, closing on 8 January 2017. Directed by David Cromer, with choreography by Patrick McCollum, the cast stars Tony Shalhoub, John Cariani and Katrina Lenk. Later during the Broadway run as well of the United States National Tour, Sasson Gabai would reprise his role as Tewfiq in the stage production.

The musical won the 2017 Drama Critics' Circle Awards for Best Musical, the 2017 Lucille Lortel Award for Outstanding New Musical, and the Outer Critics Circle Award for Outstanding New Off-Broadway Musical. The production transferred to Broadway at the Ethel Barrymore Theatre, with previews beginning on 7 October 2017 and full opening on 9 November. The musical was the biggest winner at the 72nd Annual Tony Awards, which were presented 10 June at Radio City Music Hall, winning ten awards, including Best Musical. It also won the Grammy Award for Best Musical Theater Album at the 2019 Grammy Awards. Gabai reprised his role as Tawfiq for the Broadway production that began on 26 June 2018.

== See also ==
- Israeli film
- Culture of Israel
