= I Don't Give a Damn =

- Directed by: Shmuel Imberman
- Written by: Dahn Ben Amotz
- Starring: Ika Zohar
- Release date: July 1987
- Running time: 102 minutes
- Country: Israel
- Language: Hebrew

I Don't Give a Damn (Hebrew: לא שם זין, translit. Lo Sam Zayin) is a 1987 Israeli drama film directed by Shmuel Imberman, and starring Ika Zohar, Anat Waxman, and Shmuel Vilozni. It is based on a novel by Dahn Ben Amotz, and was adapted for the screen by Hanan Peled.

The film, about a war veteran who needs to use a wheelchair after being shot in the stomach, is described by author Gönül Dönmez-Colin as an "excellent example of Israeli war cinema where young men are instructed to commit their body to injury and death and in fact abandon it in the name of the belief in the, as it were, sacred idea of the nation-state".

== Cast ==
- Ika Zohar as Raffi
- Anat Waxman as Nira
- Shmuel Vilozni as Eli
- Shlomo Tarshish as Amnon
- Liora Grossman as Maya
- Dror Amit
- Miri Ben Barouch
- Udi Ben-Moshe
- Dudu Ben-Zeev
- Yosef El-Dor
- Yehudit Geva
- Israel Gruber
- Miki Kazula
- Gita Lavi
- Moshe Matalon

== Reception ==
Walter Goodman of The New York Times described I Don't Give a Damn as a "soapy Israeli movie composed of the residue of better movies past", and wrote that the director "spreads the schmaltz like a cholesterol salesman. The actors do not have a chance. When all those people start telling Rafi that he is closing himself off from possible aid and solace, it's like being at a convention of therapists. The scenes of him crashing around in his wheelchair will remind you of Coming Home, but then, everything here will remind you of something you'd rather be seeing or would rather not have to see again."

The film was awarded Best Film Editing by the Israel Film Center for 1986–7. It was submitted by Israel for the Academy Award for Best Foreign Language Film at the 60th Academy Awards, but was not selected.

== See also ==
- Frankly, my dear, I don't give a damn
- List of submissions to the 60th Academy Awards for Best Foreign Language Film
- List of Israeli submissions for the Academy Award for Best Foreign Language Film
