= Dror Shaul =

Israeli filmmaker, commercial director and film writer-director

- דרור שאול
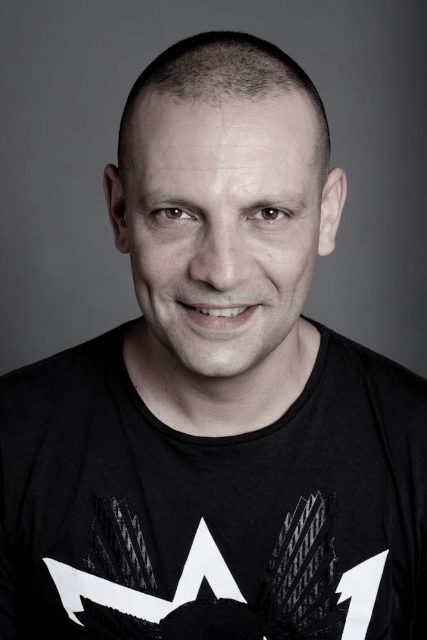
- Born: June 28, 1975 (age 49); Kissufim, Israel

Dror Shaul (Hebrew: דרור שאול; born June 28, 1975) is an Israeli filmmaker, commercial director and film writer-director, residing in Tel Aviv, Israel.

== Biography ==
Shaul was born and raised in the Kibbutz Kissufim where he lived until the age of 22.

Shaul was born to Tzipora Yefet Shaul and Ami Shaul (Saull) in Kibbutz Kissufim in the northwestern Negev. Dror is the younger brother of Ran and Tal Shaul. His grandfather, Sydney Saul, born in Poland (Yanova Belarus today), is a descendant of the Vilna Gaon family, whose parents were massacred in a pogrom in 1904, and he fled to the United States to his aunt Lena Gordon in Philadelphia. His father, Ami Shaul (Saull), was born and raised in Manhattan. He was a gifted musician who was accepted to the Academy of Music but immigrated to Israel at the age of 17. After immigrating, he came to his uncle Galili in Kibbutz Nanan, where he met a group of Americans who were preparing to establish Kibbutz Kissufim in 1951. In Kissufim, Ami met Tzipora Yefet, who was of Yemenite descent and grew up in the Hatikva neighborhood. Dror's two parents were interested in archeology and music, played various instruments and served in key social, financial and security roles in the Kibbutz. David Ben-Gurion, Moshe Sharet, Moshe Dayan and others visited Ami in the Kibbutz often.

In 1999, Dror wrote and directed his first short film Operation Grandma (Original title: "Mivtsa Savta"), which won the Israeli Academy Award, was a final nominee for the Banff Rockie Award in 2000 in Canada and is considered as one of Israel's best cult films.

His first feature film Sima Vaknin (A Witch), was released in July 2003. In the same year, Shaul participated in the Sundance Directors and Screenwriters Labs with Sweet Mud which was released in September 2006 and won 4 Israeli Academy Awards including Best Film. Sweet Mud premiered in the Toronto IFF and participated in Pusan IFF. The film won:

- The Sundance IFF Grand Jury Award in the World Cinema Competition 2007
- The Crystal Bear in Berlin IFF 2007
- The Audience Award in Miami IFF 2007
- The Bermuda IFF 2007
- The Serbia IFF 2007
- The Croatia IFF 2007
- The Prix Jeune Public and Prix Nova in Montpellier IFF 2007.

His last film Atomic Falafel, is an Israeli, German and New Zealand co-production with Iranian participants. It was released at the Montreal World Film Festival on September 1, 2015, and more widely in Israel on September 10, 2015.

Shaul has directed hundreds of commercials and won many local and international awards such as the European Effie for Huawei Christmas 2016, which was also selected as one of the best 10 Christmas commercials on Ads Of Brands 2016.
