= Shemi Zarhin =

Israeli film director and screenwriter

- שמי זרחין
- Born: 9 August 1961 (age 64); Tiberias, Israel
- Education: Tel Aviv University
- Occupations: Director; Writer
- Spouse: Einat Glaser-Zarhin

Shimon "Shemi" Zarhin (Hebrew: שמעון "שמי" זרחין; born 9 August 1961) is an Israeli novelist and film director.

== Early life and education ==
He was born in Tiberias and studied film at Tel Aviv University.

His brother is the actor Lior Zohar.

== Career ==
His movies include titles such as Bonjour Monsieur Shlomi (2003), Aviva My Love (2006), and The World is Funny (2012). His first novel Some Day was a bestseller in Israel and has been translated into English by Yardenne Greenspan.

In March 2020 Helicon Music released the soundtrack for Aviva My Love

In 2025, his 1995 film, Lilsada (Passover Fever) was adapted into a play at Haifa Theater.

== Filmography ==
=== Film ===
- Ha-Kesem Ha'aharon Shel Saba, short film (1987)
- Lilsada (Passover Fever) (1995)
- Dangerous Acts (1998)
- Bonjour Monsieur Shlomi (2003)
- Aviva, My Love (2006)
- The World Is Funny (2012)
- The Kind Words (2015)
- Silent (2022)
- Bliss (2025)

== Awards ==
- Kugel Prize for literature, awarded by the Municipality of Holon (2013)
