= Sweet Mud =

2006 Israeli film

- Film poster
- אדמה משוגעת
- Directed by: Dror Shaul
- Written by: Dror Shaul
- Produced by: Sharon Shamir, Dror Shaul, Philippa Kowarski, Edgard Tenembaum, Bettina Brokemper, Johannes Rexin, Makoto Ueda
- Starring: Tomer Steinhof; Ronit Yudkevitz; Pini Tavger; Henri Garcin; Daniel Kitsis
- Cinematography: Sebastian Edschmid
- Edited by: Isaac Sehayek
- Release date: September 9, 2006 (Toronto International Film Festival)
- Running time: 97 mins
- Language: Hebrew
- Budget: $1,500,000

Sweet Mud (Hebrew: אדמה משוגעת, romanized: Adamah Mishuga'at, lit. 'Crazy Land') is a 2006 Israeli satirical drama film written and directed by Dror Shaul. The semi-autobiographical film was shot on the kibbutzim of Ruhama and Nir Eliyahu, and draws on Shaul's memories of growing up on a kibbutz with his mentally unstable and widowed mother. This was the first film of the acting career of Daniel Kitsis.

== Plot ==
Set in 1974, Dvir (Tomer Steinhof) is soon to turn 13 and lives with his mother Miri (Ronit Yudkevitz) at a progressive kibbutz populated by people who take pride in their open-minded attitudes. However, they're not so easygoing when it comes to Miri; she's been sent to a mental hospital more than once, and her instability is more than most of the residents want to deal with, leaving Dvir to look after his mother with the help of his older brother Eyal (Pini Tavger). Miri persuades her Swiss boyfriend Stephan (Henri Garcin) to join her at the kibbutz, even though he isn't Jewish, but he isn't welcomed by other residents, and an unpleasant incident involving a neighbor's dog turns the couple into outcasts. In the midst of all this, Dvir is trying to prepare for his bar mitzvah, which at the kibbutz is combined with a severe regimen of survival training; he also gets a crash course in his ongoing maturity when he develops a crush on Maya (Daniel Kitsis), a cute girl his age.

== Cast ==
- Tomer Steinhof as Dvir
- Ronit Yudkevitz as Miri
- Shai Avivi as Avraham
- Pini Tavger as Eyal
- Gal Zaid as Shimshon
- Henri Garcin as Stephan
- Daniel Kitsis as Maya
- Idit Tzur as Hanna
- Yosef Carmon as Zvi
- Sharon Zuckerman as Etty
- Rivka Neumann as Zila
- Ami Weil as Uzi
- Hila Ofer as Linda
- Omer Berger as Ronen
- Natan Sgan-Cohen as Avi

== Critical reception ==
Sweet Mud received generally favorable reviews from critics. At Rotten Tomatoes, the film holds a rating of 82%, based on 11 reviews and an average rating of 7/10. The Toronto Star called it "an appealing coming-of-age tale that takes on the difficult issues of mental illness and conformity", providing two contrasting views of kibbutz life: on one hand, "an idyllic pastoral life where the fruits of labour and a strong sense of community are shared by all," and on the other, "a place of rigid rules, where children sleep in segregated quarters away from their parents, baby bottles are dispensed in a regimented maternity ward-type system and where disapproval of individual idiosyncrasies can easily become a communal decision that isolates and ostracizes."

== Awards ==
The film received four 2006 Ophir Awards from the Israeli Academy of Film and Television (Best Film, Best Music, Best Production Design, Best Sound) and six other nominations (Best Actor, Best Actress, Best Director, Best Screenplay, Best Costume Design, Best Editing). It also won the World Cinema Jury Prize (Dramatic) at the 2007 Sundance Film Festival and was Israel's official submission for Best Foreign Language Film at the 2007 Academy Awards.

Awards
Preceded by 13 Tzameti	Grand Jury Prize: World Cinema Dramatic; 2007	Succeeded by The King of Ping Pong
