= Savi Gabizon =

Israeli filmmaker

- שבי גביזון
- Born: 23 July 1960 (age 65)
- Occupations: film director; screenwriter; film producer
- Known for: Shuroo (1991); Lovesick on Nana Street (1995); Nina's Tragedies (2003)

Savi (Shabtay) Gabizon (Hebrew: שבי גביזון; born 23 July 1960) is an Israeli filmmaker, screenwriter and producer. In addition, he is also an adjunct professor in the film department of Tel Aviv University.

== Career ==
Gabizon was born and raised in Kiryat Yam, near Haifa, the son of parents born in Turkey. In 1974 he enrolled in the Haifa military academy. After military service in the IDF's filming unit, he enrolled at Tel Aviv University, where he graduated in 1987 with a BA in film and television. Since 1993 he has taught film direction and scriptwriting there. He also teaches at the Sam Spiegel Film and Television School and at the Camera Oscura School of Art, both in Tel Aviv. He is a reservist in the film unit of the Israeli Army, and director of the drama department at the Reshet TV network.

== Films ==
In 1986 Gabizon made a short, They Call Me Itzik. His first feature film, Shuroo, a satirical social comedy which he both wrote and directed, was released in 1991. It was a box office success, and won several prizes, including seven Ophir Awards from the Israeli Academy of Film and Television, best actor award at the Haifa International Film Festival, and the Wolgin Award at the Jerusalem International Film Festival.

His second film, Lovesick on Nana Street (Choleh Ahava B'Shikun Gimmel), another satirical social comedy which he both wrote and directed, came out in 1995. It also was a popular success, and won numerous prizes including eight Israeli Academy Ophir Awards, and the Wolgin Award and Lipper Prize at the Jerusalem festival in 1995. It also won the audience prize and a special mention at the International Filmfestival Mannheim-Heidelberg, the jury prize at the São Paulo International Film Festival and the critics' prize at Haifa in 1996.

Gabizon's third film, Nina's Tragedies (Ha-Asonot Shel Nina), was released in 2003. It won eleven Ophir Awards and was the first Israeli narrative feature to be shown at the Sundance Film Festival in Utah, in the United States. It was subsequently released in the United States.

In 2017, he directed Longing.
