= Khalifa Natour =

Palestinian actor (born 1965)

Khalifa Natour (Arabic: خليفة ناطور) is an Israeli Arab actor. Born in Qalansawe in 1965-1966, Natour attended Beit Zvi School for the Performing Arts where he played Othello and Timon of Athens (among other roles) in student productions. He graduated from Beit Zvi in 1991. Since then he has performed on the stage and in films, both inside and outside Israel. His film credits include The Band's Visit (2007), The Other Son (2012), and Tikkun (2015). He has one of the lead roles in season three (2020) of the Netflix television series Fauda.
