= Ophir Award =

Israeli film award

- פרס אופיר
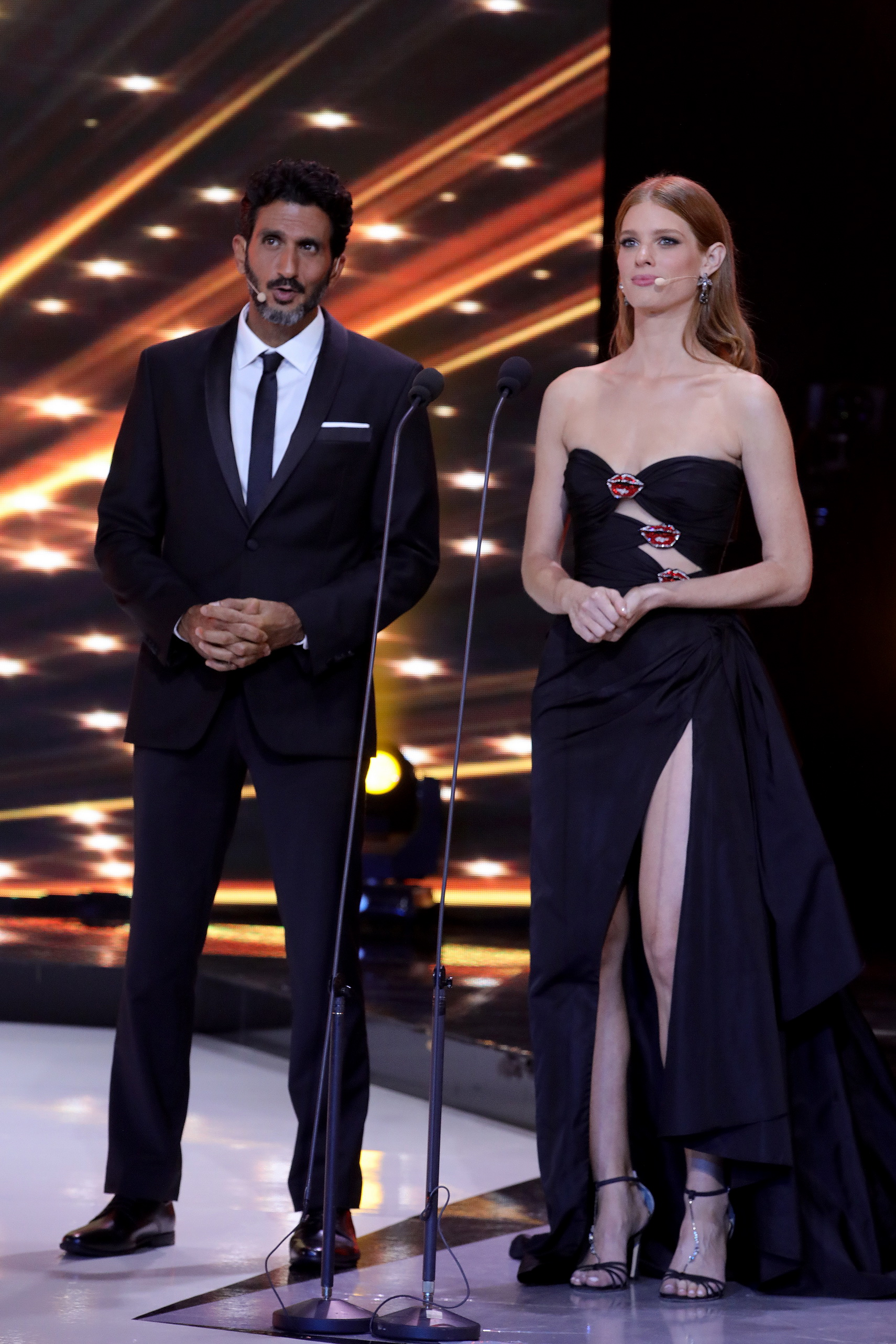
- Tzachi Halevy (left) and Yuval Scharf (right) hosting the 2019 Ophir Awards
- Awarded for: Best in film
- Country: Israel
- Presented by: Israeli Academy of Film and Television
- First award: 1990; 36 years ago
- Website: www.israelfilmacademy.co.il

The Ophir Awards (Hebrew: פרס אופיר), full name: the Israel Film Academy Award, sometimes also known as the Israeli Oscars or the Israeli Academy Awards, are film awards for excellence in the Israeli film industry awarded by the Israeli Academy of Film and Television. The award, named after Israeli actor Shaike Ophir, has been granted since 1990.

The Academy Awards ceremony takes place every year in September, about four months before the announcement of the nominees for the American Academy Award. The winner of the "Best Film" award is sent as Israel's representative to compete for an Oscar nomination in the "Best Foreign Film Oscar Award" category. Out of the winners of the Ophir Award in the "Best Film" category over the years, 10 films have been chosen to be nominated for the Oscar Award in the "Best Foreign Film" category.

== History ==
The predecessors of the award were the Israeli Film Center Award (פרסי מרכז הסרט הישראלי) and the Silver Menorah Award (פרסי מנורת הכסף). The first Israeli Academy Awards ceremony was held since the establishment of the academy in 1990 It was held annually at the Tel Aviv Performing Arts Center. In 2004 it was renamed the Ophir Awards after Shaike Ophir. The award holds annual competitions in the field of feature and documentary cinema among the films produced that year. The Ophir Awards are awarded in 18 categories in the field of Israeli cinematic creation.

Since 2003, the Academy has held a separate ceremony for television programs. Before the establishment of the Academy, the "Kinor David" was awarded in the years 1963 - 1986 to creators in various fields of Israeli culture. The award was given both in the field of cinema and in the field of communication (where awards were given for television programs). Starting in 2003, these awards are given separately as part of the "Awards of the Israel Television Academy".

The year 2004 is known as the record year for viewing percentages of Israeli films and the record year for the Ophir Awards ceremony: 23 feature films competed, including the blockbusters "Turn Left at the End of the World", "Campfire" and "Walk on Water".

As of 2022, The highest number of Ophir Awards won by a single film is 11, for the film "Nina's Tragedies", which in 2003 won 11 awards out of a possible 13 (not including the "Best Documentary" award and "Lifetime Achievement Award"), including the best film, but lost the best actor award to Aryeh Elias and the best composer award to Ehud Banai (both from the film "James' Journey to Jerusalem"). The record for winnings per person belongs to Assi Dayan and Gil Toran, who won 8 Ophir awards each. Assi Dayan is also the only one who won awards for directing, writing and acting.

The award is televised every year. In the beginning it was broadcast on Channel 2 as part of Keshet Medial Group broadcasts, and then the broadcast moved to Channel 10. In 2016 the ceremony was broadcast live on Channel 24 and then returned a second Channel 12.

The winner of the Best Film award usually becomes Israel's submission for the Academy Award for Best International Feature Film, although exceptions include Aviva My Love (which was rejected in favor of the film it tied with, Sweet Mud) and The Band's Visit, which was disqualified for having more than 50% of its dialogue in English. Israel submitted the runner-up for that year—Beaufort—instead. The latter film was eventually nominated for the Academy Award for Best International Feature Film.

The statuette awarded to prize winners was designed by the Israeli sculptor Richard Shiloh, who was killed in a motorcycle accident in 2011.

The categories in which the award is distributed:

- Best Movie
- Best Director
- Best Lead Actor
- Best Lead Actress
- Best Supporting Actor
- Best Supporting Actress
- Best Shot
- Best Original Screenplay
- Best Edit
- Best Artistic Design
- Best Costume Design
- Best Original Music
- Best Soundtrack
- Best Makeup
- Best Casting
- Best Documentary
- Best Short Documentary
- Lifetime Achievement Award
- Best Short Feature Film

In addition, almost every year awards are given for lifetime achievement and a recognition award for professional achievements.

== List of winners ==
- 1990: The Lookout (Shuroo)
- 1991: Beyond the Sea
- 1992: Life According to Agfa
- 1993: Revenge of Itzik Finkelstein
- 1994: Sh'Chur
- 1995: Lovesick on Nana Street
- 1996: Saint Clara
- 1997: Pick a Card
- 1998: Circus Palestine
- 1999: Yana's Friends
- 2000: Time of Favor
- 2001: Late Marriage
- 2002: Broken Wings
- 2003: Nina's Tragedies
- 2004: Campfire
- 2005: What a Wonderful Place
- 2006: Aviva, My Love and Sweet Mud
- 2007: The Band's Visit
- 2008: Waltz with Bashir
- 2009: Ajami
- 2010: The Human Resources Manager
- 2011: Footnote
- 2012: Fill the Void
- 2013: Bethlehem
- 2014: Gett: The Trial of Viviane Amsalem
- 2015: Baba Joon
- 2016: Sand Storm
- 2017: Foxtrot
- 2018: The Cakemaker
- 2019: Incitement
- 2020: Asia
- 2021: Let There Be Morning
- 2022: Cinema Sabaya
- 2023: Seven Blessings
- 2024: Come Closer
- 2025: The Sea

== Awards ceremonies ==
This is a list of Ophir Award ceremonies.

=== Ceremonies ===
Ceremony	Date	Time	Best Picture Winner	Length of Ceremony	Number of Viewers	Rating	Host(s)	Venue	Broadcast Partner(s)
—	1984	—	Beyond the Walls	—	—	—	—	—	—
—	1985	—	When Night Falls	—	—	—	—	—	—
—	1986	—	Avanti Popolo	—	—	—	—	—	—
—	1987	—	I Don't Give a Damn	—	—	—	—	—	—
—	1988	—	Aviya's Summer	—	—	—	—	—	—
—	1989	—	One of Us	—	—	—	—	—	—
1st Ophir Awards	1990	—	The Lookout	—	—	—	—	—	—
2nd Ophir Awards	1991	—	Beyond the Sea	—	—	—	—	—	—
3rd Ophir Awards	1992	—	Life According to Agfa	—	—	—	—	—	—
4th Ophir Awards	1993	—	Revenge of Itzik Finkelstein	—	—	—	—	—	—
5th Ophir Awards	1994	—	Sh'Chur	—	—	—	—	—	—
6th Ophir Awards	1995	—	Lovesick on Nana Street	—	—	—	—	—	—
7th Ophir Awards	1996	—	Saint Clara	—	—	—	—	—	—
8th Ophir Awards	1997	—	Pick a Card	—	—	—	—	—	—
9th Ophir Awards	1998	—	Circus Palestine	—	—	—	—	—	—
10th Ophir Awards	1999	—	Yana's Friends	—	—	—	—	—	—
11th Ophir Awards	2000	—	Time of Favor	—	—	—	Aki Avni	—	—
12th Ophir Awards	2001	—	Late Marriage	—	—	—	Yael Abecassis	—	—
13th Ophir Awards	2002	—	Broken Wings	—	—	—	Avi Kushnir	—	—
14th Ophir Awards	September 24, 2003	—	Nina's Tragedies	—	—	—	—	—	—
Since 2003 the ceremony split into two ceremonies: a separate ceremony for television and a separate ceremony for films. This was also the first ceremony which been held in late September instead of October, due to the US Academy Awards brought forward from March to February.
Since 2004, the award name changed from "Israeli Oscar" to "Ophir Award," named after actor Shaike Ophir.
15th Ophir Awards	September 27, 2004	8:45 p.m.	Campfire	—	—	—	Avi Kushnir	Tel Aviv Performing Arts Center	Channel 2
16th Ophir Awards	September 20, 2005	—	What a Wonderful Place	—	—	—	Moni Moshonov	Tel Aviv Performing Arts Center	HOT3
17th Ophir Awards	September 14, 2006	8:00 p.m.	Aviva, My Love and Sweet Mud (tie)	2 hours, 38 minutes	—	—	Shlomo Bar-Aba, Moni Moshonov	Tel Aviv Performing Arts Center	—
18th Ophir Awards	September 20, 2007	8:00 p.m.	The Band's Visit	1 hour, 41 minutes	—	—	Tal Friedman, Moni Moshonov	Tel Aviv Performing Arts Center	Channel 2 (Not Live)
19th Ophir Awards	September 23, 2008	—	Waltz with Bashir	—	—	—	Shai Goldstein, Dror Refael	Tel Aviv Performing Arts Center	Channel 10
20th Ophir Awards	September 26, 2009	—	Ajami	—	—	—	Avi Kushnir, Moni Moshonov	Haifa Auditorium	Channel 2
21st Ophir Awards	September 21, 2010	9:30 p.m.	The Human Resources Manager	—	—	—	Aki Avni	Jerusalem Theatre	Channel 1
22nd Ophir Awards	September 22, 2011	8:45 p.m.	Footnote	2 hour, 12 minutes	—	—	Moni Moshonov	Krieger Center for Performing Arts	Channel 2; 90 minutes were broadcast live.
23rd Ophir Awards	September 21, 2012	1:00 p.m.	Fill the Void	—	—	—	Shlomo Bar-Aba	Krieger Center for Performing Arts	Channel 2 Air an edited version in 10:00 p.m.
24th Ophir Awards	September 28, 2013	9:00 p.m.	Bethlehem	—	—	—	Yaron Brovinsky	Haifa Theatre	Channel 10
25th Ophir Awards	September 21, 2014	9:00 p.m.	Gett: The Trial of Viviane Amsalem	—	—	—	Moni Moshonov	Ashdod Performing Arts Center	Channel 10
26th Ophir Awards	September 21, 2015	9:00 p.m.	Baba Joon	—	—	—	Tal Friedman	Ashdod Performing Arts Center	Channel 10
27th Ophir Awards	September 22, 2016	9:00 p.m.	Sand Storm	—	—	—	Guri Alfi	Ashdod Performing Arts Center	Channel 24
28th Ophir Awards	September 19, 2017	—	Foxtrot	—	—	—	Ilan Peled	Ashdod Performing Arts Center	Channel 10
29th Ophir Awards	September 6, 2018	—	The Cakemaker	—	—	—	Ilan Peled	Ashdod Performing Arts Center	Channel 13
30th Ophir Awards	September 22, 2019	—	Incitement	—	—	—	Tzachi Halevy, Yuval Scharf	—	Kan 11
31st Ophir Awards	November 13, 2020	—	Asia	—	—	—	Kobi Meaden	—	Kan 11
32nd Ophir Awards	October 5, 2021	9:15 p.m.	Let There Be Morning	—	—	—	Alma Zack, Shai Avivi	—	Kan 11
33rd Ophir Awards	September 18, 2022	11:00 p.m.	Cinema Sabaya	—	—	—	—		Kan 11
34th Ophir Awards	September 10, 2023	—	Seven Blessings	—	—	—	—	—	—
35th Ophir Awards	September 16, 2024		Come Closer						
36th Ophir Awards	September 16, 2025		The Sea				Shira Naor, Tom Yaar	—	

=== Award Records ===
Record nominations for a film (general): 15 - "The World is Funny" (2012) [8], "Image of Victory" (2021), "Let it be Morning" (2021)

Record of wins for a film (overall): 11 – "Nina's Tragedies" (2003)

Record of wins per person (general): 10 - Israel David (all in the soundtrack category)

Record of wins for the soundtrack: 10 - Israel David

Record of wins for editing: 7 - Einat Glazer-Zarhin

Record of winnings for photography: 4 - David Gurfinkel

Record of wins for an actress: 3 - Ronit Elkebetz (3 main actress), 3 - Dana Ivgy (2 main actress; 1 supporting actress), 3 - Anat Waxman (1 main actress; 2 supporting actress), 3 - Raymond Amsalem (1 main actress, 2 supporting actress)

Record wins for a player: 4 - Sasson Gabai (2 main player; 2 secondary player)

Record of winnings for a screenplay: 4 - Savi Gabizon ("The Lookout", "Lovesick on Nana Street", "Nina's Tragedies" and "Longing")

Record of wins for directing: 3 - Savi Gabizon ("The Lookout", "Lovesick on Nana Street" and "The Lookout")

Record of wins for the documentary film: 2 - Arnon Goldfinger, Nadav Shirman, Shlomi Elder

=== Ceremony hosts ===
The following have hosted (or co-hosted) the Academy Awards ceremony on two or more occasions.

Host	Number of Ceremonies
Moni Moshonov	5
Avi Kushnir	2
Shlomo Bar-Aba	2
Tal Friedman	2
Ilan Peled	2

== See also ==
- Cinema of Israel
- Israeli Academy of Film and Television
- List of Israeli submissions for the Academy Award for Best International Feature Film
- Awards of the Israeli Television Academy
