= Kobi Farag =

Israeli actor and filmmaker

- 'קובי פרג
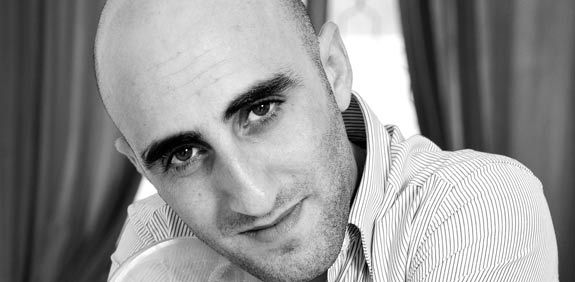
- Kobi Farag
- Born: 31 August 1980 (age 46); Petah Tikva, Israel
- Occupations: Actor; voice actor; radio broadcaster; comedian; film director
- Years active: 2003–present

Kobi Farag (Hebrew: קובי פרג'; born 31 August 1980) is an Israeli actor and filmmaker.

== Early life ==
Farag was born and raised in Petah Tikva, Israel, to an Iraqi Jewish family from Iraq, who are known as photographers.

== Career ==
Farag started his career in the Israel Defense Forces Theatre, as part of an ensemble with Ilan Rozenfeld and Oded Paz. They were his co-creators of the cult series HaPijamot, a sitcom about a struggling band.

He appeared in television series, sketch-comedy shows and feature films.

He is an actor for the Cameri Theater of Tel Aviv and hosts a weekly radio program at the Israeli Defense Force radio beginning in 2012.

In 2016, his debut documentary film about his family Photo Farag Film premiered at the Jerusalem Film Festival

In 2022, he acted in the comedy-drama film Karaoke directed by Moshe Rosenthal.
