= Bienstock =

Bienstock is a surname. Notable people with the surname include:

- Freddy Bienstock (1923–2009), Swiss-American music publisher
- Jay Bienstock (born 1965), American television producer
- Miriam Bienstock (1923–2015), American record company executive
- Naya Bienstock (born 2001), Israeli actress
- Ric Esther Bienstock, Canadian documentary filmmaker
