= Shukron =

Shukron is a Hebrew surname. Notable people with the surname include:

- Eli Shukron, Israeli archaeologist
- Eshkol Shukron Israeli military commander best known as commander of the Golan Territorial Brigade in Golan Heights
- Rita Shukron (born 1956), Israeli actress, recipient of the 2002 Ophir Award for Karaoke
