= Noa Cohen =

Israeli actress and model (born 2002)

- נֹועָה כֹּהֵן
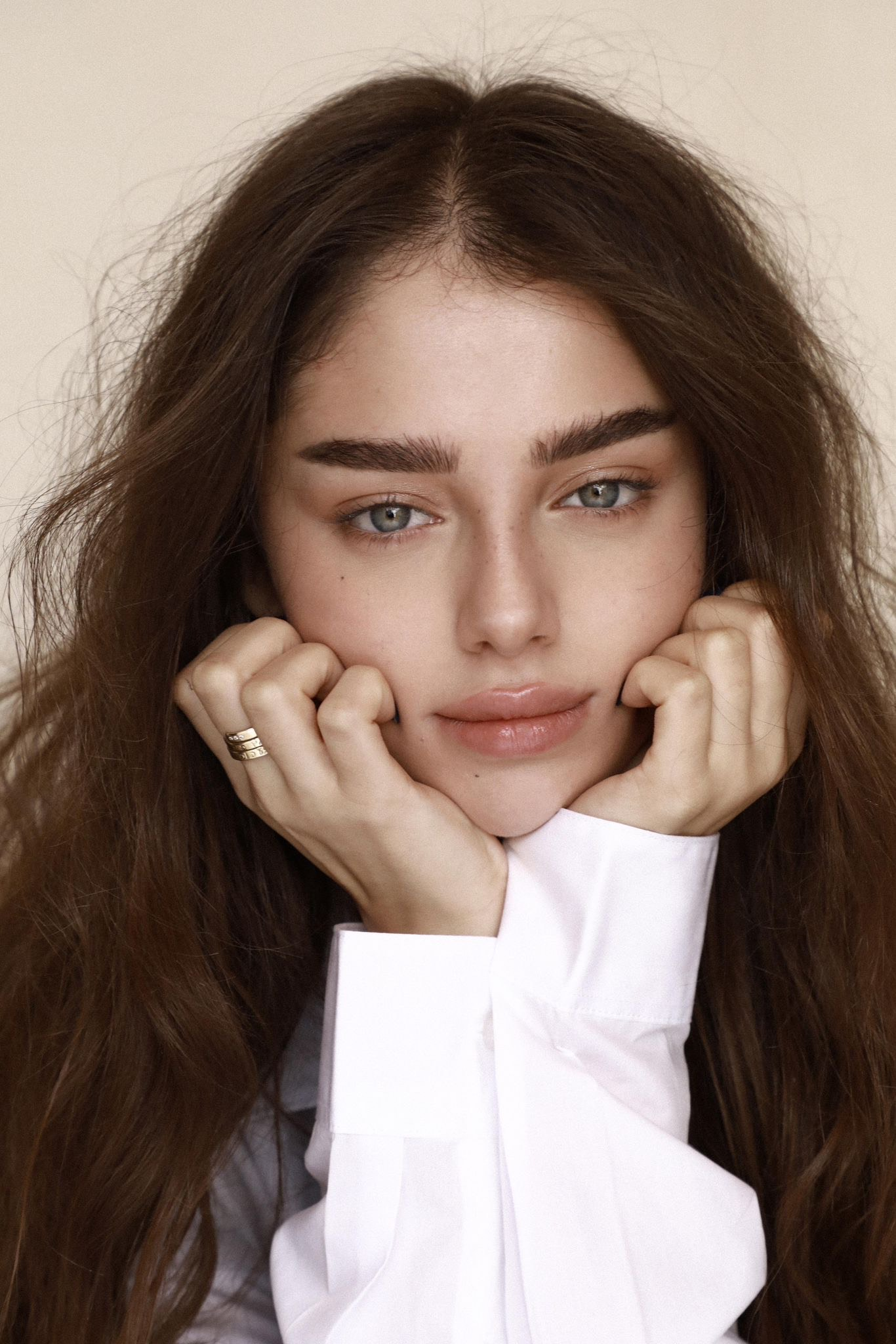
- Cohen in 2024
- Born: 3 August 2002 (age 24); Hod Hasharon, Israel
- Occupations: Actress; model; television host
- Years active: 2018–present
- Website: Noa Cohen IMDB

Noa Cohen (Hebrew: נֹועָה כֹּהֵן; born 3 August 2002) is an Israeli actress, model, and television host. She is known for her portrayal of the Virgin Mary in the 2024 Netflix biblical epic drama film Mary, starring alongside Anthony Hopkins.

== Early and personal life ==
Noa Cohen was born in Hod Hasharon, Israel, and is Jewish.

She partnered with Starting Over Sanctuary, an Israeli non-profit-organization focused on pets and animal safety.

== Career ==
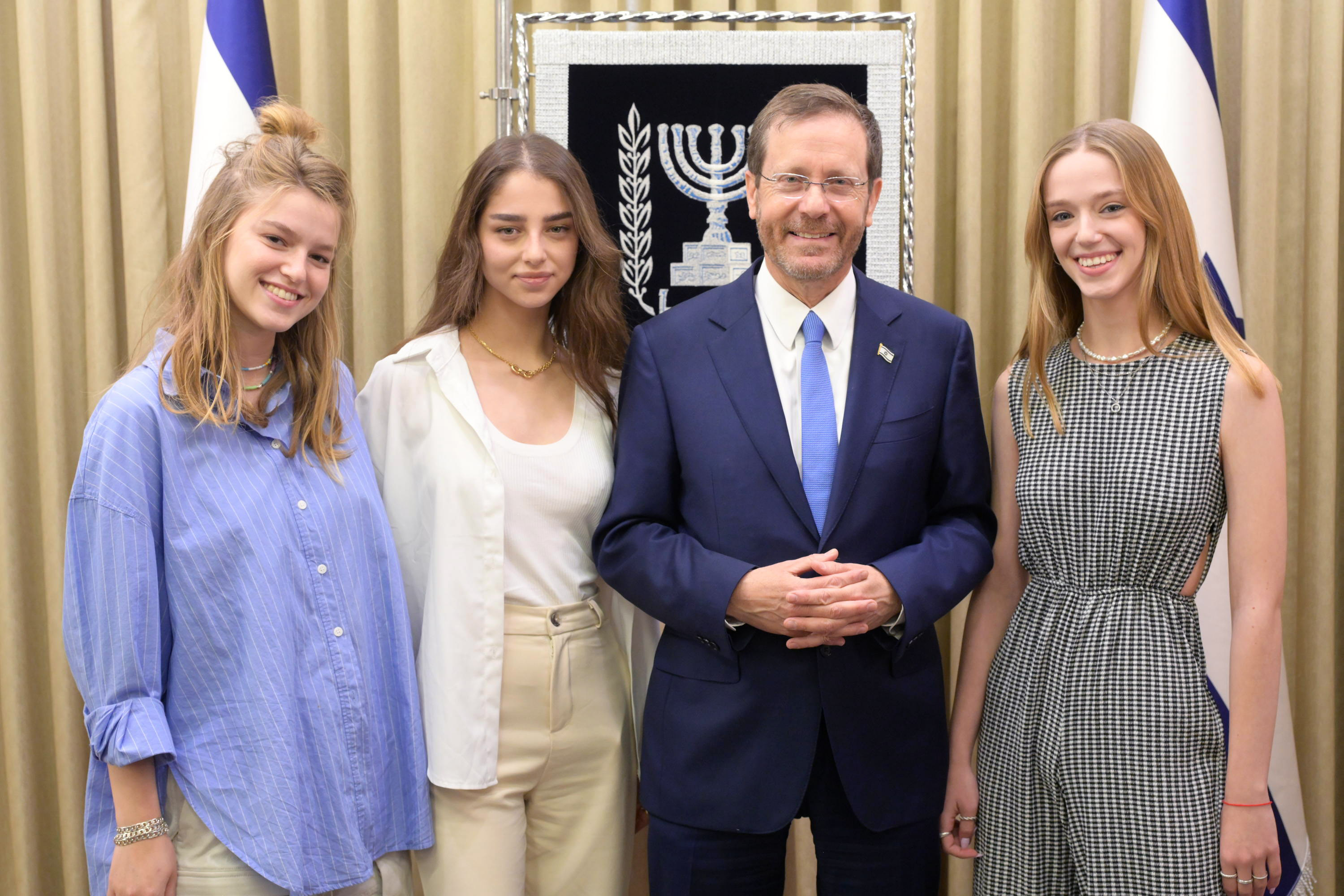
(Left to right:) Naya Bienstock, Noa Cohen, President Isaac Herzog, and Ravid Ronen in 2022

Cohen modeled for various fashion and cosmetic brands, such as Veet, Jennyunique, Bar Refaeli's hoodies brand, Smashbox Cosmetics (by Estée Lauder), Essence Cosmetics and BananHot.

She began her media career working for Channel Reshet 13. She began acting professionally in 2018, landing her first television role in the sitcom My Sister Skipped A Grade. She went on to appear in various Israeli television shows including My Nephew From Hell (2021), Infinity (2022) and 8200 (2024). In 2022, she made her film debut in the spy thriller Silent Game.

In 2024, Cohen was cast as the Virgin Mary in D. J. Caruso's biblical epic film Mary, starring alongside Ido Tako and Sir Anthony Hopkins.

== Filmography ==
=== Film ===
Year	Title	Role	Notes
2022	Silent Game	Shiryn	
2024	Mary	Mary of Nazareth	
2026	Our Loves	Liri	

=== Television ===
Year	Title	Role	Notes
2018	My Sister Skipped A Grade		2 episodes
2021-2025	My Nephew From Hell	Neta Abexasis	14 episodes
2022	Infinity	Gili	5 episodes
2024	8200		8 episodes
2026	Rokdim Im Kokhavim	Herself	Contestant (Season 12)
