= Mary Aloe =

American film and television producer

- Occupations: Film and television producer, author
- Years active: 1990s–present
- Website: maryaloe.com

Mary Aloe is an American film and television producer and founder of Aloe Entertainment. Her career has included independent film production, film financing, and television production. Her producing and executive-producing work includes Battle in Seattle, Bruised, Flag Day, Freud's Last Session, Rumours, and the 2024 biblical drama Mary.

In 2023, Aloe was named head of feature films at Partners in Kind, a film and television venture backed by a $50 million equity fund.

Aloe is also the author of the forthcoming devotional book Let It Be Me: Sacred Lessons from Mary, Mother of Jesus, for Your Daily Life, scheduled for publication by The Open Field, an imprint of Penguin Random House, on November 10, 2026.

== Education and early career ==
Aloe began her career in entertainment journalism, writing for magazines including Us Weekly. She subsequently moved into television production, working as an associate producer for Geraldo.

Aloe worked for Paramount Television in connection with the syndicated newsmagazine Hard Copy before moving into film production. Her first executive-producer credit was the 2001 television film The Princess and the Marine.

== Aloe Entertainment ==
Aloe is the founder of Aloe Entertainment, through which she has developed and produced film and television projects. In a 2021 profile, Script Magazine discussed Aloe's work through the company, including film development, acquiring rights, financing, and independent production.

== Film career ==
During the 2000s, Aloe produced a number of independent films. She was a producer of Battle in Seattle, the 2007 film written and directed by Stuart Townsend. She also produced While She Was Out, starring Kim Basinger.

Her later producing work included Killerman, starring Liam Hemsworth, which was released in 2019.

Aloe was an executive producer of Bruised, directed by and starring Halle Berry, and a co-producer of Flag Day, directed by Sean Penn.

== Recent projects ==
=== Mary ===
Aloe produced the 2024 biblical drama Mary, directed by D. J. Caruso and starring Noa Cohen as Mary and Anthony Hopkins as King Herod. Deadline Hollywood reported on the production in April 2024, identifying Aloe as a producer alongside Hannah Leader, Gillian Hormel, and Joshua Harris.

The film was acquired by Netflix for distribution and released in December 2024.

=== Hershey ===
Aloe is a producer of Hershey, a biographical drama about The Hershey Company founder Milton S. Hershey and his wife Catherine "Kitty" Hershey. The film is directed by Mark Waters and stars Finn Wittrock and Alexandra Daddario. Variety reported in 2025 that Aloe was among the film's producers and that production was planned in Pennsylvania.

IndieWire also reported on the production and Waters' involvement as director, while CBS News reported that filming was scheduled to take place in the Pittsburgh area.

=== A Statement ===
Aloe is a producer of A Statement, a 2026 drama film directed by Tom McCarthy, starring Paul Rudd, Paul Giamatti, John Turturro, Amy Ryan, and Evan Peters. Previously known as The Statement during development, the film explores the political and scientific challenges surrounding climate change. It premiered at the 2026 New York Film Festival. Sony Pictures Classics identified Aloe as one of the film's producers in its January 2026 production announcement.

=== Alpha Gang ===
Aloe is a producer of Alpha Gang, a 2026 science-fiction comedy written and directed by David Zellner and Nathan Zellner. The film stars Cate Blanchett, Chris Pine, Dave Bautista, Léa Seydoux, Lily-Rose Depp, and Riley Keough. The story follows a group of extraterrestrials disguised as a 1950s motorcycle gang who arrive on Earth on a secret mission. The film premiered at the 2026 Telluride Film Festival and subsequently screened at the Toronto International Film Festival.

=== A Road Map to Happiness ===
Aloe serves as an executive producer of A Road Map to Happiness, a documentary television series exploring happiness and well-being across different cultures and communities. The series features Jason Momoa, Shailene Woodley, Elijah Wood, and Alec Baldwin. In October 2026, Deadline Hollywood reported that Emilia Clarke and Josh Brolin had also joined the project. The series was announced in January 2026, with a planned release in 2027.

=== Let It Be Me ===
Aloe is the author of Let It Be Me: Sacred Lessons from Mary, Mother of Jesus, for Your Daily Life, a devotional book scheduled for publication on November 10, 2026, by The Open Field, an imprint of Penguin Random House.

== Filmography ==
=== Film ===
Year	Title	Credit
2004	Downtown: A Street Tale	Executive producer
2007	Battle in Seattle	Producer
2007	Numb	Executive producer
2007	When a Man Falls in the Forest	Producer
2008	While She Was Out	Producer
2008	Tortured	Producer
2009	Cabin Fever 2: Spring Fever	Producer
2010	Hollywood & Wine	Producer
2015	10,000 Saints	Producer
2016	Mothers and Daughters	Executive producer
2016	Wild Oats	Executive producer
2017	55 Steps	Executive producer
2018	Beast of Burden	Producer
2018	Mara	Producer
2018	Dear Dictator	Producer
2019	Killerman	Producer
2020	Worth	Executive producer
2020	Bruised	Executive producer
2020	Breach	Executive producer
2020	Wander	Producer
2020	Disturbing the Peace	Producer
2021	Flag Day	Co-producer
2021	Karen	Producer
2022	Marlowe	Executive producer
2023	Freud's Last Session	Executive producer
2024	Rumours	Executive producer
2024	Mary	Producer
2025	Tin Soldier	Executive producer
2026	Hershey	Producer
2026	Alpha Gang	Producer
2026	A Statement	Producer

=== Television ===
Year	Title	Credit	Ref.
2001	The Princess and the Marine	Executive producer	
2007	Room 401	Producer	
2027	A Roadmap to Happiness	Executive producer	

== Publications ==
- Let It Be Me: Sacred Lessons from Mary, Mother of Jesus, for Your Daily Life (The Open Field/Penguin Random House, 2026)
