= Mary (2024 film) =

2024 epic biblical film by D. J. Caruso

- Netflix poster
- Directed by: D. J. Caruso
- Written by: Timothy Michael Hayes
- Produced by: Mary Aloe; Hannah Leader; Gillian Hormel; Joshua Harris
- Starring: Noa Cohen; Ido Tako; Ori Pfeffer; Hilla Vidor; Dudley O'Shaughnessy; Anthony Hopkins
- Cinematography: Gavin Struthers
- Edited by: Jim Page
- Music by: Timothy Williams
- Production companies: Aloe Entertainment; PeachTree Media Partners; Luna Film Productions; Ludascripts
- Distributed by: Netflix
- Release date: December 6, 2024
- Running time: 112 minutes
- Countries: United States; United Kingdom
- Language: English

Mary is a 2024 epic biblical drama film directed by D. J. Caruso from a screenplay by Timothy Michael Hayes. It follows Mary, mother of Jesus, played by Noa Cohen, from her childhood in Nazareth to the birth of Jesus. The film also stars Ido Tako, Ori Pfeffer, Hilla Vidor, Dudley O'Shaughnessy, and Anthony Hopkins.

A co-production of the United States and the United Kingdom, the film was released on Netflix on December 6, 2024. It received generally negative reviews from critics, as well as mixed response from religious sources. The film also sparked controversy over the casting of Israeli actress Cohen in the title role.

== Plot ==
After years of praying for a child, the angel Gabriel appears to Joachim and tells him that he will have a daughter. In exchange, Joachim and his wife, Anne, are to dedicate their daughter to the service of God. Nine months later, Anne gives birth to Mary in Nazareth. Elsewhere, Herod the Great announces plans to rebuild the Second Temple. Fearing the growing threats to his throne, he orders the death of Aristobulus, the brother of his wife, Mariamne. When Mariamne protests, Herod stabs her himself.

Years later, Joachim and Anne present Mary to the Temple in Jerusalem to be consecrated to God. She is met by Anna the Prophetess and Baba ben Buta, and is educated in the temple until she is a teenager. While washing clothes in a stream, she meets Joseph, who is immediately enamored with her and briskly asks Joachim and Anne for her hand in marriage. After her betrothal, Gabriel appears to Mary and tells her that she will bear a son and name him Jesus. When the High Priests find out about Mary's pregnancy, they cast her out of the temple, though Anna tells her she will return someday.

Mary tells Anne about her pregnancy, and Anne sends her to stay with her cousin Elizabeth, who is also pregnant. The news of Mary's pregnancy begins to spread, and rumors circulate about her supposed promiscuity. When Mary goes to the city to explain herself to Joseph, she is nearly stoned by a mob, but Joseph helps her escape. He assures her that he does not care what people think and promises to love both her and the child. Mary and Joseph are married, but soon enter into hiding and travel to Bethlehem.

Herod's reign becomes increasingly tyrannical, causing unrest among Jews who wish to restore the House of David. Herod learns that the King of the Jews is soon to be born in Bethlehem, threatening his throne. When Mary goes into labor, Joseph seeks out shelter at several inns, but is told that there are no rooms due to the influx of pilgrims in the city for the birth of the Messiah. They find a stable, and Mary finally gives birth to Jesus. Upon hearing of Jesus's birth, Herod orders the Massacre of the Innocents, and Mary and Joseph flee for Egypt. They find shelter with a family along the way, but are soon found by Herod’s guards. After managing to escape, they present Jesus to the Temple in Jerusalem.

== Cast ==
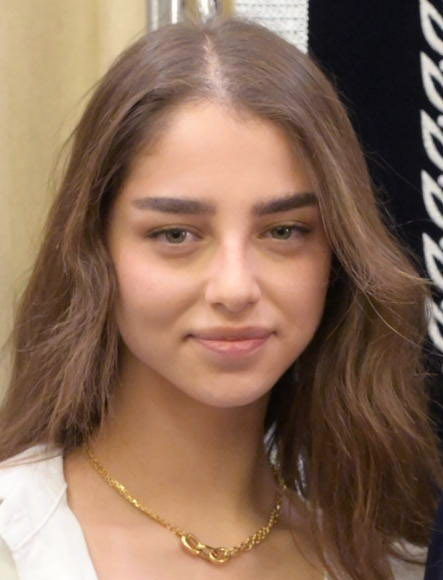
Noa Cohen plays Mary.

- Noa Cohen as Mary, a Jewish girl from Nazareth and the future mother of Jesus.
  - Mila Harris as young Mary
- Ido Tako as Joseph, a Galilean carpenter and Mary's husband.
- Ori Pfeffer as Joachim, Mary's father.
- Hilla Vidor as Anne, Mary's mother.
- Dudley O'Shaughnessy as Gabriel, an angel who announces the birth of Jesus.
- Anthony Hopkins as Herod, Roman client king of Judea.
- Mili Avital as Mariamne, Herod's wife.
- Stephanie Nur as Salome, Herod's sister.
- Gudmundur Thorvaldsson as Marcellus, a Roman military officer under Herod's command
- Salim Benmoussa as High Priest Aristobulus, Mariamne's brother.
- Mehmet Kurtuluş as Baba ben Buta, a Jewish sage who advised Herod to build the Second Temple for atonement.
- Keren Tzur as Elizabeth, Mary's cousin and mother of John the Baptist.
- Allon Sylvain as Zechariah, Elizabeth's husband and father of John the Baptist.
- Eamon Farren as Lucifer, the Devil.
- Almoctar Moumouni Seydou as Balthasar, one of the Magi.
- Saikat Ahamed as Caspar, one of the Magi.
- Jay Willick as Melchior, one of the Magi.
- Susan Brown as Anna, a prophetess whom Mary encounters in the Temple.
- David Gant as Simeon, a righteous man who recognizes and blesses the baby Jesus.

== Production ==
=== Development ===
Director D. J. Caruso, who is a practicing Catholic, was inspired to tell the story of Mary in a "human and relatable" way for audiences. He stated, "I wanted to inspire, particularly younger viewers, to say, 'Wow, Mary could be my friend. A lot of what she went through is contemporary and what's happening in the world today.'" Bishop David G. O'Connell, auxiliary bishop of the Roman Catholic Archdiocese of Los Angeles, served as Caruso's spiritual advisor on the film. Pastor Joel Osteen served as an executive producer on the film.

=== Writing ===
Caruso referred to the Protoevangelium of James for source material on Mary, as well as her parents, Anne and Joachim. Timothy Michael Hayes wrote the original screenplay in 2020 after consulting with various Christian, Jewish, and Muslim religious leaders and scholars. The script underwent 74 drafts before finalization.

=== Casting ===
Around 75 women auditioned for the role of Mary before newcomer Noa Cohen was chosen. Caruso stated, "It was important to us that Mary, along with most of our primary cast, be selected from Israel to ensure authenticity." The decision to cast Israeli actors over Palestinian actors was later met with backlash on social media, citing the broader context of the Gaza genocide.

=== Filming ===
Principal photography took place in Morocco in early 2024. The village of Chefchaouen was used to film the Bethlehem scenes. For scenes in Herod's first temple, the production team modified a former Ridley Scott set. For scenes in Herod's second temple, interiors were shot in a Moroccan museum while exteriors were filmed on a constructed set. Filming was completed by April 2024.

== Release ==
Netflix acquired the film for distribution in September 2024. Promotional stills were released on October 15, 2024, and the trailer was released on November 12, 2024. The film was released on Netflix on December 6, 2024. Upon its release, Caruso traveled to Vatican City to have the film blessed by Pope Francis. He also gifted the pope with a yellow scarf from the film.

== Reception ==
=== Critical reception ===
On the review aggregator website Rotten Tomatoes, 31% of 16 critics' reviews are positive, with an average rating of 4.3/10. Metacritic, which uses a weighted average, assigned the film a score of 27 out of 100, based on six critics, indicating "generally unfavorable" reviews.

The film received mixed reviews from critics. Ronak Kotecha of The Times of India rated the film three out of five stars, writing that it "falls short in its quest to be truly divine". He noted that the screenplay felt restrained and underwhelming, contrary to what one would expect from a religious epic. He commended the performances of Cohen and Hopkins, but noted that the supporting cast's performances were constrained by the script's lack of dimensionality with regards to their characters. He also commended the production design and costuming. Catherine Bray of The Guardian rated the film two out of five stars, calling it "fairly straightforward", but "a wade through dull dramatisations of bits of scripture". She commended the performance of Hopkins as one of the more entertaining parts of the film. Tim Robey of The Daily Telegraph rated the film one out of five stars, calling it "the worst film of the year" and writing that "there's hardly a single moment in Mary which helps us figure out why it was made". He noted the dialogue as "heinous" and the cast's performances as "strangulated". He also criticized the film's lighting and color grading.

Isabella Soares of Collider called the film "surface-level and uninspiring" and wrote, "Mary is tonally uneven, and its script falls flat". Despite the film being marketed as both a coming-of-age film and thriller film, Soares found the film to be neither of the two. She further called the film "a missed opportunity" that "fails to make full use of its protagonist's perspective and show a deeper look at one of the most famous figures in Christianity". Mick LaSalle of the San Francisco Chronicle praised Hopkins performance, but wrote "What we get here is no more real than a Hallmark card, except that it’s a different kind of Hallmark card, one in which Mary has to jump off a roof to escape a burning building and Joseph (Ido Tako) gets into sword fights." Hannah Brown of The Jerusalem Post wrote "During most of the film, Mary looks like a model in a perfume commercial, mixed with one of those catalogs that sell expensive earthenware products and organically made fabrics so you can simplify your life."

John Serba of Decider wrote, "...Mary is highly watchable, with agreeable pacing and an earnest tone funneled through a committed cast", but noted that "the film is at best moderately engaging, and somewhat inadvertently courts indifference." He commended Cohen's performance despite the screenplay's "clunky dialogue", but noted that viewers might be better off rewatching The Greatest Story Ever Told for the "cinematic apex" of the religious epic genre.

=== Religious media response ===
Mary received mixed to negative reviews from Catholic media outlets, largely due to differences between the film's content and Catholic teachings. Amy Welborn of Angelus commented that the film's source material seemed to be "a highly selective mashup of the Gospels, the noncanonical "Protoevangelium of James", [...] and a Joel Osteen sermon". She felt that this, in turn, "create[d] a picture of Mary that is inconsistent, to say the least, with her actual role in the Christian story." Joseph Pronechen of the National Catholic Register noted that the film "portrays the Blessed Mother with reverence but takes troubling liberties with Catholic doctrine", which include depicting Mary having labor pains during childbirth, which he claimed was contrary to Catholic teaching. This, however, has been disputed among Catholic theologians. Pronechen also noted the complete omission of the Magnificat. Nick Olszyk of The Catholic World Report rated the film 1/2 out of five stars, calling it "so strange, haphazard, and poorly written that any profundity and meaning are easily lost".

Non-Catholic media outlets tended to receive the film more favorably. Christopher D. Cunningham of Meridian Magazine, a Church of Jesus Christ of Latter-day Saints publication, "[Y]ou can feel the care and craft that have gone into [the film]. . . . This doesn’t feel like there was a tinkering team of religious advisors sanding down every moment that might conflict with how anyone might see the nativity story. It simply feels like an expression of faith from those who made it." He commended the performances of Cohen, Tako, and Hopkins, and called the production design and effects "top-notch". Mark Judge of Chronicles wrote, "Mary is beautiful, gorgeously shot, and expertly acted film that shows how the Mother of God was human while never diminishing her unique role in the history of the world." He also noted that the film "is what religious conservatives have been begging to see again since the time of The Passion of the Christ: a masterfully done faith-based movie."

== See also ==
- List of films about angels
- Mary, Mother of Jesus (film)
