= The Vanishing Soldier =

- Theatrical release poster
- Directed by: Dani Rosenberg
- Written by: Dani Rosenberg; Amir Kliger
- Produced by: Avraham Pirchi; Chilik Michaeli; Moshe Edery; Leon Edery; Itamar Pirchi
- Starring: Ido Tako
- Cinematography: David Stragmeister
- Edited by: Nili Feller
- Music by: Yuval Semo
- Production companies: Israel Film Fund; United Channel Movies
- Distributed by: Sophie Dulac Distribution (France); United King Films (Israel)
- Release date: August 5, 2023 (Locarno)
- Running time: 105 minutes
- Country: Israel
- Languages: French; Hebrew

The Vanishing Soldier (Hebrew: החייל הנעלם) is a 2023 Israeli war drama thriller film directed by Dani Rosenberg who co-wrote with Amir Kliger. It is about a deserter soldier who sets out on a journey back home but his situation is complicated when his superiors think he was kidnapped by the enemy. It stars Ido Tako accompanied by Mika Reiss, Efrat Ben Zur, Tiki Dayan and Shmulik Cohen.

The Vanishing Soldier had its world premiere on August 5, 2023, at the 76th Locarno Film Festival, where it competed for the Golden Leopard. The film received 11 Ophir Award nominations including Best Picture.

== Synopsis ==
A year from today. Shlomi, an 18-year-old soldier, flees the Gaza Strip battlefield and makes his way back to his girlfriend Shiri. When Shlomi discovers that the military elite is convinced he was kidnapped during the fog of war, he no longer hides from the soldiers he believed were chasing after him, but from his own identity, which has become a trap. In spite of his parents’ pleas that he returns to his unit before it's too late, Shlomi takes a desperate chance on love, with dramatic consequences.

== Cast ==
- Ido Tako as Shlomi
- Mika Reiss as Shiri
- Efrat Ben Zur as Shlomi's Mother
- Tiki Dayan as Shlomi's Grandmother
- Shmulik Cohen as Shlomi's Father
- Mushy Vider as Deputy Officer

== Release ==
It had its world premiere on August 5, 2023, at the 76th Locarno Film Festival, to later be screened in mid-August of the same year in the Kinoscope section of the 29th Sarajevo Film Festival. It was also invited at the 28th Busan International Film Festival in 'Flash Forward' section and was screened on 8 October 2023.

== Accolades ==
Year	Award / Festival	Category	Recipient	Result	Ref.
2023	Locarno Film Festival	Golden Leopard	The Vanishing Soldier	Nominated	
2023	Ophir Award	Best Picture	The Vanishing Soldier	Nominated	
2023	Ophir Award	Best Director	Dani Rosenberg	Nominated	
2023	Ophir Award	Best Actor	Ido Tako	Nominated	
2023	Ophir Award	Best Supporting Actress	Efrat Ben Zur	Nominated	
2023	Ophir Award	Best Screenplay	Dani Rosenberg & Amir Kliger	Nominated	
2023	Ophir Award	Best Cinematography	David Stragmeister	Won	
2023	Ophir Award	Best Original Music	Yuval Semo	Nominated	
2023	Ophir Award	Best Editing	Nili Feller	Nominated	
2023	Ophir Award	Best Makeup	Shir Matzrafi	Nominated	
2023	Ophir Award	Best Casting	Limor Shmila	Nominated	
2023	Ophir Award	Best Sound	Neal Gibbs	Nominated	
2024	Warsaw Jewish Film Festival	Best Narrative Feature	Seven Blessings	Nominated	
