= While She Was Out =

- Theatrical release poster
- Directed by: Susan Montford
- Written by: Susan Montford (screenplay); Edward Bryant (short story)
- Produced by: Mary Aloe; Don Murphy; Kirk Shaw
- Starring: Kim Basinger; Lukas Haas
- Cinematography: Steve Gainer
- Edited by: William M. Anderson
- Music by: Paul Haslinger
- Distributed by: Anchor Bay Entertainment
- Release dates: September 18, 2008 (Greece); December 12, 2008 (United States)
- Running time: 88 minutes
- Countries: United States; Germany; Canada
- Language: English

While She Was Out is a 2008 American horror-thriller film starring Kim Basinger and Lukas Haas. Basinger plays a suburban housewife who is forced to fend for herself when she becomes stranded in a desolate forest with four murderous thugs. It was written and directed by film producer Susan Montford based on a short story by Edward Bryant which was originally an episode of the TV series The Hidden Room in 1993. The film was produced by Mary Aloe and Don Murphy. Its executive producers included Guillermo del Toro and Basinger. The film was shot in 2006 and had a very limited release in five theaters in Texas during 2008.

== Plot ==
On Christmas Eve, suburban housewife Della Myers gets into an argument with her abusive husband Kenneth. After putting her two children to bed, she drives to the mall to buy some wrapping paper and cards. At the mall, she can't find a parking space for a while and angrily leaves a note on the windshield of a car that is parked using up two parking spaces. She leaves the store as the mall is closing, and the parking lot is nearly deserted. She notices the note is gone from the 'offending' car. As she enters her own car, the car on which she had left the note pulls up behind her.

She confronts the car, and four young men — Huey, Vingh, Tomás and their leader Chuckie — emerge. They threaten to rape her. Della insults Chuckie, and a security guard intervenes, but he is shot dead by Chuckie. As the gang realizes that they have committed a murder, Della manages to start her car and drive away. They follow her, intending to kill her, as she is the only witness. As they pursue her some distance, she eventually crashes her car in a deserted area where homes are under construction. She takes a road flare and a toolbox out of her car, and hides behind a backhoe.

Della runs through the buildings under construction to hide, as they search for her. After some time, the thugs corner and threaten her by name, as they had found her driver's license in her purse in her car. As they have her open the toolbox, she hits Chuckie with a crescent wrench, and escapes again into some nearby woods. In the process of chasing her, Tomás accidentally steps on Huey, who falls through a construction site and dies from a broken neck.

After some hide-and-seek in the woods, Della beats and finally kills Tomás with a lug wrench. She flees through a creek, pursued by Chuckie and Vingh. Della sneaks up on Vingh, kills him with a screwdriver, and hides behind a fallen tree. Chuckie tries to persuade Della to give up; he talks about her kids, saying that he is going to pay them a visit. He tells her what he thinks of her, that she lives a boring life she doesn't want, mistreated by her husband. He finds her, touches her, and teases her face. She holds his hand, pulls him down toward her, and kisses him. He draws his weapon as they engage in foreplay, during which she distracts him. She ignites a road flare and blinds him, takes his gun and shoots him dead.

Della returns home, passing through the same parking lot where the security guard was killed. Her husband Kenneth, now completely drunk, complains that she was out late and is tracking mud throughout the house, but she merely ignores him. She goes upstairs to check on her children, whom are both sleeping. Kenneth asks what she brought him from the mall, but Della points Chuckie's gun at his head and coldly replies, "Nothing".

== Cast ==
- Kim Basinger as Della
- Lukas Haas as Chuckie
- Craig Sheffer as Kenneth
- Jamie Starr as Huey
- Leonard Wu as Vingh
- Luis Chávez as Tomás
- Luke Gair as Terri
- Erika-Shaye Gair as Tammi
- Rachel Hayward as Lynn

== Production ==
In November 2006, it was reported that Kim Basinger would star in the While She Was Out, a thriller written by Susan Montford from a short story by Edward Bryant with Montford making her directorial debut on the film. Filming took place in Vancouver, British Columbia in January 2007. According to Montford, the project came about after a planned project centered on the Manson Girls starring Vincent Gallo fell apart after the September 11 attacks. Following failed attempts at reviving the Manson Girls project, Montford decided to pursue a more straightforward commercial project and upon coming across Bryant's short story decided it would be the perfect premise for such a project.

== Release ==
=== Theatrical ===
The film received a limited U.S. theatrical release via Anchor Bay.

=== Home media ===
It was released directly to video in the United Kingdom.

== Reception ==
=== Critical response ===
While She Was Out received a 38% approval rating on Rotten Tomatoes, based on 16 reviews. According to the L.A. Weekly, it is a "surprisingly enjoyable female revenge tale", describing Basinger's performance as "first-rate" despite "a laughably check-listed, multi-culti band of thugs". The New York Observer called it "ultra-feminist fun" with a "spectacular" ending. Ain't It Cool News called Basinger's performance "her best in years". Bitch magazine dismissed much about the film, saying it "has an ample amount of cheezy genre conventions, problems with pacing, a gaggle of silly villains, huge plot holes and bad production values" but added that it is "really rather fascinating – and notable – as a horror/thriller that actually gives a damn about the female character it puts in harm's way." The L.A. Times said it "eschews all plot and character development for the hackneyed action scenes and grade-Z dialogue", and Filmcritic.com's review said that its "dialogue is somewhere between kindergarten and film school."

== See also ==
- List of Christmas films
