= Tell Me Everything (2026 film) =

2026 film by Moshe Rosenthal

- International promotional poster
- Hebrew: עצמאות
- Directed by: Moshe Rosenthal
- Written by: Moshe Rosenthal
- Produced by: Alona Refua; Maya Fischer; Roi Kurland; Gal Greenspan; Ben Giladi; Moshe Edery
- Starring: Yair Mazor; Ido Tako; Assi Cohen; Keren Tzur; Mor Dimri; Neta Orbach
- Cinematography: Ziv Berkovich
- Edited by: Dafi Farbman
- Music by: Gael Rakotondrabe
- Production companies: Green Productions; Paradise City; Liminal Content
- Release dates: 25 January 2026 (Sundance); 9 July 2026 (Jerusalem)
- Running time: 109 minutes
- Countries: Israel; France; United Kingdom
- Language: Hebrew

Tell Me Everything (Hebrew: "עצמאות", "Independence") is a 2026 drama film written and directed by Moshe Rosenthal. A co-production of Israel, France, and the United Kingdom, it stars Yair Mazor as Boaz, a 12-year-old boy amidst the HIV pandemic who finds out that his father, Meir (Assi Cohen), has a relationship with another man.

The film had its world premiere in the World Cinema Dramatic Competition section of the 2026 Sundance Film Festival on 25 January 2026. It was selected as the Israeli entry for the Best International Feature Film at the 99th Academy Awards.

== Premise ==
Amid the late 1980s pop craze and rising HIV epidemic, twelve-year-old Boaz uncovers a devastating secret about the father he idolizes that threatens to tear his family apart. Across the years, this father-son saga follows his journey to heal the wound and reclaim the bond he never stopped yearning for.

== Cast ==
- Yair Mazor as Boaz
  - Ido Tako as older Boaz
- Assi Cohen as Meir, Boaz's father
- Keren Tzur as Bella, Boaz's mother
- Mor Dimri
- Neta Orbach

== Release ==
Tell Me Everything had its world premiere on 25 January 2026, competing at the World Cinema Dramatic Competition section at the 2026 Sundance Film Festival.

On 9 July 2026, the film opened the 43rd Jerusalem Film Festival at Sultan's Pool before an audience of 6,000.

On 3 August 2026, the film received a record-breaking 16 Ophir Award nominations, the highest number ever granted to a film in the history of the Israeli Film Academy Awards. Eventually, the film won Best Picture, Best Director, and another eight awards at the Ophir Awards.

The film has secured international distribution across France, Australia, New Zealand and Indonesia, alongside a regional deal with HBO CEE across Central and Eastern Europe.

The film was theatrically released in Israel in early September 2026, and less than a month later, it surpassed 100,000 viewers.

The film was dropped from the Geneva International Queer Film Festival (Everybody's Perfect) in Switzerland after pro-Palestinian groups exerted pressure and threatened a boycott unless the creators declared their "stance towards the current Israeli government and the war in Palestine". In response, Rosenthal stated that they do not represent the Israeli government. Later, the producers criticized the festival's demands, asking: "Would Iranian or American filmmakers be asked to make similar declarations about their governments before their films could be shown?".

== See also ==
- List of submissions to the 99th Academy Awards for Best International Feature Film
- List of Israeli submissions for the Academy Award for Best International Feature Film
