= HaPijamot =

- Also known as: The Pajamas
- הַפִּיגָ'מוֹת
- Genre: Sitcom
- Created by: Arik Zilberman; Ruby Duenyas; Yoav Tzafir
- Developed by: Ilan Rosenfeld; Oded Paz; Kobi Farag
- Written by: Arik Zilberman; Ruby Duenyas; Eli Darai
- Directed by: Ruby Duenyas
- Starring: Ilan Rosenfeld; Oded Paz; Kobi Farag; Yaniv Polishook; Alona Tal (season 1–3, guest in season 4); Yamit Sol (season 4–9); Dana Frider (season 5–9); Yuval Segal (season 2 in specific episodes, 4, 6–9); Sean Gitelman (season 8–9); Eli Keren-Asaf; Ruby Duenyas (season 8–9 as main cast member)
- Theme music composer: Yoni Bloch
- Opening theme: "HaPijamot" by Yoni Bloch (season 1–3) "HaPijamot" by Ilan Rosenfeld (season 4) "HaPijamot" by Guy Mezig (season 5–7) "HaPijamot" by Sha'anan Streett (season 8–9)
- Composer: Tal Yardeni
- Country of origin: Israel
- Original language: Hebrew
- No. of seasons: 9
- No. of episodes: 223 (list of episodes)

Production
- Producers: Nava Kolton; Einat Zilber-Damari
- Editors: Ruby Duenyas; Yoav Tzafir
- Running time: About 25 minutes
- Production company: Tedy Productions

Original release
- Network: Arutz HaYeladim
- Release: 6 July 2003 – 15 February 2015

Related
- Mendelbaum Balash Prati (2009–2011); HaPijamot BeCafé Kar-Sol (2007–2008) HaPijamot BaMofa Shel Doval'e (2009)

HaPijamot (Hebrew: הַפִּיגָ'מוֹת, pronounced [hapiˈdʒamot]; lit. The Pajamas) is an Israeli sitcom about a struggling band determined to make it in the real world. The show aired on Arutz HaYeladim (The Children's Channel) and on Channel 2 (Keshet).

== Background ==
The show follows three friends: Ilan, Kobi, and Oded, as they move from Netanya to Tel Aviv to launch their band. Unusually, the characters break the fourth wall, speaking directly to the audience via a white screen; Gary frequently delivers solo asides complaining about his life. More innovative episodes involved interaction, such as letting viewers fast forward/rewind to choose the outcome, record a ringtone, and even a simplified scratch-and-sniff feature. Episodes conclude with the trio washing dishes for Gary while summarizing the events.

== Seasons ==
The 1st season of the show debuted on July 6, 2003, and included 23 episodes which were broadcast 6 days a week. The season ended in a special episode called "My Favorite Episode". Since the show has attracted a large number of viewers, The Children's Channel decided to order another two seasons, which were written and filmed together. Starting from the second season, episodes were broadcast 5 days a week. The 2nd season debuted on March 28, 2004, and included 19 episodes. That season ended with a special episode called "The Gold Pyjamas". The 3rd season of the show premiered on July 1, 2004, and included 20 episodes. The season ended with two special episodes, a documentary episode called "Only The Truth" and a trivia contest about the third season called "This That or That This". After the third season ended, The Children's Channel decided to stop the series, because Alona Tal had left for the US, and the trio filmed a new show on The Music Channel.

A year later, The Children's Channel decided to film a new season in response to high VOD viewing numbers. Alona Tal stayed in the US (but guest starred in five episodes), and the production team picked Yamit Sol to effectively replace her. Yuval Segal, who played Ilan's cousin in three episodes in season two, joined the main cast. This season debuted on August 13, 2006, and included 25 episodes.

In December 2007 The Children's Channel ordered another season. Dana Frider joined the cast for Yuval Segal (who went to study acting in New York), and Yamit Sol was absent in many episodes due to her psychology studies. Eli Keren Asaf was absent in many episodes too (she was drafted to the army). The season was the longest to date, with 36 episodes. It debuted on September 1, 2008.

Several months later, The Children's Channel ordered two more seasons. They were written between January and March 2010. The 6th season began to air on September 1, 2010. These seasons include 25 episodes each. Yuval Segal returned to the main cast. The 7th season aired on September 1, 2011, and included 25 episodes, that season ended on October 9, 2011.

HaPijamot was renewed for two more seasons. The 8th season aired on May 19, 2013. The 9th season aired on January 4, 2015.

== Characters ==
=== Main ===
- Ilan Rosenfeld (Ilan Rosenfeld) – Ilan is the keyboard player of the band and writes a majority of the songs. His main interest is girls, and many episodes involve him trying to get a date, but eventually everything goes wrong. His catchphrase is: "What do I need all this for?! Let's just pack up our bags and move back to Netanya."
- Oded Paz (Oded Paz) – Oded is the drummer for the band. He is very dimwitted but he's the luckiest person in the show. He works at the Hamburgary and often irritates Gary. His catchphrase is "Gotta go, gotta go!".
- Ya'akov "Kobi" Farag (Kobi Farag) – Kobi is the guitarist of the band is always hungry and eats almost anytime he can. He is Gary's nephew and Roni's cousin. He can change clothes remarkably fast, so he has many identities, including Naji Comradin Jackson, an Iraqi who is supposedly the "Chairman of the Association for Apartment Management". He takes advantage of an elderly woman (Ms. Bracha) and always eats at her house.
- Gershon "Gary" Mendelbaum (Yaniv Polishook) – Gary is the owner of the Hamburgary, a burger joint with apparently inedible food. His hot dogs can make someone faint, throw up, or supposedly die (since they are made of fimo). He is Kobi's uncle and Oded's employer. He hates life and is constantly troubled by his wife Shifra and his daughter Roni. Apart from Roni, Gary also has triplets named Poli, Shaike, and Gavri (the names of the three members of HaGashash HaHiver, an Israeli comedy group) who also annoy him. During the last season, Gary discovered "Wikipedia" and tries to change history by editing his and other sitcom characters pages on his magic "Leck-top". Gary says "Why?" every time the situation returns to normal condition.
- Roni Mendelbaum (Eli Keren-Asaf) – Roni is Gary's daughter and thinks badly of her father due to his ignorance. She is referred to as annoying, but she is very talented and usually much smarter than any other character in the show. She always forces Gary to give her money.
- Alona Tal (Alona Tal) – Alona is the background vocalist and percussionist in the band. She is the threesome's neighbor, and they're always fighting over her. Alona Tal is a regular cast member in the first, second, and third seasons and makes guest appearances in the fourth season. Afterwards, she was only reduced to cameos and mentions.
- Yamit Sol (Yamit Sol) – Yamit effectively replaces Alona in the fourth and fifth season, despite officially "[not] replacing Alona". She has her own agenda and is not just the pretty face of the series. She plays percussion and is a background vocalist in the band in the fourth season. In the fifth season, she lives with Dana and learns psychology.
- Nathan Kuperman (Yuval Segal) – Nathan is Ilan's cousin from Beersheba and the band's temporary DJ. He shows up a couple of times in the second season and eventually becomes a main character in the fourth season. He is emotional and cries very loudly when he is either happy or sad.
- Dana Frider (Dana Frider) – Dana Frieder is Shifra's niece and joins the show in the fifth season. However, she doesn't replace Yamit, as they both star in the Fifth season. Yamit has a smaller part in the fifth season. According to the show, 'she went to learn psychology and won't have as much time to run around with the gang' (she actually studied psychology while the fifth season was being filmed). The characters often mention the fact that Dana Frider was in Nolad Lirkod ("Born to Dance", which aired on Israeli television from 2005 to 2008) and did commercials for the Israeli shampoo brand Mehod Kef (Hebrew for "very fun". there is a real shampoo brand called "kef" in Israel.). Dana always clarifies to them that they don't even have the right to fantasize about dating with her.
- Shifra Mendelbaum – Shifra is Gary's wife. Gary is always complaining about her, and claims she is very, very fat and ugly. Whenever she calls Gary, she always complains to him and gives him a lot of chores. She doesn't let him speak, and Gary always starts words without finishing. Shifra is never seen in the show except for two episodes, when the young Shifra is seen in some flashbacks ("Lucky Gum") and as a joke in episode 200 of the ninth season (the episode Shifra comes) when she is played by Galit Gutman, the complete opposite of shifra (in the episode there is a joke about Shfira being on a magazine cover and because she is so big there is only her thigh.). She is also seen in a spinoff, Mendelbaum Private Detective.

=== Recurring ===
- Mr. Avraham Latin (Simon Rosenfeld) – Mr. Latin is introduced a side character in the fourth season. He is an old man that lives in the same building as the others. He is deaf and whenever someone talks to him, he responds by saying "What?" He is played by Ilan's real-life father.
- Ms. Bracha Kirschenberg (Rivka Gur) – Bracha is an elderly woman who owns the building and hates everyone in it. She calls the threesome "Afrikaner hooligans." She is in love with Naji Jackson (one of Kobi's characters) and always allows him to eat at her house. She is the head of the Mossad, according to the episode "Shem Kod Moustache" ("Secrets").
- Ruby Duenyas (Ruby Duenyas) – Ruby is the show's director. He appears many times in the fourth, fifth, and sixth seasons.
- Badash (Nadav Assouline) – The Devil. He was the producer of Gary and Oded Menashe's band. He first appeared in the first season, when he tried to trick Ilan and convince him to join "In Shtink" (Ilan the first star and Ilan the second star). In the fourth season, he represented Mr. Latin in his prosecution against the Pyjamas ("What?", fourth season, first episode). Appears in four episodes in season five and in three episodes in season six.
- Albert (Aryeh Cherner) – Renovated the Hamburgary and the Trio's home in the fourth, fifth, and sixth seasons.
- Shimon Tzimhoni (Nir Ron) – Tzimhoni is Gary's arch enemy; ever since they competed for a student council election, they started an endless feud. He appears twice in the third season, twice in the fourth season, in three episodes in the fifth season, and twice in the sixth season. In the third season, he and Gary competed for the position of mayor. In the fourth season he tried to buy the Hamburgary, in the fifth he opened a business called Tzimhoburger (in Hebrew "Veggieburger") to compete with Gary's, and in the sixth season he met Gary in the prison.
- Malka Kuperman (Effi Ben Israel) – Ilan's aunt and the owner of the trio's apartment. She didn't live in Israel because she's in a delegation of the Israeli Ministry of Foreign Affairs to Austria. She doesn't know that Oded and Kobi live in the apartment, so every time she's visiting Ilan, Kobi and Oded need to find somewhere to stay overnight. She appears twice in the show: in the two last episodes of the first season, and in the first episode of the sixth season.

=== Kobi's characters ===
- Freddie "Nice-to-Meet" – Freddie is the band's manager/impresario. He tends to involve issues unrelated to the original topic of conversation, which causes confusion and agreement among those around him, and sometimes even arouses fear in the rule of his threatening speech. Freddie is one of the only personality splits Kobi has who can take over Kobi on their own. Eddie's brother.
- Naji Comradin Jackson – An elderly man of Iraqi descent with a heavy accent. He introduces himself as the chairman of the Housing Culture Association, who ostensibly came to help his neighbor Bracha Kirschenberg, but actually uses this to make her stop complaining about the noise of the band when making music. This becomes very rare since they start doing their rehearsals in Gary's basement. He also uses Ms. Bracha to eat when he is hungry, taking advantage of the fact Ms. Bracha falls in love with him. Often swears a lot with an Iraqi dialect. Along with freddie, can take over Kobe on his own.
- Marcel Fuerro (Poirot) – A policeman. Based on the fictional character Hercule Poirot. He appears when crimes occur or when investigations are needed. He is Mani's brother, and his rank is "Very Major Sergeant" (Rav samal mitkadem meod), which he tends to mention frequently. He also tends to say "Menuvelet!" (Hebrew for "contemptible", feminine form) a lot.
- Sabbaba Sali – Rabbi. A parody on the Baba Sali. Often mumbles unintelligible, confused and meaningless sentences, and at the end highlights the word "sabbaba". Sabbaba Sali tends to greet everyone around him or swear if necessary. His prayers also contain quotes from songs.
- Eddie "Good-to-See" – Freddie's gay brother. He says "Naim li" (Hebrew for "I feel comfortable", but used as "I'm pleased") as a response to someone else's "Pleased to meet you". Dancer, choreographer and producer of small productions. Began to appear in the second season, when it became necessary to invent a softened version of Freddie in order to communicate with Nathan optimally.
- Meir Einstein – A parody of sports and radio broadcaster Meir Einstein. Has a ponytail that covers his eyes, and usually walks around with a comb that also serves as a microphone. Appears as a broadcaster of low importance sports events. Started appearing in the second season. Broadcaster with an obsession to comb his hair.
- Yehoram Zuberbuler – A television broadcaster from the early days of television in Israel, speaks pure but anachronistic Hebrew and his character is presented in black and white. Yehoram appears as a news broadcaster without any news team around him. The announcer of "The Only Channel". He usually shouts his last name. Joined in the sixth season.
- Mani Pire - An excellent and talented chef and the brother of Marcel. Changed his last name from "Poirot" to "Pira". Appeared for the eighth season in which also aired an episode trilogy in which he received a show of his own. Is known for saying "lilcked it" (on the weight of "licked it"). The only personality split in the history of the series that brought Kobi to a fixed period of fame at the cost of a conflict with his friends. Shows up when Kobi is on the TV show "Mister Chef" (Master Chef parody). Becomes a superstar when the group decides to give him an online show to promote the band.
- Jora - An Iraqi Dora. A new character in season 6. Appears only in 3 episodes. She has a monkey friend names Butchak (Boots in the original series) who is played by Nathan,

== Episodes ==
| Season | Episodes | Originally released | |
| Season | Episodes | First released | Last released |
|---|---|---|---|
| 1 | 23 | July 6, 2003 | July 31, 2003 |
| 2 | 19 | March 28, 2004 | May 2, 2004 |
| 3 | 20 | July 1, 2004 | July 28, 2004 |
| 4 | 25 | August 13, 2006 | September 17, 2006 |
| 5 | 36 | September 1, 2008 | October 27, 2008 |
| 6 | 25 | September 1, 2010 | October 10, 2010 |
| 7 | 25 | September 1, 2011 | October 9, 2011 |
| 8 | 25 | May 19, 2013 | June 30, 2013 |
| 9 | 25 | January 4, 2015 | February 15, 2015 |

=== Season 1 (2003) ===
| No. overall | No. in season | Title | Directed by | Written by | Original release date |
|---|---|---|---|---|---|
| 1 | 1 | "How It All Began" | Ruby Duenyas & Yoav Tzafir | Arik Zilberman & Hen Kliman | July 6, 2003 |
| 2 | 2 | "Bread 'N' Labor" | Ruby Duenyas | Arik Zilberman & Efrat Keizman | July 7, 2003 |
| 3 | 3 | "Everybody Loves Alona" | Yoav Tzafir | Arik Zilberman & Efrat Keizman | July 8, 2003 |
| 4 | 4 | "Rockumentary" | Ruby Duenyas | Ruby Duenyas | July 9, 2003 |
| 5 | 5 | "Grocery Song" | Ruby Duenyas | Arik Zilberman & Hen Kliman | July 10, 2003 |
| 6 | 6 | "The Pocketbook" | Ruby Duenyas | Itzik Krichly & Ori Halevi | July 11, 2003 |
| 7 | 7 | "Radio Active" | Yoav Tzafir | Arik Zilberman, Hen Kliman, Efrat Keizman & Ruby Duenyas | July 13, 2003 |
| 8 | 8 | "The Real Story" | Ruby Duenyas | Ruby Duenyas & Hen Kliman | July 14, 2003 |
| 9 | 9 | "Who's The Man?" | Ruby Duenyas | Itzik Krichly & Uri Halevi | July 15, 2003 |
| 10 | 10 | "Oded Says What?" | Ruby Duenyas | Itzik Krichly & Uri Halevi | July 16, 2003 |
| 11 | 11 | "The Flipper" | Ruby Duenyas | Arik Zilberman & Efrat Keizman | July 17, 2003 |
| 12 | 12 | "Scary Story" | Ruby Duenyas | Ruby Duenyas | July 18, 2003 |
| 13 | 13 | "Ilan the Superstar Part 1" | Ruby Duenyas | Itzik Krichly & Uri Halevi | July 20, 2003 |
| 14 | 14 | "Ilan the Superstar Part 2" | Ruby Duenyas | Itzik Krichly & Uri Halevi | July 21, 2003 |
| 15 | 15 | "Being Tal Mussari" | Ruby Duenyas | Ruby Duenyas & Hen Kliman | July 22, 2003 |
| 16 | 16 | "Reverse Psychology" | Ruby Duenyas | Arik Zilberman & Hen Kliman | July 23, 2003 |
| 17 | 17 | "The Magician" | Ruby Duenyas | Arik Zilberman & Hen Kliman | July 24, 2003 |
| 18 | 18 | "24 Plus" | Ruby Duenyas | Ruby Duenyas | July 25, 2003 |
| 19 | 19 | "Zainy in the Brainy" | Ruby Duenyas | Elad Korish | July 27, 2003 |
| 20 | 20 | "The Bavli School Witch Project" | Ruby Duenyas | Hen Kliman & Elad Korish | July 28, 2003 |
| 21 | 21 | "Backstage Pass" | Ruby Duenyas | Arik Zilberman & Efrat Keizman | July 29, 2003 |
| 22 | 22 | "Pyjamas Season Finale" | Ruby Duenyas | Arik Zilberman & Hen Kliman | July 30, 2003 |
| 23 | 23 | "My Favorite Episode" | Ruby Duenyas | Ruby Duenyas | July 31, 2003 |

=== Season 2 (2004) ===
| No. overall | No. in season | Title | Directed by | Written by | Original release date |
|---|---|---|---|---|---|
| 24 | 1 | "The A-Team A" | Ruby Duenyas | Arik Zilberman & Nadav Frishman | March 28, 2004 |
| 25 | 2 | "The A-Team B" | Ruby Duenyas | Arik Zilberman & Nadav Frishman | March 29, 2004 |
| 26 | 3 | "Hilarious Birthday" | Ruby Duenyas | Oded Paz & Yuval Segal | March 30, 2004 |
| 27 | 4 | "Seance" | Ruby Duenyas | Ruby Duenyas & Eli Darai | March 31, 2004 |
| 28 | 5 | "Take Me Alona" | Ruby Duenyas | Itzik Krichly & Ori Halevi | April 1, 2004 |
| 29 | 6 | "Aliens" | Ruby Duenyas | Ruby Duenyas & Eli Darai | April 4, 2004 |
| 30 | 7 | "Net Pyjamas" | Ruby Duenyas | Hen Kliman | April 7, 2004 |
| 31 | 8 | "Observers Organization" | Ruby Duenyas | Hen Kliman | April 8, 2004 |
| 32 | 9 | "Super Roni" | Ruby Duenyas | Hen Kliman | April 11, 2004 |
| 33 | 10 | "Blind Date" | Ruby Duenyas | Ilan Rosenfeld | April 12, 2004 |
| 34 | 11 | "The Last Episode?" | Ruby Duenyas | Itzik Krichly & Uri Halevi | April 13, 2004 |
| 35 | 12 | "Japanese Movie" | Ruby Duenyas | Kobi Faraj | April 14, 2004 |
| 36 | 13 | "Gary's Tavern" | Ruby Duenyas | Ilan Rosenfeld | April 15, 2004 |
| 37 | 14 | "The Landlord A" | Ruby Duenyas | Arik Zilberman | April 20, 2004 |
| 38 | 15 | "The Landlord B" | Ruby Duenyas | Arik Zilberman | April 21, 2004 |
| 39 | 16 | "The Princess, the Thief and the Whiner" | Ruby Duenyas | Elad Korish & Yuval Segal | April 27, 2004 |
| 40 | 17 | "Pijamatron" | Ruby Duenyas | Ilan Rosenfeld & Oded Paz | April 28, 2004 |
| 41 | 18 | "M-TV(E)" | Ruby Duenyas | Ilan Rosenfeld & Kobi Faraj | April 29, 2004 |
| 42 | 19 | "The Golden Pyjama" | Ruby Duenyas | Oded Paz | May 2, 2004 |

=== Season 3 (2004) ===
| No. overall | No. in season | Title | Directed by | Written by | Original release date |
|---|---|---|---|---|---|
| 43 | 1 | "Animated Episode" | Ruby Duenyas | Arik Zilberman & Hen Kliman | July 1, 2004 |
| 44 | 2 | "Eurovision" | Ruby Duenyas | Ruby Duenyas & Eli Darai | July 4, 2004 |
| 45 | 3 | "Send Me an Angel" | Ruby Duenyas | Arik Zilberman & Hen Kliman | July 5, 2004 |
| 46 | 4 | "Brainless Pyjamas" | Ruby Duenyas | Yuval Segal | July 6, 2004 |
| 47 | 5 | "Maiumama" | Ruby Duenyas | Oded Paz | July 7, 2004 |
| 48 | 6 | "Things I Wanted to Say" | Ruby Duenyas | Ruby Duenyas & Eli Darai | July 8, 2004 |
| 49 | 7 | "The Old Radio" | Ruby Duenyas | Elad Korish | July 11, 2004 |
| 50 | 8 | "Tzimhoni vs. Mandlebaum I" | Ruby Duenyas | Elad Korish | July 12, 2004 |
| 51 | 9 | "Tzimhoni vs. Mandlebaum II" | Ruby Duenyas | Yuval Segal | July 13, 2004 |
| 52 | 10 | "Eat to Win" | Ruby Duenyas | Arik Zilberman & Hen Kliman | July 14, 2004 |
| 53 | 11 | "To Live With Him" | Ruby Duenyas | Arik Zilberman, Hen Kliman & Nitzan Cohen | July 15, 2004 |
| 54 | 12 | "Najimania" | Ruby Duenyas | Arik Zilberman & Hen Kliman | July 18, 2004 |
| 55 | 13 | "Alona Returns to Rehearsals" | Ruby Duenyas | Itzik Krichly & Ori Halevi | July 19, 2004 |
| 56 | 14 | "Lucky Gum" | Ruby Duenyas | Itzik Krichly & Uri Halevi | July 20, 2004 |
| 57 | 15 | "False Surprise" | Ruby Duenyas | Itzik Krichly & Uri Halevi | July 21, 2004 |
| 58 | 16 | "Deconstructing Gary" | Ruby Duenyas | Itzik Krichly & Uri Halevi | July 22, 2004 |
| 59 | 17 | "Before the End" | Ruby Duenyas | Arik Zilberman & Hen Kliman | July 25, 2004 |
| 60 | 18 | "The Finale" | Ruby Duenyas | Arik Zilberman & Hen Kliman | July 26, 2004 |
| 61 | 19 | "Only the truth" | Yoni Gera | Unknown | July 27, 2004 |
| 62 | 20 | "This That or This That" | Ruby Duenyas | Ruby Duenyas | July 28, 2004 |

=== Season 4 (2006) ===
| No. overall | No. in season | Title | Directed by | Written by | Original release date |
|---|---|---|---|---|---|
| 63 | 1 | "What?" | Ruby Duenyas | Ruby Duenyas & Ilan Rosenfeld | August 13, 2006 |
| 64 | 2 | "Pyjamas Code" | Ruby Duenyas | Yuval Segal & Elad Korish | August 14, 2006 |
| 65 | 3 | "Failure Contest" | Ruby Duenyas | Kobi Faraj & Oded Paz | August 15, 2006 |
| 66 | 4 | "House Inauguration" | Ruby Duenyas | Ilan Rosenfeld & Oded Paz | August 16, 2006 |
| 67 | 5 | "Freddie Morning" | Ruby Duenyas | Ruby Duenyas & Eli Darai | August 17, 2006 |
| 68 | 6 | "The Next Generation" | Ruby Duenyas | Ruby Duenyas & Eli Darai | August 20, 2006 |
| 69 | 7 | "Yes, No, Black, White" | Ruby Duenyas | Ruby Duenyas & Yuval Segal | August 21, 2006 |
| 70 | 8 | "A Rat!" | Ruby Duenyas | Ruby Duenyas & Yuval Segal | August 22, 2006 |
| 71 | 9 | "FC Mendelbaum" | Ruby Duenyas | Ilan Rosenfeld & Kobi Faraj | August 23, 2006 |
| 72 | 10 | "Lock, Stock and Two Washing Machines" | Ruby Duenyas | Ilan Rosenfeld & Kobi Faraj | August 24, 2006 |
| 73 | 11 | "The Extra and the Others" | Ruby Duenyas | Ruby Duenyas & Eli Darai | August 27, 2006 |
| 74 | 12 | "Little Burger Shop of Horrors" | Ruby Duenyas | Yuval Segal & Kobi Faraj | August 28, 2006 |
| 75 | 13 | "Original Song" | Ruby Duenyas | Ruby Duenyas & Eli Darai | August 30, 2006 |
| 76 | 14 | "Underwear" | Ruby Duenyas | Ilan Rosenfeld & Yuval Segal | August 31, 2006 |
| 77 | 15 | "Tzimhoni vs. Mandlebaum III" | Ruby Duenyas | Ruby Duenyas & Eli Darai | September 3, 2006 |
| 78 | 16 | "Code Name Moustache" | Ruby Duenyas | Yuval Segal & Elad Korish | September 4, 2006 |
| 79 | 17 | "Survival" | Ruby Duenyas | Ruby Duenyas & Yaniv Polishuk | September 5, 2006 |
| 80 | 18 | "Ringtone" | Ruby Duenyas | Ruby Duenyas & Eli Darai | September 6, 2006 |
| 81 | 19 | "Restart Life" | Ruby Duenyas | Oded Paz & Ilan Rosenfeld | September 7, 2006 |
| 82 | 20 | "Snokar Tournament" | Ruby Duenyas | Yaniv Polishuk | September 10, 2006 |
| 83 | 21 | "The Revenge of the Egyptian Crosseyed Woman" | Ruby Duenyas | Ruby Duenyas, Kobi Faraj & Elad Korish | September 11, 2006 |
| 84 | 22 | "The Opposite is True" | Ruby Duenyas | Oded Paz & Ilan Rosenfeld | September 12, 2006 |
| 85 | 23 | "The Bejeranos" | Ruby Duenyas | Ruby Duenyas, Kobi Faraj & Elad Korish | September 13, 2006 |
| 86 | 24 | "Spaceships" | Ruby Duenyas | Ruby Duenyas & Eli Darai | September 14, 2006 |
| 87 | 25 | "End of Season Liquidation Sale" | Ruby Duenyas | Ruby Duenyas & Ilan Rosenfeld | September 17, 2006 |

=== Season 5 (2008) ===
| No. overall | No. in season | Title | Directed by | Written by | Original release date |
|---|---|---|---|---|---|
| 88 | 1 | "The Pyjamas Comeback" | Ruby Duenyas | Ruby Duenyas & Ilan Rosenfeld | September 1, 2008 |
| 89 | 2 | "Episode with Potential" | Ruby Duenyas | Ruby Duenyas & Eli Darai | September 2, 2008 |
| 90 | 3 | "Episode 3 Season 5 Classic" | Ruby Duenyas | Ruby Duenyas & Yaniv Polishuk | September 3, 2008 |
| 91 | 4 | "The Unavailable Dana" | Ruby Duenyas | Ruby Duenyas & Eli Darai | September 4, 2008 |
| 92 | 5 | "The Wrong Butterfly" | Ruby Duenyas | Ruby Duenyas & Eli Darai | September 7, 2008 |
| 93 | 6 | "Ring Searching" | Ruby Duenyas | Ruby Duenyas | September 8, 2008 |
| 94 | 7 | "Disorientation" | Ruby Duenyas | Ruby Duenyas | September 9, 2008 |
| 95 | 8 | "Bridge" | Ruby Duenyas | Ruby Duenyas & Yaniv Polishuk | September 10, 2008 |
| 96 | 9 | "Tzimhoni vs. Mandlebaum IV" | Ruby Duenyas | Ruby Duenyas | September 11, 2008 |
| 97 | 10 | "Free Gifts" | Ruby Duenyas | Yoni Gera & Elad Korish | September 14, 2008 |
| 98 | 11 | "The French A" | Ruby Duenyas | Ruby Duenyas & Yaniv Polishuk | September 15, 2008 |
| 99 | 12 | "The French B" | Ruby Duenyas | Ruby Duenyas & Yaniv Polishuk | September 16, 2008 |
| 100 | 13 | "The 100th Episode" | Ruby Duenyas | Ruby Duenyas & Ilan Rosenfeld | September 17, 2008 |
| 101 | 14 | "Vocal Pedagogy" | Ruby Duenyas | Oded Paz | September 18, 2008 |
| 102 | 15 | "The Flood" | Ruby Duenyas | Yuval Segal | September 21, 2008 |
| 103 | 16 | "Kosher Episode" | Ruby Duenyas | Ruby Duenyas & Eli Darai | September 22, 2008 |
| 104 | 17 | "Thus Spoke Zarathustra" | Ruby Duenyas | Ruby Duenyas | September 23, 2008 |
| 105 | 18 | "Daddy" | Ruby Duenyas | Yuval Segal | September 24, 2008 |
| 106 | 19 | "Pic Pic Pook" | Ruby Duenyas | Ruby Duenyas | September 25, 2008 |
| 107 | 20 | "The Tamaguchi Mystery" | Ruby Duenyas | Ruby Duenyas & Yaniv Polishuk | September 28, 2008 |
| 108 | 21 | "Stinky Episode" | Ruby Duenyas | Ruby Duenyas | September 29, 2008 |
| 109 | 22 | "Trans" | Ruby Duenyas | Ruby Duenyas & Eli Darai | October 2, 2008 |
| 110 | 23 | "Filthy Rich" | Ruby Duenyas | Elad Korish & Kobi Faraj | October 5, 2008 |
| 111 | 24 | "The End of the World" | Ruby Duenyas | Yaniv Polishuk & Oded Paz | October 6, 2008 |
| 112 | 25 | "Super Heros?" | Ruby Duenyas | Ruby Duenyas & Yaniv Polishuk | October 7, 2008 |
| 113 | 26 | "Gary's Brother" | Ruby Duenyas | Elad Korish & Kobi Faraj | October 12, 2008 |
| 114 | 27 | "Celebreke" | Ruby Duenyas | Oded Paz & Yoni Gera | October 13, 2008 |
| 115 | 28 | "Three Stories" | Ruby Duenyas | Ori Rozenberg, Ziv Hermelin & Shmulik Hugi | October 15, 2008 |
| 116 | 29 | "Zero Zero Zero" | Ruby Duenyas | Ruby Duenyas & Eli Darai | October 16, 2008 |
| 117 | 30 | "All The Truth" | Ruby Duenyas | Ruby Duenyas & Eti Hasson | October 17, 2008 |
| 118 | 31 | "Desert Story" | Ruby Duenyas | Ruby Duenyas & Yaniv Polishuk | October 19, 2008 |
| 119 | 32 | "Cancer" | Ruby Duenyas | Ruby Duenyas & Eti Hasson | October 20, 2008 |
| 120 | 33 | "It's All About Business" | Ruby Duenyas | Yoni Gera & Elad Korish | October 22, 2008 |
| 121 | 34 | "Help!" | Ruby Duenyas | Ilan Rosenfeld & Yoni Gera | October 23, 2008 |
| 122 | 35 | "Silver Wedding Anniversary" | Ruby Duenyas | Ruby Duenyas & Yaniv Polishuk | October 26, 2008 |
| 123 | 36 | "Boring Finale" | Ruby Duenyas | Ruby Duenyas & Ilan Rosenfeld | October 27, 2008 |

=== Season 6 (2010) ===
| No. overall | No. in season | Title | Directed by | Written by | Original release date |
|---|---|---|---|---|---|
| 124 | 1 | "Malka Kuperman" | Ruby Duenyas | Ruby Duenyas & Yamit Sol | September 1, 2010 |
| 125 | 2 | "Between the Seasons" | Ruby Duenyas | Ruby Duenyas & Eli Darai | September 2, 2010 |
| 126 | 3 | "Episode 3 Season 6 Classic" | Ruby Duenyas | Ruby Duenyas | September 5, 2010 |
| 127 | 4 | "Chess" | Ruby Duenyas | Ruby Duenyas & Eli Darai | September 6, 2010 |
| 128 | 5 | "Eddie Polishuk" | Ruby Duenyas | Ruby Duenyas & Eli Darai | September 7, 2010 |
| 129 | 6 | "Jina" | Ruby Duenyas | Ruby Duenyas | September 8, 2010 |
| 130 | 7 | "Smart World" | Ruby Duenyas | Ruby Duenyas & Yamit Sol | September 12, 2010 |
| 131 | 8 | "Do Me a Favor" | Ruby Duenyas | Yuval Segal | September 13, 2010 |
| 132 | 9 | "Ping" | Ruby Duenyas | Ruby Duenyas & Eli Darai | September 14, 2010 |
| 133 | 10 | "April Fool's Day" | Ruby Duenyas | Ruby Duenyas & Eli Darai | September 15, 2010 |
| 134 | 11 | "Tzimhoni vs. Mandlebaum VI" | Ruby Duenyas | Ruby Duenyas | September 16, 2010 |
| 135 | 12 | "Japanese Legend" | Ruby Duenyas | Ruby Duenyas & Eli Darai | September 19, 2010 |
| 136 | 13 | "The World of the Ants" | Ruby Duenyas | Ruby Duenyas & Eli Darai | September 20, 2010 |
| 137 | 14 | "The Art of Seduction" | Ruby Duenyas | Ruby Duenyas & Yamit Sol | September 21, 2010 |
| 138 | 15 | "Jora" | Ruby Duenyas | Ruby Duenyas & Eli Darai | September 22, 2010 |
| 139 | 16 | "Wolman" | Ruby Duenyas | Oded Paz & Yuval Segal | September 26, 2010 |
| 140 | 17 | "Supernatural A" | Ruby Duenyas | Ruby Duenyas & Eli Darai | September 27, 2010 |
| 141 | 18 | "Supernatural B" | Ruby Duenyas | Ruby Duenyas & Eli Darai | September 28, 2010 |
| 142 | 19 | "Frustrated and Nervous" | Ruby Duenyas | Yuval Segal | September 29, 2010 |
| 143 | 20 | "X" | Ruby Duenyas | Yuval Segal | October 3, 2010 |
| 144 | 21 | "Virtual World" | Ruby Duenyas | Ruby Duenyas & Eli Darai | October 4, 2010 |
| 145 | 22 | "XO" | Ruby Duenyas | Ruby Duenyas & Eli Darai | October 5, 2010 |
| 146 | 23 | "Astrology" | Ruby Duenyas | Yuval Segal | October 6, 2010 |
| 147 | 24 | "Penultimate Episode" | Ruby Duenyas | Ruby Duenyas & Eli Darai | October 7, 2010 |
| 148 | 25 | "After the Penultimate Episode" | Ruby Duenyas | Ruby Duenyas | October 10, 2010 |

=== Season 7 (2011) ===
| No. overall | No. in season | Title | Directed by | Written by | Original release date |
|---|---|---|---|---|---|
| 149 | 1 | "Ilan and the Hamburgers Factory" | Ruby Duenyas | Yuval Segal | September 1, 2011 |
| 150 | 2 | "Yalla Productions" | Ruby Duenyas | Elad Korish & Kobi Faraj | September 4, 2011 |
| 151 | 3 | "Obama's Coming" | Ruby Duenyas | Ruby Duenyas & Eli Darai | September 5, 2011 |
| 152 | 4 | "The Shortest Episode Ever" | Ruby Duenyas | Ruby Duenyas | September 6, 2011 |
| 153 | 5 | "Fired!" | Ruby Duenyas | Ruby Duenyas & Eli Darai | September 7, 2011 |
| 154 | 6 | "Yamit's Sister" | Ruby Duenyas | Ruby Duenyas & Yamit Sol | September 8, 2011 |
| 155 | 7 | "Who Stole the Cookies?" | Ruby Duenyas | Ruby Duenyas & Eli Darai | September 11, 2011 |
| 156 | 8 | "Tzimhoni- This is Your Life" | Ruby Duenyas | Ruby Duenyas | September 12, 2011 |
| 157 | 9 | "3333" | Ruby Duenyas | Ruby Duenyas & Eli Darai | September 13, 2011 |
| 158 | 10 | "Hitchcock" | Ruby Duenyas | Yuval Segal | September 14, 2011 |
| 159 | 11 | "Good News" | Ruby Duenyas | Elad Korish & Kobi Faraj | September 15, 2011 |
| 160 | 12 | "Humor" | Ruby Duenyas | Ruby Duenyas & Yaniv Polishuk | September 18, 2011 |
| 161 | 13 | "Flash" | Ruby Duenyas | Ruby Duenyas & Eli Darai | September 19, 2011 |
| 162 | 14 | "The Dream and the Break" | Ruby Duenyas | Ruby Duenyas & Eli Darai | September 20, 2011 |
| 163 | 15 | "Filmed Episode" | Ruby Duenyas | Ruby Duenyas & Hen Kliman | September 21, 2011 |
| 164 | 16 | "Secrets of Silence" | Ruby Duenyas | Yuval Segal | September 22, 2011 |
| 165 | 17 | "Ocean" | Ruby Duenyas | Yuval Segal | September 25, 2011 |
| 166 | 18 | "Bloopers" | Ruby Duenyas | Ruby Duenyas | September 26, 2011 |
| 167 | 19 | "Sababa Hasidic" | Ruby Duenyas | Ruby Duenyas & Eli Darai | September 27, 2011 |
| 168 | 20 | "20,000$" | Ruby Duenyas | Ruby Duenyas & Eli Darai | October 2, 2011 |
| 169 | 21 | "Role" | Ruby Duenyas | Ruby Duenyas & Dana Frider | October 3, 2011 |
| 170 | 22 | "Jargon" | Ruby Duenyas | Elad Korish & Kobi Faraj | October 4, 2011 |
| 171 | 23 | "Momentary Sanity" | Ruby Duenyas | Ruby Duenyas & Yamit Sol | October 5, 2011 |
| 172 | 24 | "Last Effort" | Ruby Duenyas | Yuval Segal | October 6, 2011 |
| 173 | 25 | "The Last and Enough" | Ruby Duenyas | Ruby Duenyas & Eli Darai | October 9, 2011 |

=== Season 8 (2013) ===
| No. overall | No. in season | Title | Directed by | Written by | Original release date |
|---|---|---|---|---|---|
| 174 | 1 | "When Natan Met Dana" | Ruby Duenyas | Ruby Duenyas & Yamit Sol | May 19, 2013 |
| 175 | 2 | "Mr. Chef" | Ruby Duenyas | Ruby Duenyas & Eli Darai | May 20, 2013 |
| 176 | 3 | "Episode 3 Season 8 Classic" | Ruby Duenyas | Ruby Duenyas & Eli Darai | May 21, 2013 |
| 177 | 4 | "iPijamot" | Ruby Duenyas | Ruby Duenyas | May 22, 2013 |
| 178 | 5 | "The Hairy Rose of Baghdad" | Ruby Duenyas | Ruby Duenyas & Eli Darai | May 26, 2013 |
| 179 | 6 | "Bread Roll 'N' Job" | Ruby Duenyas | Ruby Duenyas & Yaniv Polishuk | May 27, 2013 |
| 180 | 7 | "Hidden" | Ruby Duenyas | Ilan Rosenfeld & Kobi Faraj | May 28, 2013 |
| 181 | 8 | "Special Episode" | Ruby Duenyas | Ruby Duenyas | May 29, 2013 |
| 182 | 9 | "Imagine" | Ruby Duenyas | Yuval Segal | June 2, 2013 |
| 183 | 10 | "You Tube" | Ruby Duenyas | Ruby Duenyas & Eli Darai | June 3, 2013 |
| 184 | 11 | "You Also Tube" | Ruby Duenyas | Ruby Duenyas & Eli Darai | June 4, 2013 |
| 185 | 12 | "You Not Tube" | Ruby Duenyas | Ruby Duenyas & Eli Darai | June 5, 2013 |
| 186 | 13 | "Miniature Spaceship" | Ruby Duenyas | Yuval Segal | June 9, 2013 |
| 187 | 14 | "Surprise" | Ruby Duenyas | Ruby Duenyas & Eli Darai | June 10, 2013 |
| 188 | 15 | "Speak Hebrew" | Ruby Duenyas | Ruby Duenyas | June 11, 2013 |
| 189 | 16 | "The Artists" | Ruby Duenyas | Ruby Duenyas & Eli Darai | June 12, 2013 |
| 190 | 17 | "Fly Away Chick" | Ruby Duenyas | Ruby Duenyas & Yamit Sol | June 16, 2013 |
| 191 | 18 | "The Wonderful Group" | Ruby Duenyas | Ruby Duenyas & Eli Darai | June 17, 2013 |
| 192 | 19 | "Role-playing Games" | Ruby Duenyas | Ruby Duenyas, Yamit Sol & Dana Frider | June 18, 2013 |
| 193 | 20 | "Enthusiasm" | Ruby Duenyas | Ilan Rosenfeld & Oded Paz | June 19, 2013 |
| 194 | 21 | "Elevators" | Ruby Duenyas | Ruby Duenyas & Eli Darai | June 23, 2013 |
| 195 | 22 | "Doctor, Doctor/Ilan's Anatomy A" | Ruby Duenyas | Ruby Duenyas & Yamit Sol | June 24, 2013 |
| 196 | 23 | "Ilan's Anatomy B" | Ruby Duenyas | Ruby Duenyas & Yamit Sol | June 25, 2013 |
| 197 | 24 | "Social "Patz Patz"" | Ruby Duenyas | Ruby Duenyas & Eli Darai | June 26, 2013 |
| 198 | 25 | "The Hangover: Hamburgary" | Ruby Duenyas | Ruby Duenyas & Yamit Sol | June 30, 2013 |

=== Season 9 (2015) ===
| No. overall | No. in season | Title | Directed by | Written by | Original release date |
|---|---|---|---|---|---|
| 199 | 1 | "American Episode" | Ruby Duenyas | Ruby Duenyas & Kobi Faraj | January 4, 2015 |
| 200 | 2 | "The Episode Where Shifra's Coming" | Ruby Duenyas | Kobi Faraj & Ilan Rosenfeld | January 5, 2015 |
| 201 | 3 | "The Wonderful Wizard of Oz" | Ruby Duenyas | Ruby Duenyas & Eli Darai | January 6, 2015 |
| 202 | 4 | "The Big Blackout" | Ruby Duenyas | Ruby Duenyas & Yamit Sol | January 7, 2015 |
| 203 | 5 | "Tzimhoni vs. Mandlebaum IX" | Ruby Duenyas | Ruby Duenyas & Eli Darai | January 11, 2015 |
| 204 | 6 | "Pipeline Radio" | Ruby Duenyas | Ruby Duenyas & Eli Darai | January 12, 2015 |
| 205 | 7 | "The History of Art" | Ruby Duenyas | Ruby Duenyas & Eli Darai | January 13, 2015 |
| 206 | 8 | "The List" | Ruby Duenyas | Yuval Segal | January 14, 2015 |
| 207 | 9 | "Cover" | Ruby Duenyas | Ruby Duenyas & Eli Darai | January 18, 2015 |
| 208 | 10 | "Avalanche" | Ruby Duenyas | Ruby Duenyas & Yamit Sol | January 19, 2015 |
| 209 | 11 | "The Cell" | Ruby Duenyas | Ruby Duenyas & Eli Darai | January 20, 2015 |
| 210 | 12 | "It's Not Unfounded" | Ruby Duenyas | Ilan Rosenfeld & Yuval Segal | January 21, 2015 |
| 211 | 13 | "Achinoam's Advice" | Ruby Duenyas | Ruby Duenyas & Yamit Sol | January 25, 2015 |
| 212 | 14 | "Najijuice" | Ruby Duenyas | Ilan Rosenfeld & Oded Paz | January 26, 2015 |
| 213 | 15 | "The Rise and Fall of Mani Pire" | Ruby Duenyas | Ruby Duenyas & Eli Darai | January 27, 2015 |
| 214 | 16 | "Hamburgeroni" | Ruby Duenyas | Ruby Duenyas & Yaniv Polishook | January 28, 2015 |
| 215 | 17 | "Jora Strikes Back" | Ruby Duenyas | Ruby Duenyas & Eli Darai | February 1, 2015 |
| 216 | 18 | "Jerusalem Syndrome" | Ruby Duenyas | Ruby Duenyas & Yamit Sol | February 2, 2015 |
| 217 | 19 | "Sh'nekel" | Ruby Duenyas | Ruby Duenyas & Eli Darai | February 3, 2015 |
| 218 | 20 | "Um-Lala" | Ruby Duenyas | Ruby Duenyas & Eli Darai | February 4, 2015 |
| 219 | 21 | "Bloopers 2" | Ruby Duenyas | Ruby Duenyas | February 8, 2015 |
| 220 | 22 | "Muses" | Ruby Duenyas | Ruby Duenyas & Yamit Sol | February 9, 2015 |
| 221 | 23 | "Pipeline Radio - The Movie" | Ruby Duenyas | Ruby Duenyas & Eli Darai | February 10, 2015 |
| 222 | 24 | "The Prompter" | Ruby Duenyas | Oded Paz & Yuval Segal | February 11, 2015 |
| 223 | 25 | "Will You Marry Me?" | Ruby Duenyas | Oded Paz & Yuval Segal | February 15, 2015 |
