= Karaoke (2022 film) =

- Theatrical release poster
- Directed by: Moshe Rosenthal
- Written by: Moshe Rosenthal
- Produced by: Efrat Cohen
- Starring: Sasson Gabai; Rita Shukron; Lior Ashkenazi
- Cinematography: Daniel Miller
- Edited by: Dafi Farbman
- Music by: Gal Lev; Lior Perla
- Production companies: Liminal Content; Israel Film Fund; The Steve Tisch Foundation for First Features
- Distributed by: Greenwich Entertainment; Lev Cinemas; Charades Films
- Release dates: June 10, 2022 (Tribeca); September 29, 2022 (Israel)
- Running time: 100 minutes
- Country: Israel
- Language: Hebrew

Karaoke (Hebrew: קריוקי) is a 2022 Israeli comedy-drama film written and directed by Moshe Rosenthal in his directorial debut. Starring Sasson Gabai, Rita Shukron and Lior Ashkenazi accompanied by Aryeh Cherner, Kobi Faraj, Alma Dishi and Timur Cohen.

== Synopsis ==
Meir and Tova, a middle-aged couple, live in one of the towers in a new neighborhood in Holon. They feel stuck in a sleepy rut and that they are wasting their lives. When Itzik, a modeling agent from Miami, shows up in their lives, everything suddenly changes.

== Cast ==
The actors participating in this film are:

- Sasson Gabai as Meir
- Rita Shukron as Tova
- Lior Ashkenazi as Itzik
- Aryeh Cherner
- Kobi Faraj
- Alma Dishi
- Timur Cohen

== Release ==
Karaoke had its world premiere on June 10, 2022, at the Tribeca Festival. It was released commercially on September 29, 2022, in Israeli theaters.

== Reception ==
=== Critical reception ===
On the review aggregator website Rotten Tomatoes, 91% of 14 critics' reviews are positive, with an average rating of 8.3/10.

=== Accolades ===
Year	Award / Festival	Category	Recipient	Result	Ref.
2022	Tribeca Festival	Best Narrative Feature Film - International	Karaoke	Nominated	
2022	Jerusalem Film Festival	Best Israeli Feature Film	Karaoke	Nominated	
2022	Jerusalem Film Festival	Best First Feature Film	Karaoke	Won	
2022	Jerusalem Film Festival	Audience Award	Karaoke	Won	
2022	Ophir Award	Best Picture	Karaoke	Nominated	
2022	Ophir Award	Best Director	Moshe Rosenthal	Nominated	
2022	Ophir Award	Best Actor	Sasson Gabai	Won	
2022	Ophir Award	Best Actress	Rita Shukron	Won	
2022	Ophir Award	Best Supporting Actor	Lior Ashkenazi	Nominated	
2022	Ophir Award	Best Cast	Hamotel Zrem-Kastel	Nominated	
2022	Ophir Award	Best Screenplay	Moshe Rosenthal	Nominated	
2022	Ophir Award	Best Cinematography	Daniel Miller	Nominated	
2022	Ophir Award	Best Original Music	Gal Lev & Lior Perla	Won	
2022	Ophir Award	Best Soundtrack	Vitali Greenspan & Avi Mizrahi	Won	
2022	Ophir Award	Best Editing	Defi Perbman	Nominated	
2022	Ophir Award	Best Art Design	Ado Dolev	Nominated	
2022	Ophir Award	Best Costume Design	Yam Brusilovsky	Nominated	
2022	Ophir Award	Best Makeup	Ingrid Siebert	Nominated	
2022	Raindance Film Festival	Best Director	Moshe Rosenthal	Won	
2022	Raindance Film Festival	Best Screenplay	Moshe Rosenthal	Won	
2022	Virginia Film Festival	Programmers Awards - Narrative Feature Film	Karaoke	Won	
