= Black Space =

- בלקספייס
- Directed by: Ofir Lobel
- Starring: Guri Alfi; Reut Alush; Liana Ayoun; Yoav Rotman; Yehonatan Vilozny; Gily Itskovitch; Noam Carmeli; Shai Avivi; Naya Bienstock; Ido Tako; Omer Nudelman; Sean Amsalem; Amit Hechter; Moris Cohen
- Country of origin: Israel
- Original language: Hebrew
- No. of seasons: 2
- No. of episodes: 16

Original release
- Network: Netflix
- Release: May 2021 – December 2024

Black Space (Hebrew: בלקספייס) is an Israeli TV series, directed by Ofir Lobel. The show's first season started airing in Israel on December 13, 2020, and the second season on June 10, 2024. The first season aired on Netflix globally in May 2021 and the second season aired on Netflix in December 2024.

== Premise ==
=== Season 1 ===
At a local Israeli highschool called "Moreshet Rabin" in Rishon LeZion, during the memorial day service, armed people wearing a unicorn mask and blue overalls enetered the school and started shooting, 4 students were killed. At first, the Israeli suspected the shooting was a terrorist attack, but detective Rami Davidi (Guri Alfi) does not agree, and he managed to prove that the 4 shooters were students. The police tries to find out which students committed the murders, while they find a secret messaging app, "Black Space", that every student of the highschool used.

=== Season 2 ===
The second season takes place 2 1/2 years after the end of season one. This season's story is about Neta Zahavi (Naya Bienstock), a senior in highschool. Neta was raped during prom by 5 other students, but at first she only remembers being raped by one of them. At first, the police tries to find the rapists, but as more of them turn up dead, the investigation turns into a murder case. This season follows the murders and the police trying to find who's responsible.

== Cast ==
=== Both seasons ===
- Guri Alfi as Rami Davidi, a detective in the special investigations division. Miri's husband and Mika's dad. He studied at "Moreshet Rabin" highschool as a teenager, and he experienced bullying during his time there, which caused him having eye surgery and having an eye made of glass. During season 2 he and Miri got divorced.
- Reut Alush as Morag Shmuel, a police officer that typically deals with cases involving minors. Rami doesn't like her being on the case. In season 2, she's demoted and moved to a different station after the events that occurred at the end of the first season.
- Meirav Shirom as Miri Davidi, Rami's wife and Mika's mom. During the first season she's pregnant with Mika. She and Rami divorce in season 2 after he found out she cheated on him.

=== Season 1 ===
==== Students ====
- Liana Ayoun as Libi Broyda, a popular student. She's close friends with Itamar. Tom and her were a couple until they broke up 2 years before the beginning of season 1. She currently lives alone, as her parents are on a Safari trip in Kenya. It was revealed that she filmed the bullying video of Ido, and that's she is one of the killers. She manages to escape from the police at the end of season 1.
- Yoav Rotman as Itamar, an average student. Libi's good friend, Itamar is secretly in love with Libi. Works at the local pizzeria along with his friend Guy. Abused by his father which leads to him sleeping in the pizzeria a lot so he wouldn't have to go home. It is revealed that he is one of the killers, is arrested by Rami after the second shooting.
- Yehonatan Vilozny as Tom Tadmor, a popular student and Shir's twin brother. On the school's swim team. Friends with Ligal and Yaheli. Libi's ex-boyfriend. He used to abuse Ido and record it. Allegedly, he was supposed to be murdered in the initial shooting, but he survived. He has anxiety because of the shooting, which causes him to take pills. Tom gets murdered by Eran.
- Gily Itskovitch as Shir Tadmor, a popular student and Tom's twin sister. Friends with Ligal and Yaheli. Was friend's with Meirav who was murdered during the shooting. Supplies her brother Tom with anti-anxiety medication. She sleeps with Omer so he'll delete the video that shows her brother bullying Ido. After he brother dies, she starts to avenge the people she thinks killed him
- Ori Biton as Guy Levi, Itamar's friend, the two work together at the pizzeria. A good friend of Natalie.
- Suzana Papiyan as Natalie Stein, a student who jumped of a second story window in order to escape the shooting and got badly injured. A good friend's of Guy's
- Eyal Shikartzi as Sha'ul Bareket, the school's weirdo. He does drugs. He's good friend's with Ma'ayan and Reef. He was arrested as a suspect for the shooting, but was later released.
- Jade Hadas Skuri as Ma'ayan, a punk lover. She's good friend's with Reef and Sha'ul. Has panic attacks. Reef's ex-girlfriend, she broke up with him after she found out he cheated on her. She was suspected for the shooting, and was kidnapped by Shir and her friends at the end of season 1.
- Lev Levin as Reef, a good friend od Ma'ayan and Sha'ul. Ma'ayan's ex, she broke up with him after the found out he cheated. Was arrested as a suspect of the shooting, but later released. Tom and his friends beat him up and cut off his hair after his release, believing he was still guilty.
- Noam Carmeli as Eran Sagi, the mayor's son. Is injured in the initial shooting. He's gay, Ido's ex-boyfriend. It was revealed that he was one of the shooters. At the end of the season he confessed his crimes to the police and committed suicide.
- Oneg Efron as Omer Rokah, an unpopular student. Smart. Supplies his friends with drugs and medication without perscription, specifically to Tom through his twin sister, Shir. He showed Rami the video of Ido's bullying to not get charged on the drugs charges.
- Aviv Buchler as Ligal, a popular student. She's friends with Shir, Tom and Yaheli.
- Li'oz Harush as Yaheli, a popular student. He's friends with Shir, Tom and Ligal.
- Nir Hasdai as Zohar Or, a religious student. Was involved in Natalie's injury which led to Guy assaulting him.
- Dor Oron, a student, died during the first shooting. It was later revealed that he was one of the shooters and that the other three killed him after the act because he was regretful.
- Roy Raviv as Ido Lev, a student who committed suicide 2 years before the beginning of season 1. Was Eran's boyfriend. He took his own life because of the constant bullying he had experienced. All the students who were murdered in the shootings were the ones who bullied him.

==== Police ====
- Asi Levi as Noga Russo, in charge of the special investigations division.
- Itamar Malul as Chino, a police officer who deals with computers and cyber, discovers the app "Black Space"

==== School staff ====
- Shai Avivi as Hanoch Tavor, the principal of "Moreshet Rabin" for the last 25 years. He used to be the vice principal when Rami went to the school. Is known to ignore bullying happening at his school and covering it up.
- Shantal Cohen as Osnat, the school's vice principal, she's been working at the school for about seven years.

==== Parents ====
- Hadas Calderon as Michal Oron, Dor's mother. She attempted suicide after her son's death.
- Moshik Bar Cohen as Michah Sagi, Eran's father. The mayor.
- Eyal Nachmias as Bo'az Lev, Ido's father.
- Yuval Berger as Doron, Itamar's abusive father.

=== Season 2 ===
==== The Teenagers ====
- Naya Bienstock as Neta Zahavi, a highschool graduate. Her parents are divorced, Neta lived with her mom until she died, then Neta went to live with her dad. At the beginning of the season she was raped during prom by a guy named Dekel, she reported it to the police who started investigating, but when Dekel was found dead, Neta became a suspect at his murder. It is later revealed that at the night of the prom she was raped only by Dekel but by 4 additional teens from her class. She tries to commit suicide but Morag saves her.
- Ido Tako as Rafael "Rafa" Livne, Neta's friend and neighbour. Works at a gas station. He's a suspect of the murders.
- Omer Nudelman as Danielle, Ben's girlfriend, their relationship is toxic and manipulative. At the end of the season she realizes she was manipulated by ben.
- Eli Huli as Yarin Givon, a singer, has a famous Instagram account. It is later revealed he was one of the men who raped Neta. He got run over by a car but survived.
- Din Gerber as Dekel Uzan, one of Neta's rapists, get's murdered after the rape. A unicorn was drawn on his dead body. It is revealed that he was accidentally killed by Zoe, who was trying to protect Neta.
- Noa Astanjelove as Meitar, Danielle's good friend, she's also friends with the boys who are suspected of rape. It is later revealed that she was the target the night Yarin was run over, and that the killer mistook him for her.
- Tom Amsalem as Osher Kogen, Neta's ex-boyfriend. He's about to enlist in the IDF. The night before his enlistment his friends throw a party for him at the beach. At the way to the party, Osher get's murdered at his car with a unicorn drawn on his dead body.
- Nicole Podvalni as Zoe, Neta's best friend. She accidentally killed Dekel while trying to protect Neta.
- Sean Amsalem as Ben Segal, the "leader" of the group of boys that raped Neta. Danielle's toxic boyfriend. He gets kidnapped, but it's later revealed that the kidnapping was faked by his father who was trying to smuggle him to Cyprus so Ben would escape charges. Ben is arrested at the end of the season.
- Amit Hechter as Alon Haas, good friend's with Osher, he's the one who found his body on the beach. Suspect Zoe that she was sent by Neta to kill him as revenge for the rape. Raped Neta along with Dekel, Yarin and Ben.

==== The Police ====
- Ina Beckelman as Lina, a detective in the cyber division.
- Perla Danoh as Eden, a police officer in the station Morag works at.
- Nati Ravitz as Avi Shabat, the person in charge of the special investigations division, Rami's boss.

==== The Parents ====
- Moris Cohen as Lior Zahavi, Neta's father. A taxi driver.
- Yoram Toledano as Kobi Segal, Ben's father. The owner of the club where Neta's rape took place. It is later revealed that he murdered the boys to protect his son. Lilah's husband.
- Nili Tsruya as Lilah Segal, Ben's mother and Kobi's wife.

==== Other ====
- Mika Davidi, Miri's and Rami's daughter.
- Sharon Shterk as Dina, a therapist, good friend's with Morag.

== Production ==
The first season was filmed from July to December 2019. It was mainly filmed at the city the season takes place at, Rishon LeZion. The budget for season 1 was about 800 thousand shekels (about 200 thousand dollars).

On January 17, 2021, the show was renewed for season 2, before the first season finished airing. On April 22, 2021, it was revealed that the show was sold to Netflix.
