= Ido Tako =

Israeli actor (born 2000)

- עידו טאקו
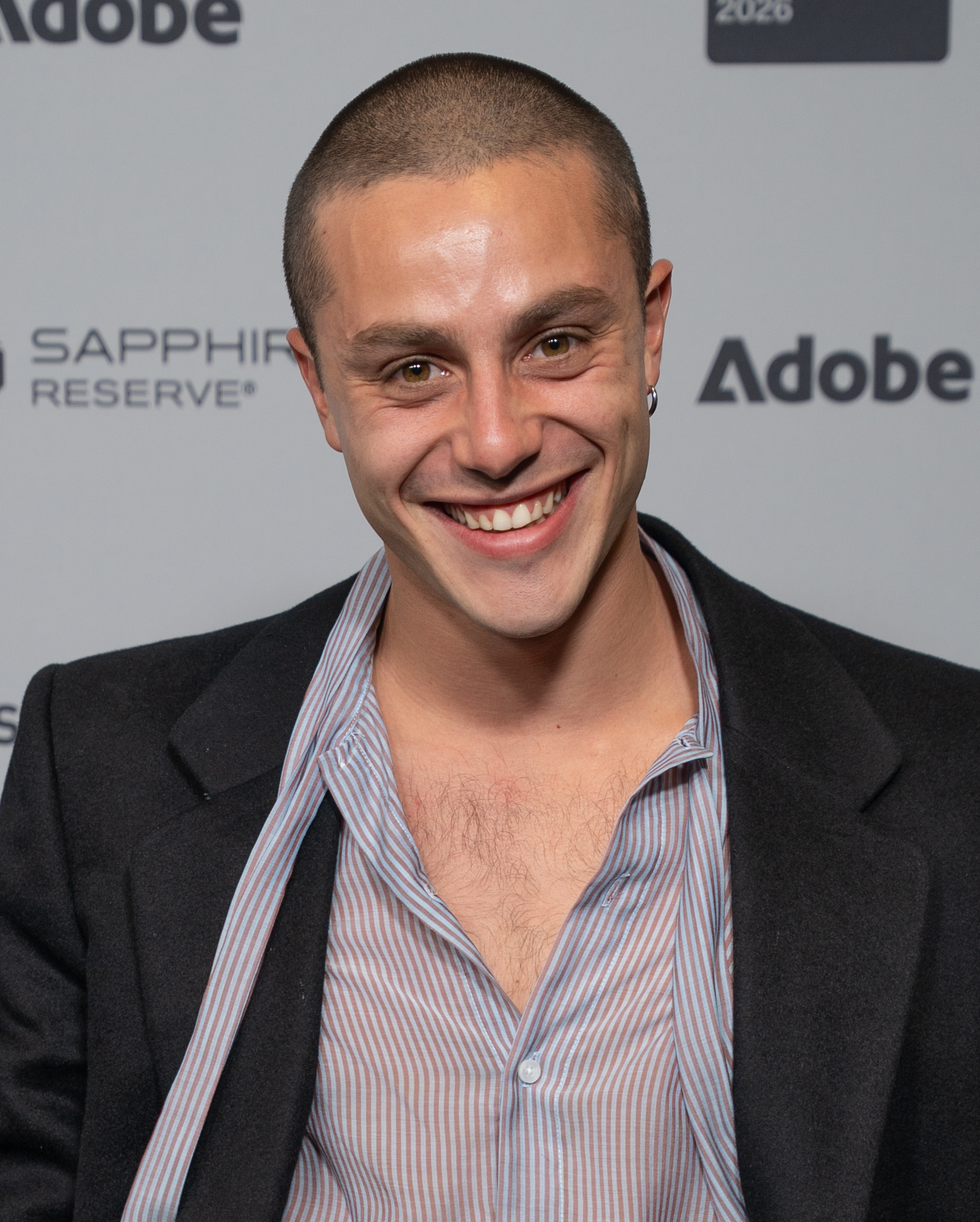
- Tako in 2026
- Born: 4 November 2000 (age 25); Hadar Yosef, Tel Aviv, Israel
- Occupation: Actor
- Years active: 2020–present

Ido Tako (Hebrew: עידו טאקו; born 4 November 2000) is an Israeli actor. He is known for starring in the 2023 Israeli war drama film The Vanishing Soldier, in the 2024 American epic biblical film Mary and in the 2026 Israeli film tell me everything.

== Early life ==
Tako grew up in Hadar Yosef, Tel Aviv, the oldest of five siblings. He is Jewish; his mother's family were Holocaust survivors from Poland, while his father is from Iraq. His mother died of cancer when he was six years old. His stepmother, Pamela, is an American-Israeli.

As an actor, he served his military conscription as an active artist, limiting him to clerical work.

== Career ==
In 2021, Tako starred in Memory Forest, a television miniseries about an Israeli youth group's journey to the German extermination camps in Poland. In 2023, he played Shlomi in the Israeli war drama film The Vanishing Soldier. That year, he also starred in the youth drama television series Metukim. In 2024, he starred in the film Come Closer and played Saint Joseph in the epic biblical film Mary.

In 2026, Tako acted in Moshe Rosenthal's film Tell Me Everything, and in the same year, he won an Ophir Award for his role in the film To Where.

== Filmography ==
=== Film ===
Year	Title	Role	Notes	Ref.
2021	By His Will	Elisha	Short film	
2023	The Vanishing Soldier	Shlomi		
2024	Come Closer	Nati		
2024	Youthful Grace			
2024	Mary	Joseph		
2026	Tell Me Everything	Boaz		

=== Television ===
Year	Title	Role	Notes	Ref.
2020	The Commune	Yahel		
2021	Nevsu	Amichai		
2021–23	Sky	Eric	Main role	
2022	Memory Forest	Kobi	Main role	
2022	Fire Dance	Shiye		
2022	Munich 72	Ze'ev Friedman		
2022–present	Hamenachem ha-25	Yoni	Main role	
2023	The Cops	Ofek		
2023	Metukim	Amir	Main role	
2024	Black Space	Raffa		
2024	Sisters			
2025	The German	Eitan Zahavi		

=== Music videos ===
Year	Title	Artist	Role	Ref.
2021	"The Way"	Dennis Lloyd	Himself	

== Awards and nominations ==
Award	Year	Category	Work	Result	Ref.
Ophir Awards	2023	Best Actor	The Vanishing Soldier	Nominated	
