= Susan Montford =

Scottish film director, screenwriter, and producer

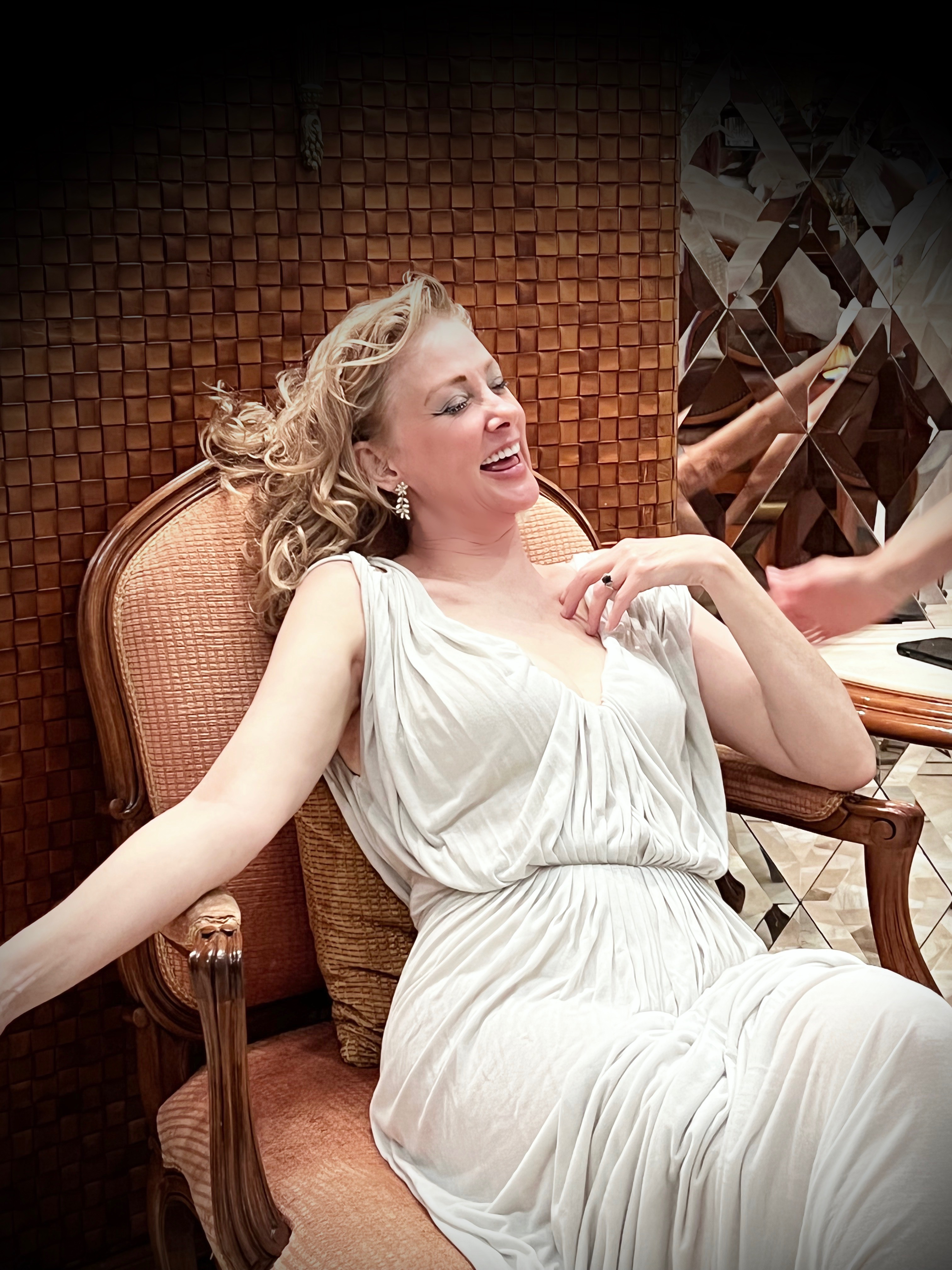
- Born: Glasgow, Scotland
- Education: Gray's School of Art
- Occupation: Film producer

Signature
- angryfilmsentertainment.com

Susan Montford is a Scottish filmmaker living in Los Angeles. She has produced, written and directed movies that range from cult hits to blockbusters.

She was born in Glasgow, Scotland. She is related to the Scottish football commentator Arthur Montford.

Obsessed with art and film and literature as a child, she attended Cardonald College and Gray's School of Art and the Glasgow School of Art where she worked across many mediums from installation through sculpture, photography, films and text. Her art works have been exhibited throughout Scotland at many galleries and pop up art spaces including the Transmission Gallery and the Stirling Smith Art Gallery and Museum. Montford was an early, active member of Women in Profile during the "herstories" era at Glasgow Women's Library, when she worked with women escaping from domestic violence. She also created the Bookmakers workshops and worked with deprived kids at Street Level Photoworks. She ran many workshops while developing her art and writing.

She went on to direct and write short films including Hairpin and Strangers with grants from the Scottish Film Council. Her work was shown at the Toronto International Film Festival. She moved to Los Angeles to specialize in film. She developed on her first feature film, The Family Jam, a drama about the early days of the Charles Manson Family based on the book by Ed Sanders While in Los Angeles she developed several films for Sony Pictures Entertainment.

Her first major hit was the 2007 film Shoot 'Em Up, on which she played a "really hands on [role]... from the casting to the music, and it was a great feeling to have it come together." Following the success of that film she wrote and directed the thriller While She Was Out starring Kim Basinger and Lukas Haas which was released in December 2008. Susan produced Splice a twisted fairy tale released by Warner Brothers and directed by Vincenzo Natali.

Susan produced the DreamWorks hit film Real Steel, which starred Hugh Jackman and was directed by Shawn Levy from a story by Richard Matheson. A sequel has been announced. Susan produced the thriller Vampire Academy directed by Mark Waters based on the New York Times bestselling series of books, as well as the Bryan Fuller created television movie High Moon.

She is currently in development on a modern horror version of the classic mondo series Faces of Death for Legendary Entertainment and is also producing with them on a TV series based on space classic Buck Rogers. She is working with The Jim Henson Company on an animated series based on a Prince song.

She is married to Don Murphy, the American film director, film producer of Natural Born Killers and the Transformers, and screenwriter with whom she frequently collaborates.
