= Baba ben Buta =

Jewish sage

Baba ben Buta (Hebrew: בבא בן בוטא) was a Jewish sage who lived at the time of Herod the Great, who is mentioned in the Talmud.

== Biography ==
He may have been a member of the prominent family known as The Sons of Baba ("Bnei Baba"), who, at the time of Herod's siege of Jerusalem (37 BC), resisted its surrender, and whom Costobarus protected from the wrath of Herod for twelve years, until they were discovered and put to death.

According to a tradition preserved in the Babylonian Talmud, Baba ben Buta was the only teacher of the Law who was spared by Herod. According to this tradition it was Baba ben Buta, deprived of his eyesight by Herod, who advised Herod to rebuild the Temple in expiation of his great crimes. The following conversation between the king and the blind teacher, with its aggadic embellishments, forms the principal part of this tradition, and is considered likely to have some historical foundation:

"One day Herod came to visit the blind teacher and, sitting down before him, said, 'See how this wicked slave [Herod] acts.' Said he [Baba] to him, 'What can I do to him?' Said he, 'Curse him, sir.' Said he, 'It is written, "Curse not the king; no, not in thy thought."' 'But,' said Herod, 'he is no king.' Upon which Baba said, 'Let him be only a man of wealth, it is written (ib.), "And curse not the rich in thy bedchamber"; or let him be merely a chief, it is written, "Curse not a ruler of thy people."' 'But,' said Herod, 'this is interpreted to mean a ruler that acts according to the customs of thy people; but that man [Herod] does not act according to the customs of thy people.' Said he, 'I am afraid of him,' to which Herod replied, 'There is no man here to go and tell him; for I and thou sit here alone.' Said he, 'It is written (Ecclesiastes l.c.), "For a bird of the air shall carry the voice, and that which hath wings shall tell the matter."'

"Herod now disclosed himself, and said, 'Had I known that the rabbis were so discreet, I should not have put them to death. What, now, can a man like me do to repair this wrong?' 'He,' said Baba, 'has extinguished the light of the world [put to death the teachers], as it is written (Prov. vi. 23), "For the commandment is a lamp; and the Law is light"; let him busy himself with the light of the world [the Temple], of which it is written (Isa. ii. 2), "All nations shall flow unto it"' [a play on nahar, which also means "light"]. Said Herod, 'I am afraid of the [Roman] government.' To which Baba replied, 'Send a messenger; he will be one year in going to Rome, will be detained there one year, and make his home voyage in one year, and in the meanwhile thou shalt have torn down and built'; and Herod did accordingly."

== Teachings ==
In halachic tradition, Baba ben Buta is recorded as a disciple of Shammai. It is said that he prevented an opinion of Shammai concerning a question of laying one's full body-weight upon animal sacrifices (prior to their slaughter) from becoming a rule of law, because he was convinced of the correctness of Hillel's opinion who permitted the practice. Baba is reported to have been so scrupulous in his religious observances that he brought a free-will offering every day, for fear that he might have committed a sin requiring atonement. These sacrifices were called "sin-offerings of the pious". Baba was a member of the beit din, and some sources state that he always saw that justice was done, particularly to women.
