= Moshe Rosenthal =

Israeli film director (born 1985)

- משה רוזנטל
- Rosenthal at the premiere for Tell Me Everything at the 2026 Sundance Film Festival.
- Born: July 8, 1985 (age 41); Holon, Israel
- Occupations: film director and screenwriter
- Notable work: Karaoke, Tell Me Everything
- Awards: Ophir Awards for Best Director and Best Screenplay
- Website: https://www.mosherosenthal.com

Moshe Rosenthal (Hebrew: משה רוזנטל; born July 8, 1985) is an Israeli film director and screenwriter, awarded Ophir Awards for Best Director and Best Screenplay. His debut feature film, Karaoke, won four Ophir Awards in 2022. His second feature film, Tell Me Everything, won ten Ophir Awards in 2026.

== Biography ==
Rosenthal was born and raised in Holon, Israel, to a mother who worked as a private makeup artist and a father who served as a career military officer before working in operations management. He grew up with two older sisters.

Graduate of the Film Department at Tel Aviv University. Following his studies, Rosenthal worked various odd jobs, including as a cinema usher and writing obituaries for the newspaper Israel Hayom. In 2016, he created, wrote, and directed the web series Confess TLV, which portrayed intimate enco²unters between strangers met through dating apps, with each episode categorized in the style of adult video subgenres. The series was acquired by HOT and later optioned by AMC for an Amer8ican adaptation developed by Julie Delpy. Although Rosenthal spent a year and a half working on the adaptation and briefly relocated to Los Angeles, the project was ultimately scrapped when its intended AMC streaming platform failed to launch.

In 2016, Rosenthal directed the short film Leave of Absence (Shabaton), which won the Best Director award in the short film competition at the Jerusalem Film Festival. The film follows a history teacher (Uri Klauzner) who escapes his female-dominated household in Holon and gets swept into a night of youthful rebellion and male bonding after a chance encounter with his former students. He subsequently directed Our Way Back (2018), a short film from the collection "3 Stories from the Arava", which screened at the BFI London Film Festival and was nominated for an Ophir Award. The short film centers on a family man (Lior Ashkenazi) living in the Arava who must confront the tragic consequences of a secret relationship with a younger man during a trip to the desert.

Rosenthal wrote his debut feature film, Karaoke, in just one week in 2018 to secure a grant from a Tel Aviv University film fund. Released in late 2022, the film stars Sasson Gabai and Rita Shukrun as a middle-aged couple in Holon whose mundane lives are upended by a charismatic new penthouse neighbor, played by Lior Ashkenazi. Karaoke premiered at the Tribeca Film Festival, won Best First Film at the Jerusalem Film Festival, and received 14 Ophir Award nominations, ultimately winning four (Best Actor, Best Actress, Best Original Music, Best Soundtrack). The film's international festival run brought further recognition, earning Rosenthal the Best Director and Best Screenplay awards at the Raindance Film Festival, as well as the Programmers' Award for Narrative Feature at the Virginia Film Festival. A planned big-budget French remake of the film was abruptly canceled shortly before production was set to begin, after investors withdrew their funding following the October 7 attacks.

In 2026, Rosenthal wrote and directed the feature film Tell Me Everything, which centers on a young boy in 1987 who discovers his father is gay during the height of the AIDS epidemic and sets out to search for him a decade later to make amends. The film premiered at the Sundance Film Festival, the first Israeli feature in a decade to be included, before serving as the opening-night film at the Jerusalem Film Festival. It went on to earn a record-breaking 16 nominations and 10 wins at the Ophir Awards, where Rosenthal won Best Director and Best Screenplay, and the film won Best Picture. Consequently, Tell Me Everything was chosen as Israel's official submission for the Best International Feature category at the Academy Awards. The film has secured international distribution across France, Australia, New Zealand, and Indonesia, alongside a regional deal with HBO CEE across Central and Eastern Europe.

== Filmography ==
- 2016 - Leave of Absence
- 2018 - Our Way Back
- 2022 - Karoke
- 2026 - Tell Me Everything

== Awards ==
- 2016 – Best Director (Jerusalem Film Festival) – Israeli film director
- 2022 – Best First Film (Jerusalem Film Festival) – Karaoke
- 2022 – Best Director & Best Screenplay (Raindance Film Festival) – Karaoke
- 2022 – Programmers' Award for Narrative Feature (Virginia Film Festival) – Karaoke
- 2026 – Best Director, Best Screenplay & Best Picture (Ophir Awards) – Tell Me Everything
