= Naya Bienstock =

Israeli actress

- נאיה בינשטוק
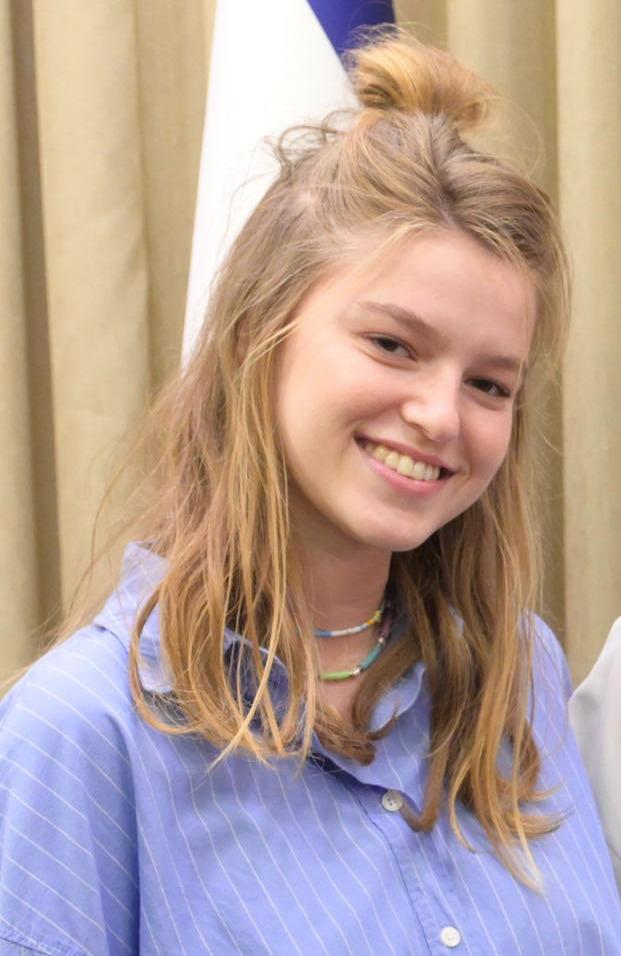
- Bienstock in 2022
- Born: 21 January 2001 (age 25); Ramat HaSharon, Israel
- Occupation: Actress
- Years active: 2019–present

Naya Bienstock (Hebrew: נאיה בינשטוק; born 21 January 2001) is an Israeli actress. She is known for her stage performance as Tamar in the play The One My Soul Loves and for her role as Sheyne Shulman in the 2022 Israeli television drama series Fire Dance.

== Early life ==
Bienstock was born in Ramat HaSharon. She attended Rothberg High School and the Nissan Nativ Drama School.

In 2020, she completed her mandatory military service in the Israel Defense Forces.

== Career ==
Bienstock made her acting debut in the 2019 film Full Gas. In 2020, she got a leading role in the television series Rising. In 2021, she was cast in the television series Mekif Milano and made her stage debut in the play The One My Soul Loves. In 2022 she starred in the film Ole LaRosh and the television show Golda & Meir.

== Theatre ==
Year	Title	Role	Notes
2021	The One My Soul Loves	Tamar	

== Filmography ==
=== Film ===
Year	Title	Role	Notes
2019	Full Gas		
2022	Ole LaRosh		

=== Television ===
Year	Title	Role	Notes
2020–2022	Palmach	Elinor Dasberg	97 episodes
2021	Mekif Milano	Nurit "Nuri" Naor	
2022	Golda & Meir	Eli	15 episodes
2022	Fire Dance	Sheyne Shulman	
2023	4:20	Tilly	
2024	Black Space	Neta Zahavi	8 episodes
2025	The German	Tamar Zahavi	
2026	The Escape	Feigy	8 episodes
