= Jerusalem Film Festival =

Film festival

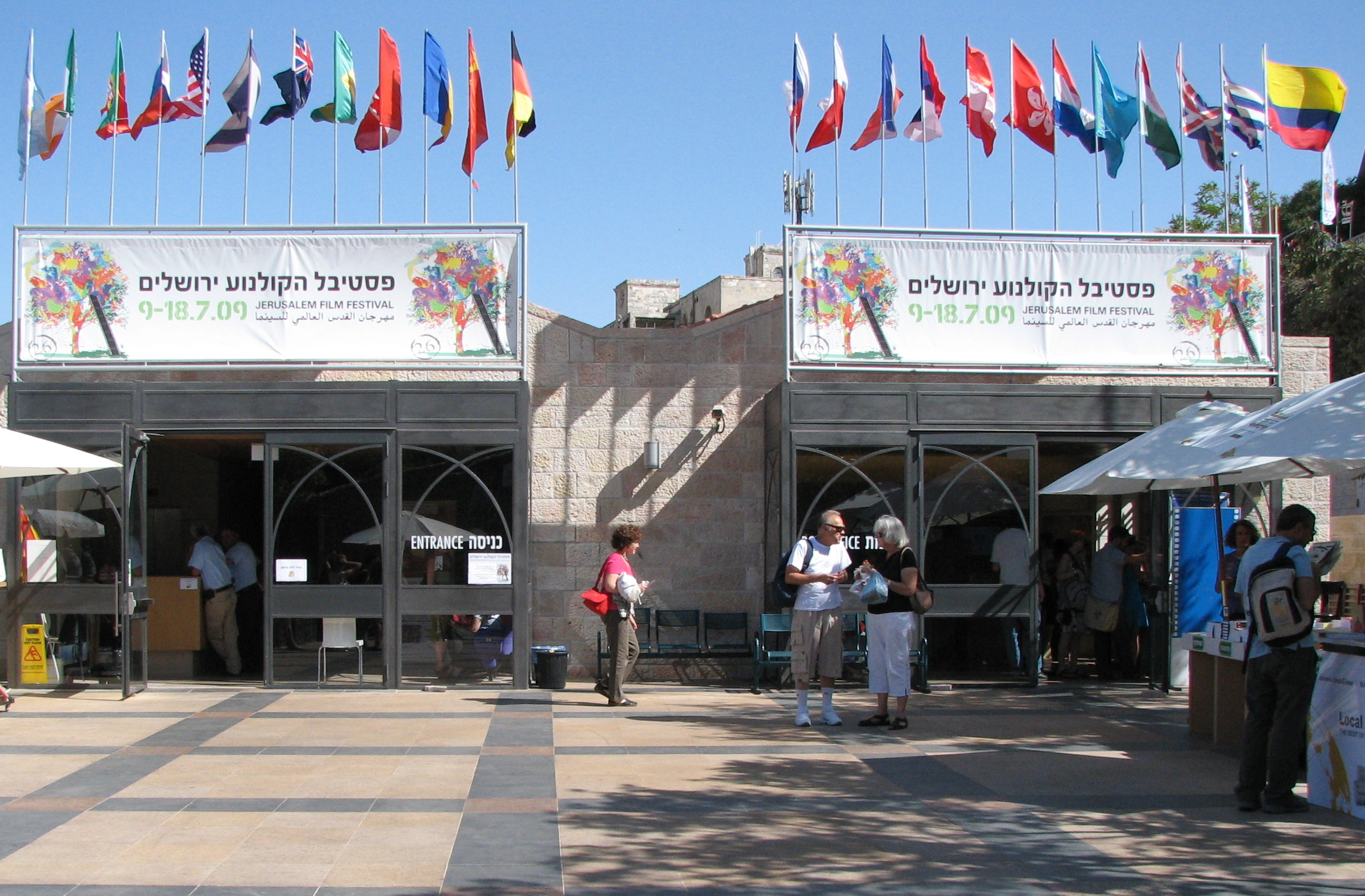
- Jerusalem Film Festival, July 2009
- Location: Jerusalem
- Founded: 17 May 1984; 42 years ago
- Awards: Wolgin / Haggiag Award for Israeli Cinema Spirit of Freedom Award; Anat Pirchi Drama Award; Best International Film; Jewish Experience Awards International Debut Award
- Website: www.jff.org.il

The Jerusalem Film Festival (Hebrew: פסטיבל הקולנוע ירושלים, Arabic: مهرجان القدس السينمائي) is an international film festival held annually in Jerusalem, It was established in 1984 by the Director of the Jerusalem Cinematheque and Israeli Film Archive, Lia Van Leer, and has since become the main Israeli event for filmmakers and enthusiasts. Over the course of ten days every summer, over 200 films from 60 countries are screened at the Festival, along with a variety of special events, panels, and meetings with prominent local and international filmmakers, as well as professional industry workshops and events.

== History ==
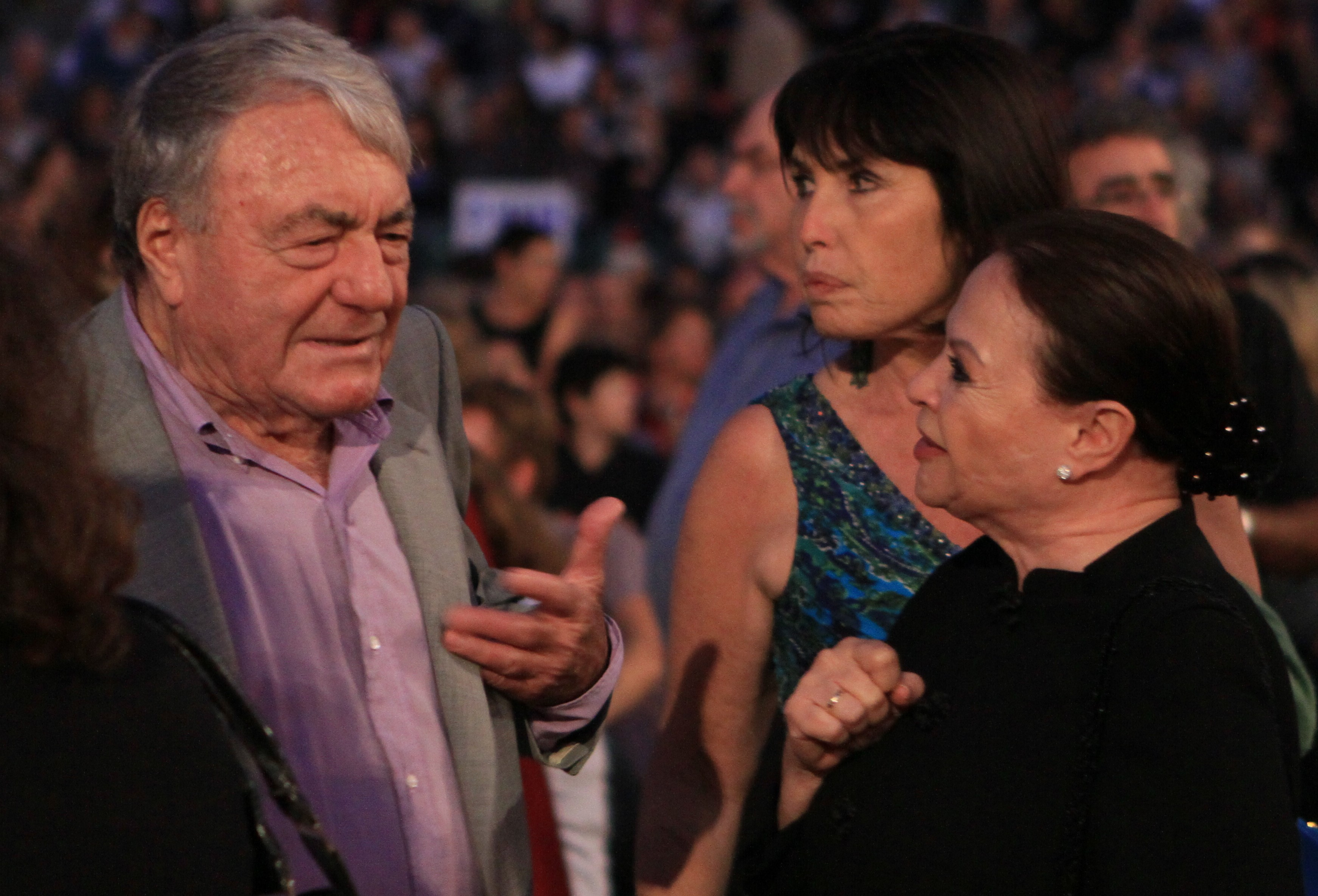
Gila Almagor and Claude Lanzmann at Jerusalem film festival, 2010

The Festival was established by Israel Prize recipient and founder of the Jerusalem Cinematheque and Israeli Film Archive, Lia Van Leer. After being invited to serve on the jury at the 1983 Cannes Film Festival, Van Leer decided to create Israel's first international film festival. Already in its first year, the Festival had the honor of hosting key cinematic figures such as Jeanne Moreau, Lillian Gish, Warren Beatty and John Schlesinger.

Since 2005, the Festival has included the Pitch Point, a platform for Israeli artists to present their full-length feature projects in stages of development and production, to select members of the international film industry. This allows local filmmakers to create international networks of communication, expand financing and resources, and promote co-productions and potential collaborations.

== Festival Competitions ==
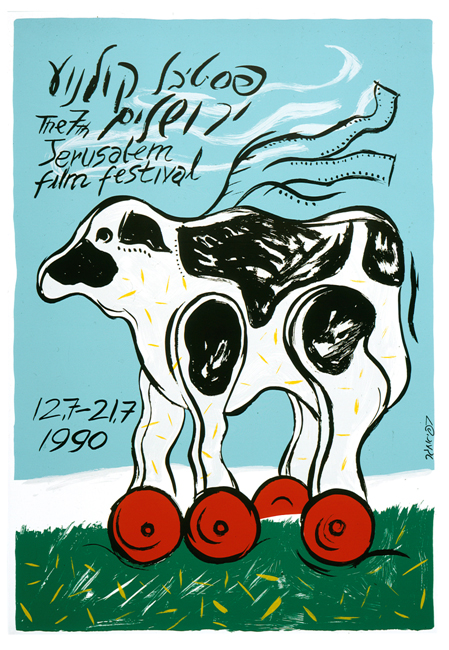
Film festival poster

The Festival spotlights Israeli cinema, with competitions carrying the largest awards, exposes local art to international journalists and professionals, screens Israeli premieres along with retrospectives and new restorations of the finest Israeli films. Through these competitions, nearly 10 million dollars in prizes have been awarded to Israeli filmmakers in the fields of feature, documentary, student, and short films.

=== Awards for Israeli Cinema ===
The Festival awards prizes for best international films. Other prizes are the In the Spirit of Freedom Award for cinematic pieces dealing with man's constant strife for justice and freedom, the Intersections prize competition for experimental film, the International Debut Award, the Jewish Experience Award for films dealing with issues of Jewish identity and history, and the Wim van Leer Award for High School Students.

=== List of Wolgin / Haggiag Prize Recipients for Full-Length Feature Films ===
Director	Film	Year
Isaac Zepel Yeshurun	Green Fields	1989
Daniel Wachsmann	The Appointed	1990
Avraham Heffner	Laura Adler's Last Love Affair	1990
Savi Gabizon	Shuru	1991
Amos Guttman	Amazing Grace	1992
Aner Preminger	Dummy in a Circle	1993
Dan Wolman	The Distance	1994
Eli Cohen	Under the Domim Tree	1995
Savi Gabizon	Lovesick on Nana Street	1995
Joseph Pichadze	Under Western Eyes	1996
Julie Schlez	Afula Express	1997
Amos Gitai	Yom Yom	1998
Arik Kaplun	Yana's Friends	1999

Director	Film	Year
Joseph Pichadze	Besame Mucho	2000
Dan Wolman	Foreign Sister	2000
Dover Kosashvili	Late Marriage	2001
Nir Bergman	Broken Wings	2002
Savi Gabizon	Nina's Tragedies	2003
Taufik Abu Wael	Atash (Thirst)	2004
Keren Yedaya	Or (My Treasure)	2004
Eyal Halfon	What a Wonderful Place	2005
Dror Sabo	Dead End	2006
Eran Kolirin	The Band's Visit	2007
Shlomi Elkabetz and Ronit Elkabetz	Shiva	2008
Yaron Shani and Scandar Copti	Ajami	2009
Nir Bergman	Intimate Grammar	2010
Yossi Madmoni	Good Morning Mr. Fidelman	2011
Ami Livne	Sharqiya	2012
Tom Shoval	Youth	2013
Ronit and Shlomi Elkabetz	Gett – The Trial of Viviane Amsalem	2014
Tali Shalom Ezer	Princess	2014
Avishai Sivan	Tikkun	2015
Asaf Polonsky	One Week and a Day	2016
Matan Yair	Scaffolding	2017
Yona Rozenkier	The Dive	2018
Tsivia Barkai-Yacov	Red Cow	2018

== Opening Event at Sultan's Pool ==
The Jerusalem Film Festival holds its traditional opening event at Sultan's Pool in the presence of film enthusiasts, public dignitaries, and invited guests.

Year	Dates	Opening Film	Notable Guests
1984	May 27 – June 17	Le Bal by Ettore Scola	Warren Beatty, Lillian Gish, John Schlesinger, Jeanne Moreau, Andre Delvaux, Marianne Rosenbaum, Edna Politi, Peter Patzak, Menachem Golan, Yoram Globus, Gila Almagor, Izza Genini, Dr. Martin Peretz, Lilly Rivlin, David McLeod, Michael Childers
1985	June 1 – June 8	Rembetiko by Costas Ferris	Vittorio Taviani, Paul Cox, Charlotte Silvera, Lindsay Kemp, Nina Rosenblum
1986	June 28 – July 5	Ginger and Fred by Federico Fellini	Agnieszka Holland, Vera Belmont, Erika Szanto, Axel Corti, Tony Palmer, Klaus Hellwig, Izza Genini, Alain Marchand, Tuncel Kurtiz, Diana Rigg, Katalin Petenyi, Carol Polakoff, Desire Ecare, Binnie Kristal-Andersson, Seref Gur, Johanna Spector, Bengt and Irmgard von zur Muhlen
1987	June 27 – July 4	Late Summer Blues by Renen Schorr	Marcello Mastroianni, Peter Ustinov, Jack Gold, Nagisa Oshima, Alan Arkin, Delphine Seyrig, Jorgen Leth, Marta Meszaros, Jan Nowicki, Stole Popov, Svetozar Cvetkovic, Giuseppe Rossini, Gilbert Marouani, Shiela Whitaker, Renee Lichtig, Kryzsztof Zanussi, Carl Davis
1988	June 30 – July 9	A Tribute to Israeli Cinema	Jane Birkin, Fanny Ardant, Atom Egoyan, Arsinée Khanjian, Andraas Gervai, Jose Luis Gutierrez, Erica Szanto, Official Soviet Cultural Delegation
1989	June 29 – July 8	Splendor, by Ettore Scola	Mona Gamal el-din, Ildiko Enyedi, Chantal Akerman, Grazyna Szapolowska, Albert Johnson, Derek Malcolm, Srdjan Karanovic, Gerhard Sceumann, Jean-Claude Brisseau, Lino Brocka, Ivan Nitchev, Marina Goldovskaya, Fiorella Infascelli, Mark Shivas
1990	July 12 – July 21	The Appointed, by Daniel Wachsmann	Sijiri Bakaba, Ayala Bakaba, Jiri Menzel, Paulus Manker, Gianni Amelio, Herbert Kline, Lucian Pintilie, Andras Suranyi, Henry Jaglom, Vladimir Alenikov, Jim Hoberman, Derek Malcolm
1991	July 4 – July 13	Homicide, by David Mamet	Mike Leigh, Roger Corman, Chen Kaige, Vera Belmont, Sasha Harari, Amos Poe, Deepa Mehta, Jon Jost, David Mamet
1992	July 9 – July 18	Howards End, by James Ivory, Strictly Ballroom, by Baz Luhrmann	Chris Marker, Hal Hartley, Adrienne Shelly, Alan Corneau, Gail Singerm, Lina Wermuller, Isaac Julien, Baz Luhrmann, Armin Mueller-Stahl, Katherine Gilday, Dana Rotberg, Janis Lundman
1993	July 1 – July 10	Much Ado About Nothing by Kenneth Branagh (International Premiere)	Robert De Niro, Arnon Milchan, Harvey Keitel, Otar Iosseliani, Ed Pressman, Henry Jaglom, Dusan Makavejev, Ingrid Caven, Michael Kalik, Sally Potter, Idrissa Ouedraogo, Sheila Whitaker, Mark Shivas, Theo van de Sande
1994	June 30 – July 9	The Hudsucker Proxy by Joel Coen	Krzysztof Kieslowski, Zbigniew Preisner, Irene Jacob, Marin Karmitz, Elia Kazan, Mahmoud Zemmouri, Rose Troche, Guinvere Turner, Susanne Bier, Mark Langer, Mark Shivas
1995	July 6 – July 18	The Madness of King George by Nicholas Hytner	Claude Lelouch, Michel Boujenah, Alessandra Martines, Arnon Milchan, Arthur Cohen, Bertrand Tavernier, Henry Jaglom, Xavier Beauvois, Boaz Yakin, Robert Crumb, Vadim Abdrashitov, Savva Koulish, Laura Blum, Ridha Behi, Marina Cordoni, Astrid Frank, Izza Genini
1996	July 4 – July 13	Kansas City, by Robert Altman	Krzysztof Zanussi, Chantal Akerman, Derek Malcolm, Susanne Bier, Seymour Cassel, Pierre Chained, Danniel, Ricardo Dias, Jim Hoberman, Jose Lewgoy, Ken Lipper, David Robinson
1997	July 10 – July 19	The Fifth Element, by Luc Besson	Alan Rudolph, Bob Hoskins, Christopher Hampton, Francesco Rosi, Clyde Jeavons, Herbert Beigel, Alan Berliner, Michael Verhoeven, Ulrike Ottinger, Becki Probst, Alexander Shpilyuk
1998	July 9 – July 18	The Big Lebowski, by the Coen Brothers	Roberto Benigni, Manoel de Oliveira, Jeroen Krabbe, Alan Rickman, Jesse Peretz, Jeremy Thomas, Stanley Kwan, Ferzan Ozpetek, Andreas Thomopoulos, Lidia Bobrova
1999	July 8 – July 17	All About My Mother, by Pedro Almodóvar	Terrence Malick, Ettore Scola, Vittorio and Paolo Taviani, Marisa Paredes

The Jerusalem Film Festival opening event at the 21st Century
Year	Dates	Opening Film	Notable Guests
2000	July 13 – July 22	Crouching Tiger, Hidden Dragon, by Ang Lee	Ang Lee, Anna Thomson, Anthony Bregman, Errol Morris, Istvan Szabo, Jack Wolgin, James Schamus Jerzy Stuhr, Kirk Douglas, Leon Constantiner, Michael Cacoyannis, Nuri Bilge Ceylan, Sabu, Wim Wenders, Volker Schlondorff
2001	July 12 – July 21	Shrek, by Andrew Adamson and Vicky Jenson	Stephen Frears, B.Z Goldberg, Henry Bean, Malgorzata Szumowska, Ferzan Ozpetek, Radu Gabrea, Andrei Smirnov, Veronique Cayla, David Kessler, Diane Weyerman
2002	July 18 – July 27	Talk to Her by Pedro Almodóvar	Krzystof Zanussi, David Mamet, Anthony Bergman, Godfrey Cheshire, Amos Gitai
2003	July 10 – July 19	Hero by Zhang Yimou	Geoffrey Gilmore, Uri Fruchtmann, David Kustow, Hany Abu-Assad, Wolfgang Becker, Jean-Pierre Dardenne, Luc Dardenne, Amos Kollek, Aviva Slesin, Sean Welch, Wouter Baremdrecht, Sandrine Brauer, Pierre Menahem, Michel Reilvac, Diane Weyerrmann
2004	July 8 – July 17	Life is a Miracle by Emir Kusturica	Anthony Minghella, Emir Kusturica, Dimitri Epides, Ademir Kenovic, Chantal Akerman, Oliver Becker, Ludi Boeken, Anthony Bregman, Niv Fichman, Sam Green, Ulrike Ottinger, Sarig Peker, Jan Schuette, Prasanna Vithanage, Humbert Balsan, Marion Doring, Fabrizio Mosca, Nik Powell, Renate Roginas, Marieanne Bergmann, David Kessler
2005	July 7 – July 16	War of the Worlds by Steven Spielberg	Karen Shakhnazarov, Buddhadeb Dasgupta, Ilya Khrzhanovsky, Chris McDonald, Marion Dörling, Marieanne Bergmann, Sharon Rivo, Niv Fischman, Peter Forgács, Lee Kang Sheng, Victor Silakong Kriengsak, Jean-Xavier de Lestrade, Tsai Ming-Liang, Michèle Ohayon, David Puttnam, Pola Rapaport
2006	July 6 – July 15	Someone to Run With by Oded Davidoff	Roman Polanski, Atom Egoyan, Robert Lantos, Debra Winger, Howard Feinstein, Catherine le Clef, Mark Anderson, Chantal Akerman, Josh Appignanesi, Wouter Barnendrecht, Ram Bergman, Alan Berliner, Doug Block, Rex Bloomstein, Andrew Brunsberg, Anthony Bregman, Mimmo Calopresti, Julie Depardieu, Marco Tuliio Giordana, Mia Goldman, Swel and Imad Noury, Michel Reilhac, Lilly Rivlin, Sharon Rivo, Ernst “Etchie” Stroh, István Szabó, Michael J. Werner, Arsinée Khanjian, Denis Robert, Daniel Louis, Marie-Josée Croze, Patricia Rozema, Simcha Jacobovici
2007	July 5 – July 14	Ratatouille, by Brad Bird	Danny Dimbort, Avi Lerner, Azize Tan, Ulrike Ottinger, Wouter Barendrecht, Ehud Bleiberg, Susanne Bier, Jane Birkin, Phillipe Blasband, Jeffrey Blitz, Charles Burnett, Saverio Costanzo, Paul Cronin, Craig A. Emanuel, Neil Friedman, Sisse Graum Jørgensen, Anders Thomas Jensen, Dieter Kosslick, David Kustow, João Moreira Salles, Fabrizio Mosca, Michele Ohayon, Jeff Pulver, Michel Reilhac, David Thompson, Marit van den Elshout, Răzvan Vasilescu, Sean Welch
2008	July 10 – July 19	Wall-E, by Andrew Stanton	Anne Aghion, Anthoney Bergman, José Luis López-Linares, Lucia Cedrón, Molly Dineen, Peter Forgacs, Izza Genini, Huseyin Karabey, Dieter Koslik, David Kustow, Jean-Pierre Lledo, Sergei Loznitsa, Emilio Maillie, John Malkovich, David Schisgall, Michael Winterbottom, Boaz Yakin
2009	July 9 – July 18	A Matter of Size, by Sharon Maymon and Erez Tadmor	Theo Angelopoulos, Karin Albou, Michael Verhoeven, Larry Weinstein, Jacob Wang, Marat Sarulu, Gerald Peary, Peter Rodger, Maria Victoria Menis, Marion Laine
2010	July 8 – July 17	La Rafle, by Roselyne Bosch	Jean Reno, Ulrike Ottinger
2011	July 7 – July 16	Super 8, by J.J. Abrams	Béla Tarr
2012	July 5 – July 14	To Rome with Love, by Woody Allen	
2013	July 4 – July 13	Hunting Elephants, by Reshef Levi	Richard Linklater, Mohsen Makhmalbaf (Gabbeh, Kandahar, Salaam Cinema), Ben Nabors (William and the Windmill), Pablo Berger (Snow White), Janus Merzovsky (Bad Boy), Gil Goldstein (Producer, Valentine Road), Jason Hot, Janet Tobias, Nadav Shirman, Goren Paskelievitz, George Slutzer, Neil Bersky, Rogero Gabay, Yael Melamed
2014	July 10 – July 20	Dancing Arabs, by Eran Riklis	David Mamet, Park Chan-wook, Martina Gedeck
2015	July 9 – July 19	Mia Madre, by Nanni Moretti	John Turturro, John Heyman, Alexander Kosta, Arend Agthe, Dennis Pals, Burhan Qurbani, Claudio Santamaria, Dietrich Brugman, Gabriel Ripstein, Gunter Jonsen, Jayro Bustamante, Mano Lokesh, Oren Shai, Philippe Lacote, Rodriger Zuchsland, Sebastian Schipper, Ulrich Seidl, David Holbrook, Avner Ben Naim
2016	July 7 – July 17	Julieta, by Pedro Almodóvar	Quentin Tarantino, Whit Stillman, Laurie Anderson, Andreas Sinanos, Dylan Liener, Grimun Hakonarson, Anthony Bregman, Alison Thompson, Giorgio Gosetti, Remi Burah, Roberto Ula, Esther Hoffenberg, Jenovefa Bokova, Christian Krones, Roland Schrotthofer, Daniel Raim, Magnus von Horn, Daniel Leconte, Fenton Bailey, Mary Beth Minnis
2017	July 13 – July 23	Redoubtable, by Michel Hazanavicius	Michel Hazanavicius, Louis Garrel, Serge Toubiana, Philippe Garrel, Vasilina Makovestka, Ferenc Torok, Claude Lanzmann, Shaul Schwarz, Christina Clusiau, Clotilde Courau, Heinz Emigholz, Fellipe Gamarano Barbosa
2018	July 27 – August 5	The Unorthodox, by Eliran Malka	Christian Petzold, Sergei Loznitsa, Marcello Fonte, Laura Benson, Valeria Golino, Charles Tesson, Marietta Riesenbik
2019	July 25 – August 4	Parasite, by Bong Joon-ho	
2020	December 10 – 20	Sublet, by Eytan Fox	N/A due to the COVID-19 pandemic
2021	August 24 – September 4	Where Is Anne Frank, by Ari Folman	
2022	July 21 – July 31	Triangle of Sadness, by Ruben Östlund	Michel Franco, Ruben Östlund, Yvan Attal, Charlotte Gainsbourg, Ben Attal, Sol Bondy, Oeke Hoogendijk, Dan Geller, Dayna Goldfine, Nicolette Krebitz, Milan Herms, Catherine Dussart, Daniel Raim, László Csuja, Volker Schlöndorff, Emre Kayiş, João Pedro Rodrigues, Rithy Panh, Nataša Urban, Abner Benaim
2023	July 13 – July 23	Golda, by Guy Nattiv	Oliver Stone, Guy Nattiv, Helen Mirren, Jean-Pierre & Luc Dardenne, Yael Fogiel, Rainer Frimmel, Vera Gemma, Frauke Finsterwalder, Ramata-Toulaye Sy, Jana Edelbaum, Ido Mizrahy, Nir Sa’ar, Ariel Leon Isacovitch, Irit Batsry, Maria Choustova
2024	July 18 – July 28	Thelma, by Josh Margolin	Quentin Tarantino, Jennifer Jason Leigh
2025	July 17 – July 26	Sentimental Value, by Joachim Trier	Gal Gadot, Lawrence Bender
2026	July 9 – July 19	Tell Me Everything, by Moshe Rosenthal	Marc-Benoît Créancier, Moshe Rosenthal, Angela Schanelec, Jono Bergmann, Benji Bergmann, Sebastian Weyland, Kai Stänicke, Sabine Thalau, Polaris Banks, Ondřej Provazník, Sergey Borovkov, Rafael Kapelinski, Carine Ruszniewski, Jana Hojdová, Anike Fur, Vincent Grashaw

== See also ==
- Culture of Israel
- Cinema of Israel
