= List of Israeli films of 1999 =

A list of films produced by the Israeli film industry in 1999.

== 1999 releases ==
Premiere	Title	Director	Cast	Genre	Notes	Ref
4 January	Aaron Cohen's Debt (Hebrew: חובו של אהרון כהן)	Amalia Margolin	Moshe Ivgy, Avital Abergel, Abu-Warda and Uri Avrahami	Crime, Drama	Won three Banff Rockie Awards	
21 January	Jewish Vendetta	Aleksandr Shabatayev	Leonid Kanevskiy, Liron Levo, Levana Finkelstein	Thriller		
10 February	Shine	Gidi Dar		Documentary		
18 February	Love at Second Sight (Hebrew: אהבה ממבט שני)	Michal Bat-Adam	Michal Zoharetz, Alon Aboutboul	Drama		
31 March	The Specialist	Eyal Sivan	Adolf Eichmann (archive footage), Gideon Hausner (archive footage), Gabriel Bach (archive footage)	Documentary		
14 May	Kadosh (Hebrew: קדוש)	Amos Gitai	Yael Abecassis, Yoram Hattab	Drama	Israeli-French co-production; Entered into the 1999 Cannes Film Festival	
22 June	Speedway Junky	Nickolas Perry	Richard Balin, Jaime Bergman, Jesse Bradford	Crime, Drama, Romance		
5 July	Yana's Friends (Hebrew: החברים של יאנה)	Arik Kaplun	Evelyn Kaplun, Nir Levy	Comedy, Drama, Romance		
5 October	Delta Force One: The Lost Patrol	Joseph Zito	Gary Daniels, Mike Norris, Bentley Mitchum	Action		
9 December	Tzur Hadassim (Hebrew: צור הדסים)	Eran Kolirin	Orly Ben-Garti, Danny Steg, Dafna Rechter and Albert Iluz	Drama		
23 December	Volcano Junction (Hebrew: צומת וולקן)	Eran Riklis	Oren Shabo, Sami Huri, Yael Hadar, Danny Steg and Tomer Sharon	Drama		

=== Unknown premiere date ===
Premiere	Title	Director	Cast	Genre	Notes	Ref
?	Mivtza Savta (Hebrew: מצבע סבתא, lit. "Operation Grandma")	Dror Shaul	Rami Heuberger, Ami Smolartchik, Tzach Shpitzen, Einat Weitzman	Comedy	Made-for-TV film	
?	Frank Sinatra Is Dead (Hebrew: פרנק סינטרה מת)	Nadav Levitan	Dafna Armoni, Anat Atzmon	Drama		
?	Rig'ei Hesed	Jorge Gurvich		Documentary		
?	Jews' Blues	Avi Herny		Documentary		

== Awards ==
=== Ophir Award ===	=== Wolgin Award ===

== See also ==
- 1999 in Israel
