= Shai Avivi =

Israeli actor (born 1964)

- שי אביבי
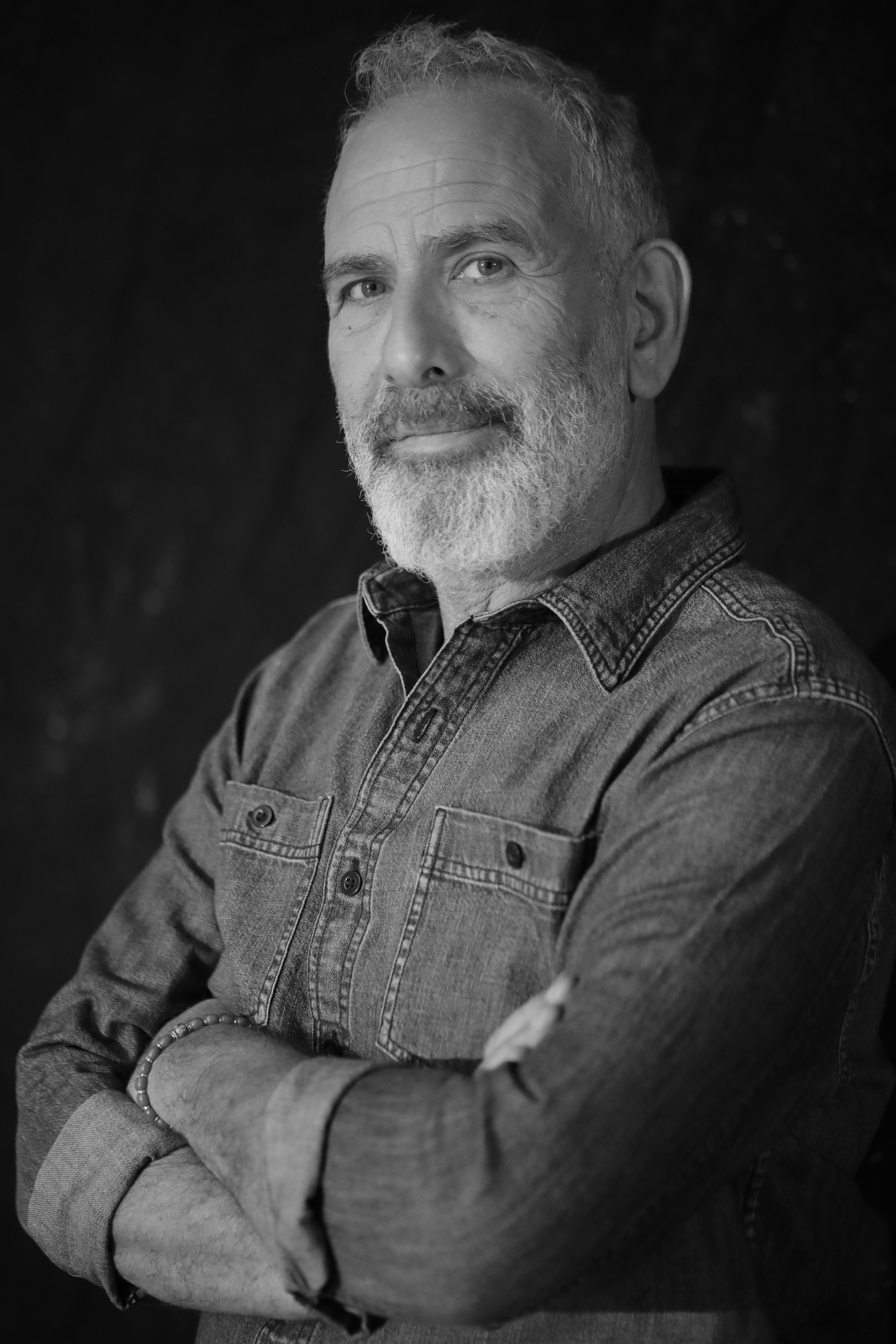
- Avivi in 2021
- Born: 29 April 1964 (age 62); Acre, Israel
- Citizenship: Israeli
- Occupations: Actor; comedian; television presenter
- Years active: 1991–present
- Spouse: Michal Livdinsky
- Children: 2

Shai Avivi (Hebrew: שי אביבי; born 29 April 1964) is an Israeli actor, comedian and television presenter. Regarded as one of the best performers of his generation in Israel, he is recognized for his versatile work across independent films, television and the stage. He has received numerous accolades, including an Ophir Award for Best Actor for his role in Nir Bergman's Here we Are (2020).

After graduating from Tel Aviv University, he appeared in the drama film, Cup Final (1991). He received Ophir Award nominations for Best Actor for his performances in One Week and a Day (2016) and Longing (2017).

== Early life ==
Avivi was born and raised in Acre as one of three children of Moshe Avivi, originally from Iran, and Ahuva, a native Israeli, originally from Lithuania.

He completed his military service in Nahal, during which he took part in fighting in the First Lebanon War.

== Career ==
In 1991, after studying film and television at Tel Aviv University, Avivi made his acting debut in Eran Ricklis’ film “Cup Final”. His first big break came that same year, 1991, when he was one of the first hosts on the first incarnation of The Arutz HaYeladim, which he hosted for several years. In 1993 he gained significant exposure when he participated in the successful satire show “Hahamishia Hakamerit”, which aired on “Telad” on Channel 2 and later on Channel 1. Alongside Avivi starred Keren Mor, Dov Navon, Rami Heuberger and Menashe Noy. That same year he acted in the film “August Snow”, and also appeared in the music video for the hit song “Yaakov” by the band “Laldein”, in which he is seen lip-syncing the rap part of the song (actually performed by Yair Shahar). In 1996 he starred in the film “Malka Lev Adom” by Etgar Keret and Ran Tal. After “Hahamishia Hakamerit” ended in 1997, Avivi returned to hosting, with the talk show “A Night Incident” (1997) and the game show “Stars in a Square” (1999), both on “Keshet” on Channel 2. He also starred in the films “Dring Dring” and “End of the World”.

In 1999, Avivi participated in voicing his own role in the computer game "Piposh".

In 2000 Avivi starred in the successful drama series "The Bourgeoisie", alongside his friends from "Hahamishia Hakamerit", on "Keshet" on Channel 2. "The Bourgeoisie" was very successful, and aired three acclaimed and award-winning seasons. At the same time, he participated in the series "Chant Li" (2002) and hosted "Two Experts and a Fool" (2003) on "Logi" channel. During that period Avivi moved behind the scenes, creating several TV shows, including "Behind the News" (2003), and was eventually appointed in 2005 to head Keshet Channel 10's content department. In those years he participated in the series "Love Hurts" (2004) on Channel 10, and appeared as a panelist on "Addicted to Playing" on "Reshet", Channel 2. In 2006 he starred in Dror Shaul's Ophir Award winning film "Sweet Mud". That same year he created and starred in the series "Good Tidings", playing himself. The series touches on biographical details from Avivi's life such as his closeness to spirituality or his professional past on the series "The Bourgeoisie" and "The Comic Quintet". He later guest starred on the HOT series "Case of the Week".

In 2009 he played in HOT3's original drama series Pillars of Smoke - a series about a settlement in the Golan Heights whose residents all disappear, starring Tzahi Grad, Efrat Ben Tzur and Marina Maximilian Blumin.

Towards the end of 2009 Avivi joined the cast of the play "The Science of Relationships", written and directed by Ilan Doron. In the play he portrays a married man who falls in love with a young and flirtatious nurse (Tali Sharon).

In February 2010 he joined the third season of the satirical show “Week’s End!”.

In addition, towards the end of 2009 he participated in the program "Once in a Lifetime", and traveled with singer Mooki to a gathering of the Jewish diaspora near King David's tomb in Jerusalem.

In 2011 he guest starred on the series "Tall and Greenbaum", and continued for another season of Pillars of Smoke.

In 2012 he participated in the third season of "Half" called "Half the Real Thing" playing Saul, and also took part in the second season of the drama series "The Prime Minister's Children", alongside his friend from "The Quintet" days Rami Heuberger. That year he also began serving as narrator on the reality show “Come Dine With Me”.

At the beginning of 2013, Avivi and his wife Michal Livdinski performed a show they wrote together about relationships and marriage. Initially they performed the show at private events in their living room salon in Pardes Hana under the name: “Living the Good Life – Shai Avivi and Michal Livdinski”, and later at public venues under the name “Happily Ever After - Shai Avivi and Michal Livdinski”.

In 2015, he began participating in the VIP season of “Master Chef” and won the finale. That same year he played a lead role in Dror Shaul’s comedy “Atomic Falafel”. He also portrayed that year the character of the Mossad deputy director in the TV thriller series “The Seminary”.

In 2016, he played the lead role in the feature film “A Week and a Day” alongside Tomer Kapon, in which he portrayed a bereaved father coping with his son’s death after finding his medical marijuana stash.

In 2017, he played the lead role of Ariel Bloch in Shabi Geva’s film “Longing”.

In 2018 he participated in the series “The Conductor”, playing Asher Tzof, a police investigator participating in a singing group.

In 2019, he took part in the series “Embarrassing Mom”.

In 2020 began airing the series “Kibbutzniks”, in which Avivi played Gershon Karftig, the father of the main character. That same year, he played in the Keshet 13 TV series “Blackspace”.

Avivi won the 2020 Ophir Award for Best Lead Actor for his performance in Nir Bergman’s film “Here We Are”.

In 2021, he returned to voice his own role in a revival of the computer game “Piposh”.

== Personal life ==
Avivi is married to Michal Livdinsky, a screenwriter graduate of the Film and Television Department at Tel Aviv University. The couple have two children and live in Pardes Hanna.
