= Iman Darweesh Al Hams =

Palestinian girl killed by the Israel Defense Forces in 2004

- Born: 1991; Gaza Strip
- Died: 5 October 2004 (aged 12–13); Philadelphi Route, Rafah, Gaza Strip
- Cause of death: Gunshot wound

Iman Darweesh Al Hams (Arabic: ايمان درويش الهمص ʾĪmān Darwīsh al-Hamṣ, also Iyman; 1991 – 5 October 2004) was a 13-year-old Palestinian girl killed by Israel Defense Forces (IDF) fire on 5 October 2004, in Rafah, Gaza Strip.

The IDF commander of the soldiers who shot her was accused by his comrades and Palestinian witnesses of using automatic fire to deliberately shoot her repeatedly, a subject which was brought into investigation. During trial, he expressed no regret over his actions and said he would have done the same even if the girl was a 3-year-old. His legal team argued that the "confirmation of the kill" after a suspect is shot was a standard Israeli military practice to eliminate terrorist threats. The commander was charged with illegal use of his weapon, conduct unbecoming an officer and perverting the course of justice by an Israeli military court but was found not guilty. Human rights groups cite her death as one of several incidents which illustrate a "culture of impunity" in the IDF.

== Overview of the incident ==
Soldiers said they opened fire on the girl because they initially thought she was planting a bomb, although the tape recording of the radio conversation between soldiers at the scene reveals that, from the beginning, she was identified as a child and at no point was a bomb spoken about nor was she described as a threat. After she was hit, soldiers claimed the unit's commanding officer went up to her and kept on shooting her, despite their pleas to stop. No explosives or weapons were found on the girl's body. A search of her bag revealed that it was filled with textbooks.

=== Palestinian witnesses ===
According to Umar Abu Khalifa, 25, "Israeli soldiers stormed the area, the girl left the bag and tried to run. Bullets hit the (girl's) bag and then soldiers opened fire on the girl."

Palestinian witnesses reported that it was more than an hour before Israeli troops would allow medics to evacuate the body in an ambulance. At least fifteen bullets were found in the girl's body by Palestinian hospital officials.

Dr. Mohammed al-Hams, who inspected the child's body told The Guardian newspaper that:

"She has at least 17 bullets in several parts of the body, all along the chest, hands, arms, legs ... The bullets were large and shot from a close distance. The most serious injuries were to her head. She had three bullets in the head.

Ehab Hams, an older brother of the slain girl, expressed his distrust of Israeli military justice: "We demand the prosecution of Iman's killer (but) we do not trust the Israeli judicial system." He added, "My sister was an innocent little girl."

=== Israeli documentary and audio recording of internal communications ===
A documentary screened nationwide on Ilana Dayan's Uvda ("Fact") investigative program on Israel's Channel 2 aired an audio recording of the internal communications between soldiers at the post at the time of the incident.

According to the audio recording, the soldiers of the Givati Brigade identified the victim as "a girl, about 10 years old", describing her as looking "scared to death". Another soldier is heard saying, "Our forces are attacking her", and a lookout says "One of the positions has taken her down." The Givati Brigade company commander, Captain R., is then heard saying "We operated on her. Yes, it seems she has been hit." He later states that he "verified" the killing, and clarifies his actions by stating that:

"This is commander. Anything that's mobile, that moves in the zone, even if it's a three-year-old, needs to be killed. Over."

Israeli soldiers interviewed in the documentary, and whose anonymity was maintained, submitted that their commander had knowingly shot the girl in the head at close range and then emptied his magazine of bullets into her body to "confirm the kill." One of the soldiers said:

"We saw her from a distance of 70 meters. She was fired at ... from the outpost. She fled and was wounded."

The soldiers then explained how while Iman was lying wounded about 70 m from the Israeli guard post, the commander fired two bullets at her head from close range. They added that the commander returned to her body again, put his weapon on the automatic setting, and emptied his entire magazine into her body, disregarding their objections over the walkie-talkie. One of the soldiers said:

"We couldn't believe what he had done. Our hearts ached for her. Just a 13-year-old girl ... How do you spray a girl from close range? He was hot for a long time to take out terrorists and shot the girl to relieve pressure."

== Investigations ==
=== First internal investigation ===
On 11 October 2004, the BBC reported that Israel's top military prosecutor was investigating the army commander for repeatedly firing at the lifeless body of the young girl. The report stated that according to Haaretz newspaper, "confirming the kill" (i.e. shooting combatants at close range to make sure they are dead) goes against Israeli military regulations governing the rules of engagement. On 13 October 2004, CBS reported that the army had suspended the officer during the investigation. On 15 October 2004, it was reported that the officer was cleared of responsibility in the shooting.

The BBC reported that army officials had accepted the commander's claim that "he fired into the ground near the girl after coming under fire in a dangerous area," but that they did not explain why the officer shot into the ground rather than at the source of the fire.

Excerpts from the army statement read:

"The investigation did not find that the company or the company commander had acted unethically ... The investigation concluded that the behaviour of the company commander from an ethical point of view does not warrant his removal from his position."

The officer was nevertheless temporarily suspended due to his poor relations with the soldiers under his command and operational failures. It was further noted that a decision on his career in the army would be given by the end of the week.

Lt. Gen. Moshe Yaalon, the army chief of staff, said repeatedly that the officer had acted properly under the circumstances. The Israeli military police launched a separate investigation.

=== Second internal investigation ===
On 18 November 2004, the Israeli army requested the family's permission to exhume Al Hams' body. The earlier accusations made by the soldiers against their commanding officer of engaging in the outlawed practice of "verifying the kill" had regained currency. The Sydney Morning Herald reported that it was not known whether the girl was already dead or had merely been wounded before being repeatedly shot again. That same month, the army formally charged the officer with two counts of illegally using his weapon, and one count each of obstruction of justice, conduct unbecoming an officer and improper use of authority.

Lt. Gen. Moshe Yaalon conceded that the first military investigation had been "a grave failure". The indictment against the officer alleged that the first investigation was the subject of an attempted coverup.

=== Military tribunal ===
After the commencement of the military tribunal, the Al Hams family and the Public Committee Against Torture in Israel (PCATI) petitioned the Israeli High Court of Justice in January 2005 to request that the investigation be turned over to civilian authorities. The court declined the request in February 2005.

Referred to in public only as Lieutenant R. (or Captain R.), the officer maintained that when he reached the girl's body, he came under fire from Palestinian militants at least 300 yards (270 m) away and shot at the ground to deter the fire. In an interview with the Associated Press, an Israeli military official stated that a soldier in the observation tower claimed the officer's fire was aimed at the girl's body and could offer no explanation as to why the officer shot into the ground rather than at the source of the fire.

Lieutenant R. was released from custody in February 2005 after a key prosecution witness, another IDF lieutenant, who had told the military police investigation that he saw R. fire two individual bullets, followed by a volley, into Al Hams' body, recanted his testimony under intensive cross examination. Earlier, another lookout also retracted parts of his initial testimony against R., attributed by human rights groups to heavy behind-the-scenes military pressure. Though Lieutenant R. had admitted firing two shots into the girl's body from close range to "verify the kill", he denied shooting subsequently. His lawyers, Yoav Meni and Elad Eisenberg, said the practice of "verifying the kill" was used regularly by the IDF to eliminate immediate threats.

=== Acquittal ===
On 15 November 2005, a military tribunal acquitted Captain R., clearing him of all the charges against him.

Upon hearing the verdict, Captain R., burst into tears and turned to the public benches and said: "I told you I was innocent."

Iman's father, Samir al-Hams, responded to the verdict by saying that from the outset there was no intention to hold the officer accountable:

"They did not charge him with Iman's murder, only with small offences, and now they say he is innocent of those even though he shot my daughter so many times ... This was the cold-blooded murder of a girl. The soldier murdered her once and the court has murdered her again. What is the message? They are telling their soldiers to kill Palestinian children."

The Palestinian National Authority condemned the verdict.

=== Military police investigation into first investigation ===
In February 2006, Haaretz newspaper reported that a military police internal investigation found that there were major failures in the October 2004 investigation into the killing of Al Hams.

Two reservist officers appointed by Military Police Commander Brigadier General Roni Benny to examine the military police's conduct during the investigation determined that investigators acted unprofessionally and with negligence. The two officers criticized the decision not to appoint a special investigation team led by higher-ranking, more experienced officials and also noted that the incident was not appropriately documented by the investigation. The military police officer in charge of the investigation was reprimanded and the head of the investigation team was censured.

=== Compensation and promotion to rank of major ===
Subsequent to his acquittal, Captain R. was promoted to the rank of major. In March 2006, he received 82,000 new shekels (roughly $17,000) to compensate him for the cost of his defense and time spent in jail. Captain R. also filed a libel suit against Ilana Dayan and the Telad production company. The district court accepted the suit and awarded him 300,000 shekels in damages. The decision was overturned in part by the Supreme Court, which ruled that Telad should pay only 100,000. The court ruled Dayan did not know that Captain R. was unaware that he was pursuing a child, and so should not be held liable for the news report.

== Further legal actions ==
In 2010 a Jerusalem district court found the claim that "Captain R" had shot Al Hams multiple times to "verify" her death, made by Ilana Dayan in her Uvda ("Fact") TV show on Channel 2, to be libelous, and required them to air a correction and for production company Telad to pay ₪300,000. A 2012 decision by the Israeli Supreme Court acquitted Dayan and reduced the damages to ₪100,000, finding that the statements were "correct at the time of their broadcast", based on honest belief, verified facts and credible sources. The court found that "Captain R" had been unaware that the death he was running out to verify had been that of a 13-year-old girl, but that Ilana Dayan was unaware of this.

== See also ==
- Children in the Israeli–Palestinian conflict
- Muhammed al-Dura
- Faris Odeh
- Khalil al-Mughrabi
