= Keren Mor =

Israeli actress and comedian (born 1964)

- קרן מור
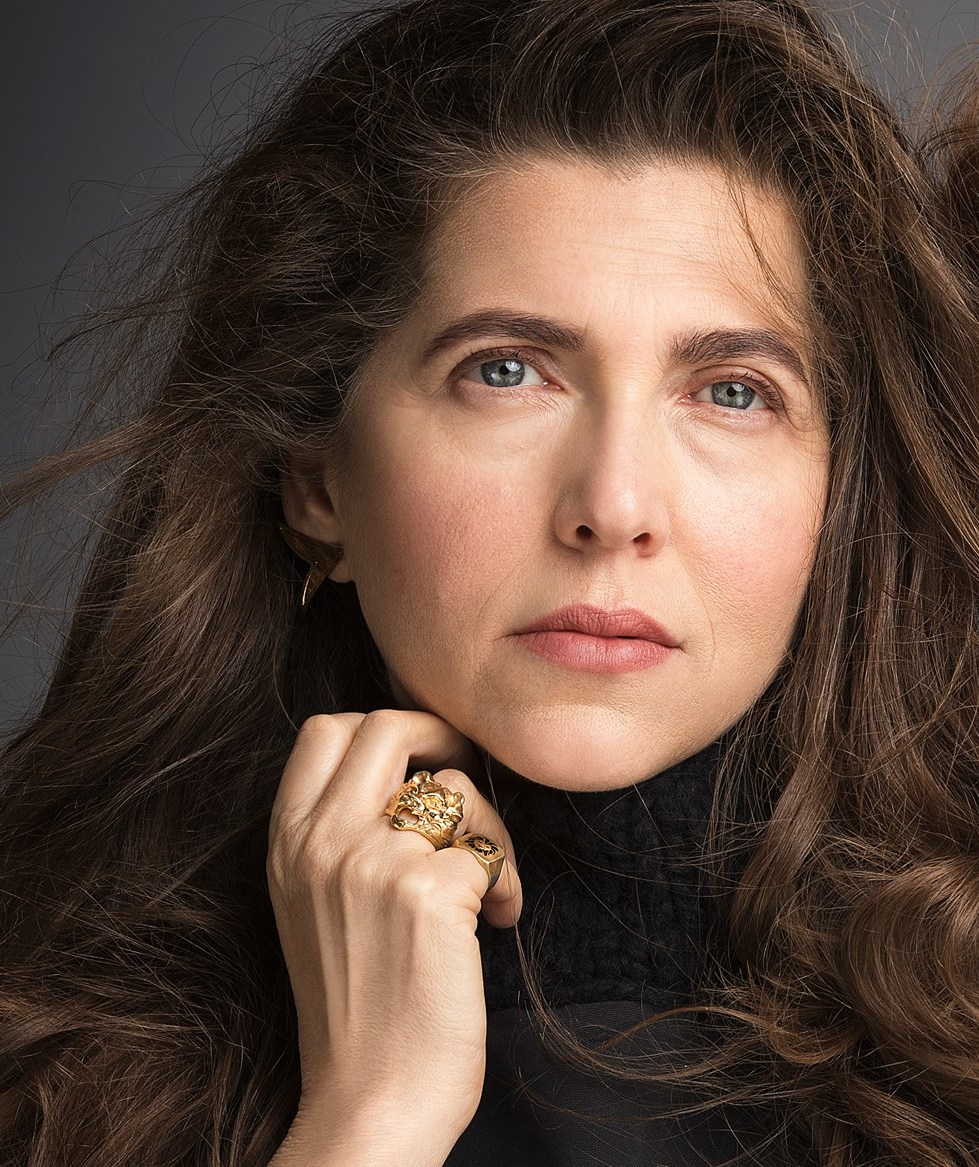
- Born: March 18, 1964 (age 62); Bat Yam, Israel
- Years active: 1987–present
- Spouse: Menashe Noy

Keren Mor (Hebrew: קרן מור; born March 18, 1964) is an Israeli actress and comedian.

== Biography ==
During her mandatory military service in the IDF, Mor studied acting at the Nissan Nativ Acting Studio in Tel Aviv. Mor is married to the Israeli actor Menashe Noy. The couple have two children.

Mor's first major film appearance was in Abba Ganuv (1987). Later she appeared in Amos Gitai's Berlin-Jerusalem (Berlin-Yerushalaim) (1989) and The Lookout (Shuroo) (1990). In 1992 she was in Sivan Arbel's short film Friday Chicken Soup (Marak Off) with Hagit Dasberg, and in Tzvi Shissel's Cables (Kvalim) (1992) with Arik Einstein and Moni Moshonov.

Her television career began with her appearance on the Israeli comedy shows The World Tonight (HaOlam HaErev) and Zehu Ze!. In 1993, she was joined Shai Avivi, Dov Navon, Rami Heuberger and Menashe Noy in the Israeli sketch series The Chamber Quintet (Hahamishia Hakamerit) broadcast between 1993 and 1997. In 1996, she appeared in Orna and Yohanan Raviv's film Dogs Are Color Blind (Klavim Lo Novhim Beyarok).

In 1997 she played in Menashe Noy's film 1812 Overture with Ami Smolartchik and in Amit Hecht's Beep together with Dafna Rechter. In 1998 Mor participated in Noy's second film Trend and in Amos Gitai's film Day After Day (Yom Yom) together with Hanna Maron and Dalit Kahan.

In 2000, she appeared in the TV drama series The Bourgeoisie (Ha-Burganim) in which she joined the original cast of Hahamishia Hakamerit. The show was broadcast between 2000 and 2005. In 2002 she appeared in Hagai Levi's short TV film Premiere (Bchora) with Dan Toren.

In 2004, she played in Joseph Pichhadze's film Year Zero (Shnat Efes). That year she appeared in the TV Sketch series Shorts (Ktsarim) alongside Moni Moshonov and Yuval Segal. In 2005 she also participated in the film Joy (Muchrachim Lehiyot Same'ach) together with Tal Friedman. In 2006 she starred with Ronit Elkabetz and Menashe Noy in the TV drama series On Any Saturday (Parashat Ha-Shavua). In 2008 she appeared in Shlomi and Ronit Elkabetz's film Shiva.

She currently co-stars in the TV series Checkout (Kupa Rashit).

She also works in theater.

== Selected filmography ==
- Abba Ganuv - 1987
- Abba Ganuv II - 1989
- Berlin-Jerusalem - 1989
- The Lookout - 1990
- Cables - 1992
- Zehu Ze!-1993
- The Chamber Quintet - 1993-1997
- Dogs Are Color Blind - 1996
- Overture 1812 - 1997
- Day After Day - 1998
- The Bourgeoisie - 2000-2005
- Year Zero - 2004
- Shorts - 2004-2009
- Joy - 2005
- Foul Gesture - 2006
- Shiva - 2008
- Caramel - 2009
- Kupa Rashit - 2018–present
