= Exodus: A Journey to the Mountain of God =

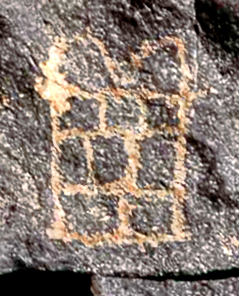
- Prehistoric rock art possibly depicting the Tablets of the Law (The Ten Commandments)
- Directed by: Alon Bar; Eitan Bin Noun
- Written by: Alon Bar
- Produced by: Alon Bar; Eitan Bin Noun
- Narrated by: Will Setz
- Cinematography: Shlomo Avital
- Edited by: David Mandil
- Music by: Itai Galed
- Release date: May 26, 1992
- Running time: 52 minutes
- Country: Israel
- Languages: English; Hebrew

Exodus: A Journey to the Mountain of God (Hebrew: אקסודוס, מסע אל הר האלוהים) is a 1992 Israeli documentary film that follows an international group of archaeologists and travelers who go on a camel-back journey looking for the true location of the Biblical Mount Sinai. Arriving at Mount Karkom in the southern Negev Desert of Israel, they examine the archaeological findings discovered there by Italian archaeologist Prof. Emmanuel Anati. These findings are the basis for a theory claiming that the Biblical Mount Sinai is not Jabal Musa in Egypt, as some traditions claim, but Mount Karkom, and that this is where the Exodus took place. It also follows the expedition members' experiences and thoughts about religion, faith, human nature, and spirituality. Due to the remote desert terrain, the production equipment was hauled along the 160-kilometer (99 mi) expedition route by the crew and on camel-back.

The film was co-directed by Alon Bar and Eitan Bin Noun and written by Bar. It premiered at the Casablanca International Film Festival, Morocco on November 24, 1993, and was the first Israeli film ever to be shown in a film festival in an Arab country, and the first time that Israeli filmmakers officially took part in such an event.

== Awards ==
- 1995 Best Documentary Award at the MedFilm Festival, Italy
- 1993 Grand Prix Coronne D'Or at the Casablanca international film festival, Morocco
- 1993 Best Production Award by the Israeli Film Institute, Israel

== MedFilm Festival Jury Citation ==
BEST DOCUMENTARY AWARD goes to the film "Exodus - a journey to the mountain of God" by Alon Bar & Eitan Bin-Noun. The 52-minute-long documentary film tells about the journey of an expedition of scientists towards Mt. Sinai, on the path of the Biblical Exodus. It is a scientific and archeological trip, but, at the same time, it tells the story of a human spirit, of the passage from slavery in Egypt to freedom, and to the Promised Land. The young directors Alon Bar and Eitan Bin-Noun carried out the shooting with natural, emotional participation and great scientific preparation, producing a film that is not only centered on the archaeology of objects and rock art, but also on anthropological elements, which underlines the psychology and living habits of the desert people".
