= Shuroo =

- Film poster
- Directed by: Savi Gabizon
- Written by: Savi Gabizon
- Produced by: Jonathan Aroch
- Starring: Shmuel Edelman; Moshe Ferster; Sharon Hacohen; Moshe Ivgy; Ezra Kafri; Keren Mor
- Cinematography: Yoav Kosh
- Edited by: Tali Helter-Shenkar
- Music by: Lior Tevet
- Production company: Rosie Productions
- Release date: 1990
- Running time: 85 minutes
- Country: Israel
- Language: Hebrew

Shuroo is a 1990 Israeli comedy film directed by Savi Gabizon. It stars Moshe Ivgy, Moshe Ferster, and Keren Mor. The film is about a "small-time con man who becomes a guru". Critically acclaimed, it won the Ophir Award for Best Film and garnered numerous Best Actor awards for Ivgy at the Israeli Academy Awards and Haifa Film Festival. It was submitted by Israel to the Academy Awards.

== Plot ==
Asher Yeshuron (Moshe Ivgi), a charismatic but failed businessman who lacks integrity, is trying to promote the sales of his book, "To Drive Out the Crow." His life changes when he is a guest on a TV show, after being deemed by a cult to be a spiritual leader. Inside the cult, there are betrayals, secrets, and passions. The film unfolds the story of people seen as typical Tel Avivians of the eighties and nineties.

== Cast ==
- Shmuel Edelman
- Moshe Ferster as Moshe
- Sharon Hacohen
- Moshe Ivgy
- Ezra Kafri
- Keren Mor as Shimrit

== Reception ==
The film was submitted by Israel for the Academy Award for Best Foreign Language Film at the 63rd Academy Awards, but was not selected.

== See also ==
- List of submissions to the 63rd Academy Awards for Best Foreign Language Film
- List of Israeli submissions for the Academy Award for Best Foreign Language Film
