= Aaron Cohen's Debt =

- Directed by: Amalia Margolin
- Written by: Alon Bar
- Produced by: Galia Bador; Hila Tzabati
- Starring: Moshe Ivgy; Avital Abergel; Abu-Warda; Uri Avrahami
- Cinematography: Yoav Kosh
- Edited by: Zohar M. Sela
- Music by: Avner Kenner
- Distributed by: Israel Cable Programming (ICP)
- Release date: 4 January 1999
- Running time: 97 minutes
- Country: Israel
- Language: Hebrew

Aaron Cohen's Debt (Hebrew: חובו של אהרון כהן) is a non-linear, fact based 1999 Israeli film starring Moshe Ivgy as Aaron Cohen, a father abruptly taken into custody at his birthday party by police for one child-support payment which he does not believe he owes. Despite his frail health and his daughter's frantic attempts to bail him out, Aaron is forced to spend the night behind bars. Indifferent guards, an over-crowded cell and an infected ulcer thrust Aaron into a Kafkaesque nightmare. The following morning he is found dead and a hurried investigation hopelessly struggles to make sense of what happened.

The film was directed by Amalia Margolin and written by Alon Bar. Originally made for Israel Cable Programming, it was released on 4 January 1999 in Israel and later in the United States, Canada, France, Germany, and Australia. The drama was acquired by the French-German channel ARTE in 2020.

== Plot ==
Friends are celebrating Aaron Cohen's (Moshe Ivgi) birthday at a restaurant. Joining them is his daughter Maya (Avital Ebergel), who plays in a band on the accordion and accompanies her friend, singer Ami (Saar Badishi). Maya brings a cake, and Aaron blows out the candles. Suddenly, two police officers arrive and serve him with an arrest warrant for not paying 2,000 shekels in alimony to his ex-wife.

Aaron takes it calmly but is immediately handcuffed and taken to the police station in Beit Shemesh, and shortly after, he is transferred to the district detention facility at the Russian Compound in Jerusalem.

He is confident that he will be released soon, expecting his daughter to pay the amount, but the time stretches on. In Jerusalem, he is received by the officer in charge, David (Aryeh Moskona), officer Moti (Itzik Julie), and officer/medic Shmuel (Vladimir Friedman).

Aaron tells the officers that he suffers from a stomach ulcer and needs medication, "Losec," but they ignore him. He begins to experience stomach pain, confronts fellow prisoner Eli (Uri Avrahami), who hits him in the stomach and intensifies the pain. He vomits food and blood and asks medic Shmuel to take him to the emergency room, but his request is denied, as they claim "he doesn't have a fever."

The prisoners yell about the stench in the cell, and the officers decide to move Aaron to a solitary confinement cell, where he meets Tzafania, a schizophrenic prisoner who suffers from violent outbursts but has been given a tranquilizer. Tzafania wakes up and beats Aaron, and by early morning, officer David finds him lifeless.

A police investigator (Doron Tsabari) pressures a testimony from the Haredi prisoner Meir (Oded Menster), and the senior investigator (Yusuf Abu Varda) interrogates David about the incident, preparing to write a report, claiming that this is not the final word on the case.

== Awards ==
- 1999 Rockie Award for Best Made-For-TV Movie at the Banff World Television Festival, Canada
- 1999 Best Foreign Language Film nominee at the SXSW Film Festival, Austin, Texas, USA
