= Alta Weiss =

American physician and baseball player

- Pitcher
- Born: February 9, 1890; Berlin, Holmes County, Ohio, U.S.
- Died: February 12, 1964 (aged 74); Ragersville, Ohio, U.S.
- Threw: right

debut
- 1907, for the Vermilion Independents

Last appearance
- 1922, for the Weiss All Stars

Teams
- Vermilion Independents (1907); Weiss All Stars of Cleveland (1908–1922)

Alta Weiss Hisrich (February 9, 1890 – February 12, 1964), born Alta Weiss, was an American minor league baseball pitcher from Ohio. She subsequently became a physician.

== Early life, family and education ==
Born in 1890 in Berlin, Holmes County, Ohio, she was the daughter of Dr. George and Lucinda Zehnder Weiss. When she was five years old, the family moved to Ragersville, Ohio. Ragersville, in Tuscarawas County, is south-southeast of Sugarcreek, Ohio and east-northeast of Baltic.

After her baseball career, she graduated Starling Medical College with the class of 1914, the only female.

== Athletic career ==
She drew large crowds to exhibition games at minor league and major league venues in the US state of Ohio and Kentucky. She was a semiprofessional female baseball player who in 1907 played on the Vermilion Independents, an otherwise all-male team.

== Honors ==
A picture-story book for children Girl Wonder: A Baseball Story in Nine Innings, by Deborah Hopkinson, with illustrations by Terry Widener, was published in 2003 (ISBN 0-689-83300-8). The book was awarded a Jane Addams Children's Book Award for illustration in 2004.

On October 20, 2004, she was inducted into the Ragersville Hall of Fame. Her uniform was sent to the National Baseball Hall of Fame and Museum in Cooperstown, New York for exhibition in a Women's baseball exhibit that opened in 2005.

== Personal life ==
Weiss married John E. Hisrich in 1926; they separated in 1944. She died in 1964 in Ragersville, Ohio, just three days after her 74th birthday.

== See also ==
- Women in baseball
