= Nissan Nativ =

Israeli theater director

- ניסן נתיב
- Born: Nissan Notowicz; 5 November 1922; Munich, Germany
- Died: 20 April 2008 (aged 85); Tel Aviv, Israel
- Occupations: Director; Actor; Acting teacher
- Known for: Founding the Nissan Nativ Acting Studio
- Awards: Israel Prize for theatre (2008)

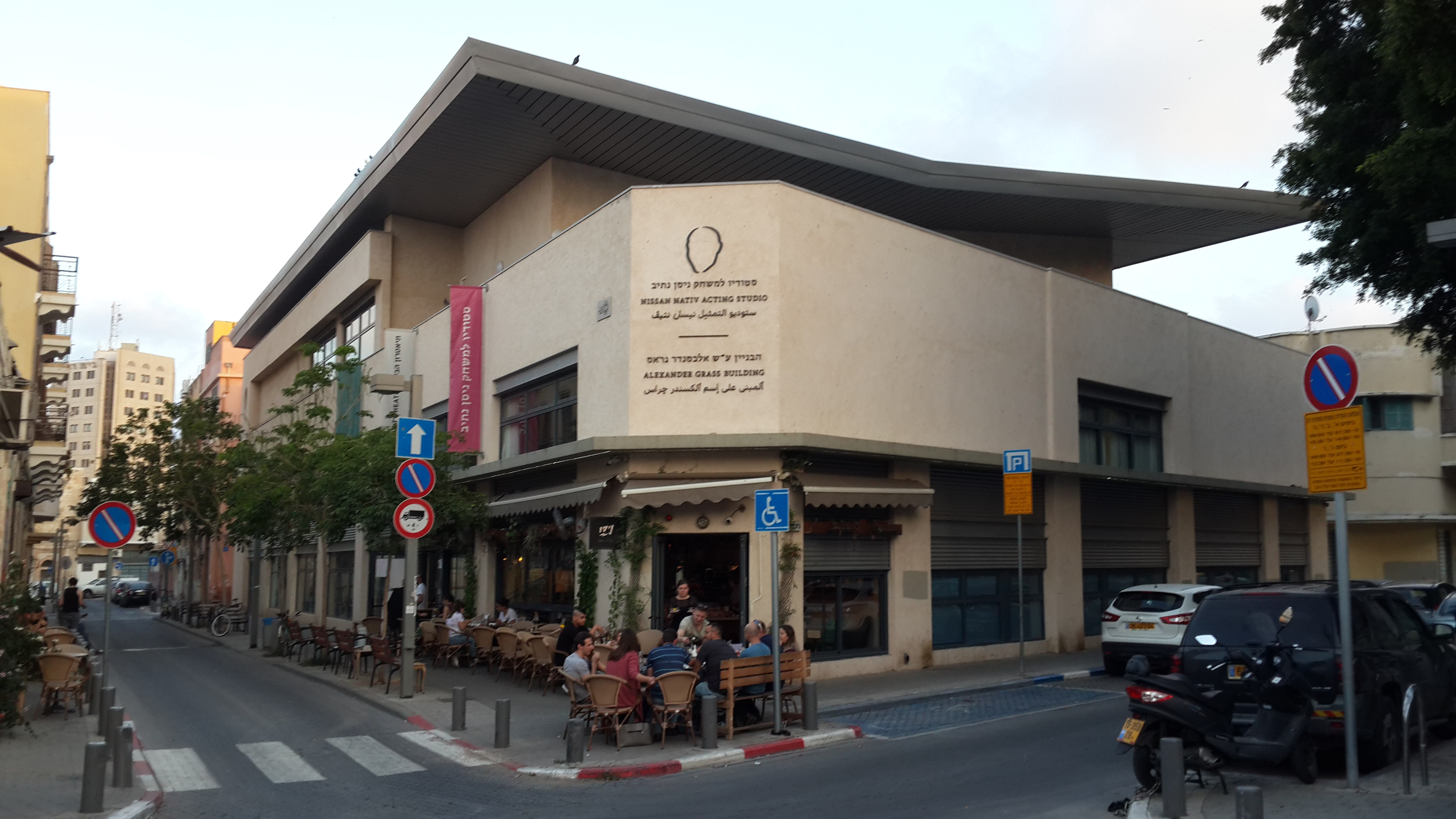
Nissan Nativ Acting Studio

Nissan Nativ (Hebrew: ניסן נתיב) (originally Notowicz; 5. November 1922 – 20 April 2008) was an influential Israeli director, actor and acting teacher.

== Life ==
Nissan Nativ was born 1922 (as Nissan Notowicz) in Munich. In many biographies he is listed as born in Amsterdam. Possibly Nissan Nativ himself was the source of this ambiguity. Nissan had two older brothers, Benno Notowitz (1918-1962) and Nathan Notowicz (1911–1968).

His family moved from Munich to Düsseldorf, then in the early 1930s to Amsterdam. Nissan emigrated without his family to the British Mandate in Palestine in 1937. In September 1943, his family was deported to the Westerbork transit camp in the Netherlands and in February 1944, forth to Bergen-Belsen concentration camp in Germany. The father and brothers survived the Nazi persecution.

Nativ joined the Jewish Brigade during World War II and served in the Armor Corps. He was a commander during the 1948 Arab-Israeli War. After the war, Nissan Nativ enrolled at the Hebrew University of Jerusalem.

Nissan Nativ moved from Israel to Paris where he studied mime. He worked as an Israeli theatre director and at Israel Radio when he returned from France.

He founded the Nissan Nativ Acting Studio in 1963. The renowned acting school holds classes in both Tel Aviv and Jerusalem. Many of Israel's best known actors, such as Keren Mor, Tiki Dayan and Moshe Ivgi are alumni of Nativ's school. Despite its success the school suffered from financial difficulties during the 1990s and 2000s, which nearly forced it to close.

The Israel Prize committee decided to confer the Israel Prize, for theatre, on Nativ in 2008 citing his contributions to Israeli theatre and culture. The committee stated in its opinion that "You cannot imagine Israeli theater without Nissan Nativ". It also cited Nativ's training of generations of Israeli actors and directors through his Nissan Nativ School of Acting.

Nativ died before he could receive the Israel Prize in person. He was found dead of an apparent heart attack in his apartment in Tel Aviv at the age of 86 on 20 April 2008.

== Filmography ==
Year	Title	Role	Notes
1979	Jesus	John's Disciple	Uncredited
1986	K'fafot		
2008	Eli & Ben	Grandfather	(final film role)

== See also ==
- List of Israel Prize recipients
