= Ilana Dayan =

Israeli journalist (born 1964)

Ilana Dayan-Orbach
- אילנה דיין-אורבך
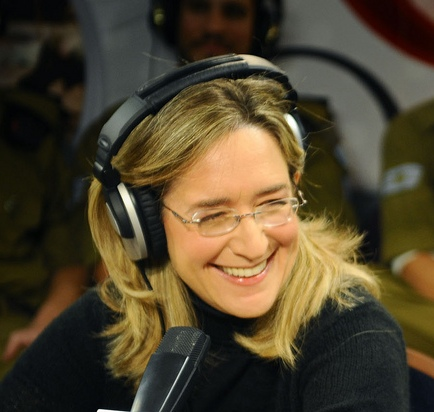
- Born: 8 May 1964 (age 62); Argentina
- Education: Tel Aviv University School of Law; Yale University
- Occupations: Investigative journalist, anchorwoman, and attorney
- Title: Host of Uvda ("Fact"), on the Israeli Channel 12
- Spouse: Harel
- Children: 3
- Relatives: Dani Dayan (cousin)

Ilana Dayan-Orbach (Hebrew: אילנה דיין-אורבך; born 8 May 1964) is an Israeli investigative journalist, anchorwoman, and attorney. She is best known as host of the investigative television program Uvda ("Fact") on the Israeli Channel 12. She is married to Harel Orbach; the couple has three children.

== Biography ==
Dayan was born in Argentina in 1964 and immigrated to Israel with her family at age six in 1970, and settled in the Yad Eliyahu neighborhood in Tel Aviv. Her great-grandfather, Eliyahu Dayan (1868–1925) was the uncle of Shmuel Dayan, an Israeli politician who was the father of Moshe Dayan.

She was drafted to the IDF during the First Lebanon War, and served as producer, editor, and correspondent for the Israel Army Radio. She was the first woman correspondent in the station's history. Near the end of her regular service she began presenting the morning program with Yitzhak Ben Ner, and later with Micha Friedman. At the age of 23 became the first woman on the presenting staff of Erev Hadash ("New Evening") on the Israeli Educational Television.

Meanwhile, she attended the Tel Aviv University school of law, and after her internship she traveled to the United States to receive a Doctor of the Science of Law (J.S.D.) degree from Yale University. During her studies there, she also wrote a bi-weekly column for Yedioth Ahronoth. Upon her return to Israel, she began teaching courses in constitutional law in the Tel Aviv University faculty of law, where she still teaches as a visiting lecturer. She has expressed her support for Supreme Court of Israel President Dorit Beinisch and denounced Justice Minister Daniel Friedmann's attempts to limit the Supreme Court's judicial review.

In November 1993, when the Israeli Channel 2 was launched, she started hosting her television program, Uvda for Telad. It is the only program still being broadcast on that channel for such a long time. In 2005, Uvda was purchased by Keshet, after Telad's concession was over. She also presents a morning program on current affairs for the Israel Army Radio.

In 2005, she was voted number 106 in Yedioth Ahronoth's list of 200 Greatest Israelis, and was chosen the most influential woman in Israeli culture in the 2008 "Woman" festival in Holon.

== Controversies ==
=== The Captain R. affair ===
In 2005, Uvda broadcast a documentary on the killing of 13-year-old Iman Darweesh Al Hams by IDF troops in the Gaza Strip. According to her investigation, the commanding officer, identified as Captain R., verified her death by shooting her from point-blank range. Captain R. was eventually acquitted by a court martial. Following his acquittal, he filed a lawsuit against her and channel 2 for libel. The Jerusalem District Court found Dayan liable for libel and awarded Captain R. NIS 300,000 in damages. However, the Jerusalem District Court has denied Captain R.'s demand that Dayan reveal her sources.

Dayan filed an appeal to the Supreme Court of Israel, which then reversed the ruling of the District Court. The Supreme Court stated that the documentary programme did cause damage to captain R., but that Dayan was protected by the Substantial truth doctrine. The court stated that, at the time of the broadcast, the details on the programme could be known to be sufficiently reliable to a "reasonable journalist", and the court also clarified the concept of "Truth at the Time", pertaining to the case.

The justices dismissed the demand by the plaintiff for an apology, but they charged NIS 100,000 of compensation to be paid by Telad, the TV production company for Channel 2, in lieu of the programme trailers, which were found to be libel. In September 2014, an extended panel of nine judges, sitting as an Additional Hearing at the request of captain R., ruled to sustain the previous judgment, and further, to extend the basis for Acquittal from "Truth at the Time" to "In Good faith".

An investigation by Israel Harel reported in the Israeli newspaper Haaretz found that video footage aired by Dayan on her program on Channel 2 showing soldiers dancing in delight that she attributed to the event was actually footage from a Rosh Hashana (Jewish New Year) party. Similarly, photos of soldiers celebrating after firing their weapons and attributed to Captain R. and his platoon were actually taken of another platoon after target practice in a non-combat situation.

=== The Brothers Parinyan affair ===
In April 2005 Uvda suggested that Yoram Levy, a senior police officer, was effectively representing the interests of the Parinyan crime family within the police, after criminal Pinhas Buhbut was murdered by a cop. Following the program, a police investigation found Levy not guilty and closed the case, but did write down a disciplinary offense for Levy for using the brothers as sources. Near the end of the year, the Zeiler Commission appointed to investigate the police proceedings during the affair. according to Justice Vardi Zeiler, "if not for Ilana Dayan and her television program, this case wouldn't have been revived and no one would have known what happened. These are things that can be said with absolute certainty". The commission report eventually led to the resignation of police commissioner Moshe Karadi and the discharge of Levy. Levy filed a lawsuit for libel against Dayan, arguing that her report exaggerated his part in the affair.

=== The Moshe Katsav affair ===
In March 2007, Uvda was accused of portraying the suspended President of Israel, Moshe Katsav, as fraternizing with criminals and systematically sexually assaulting female employees and then intimidating them into silence on the eve of his hearing with Attorney General Menachem Mazuz by Katsav's attorneys, who said they would file a slander suit against Dayan.
