= Emmanuel Anati =

Italian archaeologist (born 1930)

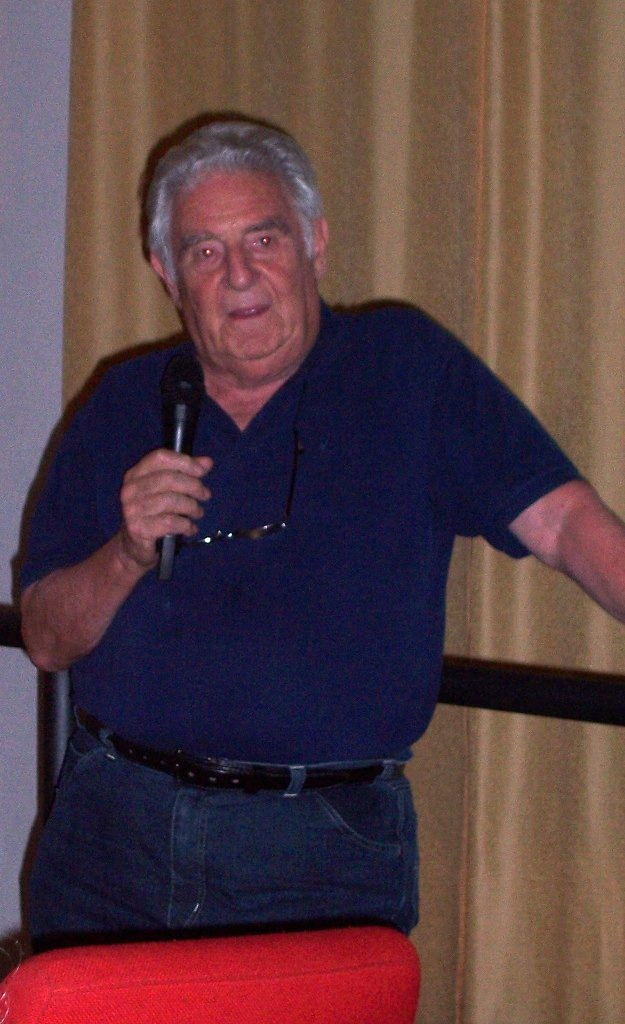
Emmanuel Anati

Emmanuel Anati (Florence, 14 May 1930) is an Italian archaeologist.

== Biography ==
Emmanuel Anati was born in Florence in 1930 to Ugo and Elsa Castelnuovo, a family of Jewish origin.

In 1948, he got the scientific maturity in the "Righi" institute of Rome. He then moved to Jerusalem, where he graduated in archaeology from Hebrew University in 1952. In 1959, Anati specialized in anthropology and social sciences at Harvard University. In 1960, he earned a Ph.D. in Literature at the Sorbonne in Paris.

Anati has performed excavations and archaeological research in Israel (especially in the Negev desert), Spain, France, and other European countries. Based on the results of his discoveries in the Sinai Peninsula, Anati has become a supporter of the thesis that the Biblical Mount Sinai is not to be identified as Gebel Katherina, but as Har Karkom instead; he also believes that the Exodus should be placed between the 24th and the 21st century BCE, instead of the traditional date between 17th and 13th century BCE.

This identification has not gained acceptance: Israel Finkelstein (who denies the historicity of the Exodus) described Anati's methods as "an anachronistic vestige from the 19th century", while James K. Hoffmeier (who supports the historicity of the Exodus, but in the traditional 13th century date) has stressed that "the type of Early Bronze Age cultic installations discovered at Har Karkom have also been found in significant numbers in the southern desert, Negev, and Sinai—so Anati's finds are not unique".

In the 1950s, Anati explored Val Camonica, whose rock carvings are one of the largest sites for rock art in Europe. In 1964 he founded the Centro Camuno di Studi Preistorici (CCSP) in Capo di Ponte, in order to study the prehistoric and tribal art and contribute to the enhancement of this cultural heritage.

In 1962, he married Ariela Fradkin.

== Works ==
- Palestine Before the Hebrews: A History, From the Earliest Arrival of Man to the Conquest of Canaan, 1963
- Mountain of God, 1986
- Camonica Valley: A Depiction of Village in the Alps From Neolithic Times to the Birth of Christ as Revealed by Thousands of Newly found Rock Carvings, 1961
- Camonica Valley, 1961
- Evolution and style in Camunian rock art: An inquiry into the formation of European civilization, 1976
- Les mystères du mont Sinaï, 2000

== See also ==
- Har Karkom
- Rock Drawings in Valcamonica
- Exodus: A Journey to the Mountain of God
