= Mount Karkom =

Mountain in Israel

Coordinates: 30°17′N 34°45′E

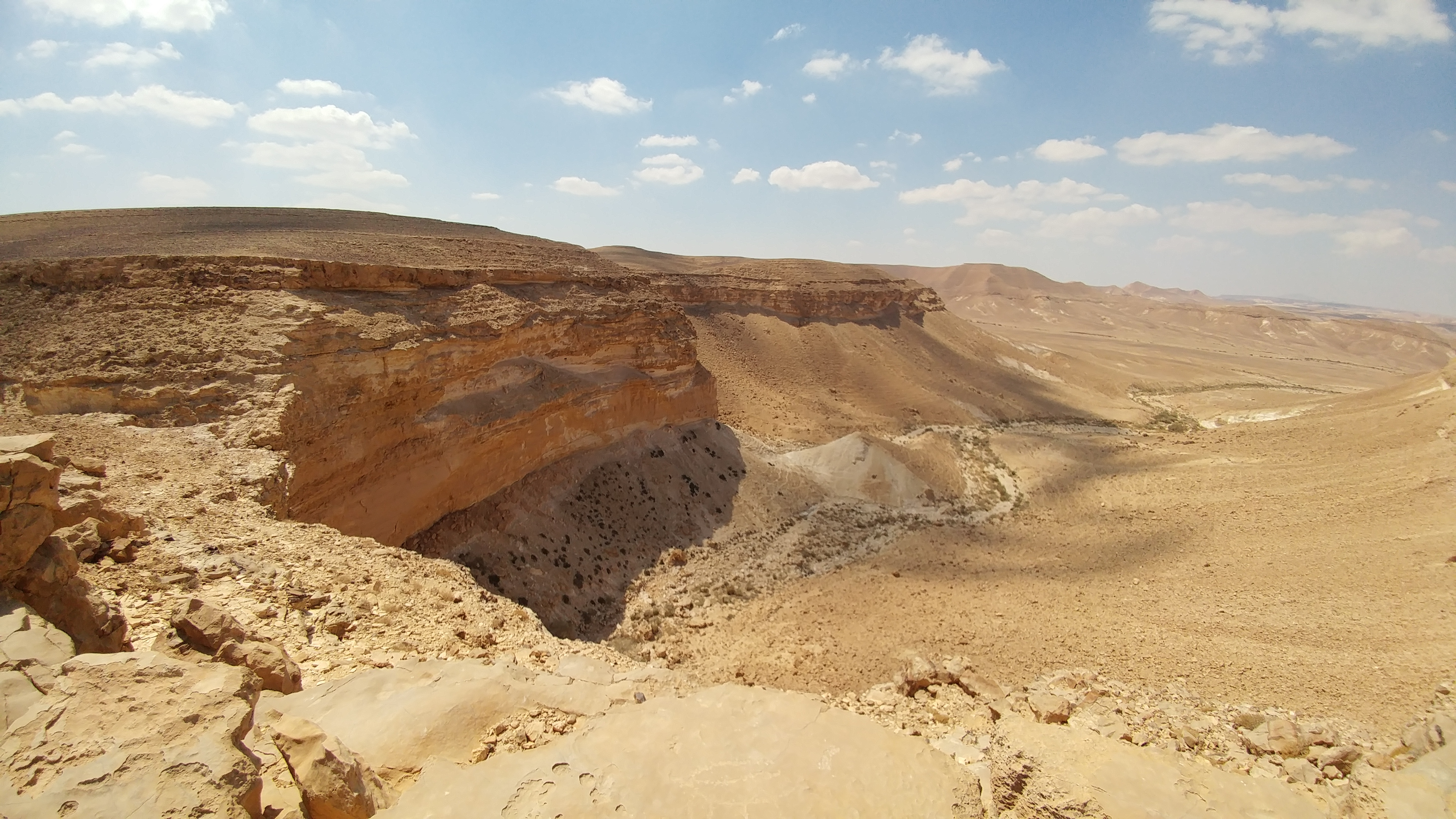
Site of Karkom winterbourne waterfall (dry state) on top of Har Karkom ridge, Israel, showing saffron-coloured rock strata

Mount Karkom, also Har Karkom (Hebrew: הר כרכום "Mountain of Saffron"), from Arabic Jabal Karkoum (also Jabal Ideid), is a mountain in the southwest Negev desert in Israel, halfway between Petra and Kadesh Barnea.

It is 847 meter (2,780 feet) high.

== Identification with Mount Sinai ==
Some scholars have speculated the possibility of Har Karkom being the biblical Mount Sinai. They suggest that the Israelites travelled across the Sinai Peninsula towards Petra in a fairly straight line. Following this theory, Emmanuel Anati excavated at the mountain, and discovered that it was a major Paleolithic cult centre, with the surrounding plateau covered with shrines, altars, stone circles, stone pillars, and over 40,000 rock engravings. Although Anati, on the basis of his findings, advocates the identification of Har Karkom with Mount Sinai, the peak of religious activity at the site may date to 2350-2000 BCE, and it appears to have been abandoned perhaps between 1950 and 1000 BCE. The Exodus is sometimes dated between 1600-1200 BCE. However, there is no archaeological evidence supported by scholars to maintain a date of 1600-1200 BCE. Anati instead places the Exodus, based on other archaeological evidence, between 2350 and 2000 BCE.

James K. Hoffmeier wrote:

Scholars have reacted with either indifference or antagonism to Anati's revisionist theory. Revisionist chronologies are not new but have been roundly rejected by trained historians, biblical scholars, and archaeologists. One early critic was Israel Finkelstein, who penned a devastating review. He rightly rejects Anati's conclusions, because the type of Early Bronze Age cultic installations discovered at Har Karkom have also been found in significant numbers in the southern desert, Negev, and Sinai—so Anati's finds are not unique, and Finkelstein is appalled by Anati's chronological revisionism. He also finds the location so close to Kadesh and the Negev problematic, especially since a few years earlier he had argued for a south Sinai location for the mountain of God on the basis of ecological factors. Another problem for Anati’s theory is that if this mountain marks the place where Israel received the tablets with the ten commandments, in what language would they have been written between 2200 and 2000 B.C.? The Canaanite alphabetic script, from which the Hebrew script was borrowed, was still developing around 1800 B.C.

== See also ==
- Exodus: A Journey to the Mountain of God, 1992 documentary
- Emmanuel Anati, Italian archaeologist
