= Ratzim Ladira =

- רצים לדירה
- Presented by: Avi Kushnir
- No. of seasons: 2

Original release
- Network: Telad
- Release: 2004 – 2005

Ratzim Ladira ([We] Run to [the] Apartment/Home") is a reality television program aired in Israel, modeled on the American show The Amazing Race.

The show is staged as a series of contests, with the slowest competitor eliminated after each iteration. The winner of the show is awarded an apartment.
