= Alon Bar =

Israeli-American filmmaker

- אַלּוֹן בָּר
- Born: April 2, 1966 (age 60); Kibbutz Reshafim, Israel
- Education: Tel Aviv University (BA); American Film Institute (MFA)
- Occupations: Filmmaker screenwriter, producer, director, author
- Years active: 1991–present
- Spouse: Sigal Meyuhas (m. 1999)
- Children: 2

Alon Bar (Hebrew: אַלּוֹן בָּר; born April 2, 1966) is an Israeli-American filmmaker.

He wrote the feature film "Aaron Cohen's Debt," which he later adapted to the award-winning American screenplay "Under Arrest".

He directed, wrote and produced the award-winning documentary film Exodus: A journey to the mountain of God, which was the first Israeli film ever to participate a film festival in an Arab country.

He is a graduate of the American Film Institute Conservatory with a Master Degree in screenwriting. He holds a Bachelor Degree in film and television from Tel Aviv University. He participated in SOURCES 2, the screenwriting laboratory of the European Union's Media II initiative and taught documentary filmmaking at UCLA extension.

In 1993, while still a student in Tel Aviv, he became the protégé of director David Perlov, a laureate of the Israel Prize. Following their first project, "Tel Katzir 1993," he collaborated as a researcher, writer and assistant director on four of Perlov's films.

In 1994, he produced "Video Dance Premiers 1994," a collection of videodance made for the Batsheva Dance Company.

In the early 2000s, he collaborated on the un-produced screenplay "Whiteout" with Carl Gottlieb, and wrote the un-produced screenplay "Plastic Bridges," through improvisations with a group of actors including Enrico Colantoni and Amy Pietz.

Since 2006, he is the president and co-owner with Nancy Sexton of 4881 LLC, a multifaceted platform, serving as a launch pad for creativity. Amongst others, the collaboration between Bar and Sexton created the award-winning screenplay "Type O," and the screenplays to the romantic comedy "Bonus Day" and the animation feature "Ruby", both currently (2013) in pre-production.

In 2011, he co-authored with Nancy Sexton the book Write Your Film, a screenwriting manual exploring the two unique writing system and collaboration.

In 2018, he co-wrote with Nancy Sexton the PixL TV feature film "The Wedding Do Over", a romantic comedy starring Nicole Gale Anderson and Parker Young that originally aired on Valentine's Day, Feb. 3, 2018.

== Films in production ==
- Ruby (working title) (2013), Producer Lumiq Studios, Turin, Italy

== Selected films ==
- The Wedding Do Over (2018) Director W.D. Hogan
- Aaron Cohen's Debt (1999) Director Amalia Margolin
- Video Dance Premiers 1994 (1994) for Batsheva Dance Company
- Tel Katzir 1993 (1993) Director David Perlov
- Exodus - A journey to the mountain of God (1992) Directors Eitan Bin-Noun & Alon Bar
- For The Sake of Appearance (1991) Director Eitan Bin-Noun

== Awards ==
- 2013 Quarterfinalist at the ScreenCraft Comedy Script Contest, USA, for "Sweethearts"
- 2011 Silver Award at the California Film Awards, USA, for "Under Arrest" the American adaptation of "Aaron Cohen's Debt"
- 2010 Quarterfinalist at the Scriptapalooza screenwriting competition, USA, for "Type O"
- 1999 Rockie Award for Best Made-For-TV Movie at the Banff World Television Festival, Canada, for "Aaron Cohen's Debt"
- 1999 Best Foreign Language Film nominee at the SXSW Film Festival, Austin, Texas, USA, for "Aaron Cohen's Debt"
- 1995 Best Documentary Award at the MedFilm Festival, Italy, for Exodus: A journey to the mountain of God
- 1993 Grand Prix Coronne D'Or at the Casablanca international film festival, Morocco, for Exodus: A journey to the mountain of God
- 1993 Best Production Award by the Israeli Film Institute, Israel, for Exodus: A journey to the mountain of God
- 1992 Grand Jury Award at the Algarve International Film Festival, Portugal, "For the Sake of Appearance"
- 1992 Silver Plaque Award at the Chicago International Film Festival, United States, "For the Sake of Appearance"
- 1992 The President Award at the Mons International Film Festival, Belgium, "For the Sake of Appearance"
