= Ragersville, Ohio =

Unincorporated community in Ohio, U.S.

Coordinates: 40°27′09″N 81°37′34″W

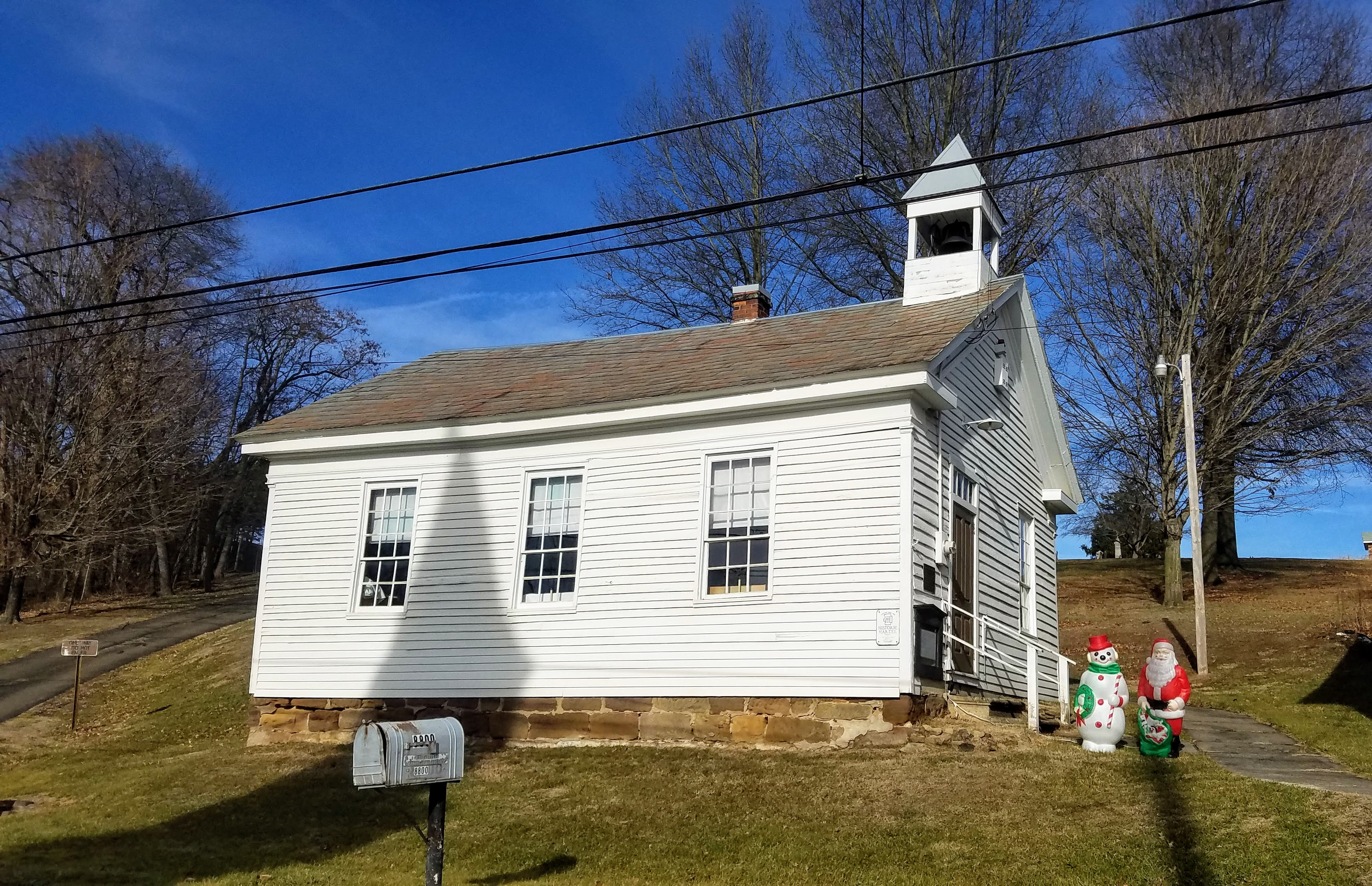
Rangersville School

Ragersville is an unincorporated community in Tuscarawas County, in the U.S. state of Ohio.

== History ==
Ragersville was platted in 1830 by Conrad Rager, and named for him. A post office called Ragersville was established in 1880, and remained in operation until 1955.

== Notable people ==
- Nancy Sexton, filmmaker
- Alta Weiss, professional baseball player
