= Nancy Sexton =

American singer-songwriter

- Born: July 8, 1969 (age 57); Ragersville, Ohio
- Occupations: Screenwriter, producer, author, Voice Over Artist, Singer, songwriter, model, Fitness Instructor
- Spouse: Tim J Sexton (m. 2009) Widowed

Nancy Sexton (born July 8, 1969 in Ragersville, Ohio), is an American filmmaker, singer-songwriter, model and TV personality.

== Life ==
In 2005, she started on FitTV's show, "The Gym".

Her song, "It's a real World", produced by DJ Molella reached number one on the Italian Hit Parade, and led to her 1997 performance in Festivalbar.

Since 2006, she is the CEO and co-owner with Alon Bar of 4881 LLC, a multifaceted platform. Sexton and Alon Bar created the award-winning screenplay Type O, which was in pre-production as of 2017. Sexton also co-created the animation feature Ruby, produced by Lumiq Studios, Turin, Italy and in pre-production as of 2024.

In 2011, she co-authored with Alon Bar the book Write Your Film, a screenwriting manual.

== Awards ==
- 2010 Quarterfinalist at the Scriptapalooza screenwriting competition, USA, for Type O
- 2013 Quarterfinalist at the ScreenCraft Comedy Script Contest, USA, for Sweethearts
