= Amir Shurush =

Arab-Israeli actor and comedian (born 1984)

- أمير شوروش
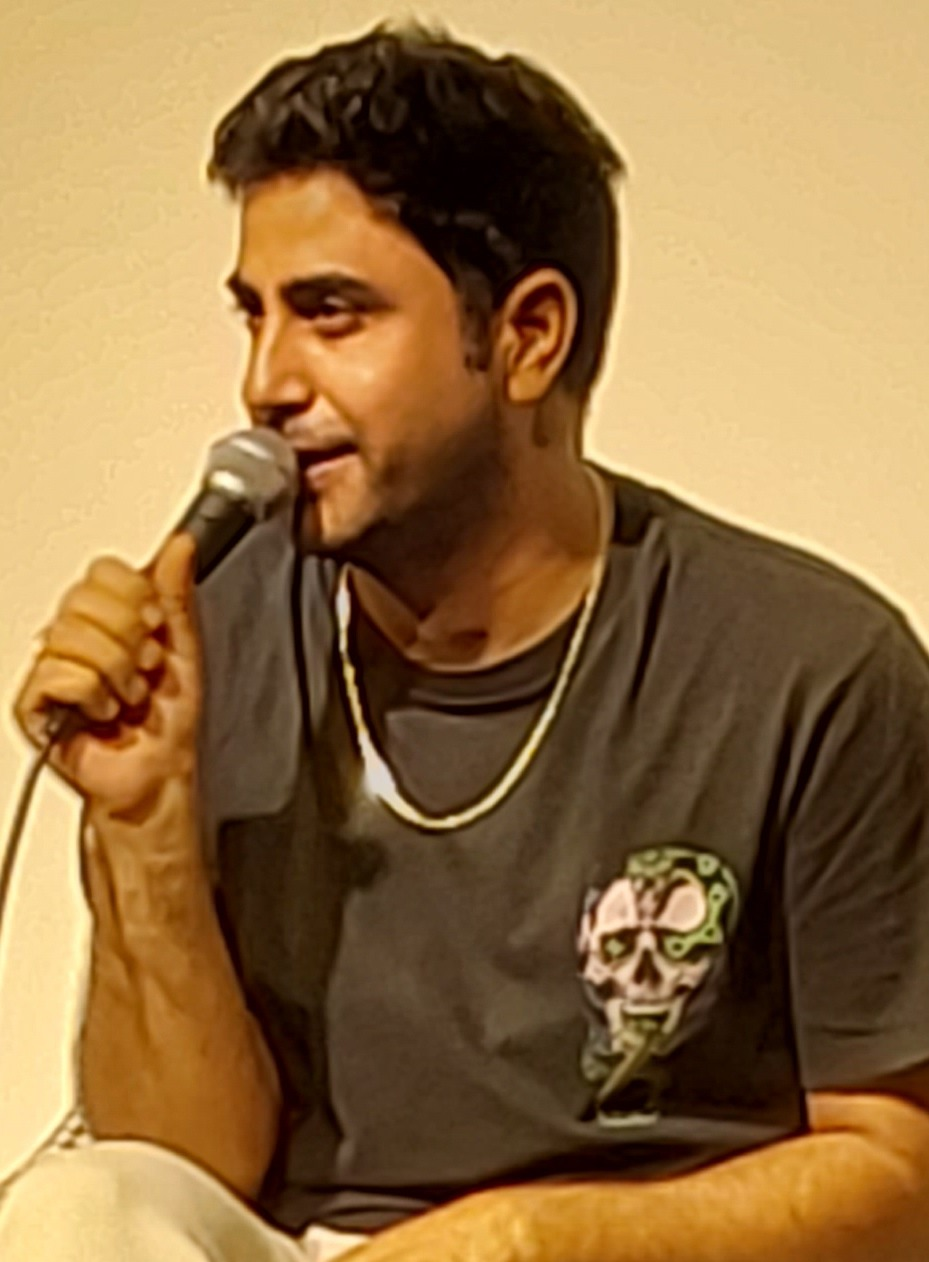
- Shurush in 2023
- Born: 9 July 1984 (age 41); Eilat, Israel
- Occupations: Actor, comedian
- Spouse: Tali Ben-Yosef
- Children: 2
- Awards: Awards of the Israeli Television Academy (Best Lead Actor in a Comedy Series)

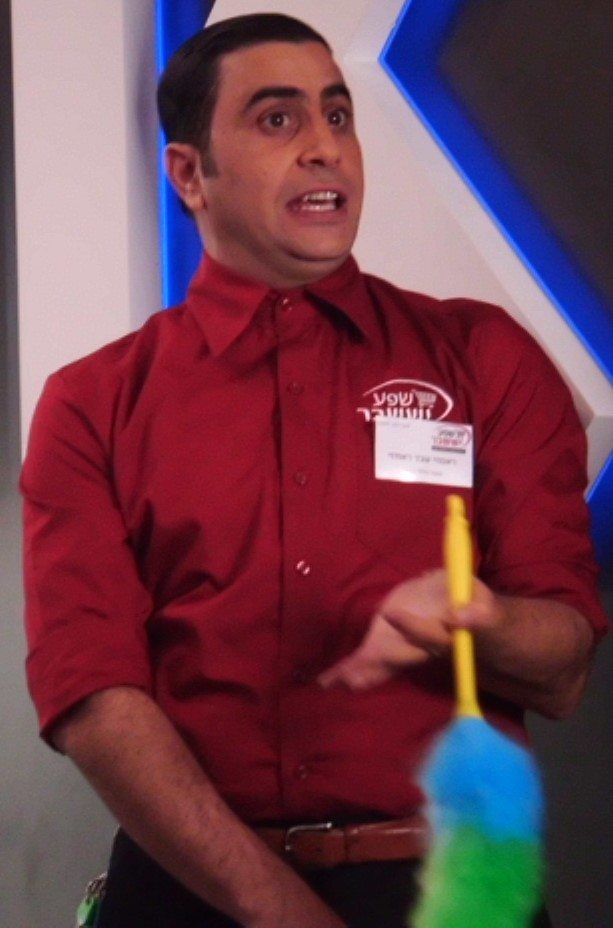
Shurush portrating Ramzi Abd Ramzi in 2024

Amir Shurush (Arabic: أمير شوروش, Hebrew: אמיר שורוש; born 9 July 1984) is an Arab-Israeli actor and comedian.

In 2021, he won the Best Actor – Comedy Series award at the Awards of the Israeli Television Academy.

He appeared in the Israeli comedy series Checkout, which aired on Kan 11, and offered satirical impressions of Mansour Abbas, Ayman Odeh and Youseph Haddad in the Israeli sketch comedy show Eretz Nehederet which airs on Channel 12 (Israel).

== Early life ==
Shurush was raised in Eilat, Israel, and is the son of Anwar Shurush, an Israeli Arab-Christian, and of Jewish-Israeli Meira Shurush. He grew up in a major Israeli Hebrew city, and despite his Arabic accent – Shurush disclaimed fluency in the latter. Shurush mentioned that Arab cuisine is his favorite.

He served in the Israel Defense Forces under the Kfir Brigade. Following his military service, Shurush enrolled in the Beit Zvi Performing Arts and Theater School in Ramat Gan, Israel; from which he graduated in 2009.

Before his professional career, Shurush worked as a waiter, bartender, cook, and sailor on a cruise ship.

== Career ==
During his career in theater, Shurush performed in the Beit Lessin Theater, Orna Porat Children's Theater, and in the Israeli musical Billy Schwartz at the Haifa Theatre.

In 2010, he played in the satirical drama series 15 Minutes. He performed the role of Amir Dirar, a fictional Arab contestant in a reality show.

In 2011, he played the role of Rifat Dahlak, in the series Downtown Precinct.

In 2014, he played in the drama series Temporarily Dead.

In 2018, he played in the drama series The Psychologist, and the comedy series Checkout.

Since 2020, Shurush has participated in the Israeli sketch comedy show Eretz Nehederet, imitating the likes of:

- Ayman Odeh (chairman of Hadash and the Arab Joint List)
- Mansour Abbas (chairman of the United Arab List)
- Ali Salam (Arab-Israeli mayor of Nazareth)
- Furat Nassar (N12's Arab sector correspondent)

== See also ==
- Lucy Ayoub
- Lucy Aharish
- Nasrin Kadri
- Mira Awad
- Huda Naccache
- Norman Issa
- Yousef "Joe" Sweid

Preceded by Assi Cohen	Awards of the Israeli Television Academy; Best Actor (Comedy Series); 2021	Succeeded by Neveh Tzur
