= Foul Gesture =

- Release date: 2007
- Country: Israel

Foul Gesture (Hebrew: תנועה מגונה, romanized: Tnu'a Meguna) is an Israeli drama film directed by Tzahi Grad. The plot is about seeking justice against a person with powerful connections. It was officially released in 2007.

== Plot ==
Michael Kleinhaus is parked in a car in the street for his wife Tamar to take her seat. She is slow, the man behind called Dreyfus impatiently honks, and Tamar gives him "the finger". Angered, Dreyfus rips Michael's car door off. Michael tries to seek justice, but it turns out that Dreyfus is a former Shin Bet official, now a shady businessman with connections in the police.

== Discussion ==
The idea of the plot (a quest for justice) is based on the German novel Michael Kohlhaas, with reviewers noticing various hints at this, starting with the name of the protagonist.

Film critics note that it is a low-budget (2,178,000 NIS) but good film, however not without problems.

== Awards ==
- 2006: Haifa International Film Festival: Best Israeli Film Award
