= Avital Abergel =

Israeli film and TV actress

- אביטל אברג'יל
- Born: 10 June 1977 (age 48); Ramat Gan, Israel
- Occupation: Actress

Avital Abergel (Hebrew: אביטל אברג'יל; born June 10, 1977) is an Israeli film and TV actress. Abergel has appeared in such (Israeli) films as "Aaron Cohen's Debt" (Hebrew: חובו של אהרון כהן) and "Something Sweet" (Hebrew: משהו מתוק). Likewise, Abergel is also a successful TV actress appearing in a number of Israeli Television series, such as: "The Good Guys", "The Other Woman", "Intensive care unit" and "Deep Blue".

Abergel is primarily known for acting as the character "Elinor Malchi" in the Children's TV Series "Octave" which is televised on the Children's Channel (Israel) (Hebrew: ערוץ הילדים).

In 2005, she appeared in the Teen movie: "You Are (betrothed to me)" (Hebrew: השמיניה) with the director of the Israeli film "Piza'at Lichtman"

In 2017/8 she had a part in the film The Children Act.
