= Hahamishia Hakamerit =

- Also known as: Chamber Quintet
- Written by: Modi Bar-On, Maxim Ben Zakai, Pazit Daniel, Joe El Dror, Shmuel Hasfari, Etgar Keret, Yoni Lahav, Doron Nesher, Noam Slonim, Asaf Tzipor, Uzi Weil
- Directed by: Eitan Tzur
- Starring: Shai Avivi; Rami Heuberger; Keren Mor; Dov Navon; Menashe Noy
- Country of origin: Israel
- Original language: Hebrew
- No. of seasons: 5
- No. of episodes: 75

Production
- Running time: 26 minutes per episode

Original release
- Network: Channel 2 Channel 1 Bip
- Release: 1993 – 1997

Hahamishia Hakamerit (Hebrew: החמישייה הקאמרית, lit. 'The Chamber Quintet') was a weekly Israeli satirical sketch comedy television program, characterized by a skeptical, controversial type of humor. It was created by Asaf Tzipor, who was also the main writer of the show, and Eitan Tzur, who directed the entire run of the show. Hahamishia Hakamerit was broadcast on Israeli Channel 2 and Channel 1 in the years 1993-1997. Later on, reruns of the show were broadcast on the cable channel Bip.

The show's often surreal skits were characterized by a satirical point of view which did not spare the audience sensitive subjects such as politics, national security, the Holocaust and sex.

One such skit, titled "Yigal Amir's monologue", written by Uzi Weil, showed Yigal Amir, the assassin of Yitzhak Rabin in a prison cell talk about how in 20 years he will be granted clemency by the government due to the "times being rough for Israeli society" and also mentioned him causing Eitan Haber to have a heart attack after he called him a "murderer!". The skit has remained polarising, and was only filmed a week after Rabin’s assassination, and aired only two years after it in 1997.

In 2010 Hahamishia Hakamerit received the title of the Honorary Fellow of the Sam Spiegel Film and Television School.

== Cast ==
- Shai Avivi (שי אביבי) Actor
- Rami Heuberger (רמי הויברגר) Actor
- Keren Mor (קרן מור) Actor
- Dov Navon (דב נבון) Actor
- Menashe Noy (מנשה נוי) Actor
- Eitan Tzur Director
