= Telad =

Israeli production and broadcast company

- Formerly: Idan
- Type: Private
- Industry: Television production
- Predecessor: Idan
- Founded: 1960s (Idan), 1973 (Telad)
- Founder: Uzi Peled
- Headquarters: Jerusalem, Israel
- Area served: Israel
- Key people: Ronda Atar (CEO), Uzi Peled (Former CEO), Dorit Inbar (Former CEO)
- Products: TV series, commercials, broadcast events, channel broadcasting (former)
- Services: Television production, broadcasting (former)
- Parent: NMC United Entertainment

Telad is an Israeli production company. The company is mostly known for being one of the three concessionaires who ran the Israeli commercial television channel Channel 2 between the years 1993–2005. It currently operates as a subsidiary of NMC United Entertainment.

== History ==
The company was founded in the 1960s by Uzi Peled as a small production company in Jerusalem named "Idan" and provided services to the Israeli Channel 1 and to TV stations worldwide. "Idan" was reestablished in 1973 into "Telad" as part of a joint establishment with the Israeli investment firm Israel Discount Bank. Telad initially worked with Channel 1 and the experimental Channel 2.

In May of 1993, Telad was granted a franchise to operate the newly established Channel 2 and was the first of the three concessionaires to broadcast the first transmissions on the opening day of Channel 2 on 4 November 1993. Later on, during the late 1990s, Telad acquired exclusive broadcasting rights of TV channels broadcast on the satellite TV and cable TV – among them The History Channel and E! channel in July 2000, the MGM channel in July 2001, and the Biography Channel in October of 2005. Telad lost the concessionaires broadcasting bid for Channel 2 which was held in 2005, and therefore, on the night of 29 October 2005 ceased to broadcast on Channel 2. In 2008 Telad launched the SHE channel which was aimed for female viewers. Telad was also the owner of the sports website ONE before selling it to the Kayden Media Group in 2005.

Until 2004 Uzi Peled was Telad's CEO. He was then replaced by Dorit Inbar. Today the company's CEO is Ronda Atar.

Telad has broad production unit and has produced a large number of TV programs: over 10,000 hours of broadcast (all genres) and specialization in the production of commercials and hundreds of thousands large-scale broadcast events such as concerts, award ceremonies, events and fundraising campaigns. Telad has provided services in large events to leading international TV networks and has produced content jointly with broadcasting companies such as NBC, ABC, CBS, PBS, BBC, Arte, NDR, ZDF, MGM and A&E.

Telad has produced several prominent Israeli TV series including “Hahamishia Hakamerit“, “Ha-Comedy Store”, “Chartzufim” and "Florentine".

== Prominent productions of Telad ==
=== Entertainment Programs ===
- Hahamishia Hakamerit (1993–1997)
- Ha-Comedy Store (1994–1997)
- Layla Gov ( 1994–1998)
- Chartzufim (1996–2000)
- Tonight with Eli Yatzpan (1996–1999)
- Ktsarim (2004–2009):

=== TV Series ===
- Ramat Aviv Gimel (1995–2000)
- Florentine (1997–1998)
- Zinzana (1999–2005)
- Ha-Chaim Ze Lo Hacol (2001–2004)
- Ahava Me'ever Lapina (2003–2005)
- Ratzim Ladira (2004-2005)

=== Reality shows, Contest shows and Game shows ===
- Bingo (1994–1996)
- The Price Is Right (1994–1996)
- The Fortress (1998–1999)

=== Investigative shows ===
- Uvda (1993–2005)

=== Children and Youth shows ===
- Tush Tush (1996)
- Shoko Telad (1997–2002)
- Barney & Friends (1997–1999)
- Michal's Carnival (1995–1996)
- Disney Time (1993–2002)
