= Rami Heuberger =

Israeli actor (1963–2025)

- רמי הויברגר
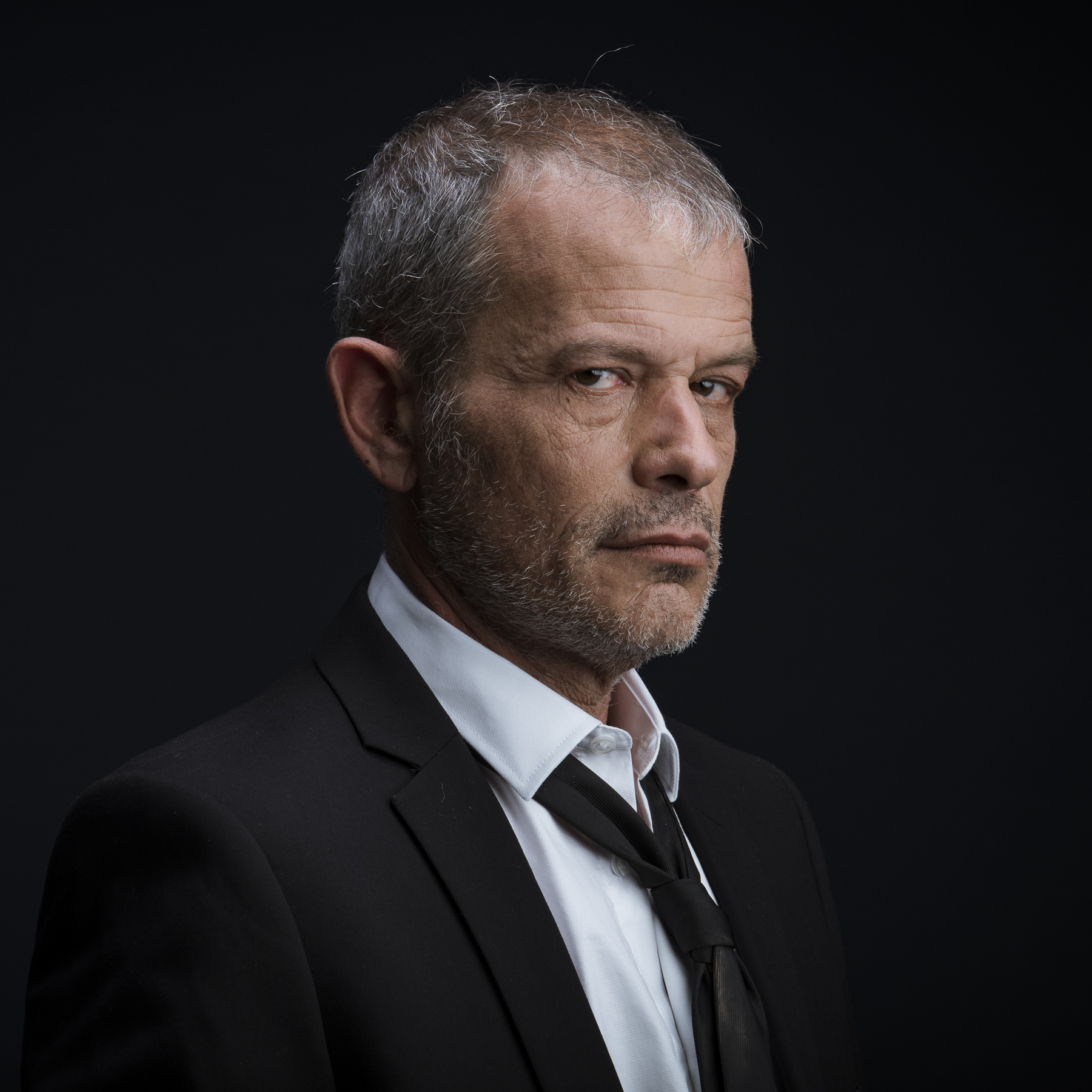
- Heuberger in 2020
- Born: 12 October 1963; Tel Aviv, Israel
- Died: 28 August 2025 (aged 61); Tel Aviv, Israel
- Occupations: Actor; comedian; theatre director
- Years active: 1988–2025
- Children: 4

Rami Heuberger (Hebrew: רמי הויברגר; 12 October 1963 – 28 August 2025) was an Israeli actor, comedian and theatre director.

== Life and career ==
Heuberger was born and raised in Tel Aviv. After graduating from Ironi Alef High School, he did his service in the Israel Defense Forces in the Military Police Corps. After being discharged, Heuberger studied acting at Nissan Nativ's acting studio in Tel Aviv. At the end of his studies, Heuberger participated in several theater plays, among them Macbeth, One Flew Over the Cuckoo's Nest, Hamlet, Waiting for Godot, Le Bourgeois gentilhomme, and Black Box. In 2007 came the stage play Scenes from the Marriage premiered, which Heuberger directed and acted in. During the same year, Heuberger was in the cast of the stage play Anna Karenina alongside Evgenia Dodina, Alex Ansky, and Yuval Segal. In 2008, the second stage play directed by Heuberger premiered - Eling, which featured Dov Navon, Uri Hochman, and Karin Ophir.

=== Television and film career ===
In 1991 Heuberger played in the film Sarah Aronson, which was directed by Orna Ben Dor.

Heuberger's significant breakthrough in the field of comedy-satire occurred when he started appearing in the Israeli satirical sketch comedy television program Hahamishia Hakamerit alongside Shai Avivi, Dov Navon, Keren Mor, and Menashe Noy. The show was broadcast between 1993 and 1997.

In 1993 Heuberger, played the role of Joseph Bau in Steven Spielberg's film Schindler's List. In the same year, he also played the role of Gabriel in the film Snow in August alongside Shai Avivi and Avigail Arieli.

In 1995, Heuberger played the role of Noam in Roni Ninio's film Actors, which tells the story of one year in the lives of graduates of an acting school who seek their breakthrough on theater stages. in 1996, Heuberger played Claudio Orna in Yochanan Raviv's film Klavim Lo Novhim Beyarok.

In 1999, Heuberger played the role of Lt. Col. Alon 'Krembo' Sagiv in the cult Israeli film Operation Grandma.

In 2000, Heuberger participated in the Israeli drama series The Bourgeoisie, which was broadcast on the Israeli Channel 2.

In 2003, Heuberger played in Dover Kosashvili's film Gift from Above alongside Moni Moshonov.

In 2006, Heuberger played in the film Winning with Miki.

In 2006, Heuberger played Moishe Waldman in Hanan Peled's film Letters to America. That same year Heuberger participated as a regular member in the Israeli entertainment TV program Mo'adon Layla.

In 2007, Heuberger played himself in the TV series Bsorot Tovot. That same year, Heuberger also played Mr. Leibowitz in the film The Little Traitor and played the character of Abner in the Israeli television series Walking the Dog directed by Nir Bergman.

In 2008, Heuberger played Michael Neumann in the drama series In Treatment alongside Assi Dayan and Ayelet Zurer, and began to participate in the Israeli comedy talk show Ba'a Betov alongside Einav Galili.

In 2010, Heuberger began to play investigator Ido Wiener in the Israeli drama series The Arbitrator. That same year Heuberger also played the head of a Yeshiva, Rabbi Yair in the Israeli drama series Other Life, directed by Eric Rothstein. In addition, during 2010 Heuberger also played in Eitan Tzur's film "Naomi" alongside Melanie Peres and Yossi Pollak.

In 2011, Heuberger began playing a fictional Israeli prime minister named Agmon in the Israeli drama series Prime Minister's Children broadcast on Hot 3.

=== Personal life and death ===
Heuberger was twice divorced. He was a father to two children from his first marriage, and two children from his second marriage. He had a relationship with actress Riki Blich.

Heuberger resided in Tel Aviv.

In 2007 an investigation was opened following a complaint of sexual harassment against Heuberger which led to a confrontation with the makeup artist who filed the complaint However, the complaint was eventually closed.

Heuberger died from cancer on 28 August 2025, at the age of 61.

== Filmography ==
- The Beast (1988) – Helicopter Co-Pilot
- Schindler's List (1993) – Josef Bau
- Sheleg B'Ogust (1993)
- Sahkanim (1995) – Noam
- Klavim Lo Novhim Beyarok (1996) – Claude – The Cop
- Mivtza Savta (1999) – Alon "Krembo" Sagiv
- Matana MiShamayim (2003) – Bakho
- Winning with Miki (2004)
- Michtavim Le America (2006) – Moishe
- The Little Traitor (2007) – Father
- Miral (2010) – Belly Dance Club Customer
- Hitpartzut X (2010) – Oded Safra
- Closed Season (2012) – Avi
- Dawn (2014) – Gideon
- Ma Kvar Yachol Likrot (2015) – Shalom Franko
- Fire Birds (2015) – Tattoo Man
- Virgins (2018) – Shmuel Siso
- Golda (2023) – Moshe Dayan
