= Tzahi Grad =

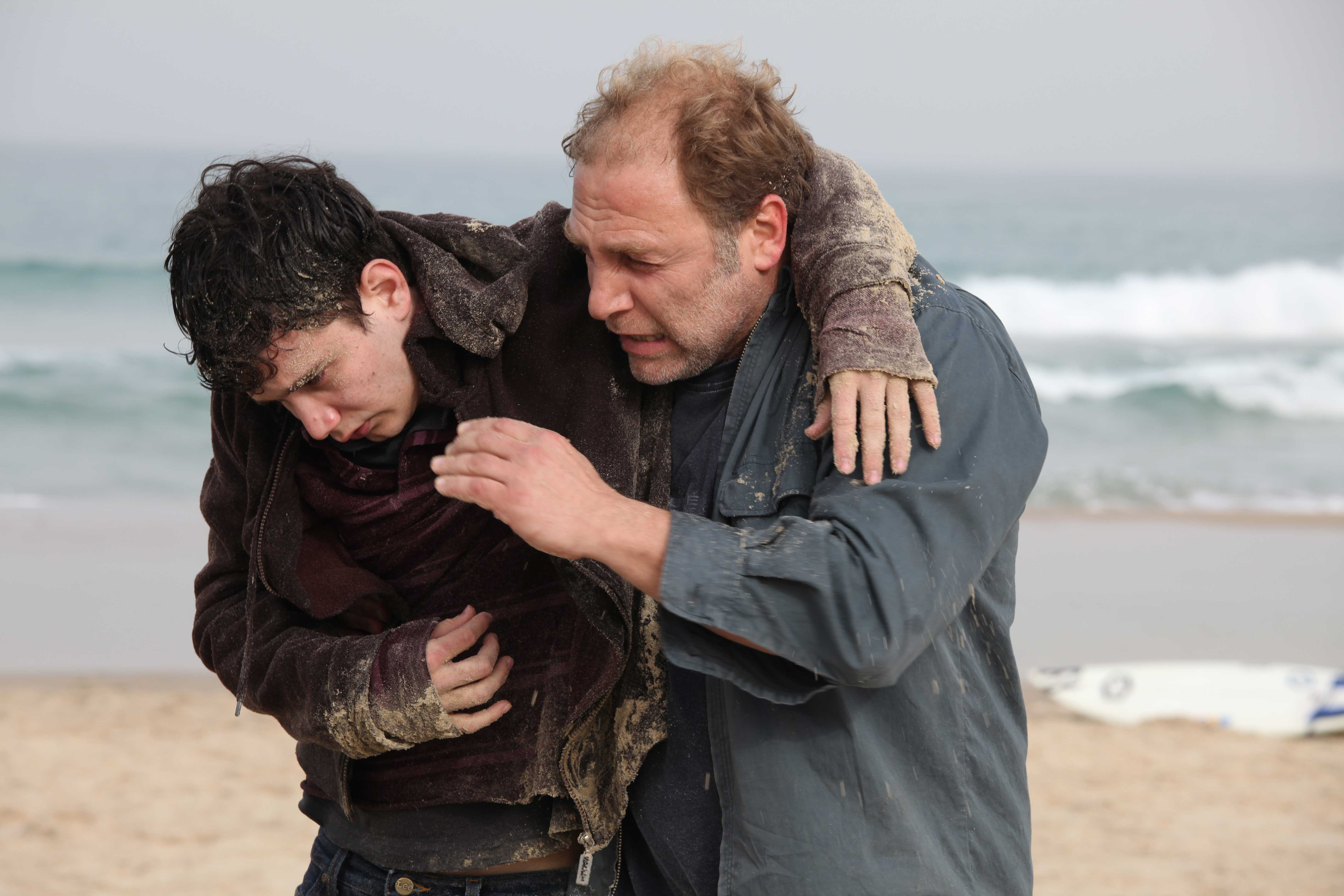
Tzahi Grad and Michael Moshonov in the movie Mabul

Tzahi Grad (Hebrew: צחי גראד; born February 28, 1962) is an Israeli film and television actor, screenwriter, and film director.

== Awards ==
- 2009: Israeli Television Academy Award: best actor in comedy series Ima'lle
- 2006: Ophir Award for Best Supporting Actor in Someone to Run With.
- Grad in the movie "The Loners"
  2006: Haifa International Film Festival: Best Israeli Film Award for Foul Gesture
