= Uvda (TV program) =

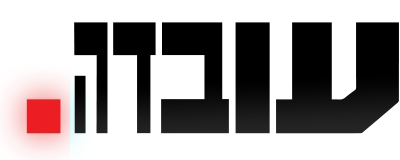
- Uvda Logo
- עובדה
- Written by: Ilana Dayan
- Directed by: Yaniv Shavtai
- Country of origin: Israel

Production
- Producer: Ruthie Steinberg
- Editors: Shani Drori, Naama Perry

Original release
- Network: Channel 12
- Release: November 1993 – present

Uvda (Hebrew: עובדה, lit. 'Fact') is an Israeli investigative and current affairs television program that first aired in November 1993 and is currently airing at Israeli Channel 12. The program is renowned for in-depth investigative reports, documentaries, and high-profile interviews. Uvda is hosted by Ilana Dayan, an Israeli investigative journalist, anchorwoman, and attorney.

Since its debut in 1993, Uvda has aired 29 seasons and 756 episodes. All seasons of the program were broadcast regularly every year except for 2001–2002.

Uvda won the award for the best current affairs or investigative program at the Israeli Academy of Film and Television for years 2009, 2013, 2017, 2019, 2020, 2021 and 2023. Uvda also won an award for the best documentary by Documentary Creators Forum for the years 2018, 2019 and 2022.
