= Moshe Ivgy =

Israeli actor and director

- משה איבגי
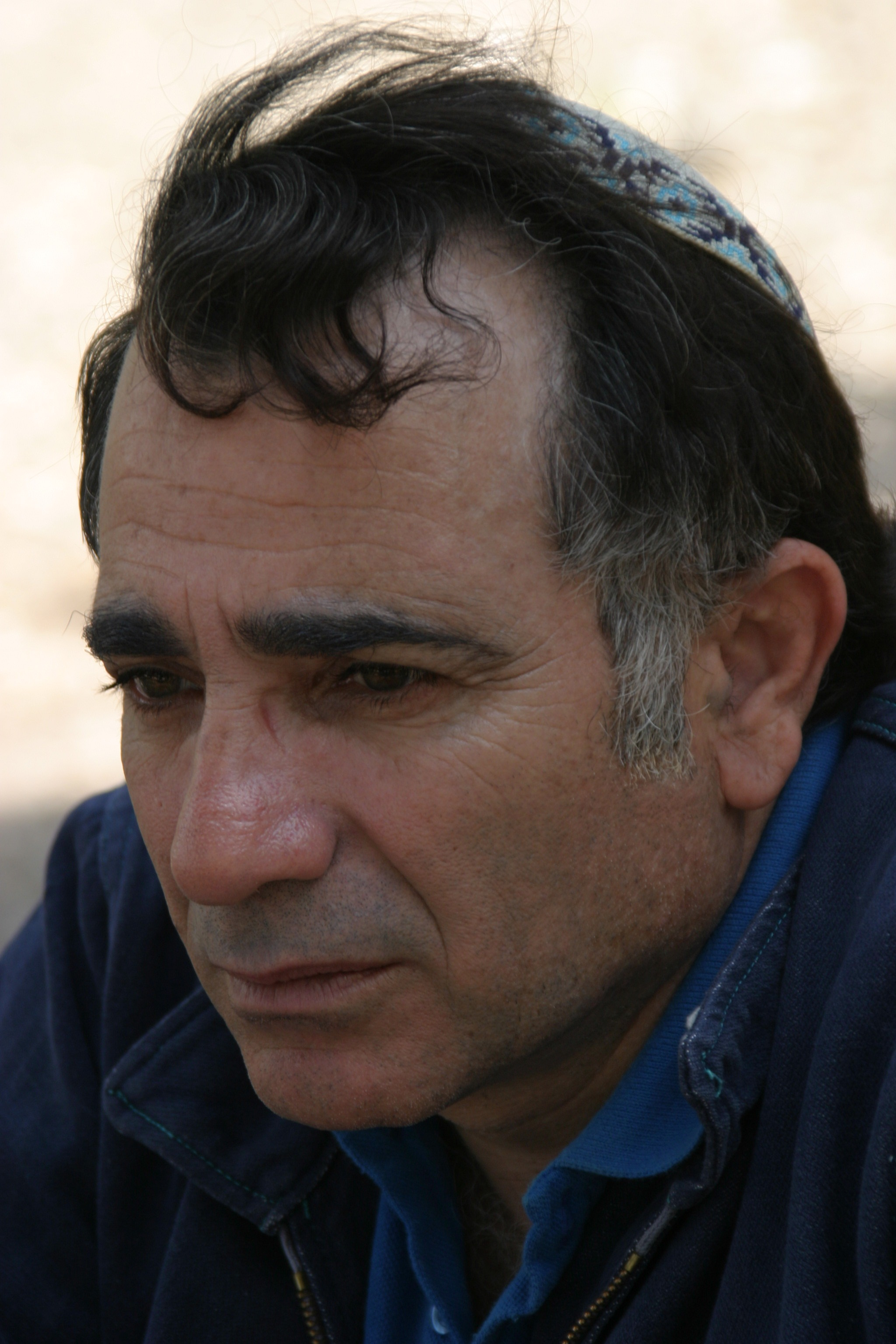
- Ivgy in 2004
- Born: November 29, 1953 (age 72); Casablanca, Morocco
- Children: 3, including Dana Ivgy (daughter)
- Status: Released
- Convictions: Indecent assault, Sexual harassment
- Penalty: 11 months imprisonment

Moshe Ivgy (Hebrew: משה איבגי; born 29 November 1953) is an Israeli actor and director.

== Biography ==
Moshe Ivgy was born in Casablanca, Morocco, to a Moroccan Jewish family. He was married to actress Irit Sheleg. Their daughter Dana Ivgy is also an actress. After divorcing Irit, he married Oreet, with whom he has two children, Ella and Lily.

Ivgy experimented with Scientology and spent some six months studying its teachings. He abandoned it, stating "it is an insane business... Those at the top earn billions and he (the average member) is destitute."

== Acting and directing career ==
Ivgy directed And on the Third Day. He co-starred with his daughter Dana in the 2010 film Hayu Leilot.

== Controversy ==
In February 2016, the Israeli media reported that Ivgy was accused by several women of sexual harassment. In May 2018, Ivgy was indicted in Haifa Magistrates Court on charges of sexual harassment and indecent acts against four women. Three of the four accusers are actresses who worked with Ivgy on film sets and in the theater. The fourth woman had no prior acquaintance with Ivgy. He approached her in a falafel shop and made unsolicited sexually explicit comments to her.

In January 2020, Ivgy was convicted of indecent assault against four women but acquitted of more serious charges. His sentence, involving a fine and six months community service, was considered by feminist groups as "lenient towards a serial offender." He was sentenced to six months of community service, six months of probation, and compensation to the complainant in the amount of NIS 10,000.

On July 12, 2021, a Haifa magistrate court sentenced Ivgy to 11 months for indecent assault. He was released from prison on March 14, 2022.

== Filmography ==
- Kohav Hashahar (1980)
- Indiani Ba'Shemesh (1981) - Atias
- Mitahat La'af (Under the Nose, 1982) (a.k.a. Big Shots, directed by Jacob Goldwasser) - Hertzel
- Gabi Ben Yakar (1982)
- Adon Leon (1982) - Momo Danino
- Kuni Lemel in Cairo (1983)
- The Ambassador (1984) - Arab Student
- Every Time We Say Goodbye (1986) - Daniel
- Bread (Lehem, 1986) - Baruch
- Ha-Krav Al HaVa'ad (1986) - Rafik
- Deadline (1987) - Adbul
- Mis'chakim Ba'Horef (1988)
- The Lookout (1990) - Asher Yashurun
- Cup Final (Gmar Gavi'a, 1991) - Cohen
- Malachim B'Ruah (1992) - Michel
- The Mummy Lives (1993) - Ali
- The Revenge of Itzik Finkelstein (Nikmato Shel Itzik Finkelstein, 1993) - Itzik Finkelstein
- The Patriots (1994) - Oron
- Sipur Shematchil Belevaya Shel Nachash (1994) - Monsieur Robert
- Max V'Morris (1994) - Morris
- Love Sick (Hole Ahava B'Shikun Gimel, 1995) - Victor
- Sof Hamis'chak (1996) - Aviad
- Ha-Dybbuk B'sde Hatapuchim Hakdoshim (1997) - Azriel
- Day After Day (Yom Yom, 1998) - Moshe
- Dangerous Acts (1998) - Yisarael
- Arim B'Layla (1998)
- Aaron Cohen's Debt (1999) - Aaron Cohen
- Zman Avir (1999) - Haim
- The Investigation Must Go On (2000) - Shalom Shalom
- Asphalt Zahov (2000)
- Sipuray Bate Kafe (2003)
- Haïm Ze Haïm (2003)
- Spartan (2004) - Avi
- Campfire (2004) - Yossi
- Metallic Blues (2004) - Siso Ben-Hamo
- Munich (2005, directed by Steven Spielberg) - Mike Harari
- The Arbitrator (Ha-Borer, 2007-2014, TV Series) - Baruch Asulin 'The Arbitrator'
- Restless (2008, directed by Amos Kollek) - Moshe
- Shiva (2008) - Haim Ohayon
- Etsba Elohim (2008) - Israel
- Ultimatum (2009) - Professeur Feist
- Haiu Leilot (There Were Nights, 2010) - Izhak Ben Shmuel
- UvaYom HaShlishi (2010) - Elisha
- My Lovely Sister (2011) - Robert
- Haolam Mats'hik (2012) - Professor Pestil
- Lean neelam Moshe Ivgy (2012) - Himself
- Menatek Ha-maim (2012)
- Youth (2013) - Moti Cooper
- Hasored (2013) - Hezi
- Hunting Elephants (2013) - Deddy
- Love Letter to Cinema (2014)
- Zaguri Imperia (2014-2015, TV Series) - Albert Zaguri
- The 90 Minute War (2016, directed by Eyal Halfon)
- Amor (2016)

== Awards and recognition ==
=== Israeli Academy Awards ===
- 2004, Nominated, Best Actor—Campfire (Medurat Hashevet)
- 2004, Won, Best Supporting Actor—Metallic Blues
- 2000, Nominated, Best Supporting Actor—The Investigation Must Go On (Haboleshet Hokeret)

=== Other ===
At the 2016 Haifa International Film Festival, Moshe Ivgy and Norman Issa shared the prize for Best Actor in a Feature Film, for The 90 Minute War.
