= Uri Avrahami =

Israeli actor (born 1949)

- אורי אברהמי
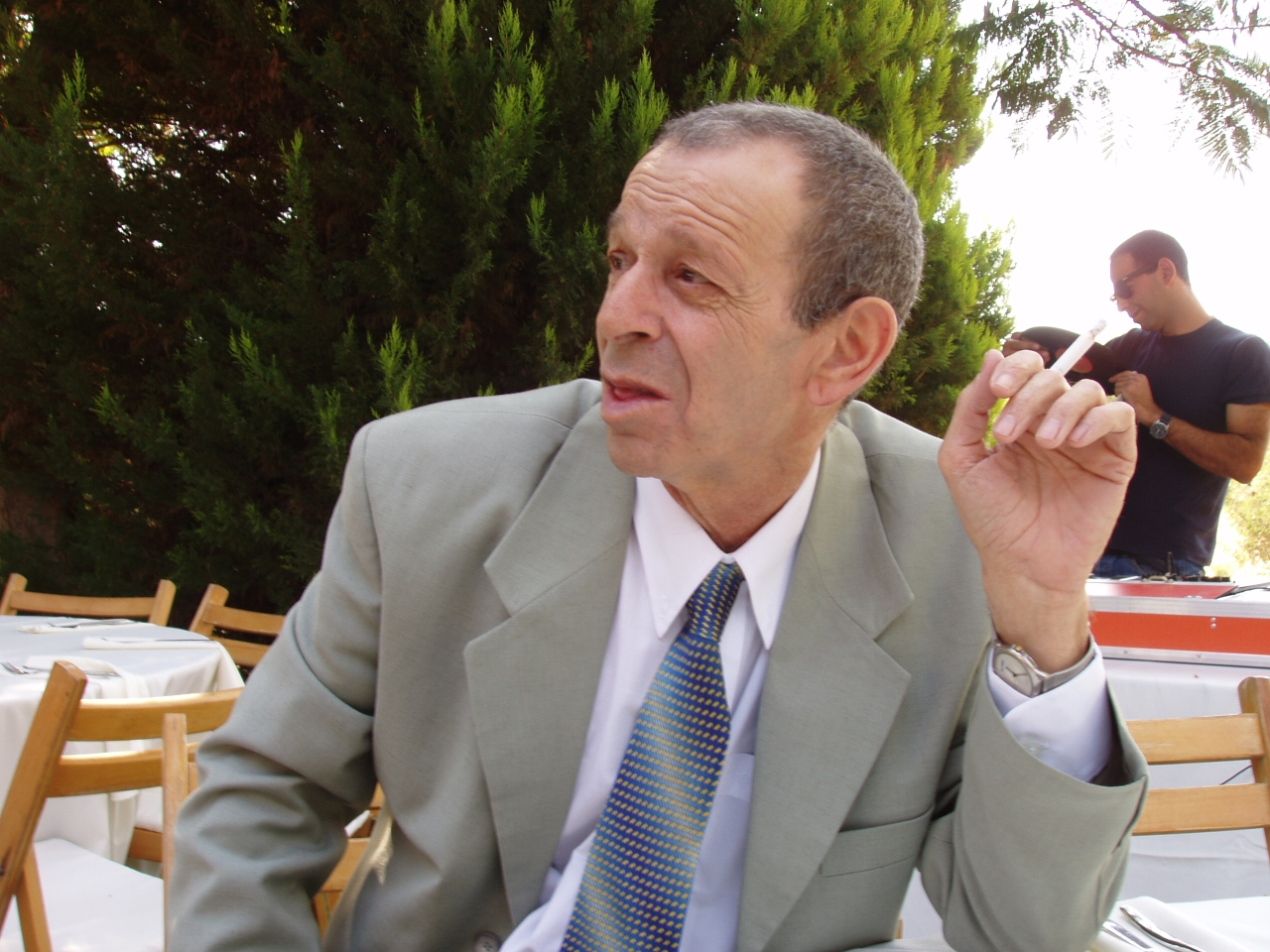
- Avrahami in 2005
- Born: 23 October 1949 (age 76); Haifa, Israel
- Occupation: Actor
- Years active: 1973–present
- Children: 2, including Idit Avrahami

Uri Avrahami (Hebrew: אורי אברהמי; born 23 October 1949) is an Israeli actor.
