= Assaf Amir =

Israeli film producer (born 1954)

- אסף אמיר
- Born: 1954 (age 71–72); Rehovot, Israel
- Education: City College of San Francisco, The New School for Social Research
- Occupation: Film producer
- Title: Chairman of The Israeli Academy of Film and Television
- Spouse: Orly Maiberg
- Children: 3

Assaf Amir (Hebrew: אסף אמיר; born 1954) is an Israeli filmmaker and television and film producer, former chairman of The Israeli Producers Association and the current chairman of The Israeli Academy of Film and Television.

== Early life and education ==
Amir was born in 1954 in Rehovot and grew up in Bat-Yam. During his childhood, he was a child actor at the Habima National Theatre.

Amir studied cinema and philosophy at the City College of San Francisco and continued his studies at The New School for Social Research in NYC. During his time in New York, he met his future wife, artist Orly Maiberg.

== Media career ==
=== Film ===
Upon his return to Israel, Amir began producing films. He was the executive producer for Aviya's Summer and Israeli Academy Awards for Best Film Winner Life According to Agfa.

In 1994, Amir founded Norma Productions, an independent production company. His first independent production was Elia Suleiman’s Chronicle of a Disappearance in 1996. It won the Best First Film Prize at the Venice International Film Festival.

In 1997, Amir produced Pick a Card (aka Afula Express), which won the Israeli Academy Award for Best Film.

In 2003, Amir produced Nir Bergman's Broken Wings, which won the Israeli Academy Award for Best Film and the Audience Award at the Berlinale film festival. Amir collaborated with Bergman again in 2010 producing his film Intimate Grammar.

In 2005, Amir produced What a Wonderful Place, which won the Israeli Academy Best Film Award, and the Special Jury award at the Karlovy Vary International Film Festival.

During the following years, Amir produced the films Noodle, The Loners and Zion and His Brother.

In 2012, Amir produced Rama Burshtein's debut film Fill the Void, which won the Israeli Academy Best Film Award and the Best Actress award at the Venice International Film Festival.

In 2016, Amir went on to produce Burshtein's next film, The Wedding Plan (aka Through the Wall).

=== Television ===
In 2005, Amir created the television drama "Reaching for Heaven" in collaboration with Shlomo Mashiach and Roni Ninio, which won the Israeli Academy Awards for Best Drama Series. In 2007 Amir produced the television drama "Walk the Dog" directed by Nir Bergman, which won the Israeli Academy Award for Best Television Drama. In 2020, Amir created Together with Noa Koller and Erez Drigues the comedy-drama Rehearsals, which won eight Israeli Academy awards (including Best Series) and was acquired by American network Hulu and distributed worldwide.

=== Documentaries ===
Amir produced many documentaries including Tali Shemesh's The Cemetery Club, Yair Qedar's Gay Days, Michal Weits's Blue Box and Nur Fibak's A Minor Crime which won the Israeli academy of film and television award for Best Documentary Film (max. 60 minutes) in 2023.

=== Other ===
Amir was the chairman of The Israeli Producers Association during the years 2012–2015. He is the chairman of The Israeli Academy of Film and Television beginning in 2019.

== Personal life ==
Amir is the grandson of Meyer Weisgal, an American Journalist, Zionist activist, and one of the founders of Weizmann Institute of Science and Beit Hatfutsot (the Jewish Diaspora Museum). His parents were among the founders of Kibbutz Shoval. Amir is married to artist Orly Maiberg. They have three children. He currently resides in Tel Aviv.

== Filmography ==
=== Feature films ===
As producer unless otherwise noted
Year	Title	Notes
1988	Aviya's Summer	Executive producer
1993	Life According to Agfa	Executive producer
1996	Chronicle of a Disappearance	Executive producer
1997	Afula Express	
2003	Broken Wings	
2004	Riky Riky	
2005	What a Wonderful Place	
2007	Noodle	
2009	The Loners	
2009	Zion and His Brother	
2010	Intimate Grammar	
2010	Dusk	
2012	Fill the Void	
2016	The Wedding Plan	
2016	Epilogue	
2016	The 90 Minute War	
2022	Sand Flakes	

=== Documentary films ===
As producer unless otherwise noted
Year	Title	Notes
2004	Melting Siberia	
2006	Tali Fahima: Crossing The Lines	
2006	The Cemetery Club	
2007	A Million Bullets in October	
2009	Gay Days	
2013	Turning Thirteen	
2015	This Boy Is Me	
2015	Meshulam	
2016	Let's Dance	
2017	Rachel Agmon	
2019	Chasing Yehoshua	
2019	Open Your Mouth	
2020	Blue Box	
2023	A minor Crime	

=== Television ===
As producer unless otherwise noted
Year	Title	Notes
2000–2005	Reaching for Heaven	
2009	Walk the Dog	Written by Shirly Moshaioff
2009	Castles in the Sky	
2010	The Journalists	
2012	The Albums	
2017	A Standard Love Song: Arik Einstein	
2020	Rehearsals	

== Awards and nominations ==
Awards and nominations received by Assaf Amir
Award	Year	Nominated work	Category	Result	Ref.
43rd Berlin International Film Festival	1992	Life According to Agfa	Golden Bear	Nominated	
43rd Berlin International Film Festival	1992	Life According to Agfa	Honourable Mention	Won	
Jerusalem Film Festival	1992	Life According to Agfa	Best Film	Won	
Israeli Academy Awards	1993	Life According to Agfa	Best Film	Won	
53rd Venice International Film Festival	1996	Chronicle of a Disappearance	Luigi De Laurentis Award for a Debut Film	Won	
Israeli Academy Awards	1997	Afula Express	Best Film	Won	
Jerusalem Film Festival	1997	Afula Express	Best Film	Won	
Tokyo International Film Festival	2002	Broken Wings	Grand Prix	Won	
Jerusalem Film Festival	2002	Broken Wings	Best Film	Won	
52nd Berlin International Film Festival	2003	Broken Wings	Panorama Audience Award	Won	
Israeli Academy Awards	2003	Broken Wings	Best Film	Won	
40th Karlovy Vary International Film Festival	2005	What a Wonderful Place	Special Jury Prize	Won	
Jerusalem Film Festival	2005	What a Wonderful Place	Best Film	Won	
Israeli Academy Awards	2005	What a Wonderful Place	Best Film	Won	
Israeli Academy Awards	2006	The Cemetery Club	Best Documentary	Nominated	
European Film Awards	2006	The Cemetery Club	European Documentary	Nominated	
Dok Leipzig	2006	The Cemetery Club	White Dove	Won	
Shanghai International Film Festival	2006	The Cemetery Club	Magnolia Award - Best Asian Documentary	Won	
Warsaw International Film Festival	2006	The Cemetery Club	Best Documentary	Nominated	
Israeli Academy Awards	2007	Noodle	Best Film	Nominated	
Montreal World Film Festival	2007	Noodle	Special Grand Prize of the Jury	Won	
Montreal World Film Festival	2007	Noodle	Grand Prix des Amériques	Nominated	
Israeli Academy Awards	2009	The Loners	Best Film	Nominated	
Jerusalem Film Festival	2009	The Loners	Best Film	Nominated	
Jerusalem Film Festival	2010	Intimate Grammar	Best Film	Won	
Tokyo International Film Festival	2010	Intimate Grammar	Grand Prix	Won	
Israeli Academy Awards	2012	Fill the Void	Best Film	Won	
69th Venice International Film Festival	2012	Fill the Void	Golden Lion	Nominated	
69th Venice International Film Festival	2012	Fill the Void	SIGNIS Award	Nominated – Special Mention	
28th Independent Spirit Awards	2012	Fill the Void	Best First Feature	Nominated – Special Mention	
2012 Toronto International Film Festival	2012	Fill the Void	FIPRESCI Discovery	Nominated	
69th Venice International Film Festival	2012	Epilogue	Best film (Venice Nights)	Nominated	
73rd Venice International Film Festival	2016	The Wedding Plan	Horizons - Best Film	Nominated	
Israeli Academy Awards	2016	The Wedding Plan	Best Film	Nominated	
Stockholm International Film Festival	2016	The Wedding Plan	Bronze Horse - Best Film	Nominated	
Israeli Academy Awards	2023	A Minor Crime	Best Documentary Film (max. 60 minutes)	Won	
