= List of Israeli films of the 1990s =

A list of films produced in Israel in the 1990s.

== Overview ==
During the 1990s, there was a certain improvement in the amount of audience going to films, especially to a number of prominent cinematic successes, while the rest of the films failed at the box office. These films drew away from both politics and from the Bourekas films and primarily focused on the personal aspect of Israeli society. In addition to that there was an emergence of films about anti-heroes at the margins of society. A good example for this is the film Amazing Grace of Amos Gutman which dealt with AIDS patients.

Among the most prominent films of this period: Life According to Agfa (Asi Dayan), Over the Ocean (Yaacov Goldwasser), Zohar (Eran Riklis), Song of the Siren (Eytan Fox), Lovesick on Nana Street (Savi Gavison), Leylasede (Shemi Zarhin), Afula Express (Julie Shles), Yana's Friends (Arik Kaplun) and Strangers in the Night (Serge Ankri).
