= 34th Karlovy Vary International Film Festival =

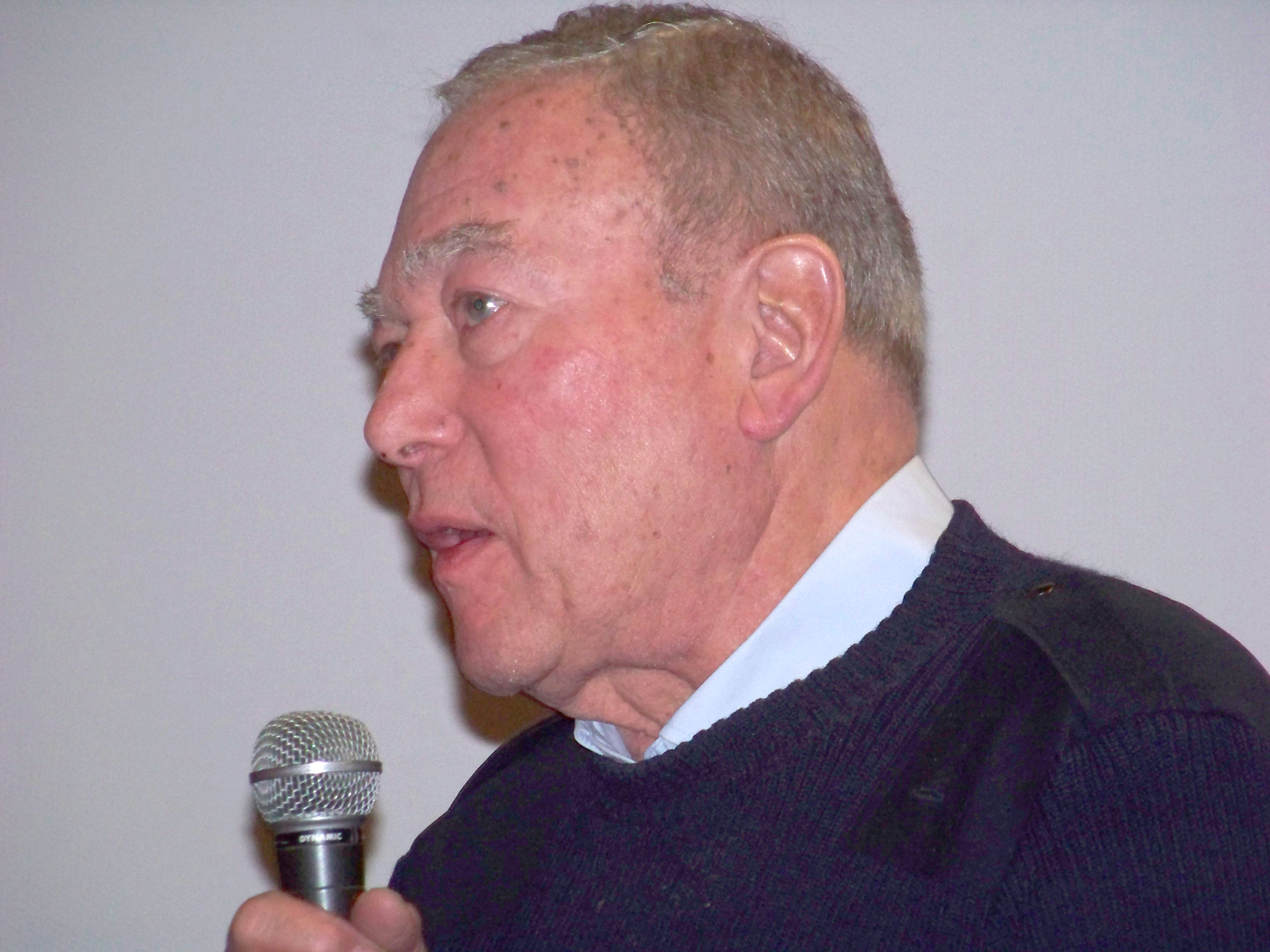
Yves Boisset, Jury President

The 34th Karlovy Vary International Film Festival took place from 2 to 10 July 1999. The Crystal Globe was won by Yana's Friends, an Israeli comedy-drama film directed by Arik Kaplun. The second prize, the Special Jury Prize was won by Show Me Love, a Swedish comedy-drama film directed by Lukas Moodysson. French film director and scriptwriter Yves Boisset was the president of the jury.

== Jury ==
The following people formed the jury of the festival:

- Yves Boisset, Jury President (France)
- Jaroslav Brabec (Spain)
- Jutta Brückner (Germany)
- Dan Fainaru (Israel)
- Katinka Faragó (Sweden)
- Brian Gilbert (UK)
- Karen Šachnazarov (Russia)

== Official selection awards ==
The following feature films and people received the official selection awards:

- Crystal Globe (Grand Prix) - Yana's Friends (Ha-Chaverim Shel Yana) by Arik Kaplun (Israel)
- Special Jury Prize - Show Me Love (Fucking Åmål) by Lukas Moodysson (Sweden)
- Best Director Award - Aleksandr Rogozhkin for Checkpoint (Blokpost) (Russia)
- Best Actress Award - Evelyn Kaplun for her role in Yana's Friends (Ha-Chaverim Shel Yana) (Israel)
- Best Actor Award - Hilmar Thate for his role in Paths in the Night (Wege in die Nacht) (Germany)
- Special Jury Mention - Cosy Dens (Pelíšky) by Jan Hřebejk (Czech Republic)

== Other statutory awards ==
Other statutory awards that were conferred at the festival:

- Crystal Globe for Outstanding Artistic Contribution to World Cinema - Karel Kachyňa (Czech Republic), Franco Zeffirelli (Italy)
- Award of the Town of Karlovy Vary - Nikita Michalkov (Russia)
- Audience Award - Show Me Love (Fucking Åmål) by Lukas Moodysson (Sweden)

== Non-statutory awards ==
The following non-statutory awards were conferred at the festival:

- FIPRESCI International Critics Award: Cosy Dens (Pelíšky) by Jan Hřebejk (Czech Republic)
  - Special Mention: Drop Dead Gorgeous by Michael Patrick Jann (USA)
- FICC - The Don Quixote Prize: Show Me Love (Fucking Åmål) by Lukas Moodysson (Sweden)
  - Special Mention: Girl on the Bridge (La fille sur le pont) by Patrice Leconte (France)
- Ecumenical Jury Award: A Reasonable Man by Gavin Hood (South Africa, France)
  - Special Mention: Yana's Friends (Ha-Chaverim Shel Yana) by Arik Kaplun (Israel) & Beautiful People by Jasmin Dizdar (UK)
- Philip Morris Film Award: The Outskirts (Okraina) by Pyotr Lutsik (Russia)
- Emila Radoka Award: Helluva Good Luck (Z pekla štěstí) by Zdeněk Troška (Czech Republic)
