= Shiron.net =

Israeli website

Shironet
- Website type: Lyrics
- Available in: Hebrew
- Owner: Keshet Broadcast Ltd
- Website: http://shironet.mako.co.il:80/
- Commercial: Yes
- Registration: Optional
- Launched: 2002
- Current status: Online

shironet.mako.co.il, also known as Shironet (Hebrew: שִירוֹנֶט), is an Israeli website that presents the lyrics of Hebrew songs. It is the largest of its kind. It also presents lyrics of non-Hebrew songs, trivia puzzles, ringtones, video clips, general information about Israeli musicians, pictures of Israeli musicians, ads of concerts, and internet forums. Shironnet complies with copyright laws and pays ACUM (the association of Israeli song creators that represents poets, composers, and lyricists) for each entry to a lyrics webpage or a video clip webpage, in order to pass the payments to the artists.

== History ==
Shironet was established in 2002 as a "pirate website" that presented lyrics without paying for them. However, since 2003 it works legally.

In 2003, Israeli composer and lyricist Naomi Shemer had Shironet remove all her songs' lyrics. After many requests from the website, the lyrics were added again by her heirs in 2006. In 2006 Assaf Amdorski also had his lyrics removed from Shironet.

In 2012 was purchased by Keshet Broadcasting, the biggest Israeli media provider and became a part of the Keshet's website mako.
