= Fire Dance (TV series) =

Israeli television drama series

- ריקוד האש
- Genre: Drama
- Created by: Rama Burshtein
- Directed by: Rama Burshtein
- Starring: Mia Irvin; Yehuda Levi; Noa Koler
- Country of origin: Israel
- Original language: Hebrew
- No. of seasons: 1
- No. of episodes: 8

Production
- Producers: Shira Margalit; Elad Kuperman
- Cinematography: Shai Goldman
- Editor: Ilana Reina
- Running time: 50 minutes
- Production company: Yes Studios

Original release
- Network: Yes Drama
- Release: 2022

Fire Dance (Hebrew: ריקוד האש) is an Israeli television drama series created by Rama Burshtein. The Haredi drama stars Mia Irvin, Yehuda Levi and Noa Koler. It is a Yes Studios original series and was broadcast in Israel on Yes Drama. It is streamed internationally by the Jewish streaming service, ChaiFlicks.

== Plot summary ==
Set in a fictional Haredi community in Tiberias, the story focuses on Feigi (Irvin) and Natan (Levi). Feigi is a vulnerable young woman living with her abusive mother (Koller). Natan is a charismatic married rabbi who runs the women's sewing workshop where Feigi works. Natan's father, the rebbe, dies and he is a contender to lead as the community's spiritual rabbi. His reputation as a "woman's rabbi" stands in the way of his appointment. Feigi develops feelings for her married boss, Natan.

== Cast and characters ==
=== Main ===
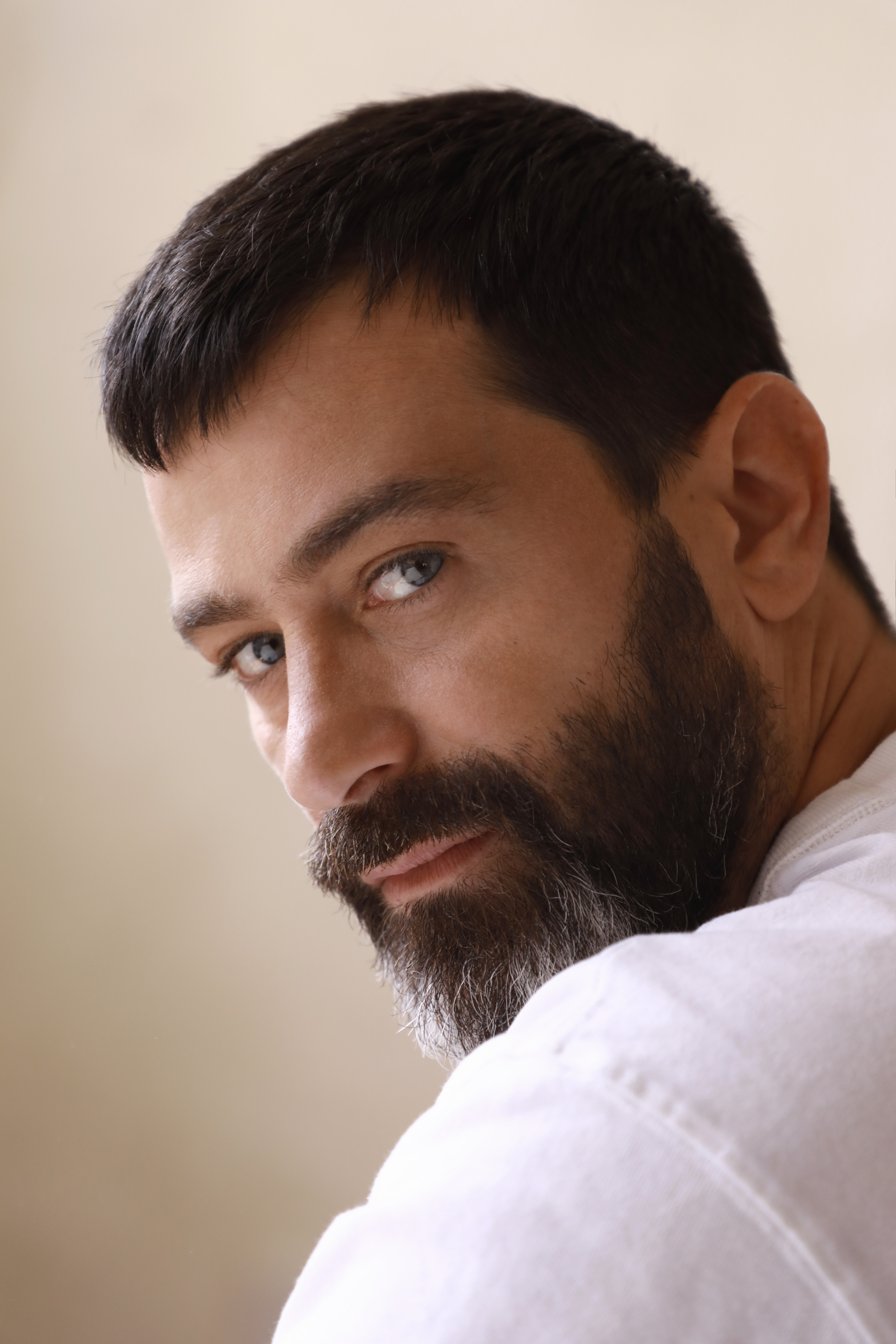
Yehuda Levi stars as Natan.

- Mia Ivryn as Feigi Rosenberg:

A vulnerable young woman who self-harms and lives with her abusive mother, Reyzi (Koler). She works at the women's sewing workshop.

- Yehuda Levi as Natan Shulman:

A charismatic and handsome rabbi who considers fulfilling the wish of his late father, the rebbe, in succeeding him in leading the community. He is also the boss of the women's sewing workshop.

- Noa Koler as Reyzi Rosenberg:

Feigi's (Irvin) haunted and abusive mother, she is also a widow.

- Irit Sheleg as Bluma Shulman:

Natan and Srulik's mother and wife of the late rebbe. She does not agree with her late husband's wishes for Natan to become the community's rebbe, and favours Srulik for the position.

- Uri Blufarb as Shalom Shulman:

Natan's charismatic son whom Natan and Srulik have agreed will one day be rebbe after one of the brothers.

- Yael Vekstein as Yocheved Shulman:

Natan's pregnant wife

- Netta Shpigelman as Mina

A woman in an unhappy marriage, she seeks solace in Rabbi Natan and quickly becomes obsessed, developing romantic feelings towards him.

- Noam Frost as Libbi Shulman

The unmarried and beautiful daughter of Bluma and the late Rebbe, and sister to Natan and Srulik. She works as a schoolteacher and engages in a stricter form of Tzniut, covering everything except her eyes.

=== Recurring ===
- Yehonatan Vilozny as Yosef:

Feigi's cousin.

- Nelly Mira-Rubin as Giti Gurevich:

Yitzhak's (Blair) estranged wife, who struggles to convince him to grant her a divorce (Get). She goes on a hunger strike in protest. Giti and her husband previously lost a son, Mordechai.

- Rani Blair as Yitzhak Gurevich

Giti's (Mira-Rubin) husband who refuses to grant her a Get. Yitzhak and his wife previously lost a son, Mordechai.

- Leib Levin as Frenkel

A young man who leads a war against the women that visit Rabbi Natan, chastising them for immodesty.

- Ido Bartal as Srulik Shulman:

Natan's brother who is also vying to be the community's rebbe

- Naya Bienstock as Sheyne Shulman:

A high school student and the daughter of Strulik (Bartal). She gets engaged to the Bolinover Rebbe, Naftali Schwartz.

== Production ==
=== Filming ===
Filming took place in Israel over the course of two months, in November and December 2021. Burshtein decided to set and film much of the series in Tiberias as it connected to her own biography. As a secular woman, she was not impressed with the '80s aesthetic and appearance of the city. However, when she became religious, she looked at the city differently. She recognized its place in the Scriptures as one of the five holy places in the world and that "It could never be Tuscany, because there’s so much holiness in this place."

=== Casting ===
Burshtein spoke to Kveller about her reasons for casting Levi, a secular actor: "He’s 44 [now]. All his sensibilities, all his intelligence, is very, very strong when you say action. We would rehearse, and he doesn’t know the text… but when you say action, he knows the text. It’s a bit mystical, the way he’s so talented. He understands characters in such a deep way that I could really speak to him in my terms and he understood it, which is not easy."

Bushtein previously cast Irit Sheleg as the matriarch, Rivka Mendelman in her 2012 drama film, Fill the Void. Bushtein had also previously worked with Noa Koler, directing her in The Wedding Plan (2016).

=== Music ===
The soundtrack and songs in the series are provided by the Israeli musician, Daniel Zamir. Burshtein hired Zamir before she cast the show and he wrote the music after reading the script.

== Reception ==
The show has been a critical success, winning three awards from the Israeli Academy of Television. The Jewish Chronicle described it as a "gripping coming-of-age love story" and included it in its list of best television for 2024. Levi was awarded the Best Actor award for an international series at Series Mania in France in 2022. Writing in The Forward, Simi Horwitz praised the show: "Rama Burshtein-Shai’s eight-part TV series Fire Dance is also one of the most haunting, even mystical and, in the end, compelling works that I’ve seen in a long time."

== See also ==
- Israeli television
- Culture of Israel
