= Evelyn Kaplun =

Israeli actress

- אוולין קפלון
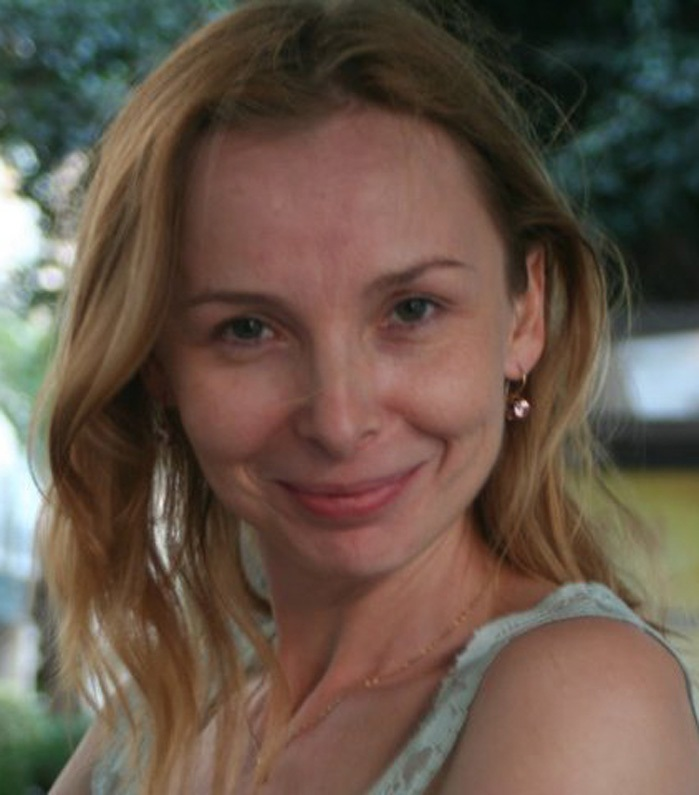
- Born: November 4, 1971; Saint Petersburg, Soviet Union
- Citizenship: Israel
- Spouse: Eric Kaplun
- Children: 1
- Awards: Ophir Award

Evelyn Kaplun (Hebrew: אוולין קפלון; Russian: Эвелин Каплун; born 4 November 1971) is an Israeli actress, known for winning the Ophir Award for Best Actress for her role in the film Yana's Friends.

== Biography ==
Kaplon was born in Saint Petersburg, Soviet Union (now Russia). At the age of 16, in 1987, she moved to a dormitory in her hometown to pursue her studies at an acting school. In 1990, at the age of 19, she immigrated to Israel independently, without her family.

== Career ==
Kaplon's acting career began in 1997 with her role in film "Afula Express" alongside Zvika Hadar and Esti Zakheim, a film that won the Volgin Award at the Jerusalem Film Festival. In 1999, she starred in film "Yana's Friends", portraying a young Russian immigrant during the Gulf War, earning her the Best Actress award. After moving to Los Angeles in 2000, Kaplon shifted towards film editing before returning to Israel in 2004 to appear in "The Syrian Bride". She later starred in notable films, including "What a Wonderful Place" (2005) and "Intimate Grammar" (2010).

Kaplun plays the character "Lina Segovia" in the Israeli TV series HaShminiya.

== Personal life ==
Evelyn is married to director Eric Kaplun. In 2000, she and her husband moved to Los Angeles. They have a daughter. They returned to Israel in 2003.
