= Here We Are (film) =

2020 Israeli film

- Theatrical release poster
- Hebrew: הנה אנחנו
- Directed by: Nir Bergman
- Screenplay by: Dana Idisis
- Produced by: Eitan Mansuri; Jonathan Doweck
- Cinematography: Shai Goldman
- Edited by: Ayala Bengad
- Production companies: Spiro Films; Rosamont
- Release date: 11 September 2020 (TIFF)
- Running time: 94 minutes
- Countries: Israel; Italy
- Language: Hebrew

Here We Are (Hebrew: הנה אנחנו, translit. Hine Anachnu) is a 2020 Israeli-Italian drama film directed by Nir Bergman, written by Dana Idisis. Starring Shai Avivi and Noam Imber it explores the relationship between a father and his autistic teenager son.

An official selection of the 2020 Cannes Film Festival, the film had its world premiere in the 2020 Toronto International Film Festival. It was nominated for nine Ophir Awards including Best Feature Film.

Screenwriter Dana Idisis, whose brother is autistic, also wrote the script for the Israeli TV series On the Spectrum, later adapted in the US titled As We See It, which also showed the lives of autistic people.

== Plot ==
Aharon has a very close relationship with his son Uri, an autistic young man in his early 20s. Aharon devotes himself to the full time care of Uri in their home in Tivon in northern Israel. Uri’s mother, Tamara, lives apart but often visits. Tamara and social services think the best future for Uri is in a special residential community for those with autism. The prospect frightens Uri and when the time comes for Uri to move to the residential facility, Uri becomes distressed and Aharon decides to takes Uri away in an attempt to evade social services. After a number of days avoiding the authorities, Aharon comes to terms with the inevitable move. After initial problems, Uri settles in his new home, and Aharon understands it is in Uri's best interests.

== Cast ==
- Shai Avivi as Aharon
- Noam Imber as Uri
- Smadi Wolfman as Tamara
- Efrat Ben-Zur as Effi

== Critical response ==
The film was generally praised by critics. On the review aggregator website Rotten Tomatoes, 100% of 9 critics' reviews are positive, with an average rating of 7.9/10.
