= Yona (film) =

2014 film

- Film poster
- יונה
- Directed by: Nir Bergman
- Written by: Nir Bergman
- Starring: Naomi lvov
- Release date: 1 January 2014
- Country: Israel
- Language: Hebrew

Yona (Hebrew: יונה) is a 2014 Israeli drama film directed by Nir Bergman. It was nominated for the Ophir Award for Best Film.

== Cast ==
- Naomi Levov
- Michael Moshonov
