= The Cemetery Club (2006 film) =

2006 documentary film directed by Tali Shemesh

- Hebrew: מועדון בית הקברות
- Directed by: Tali Shemesh
- Written by: Tali Shemesh
- Produced by: Assaf Amir, Guy Lavi
- Starring: Lena Bar, Minya Rubin
- Cinematography: Sharon De-Mayo
- Edited by: Aliza Esquira
- Release date: 2006
- Running time: 90 minutes
- Country: Israel
- Languages: Hebrew, Polish

The Cemetery Club (Hebrew: מועדון בית הקברות, romanized: Mo'adon Beit Hakvarot) is a 2006 Israeli documentary film directed by Tali Shemesh.

The film opened the 2006 DocAviv film festival, to rave reviews and several awards. It then went on to screenings at many international festivals, including the Cannes Film Festival, and won the White Dove award at Dok Leipzig. It is considered the most successful Israeli documentary ever.

== Synopsis ==
The film follows five years of meetings of a group of elderly Holocaust survivors who came to Israel from Poland after World War II. They meet each week at the Mount Herzl Cemetery in Jerusalem, where they have discussions and read their own writings. The group has association rules, called "the Mt. Herzl Academy".

The group includes the director's grandmother, Minia, and her great-aunt Lena. Over the recorded period, some of the group's members pass away, affecting relationships within the group and causing Holocaust memories to surface.

== Production ==
The film was financed by Channel 8, Noga Communications, and the New Film and Television Fund, with a budget of $110,000. It was produced by Asaf Amir and Guy Lavi of Norma Production Company.

== Reception ==
Haaretz's Uri Klein described the film as both touching and endearing, and he commended the director's balanced and discreet treatment of the subjects. In Yedioth Ahronoth, Shmulik Duvdevani called the film "moving" and "beautiful", and praised Shemesh for the sensitive way she portrayed the group and its members: "With great intelligence, Shemesh avoids turning the seniors' meetings into an anthropological curiosity".

== Awards ==
Year	Award	Category	Result
2006	Docaviv	Best Cinematography	Won
2006	Awards of the Israeli Film Academy (Ophir Award)	Best Documentary	Nominated
2006	European Film Awards	European Documentary	Nominated
2006	Dok Leipzig	White Dove	Won
2006	Shanghai International Film Festival	Magnolia Award - Best Asian Documentary	Won
2006	Warsaw International Film Festival	Best Documentary	Nominated
