= Mosko Alkalai =

Israeli actor (1931–2008)

- מוסקו אלקלעי
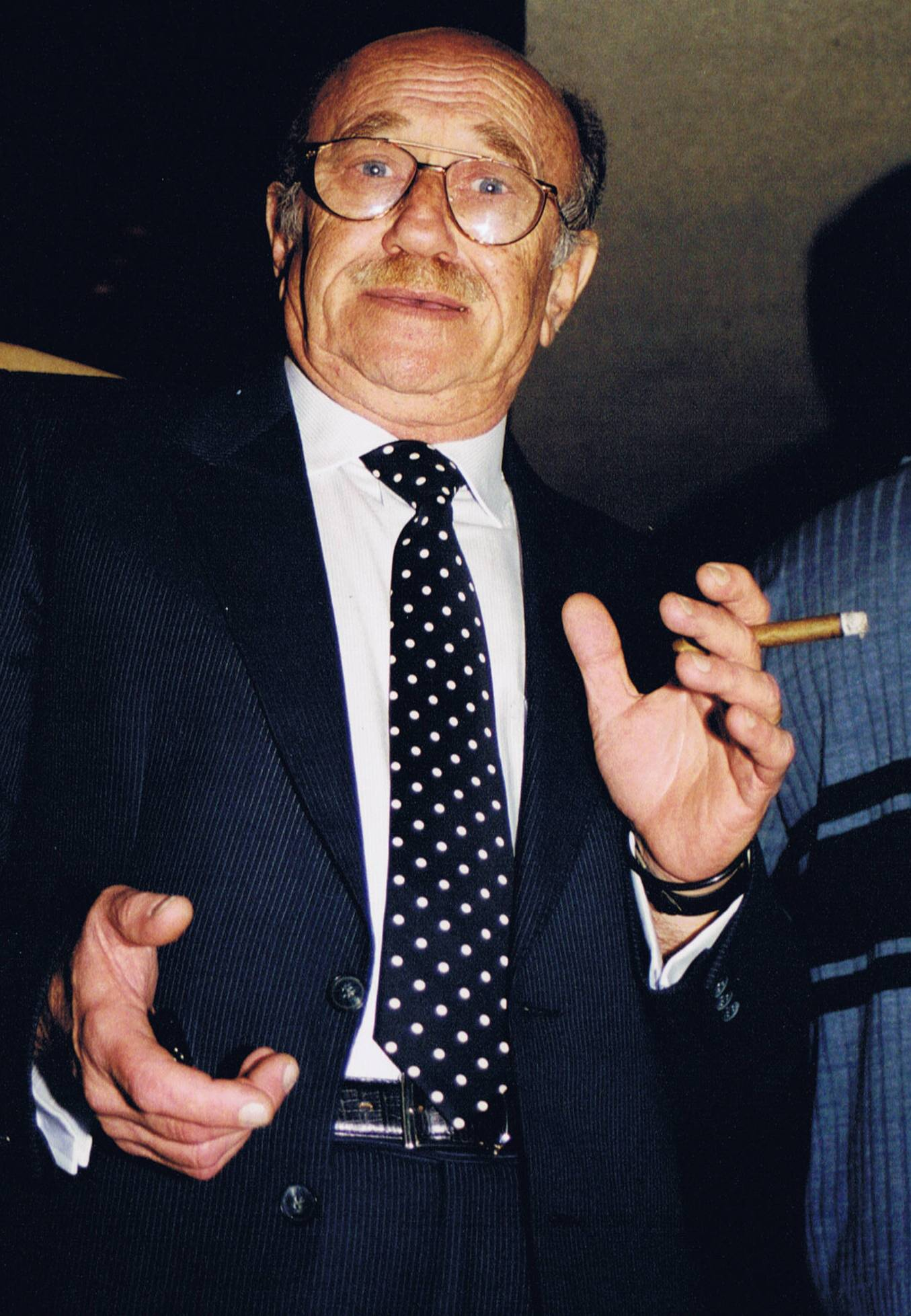
- Born: 10 March 1931; Bucharest, Romania
- Died: 1 April 2008 (aged 77); Tel Aviv, Israel
- Occupation: Actor
- Years active: 1948–2008

Mosko Alkalai (Hebrew: מוסקו אלקלעי; 10 March 1931 – 1 April 2008) was an Israeli actor. He was best known for a string of hits including Blaumilch Canal, The Fox in the Chicken Coop and Yana's Friends.

== Career ==
Born in Bucharest to a Romanian Sephardi-Jewish family, Alkalai's career in acting started relatively late, though his career in film and theater roles spanned 40 years. He appeared in dozens of Israeli films and theater productions. Alkalai was extremely active in professional organizations within the Israeli entertainment industry. He served as the chairman of the Israeli Union of Performing Arts. and was also a member of the Israeli Film Academy and the Israeli Arts Council. Alkalai was the 2003 winner of the Israeli Film Academy's lifetime Achievement Award.

== Personal life ==
Mosko Alkalai died of respiratory failure at the age of 77 on April 1, 2008, in Tel Aviv. He had undergone surgery at Tel Aviv Sourasky Medical Center several weeks prior to his death, but never recovered. His casket was placed at the Habima Theatre in Tel Aviv before he was buried at Kiryat Shaul Cemetery. He was survived by his wife, Rodika, and their two sons, Ron and Shai.

== Partial filmography ==
- Ervinka (1967) - Zigler
- Ha-Ben Ha'Oved (1968)
- Blaumilch Canal (1969) - Zelig Schultheiss
- Madron (1970) - Claude (uncredited)
- Bloomfield (1971) - 1st Committee Man
- 7 fois... par jour (1971)
- Salomonico (1972)
- Hagiga Le'enayim (1975)
- Hagiga B'Snuker (1975) - Azriel's Employer
- Ha-Diber Ha-11 (1975)
- Hamesh Ma'ot Elef Shahor (1975)
- Ha-Shu'al B'Lool Hatarnagalot (1978) - Tzemach Goorevitch
- Jesus (1979) - Matthew
- Repeat Dive (1982)
- Edut Me'ones (1984) - Belkin
- Goodbye, New York (1985) - Papalovski
- Nadia (1986) - English Teacher
- The Delta Force (1986) - TV reporter
- Bar 51 (1986) - Karl
- Le testament d'un poète juif assassiné (1988) - Paltiel's Father
- Meeting Venus (1991) - Jean Gabor
- Revenge of Itzik Finkelstein (1993)
- Mehapeset Baal Al Arba (1993)
- The Mummy Lives (1993) - Kroll
- Ha-Gamal Hame'ofef (1994)
- Ein Shemot Al Hadlatot (1997) - Kuba
- Voyages (1999) - Shimon
- Yana's Friends (1999) - Yitzhak
- Shisha Million Rasisim (2001) - Yitzhak
- The Holy Land (2001) - Professor Milan
- Rashevski's Tango (2003) - Rabbi Shmouel
- Alenbi Romance (2005)
- Eskimosim ba Galil (2006) - Mundek
- Julia Mia (2007) - Johnny's father
- King of Beggars (2007) - Yankalle Soffer
- Landsman (2009) - Ze'ev Landsman (final film role)
