= Shmil Ben Ari =

Israeli actor (born 1952)

- שמיל בן ארי
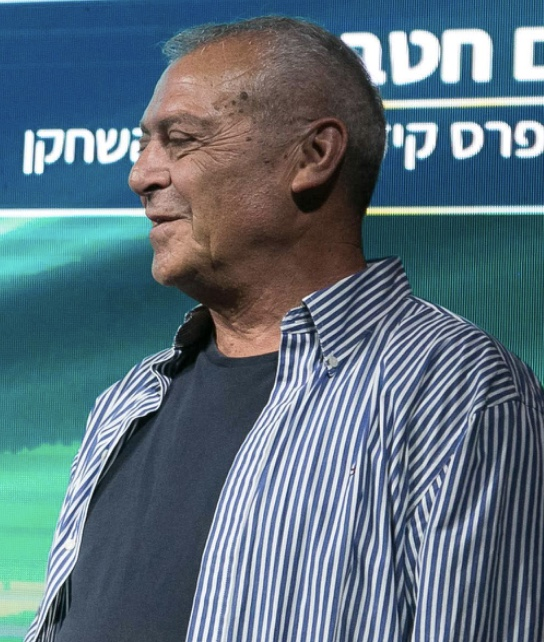
- Ben Ari in 2019
- Born: Shimon Ben-Harush; 7 February 1952 (age 74); Jerusalem, Israel
- Occupations: Actor; voice artist
- Years active: 1982–present
- Children: 3

Shmil Ben Ari (Hebrew: שמיל בן ארי; born 7 February 1952) is an Israeli actor and voice actor.

== Biography ==
Ben Ari was born in Jerusalem, to a Maghrebi Jewish family with parents who emigrated from Morocco and Tunisia. He studied at Beit Zvi.

As an actor, Ben Ari was the star of the award-winning TV series Meorav Yerushalmi (Jerusalem Mix), popular shows such as Hostages, Zinzana, Merhav Yarkon, Our Boys and Rechov Sumsum and films such as An Electric Blanket Named Moshe (for which he received an Israeli Film Academy Best Actor Award), Buzz, Life According To Agfa, Lovesick on Nana Street, Nina's Tragedies, Lost Islands and Yana's Friends.

As a voice actor, Ben Ari performed the Hebrew voice of Shifu in the Kung Fu Panda franchise as well as Don Lino in Shark Tale.

From 2016 to 2017, he played a secondary role in the series Metumtemet, which was broadcast on HOT.

== Awards ==
- 1994 Israeli Film Academy Award for Best Leading Actor – An Electric Blanket Named Moshe
- 2004 Israeli Television Academy Award for Best Actor in a drama – Meorav Yerushalmi
- 2008 Israeli Film Academy Award for Best Supporting Actor – Lost Islands
