= Metumtemet =

Israeli TV series

- Genre: Drama
- Created by: Bat Chen Sabag, Shay Cafon
- Directed by: Shay Cafon
- Starring: Bat Chen Sabag Mooki; Moshe Ashkenazi; Shani Klein; Mikki Laon; Ruthy Asarsay; Yaakov Zadeh-Daniel; Nadav Nitas; Lior Raz; Shmil Ben Ari; Gaya Shlita-Katz; Adi Alon; Dror Keren Dover Kosashvili
- Composer: Assaf Amdursky
- Country of origin: Israel
- Original language: Hebrew
- No. of seasons: 3
- No. of episodes: 73

Production
- Executive producers: Yehonatan Paran (Hebrew: יהונתן פארן), Rachel Paran (Hebrew: רחל פארן)
- Producer: Ronan Gershuni (Hebrew: רענן גרשוני)

Original release
- Network: Hot 3
- Release: 26 September 2016 – 10 November 2019

Metumtemet (Hebrew: מטומטמת) is an Israeli crime drama TV series that aired from September 26, 2016 to November 10, 2019 on HOT. The show was directed by Shay Capon and was written and produced by Bat Chen Sabag. Sabag also stars as the lead character.

The first and second seasons were filmed together, with the first season airing on September 26, 2016 and the second season airing on September 3, 2017. In a month and a half, the series garnered 6 million orders on HOT's video on demand service.

The third season was broadcast on September 22, 2019. Actors that joined this season include Orna Banai, Bat-El Borenstein and Louie Nufi.

In February 2024, the series appeared on Netflix Israel.

== Synopsis ==
Shiri Ezogi (played by Chen Sabag) is a youthful looking 30-year-old unemployed actress. She often gets into trouble, repeatedly disappointing her friends despite her good intentions. Her young appearance prevents her from getting lead and desirable roles in adult theater and she makes a living primarily from small roles and children's plays. She is in a complicated relationship with Nimrod, another actor, who one day is caught for drug possession.

A man named Assaf runs a high school that provides therapy to abused children. Assaf is suspected of having an affair with a student who became hospitalized by drug abuse. The police need an undercover agent to infiltrate this high school, so the head of the detective team, Morris, offers Shiri a deal: he will release her partner from custody and in return she must infiltrate the high school as a student and find out what really happens at school.

== Seasons ==
Series	Episodes	Originally released	
Series	Episodes	First released	Last released
1	24	26 September 2016	16 November 2016
2	25	3 September 2017	29 October 2017
3	24	22 September 2019	10 November 2019

== Awards and nominations ==
Award	Year	Category	Nominee(s)	Result	Ref.
City Mouse Award	2016	Best Original Series / Show	Metumtemet	Nominated	
Awards of the Israeli Television Academy	2016	Daily Drama	Metumtemet	Won	
Awards of the Israeli Television Academy	2016	Best Actress in a Drama Series, Daily Drama	Bat Chen Sabag	Won	
Awards of the Israeli Television Academy	2016	Best Actress in a Drama Series, Daily Drama	Shani Klein	Nominated	
Awards of the Israeli Television Academy	2016	Directing a Drama Series, Daily Drama	Metumtemet	Nominated	
Awards of the Israeli Television Academy	2016	Drama series script, daily drama	Metumtemet	Won	
Awards of the Israeli Television Academy	2016	Picture	Metumtemet	Nominated	
Awards of the Israeli Television Academy	2016	Editing (Picture)	Metumtemet	Nominated	
Awards of the Israeli Television Academy	2017	Daily Drama	Metumtemet	Won	
Awards of the Israeli Television Academy	2017	Best Actress in a Drama Series, Daily Drama	Bat Chen Sabag	Won	
Awards of the Israeli Television Academy	2017	Drama series script, daily drama	Metumtemet	Nominated	
