= Noodle (film) =

- Theatrical release poster
- נודל
- Directed by: Ayelet Menahemi
- Written by: Shemi Zarhin; Ayelet Menahemi
- Produced by: Assaf Amir; Eitan Mansuri; Elie Meirovitz; Yoav Roeh
- Starring: Mili Avital; Chen Baoqi
- Music by: Haim Frank Ilfman
- Production companies: Norma Productions; EZ Films
- Distributed by: EZ Films; United King Films
- Release date: July 26, 2007 (Israel)
- Running time: 90 minutes (South Korea, 100 minutes)
- Country: Israel
- Languages: Hebrew; Some Mandarin Chinese; Some English

Noodle (Hebrew: נודל) is a 2007 Israeli comedy-drama film directed by Ayelet Menahemi, written by Shemi Zarhin and Ayelet Menahemi, and starring Mili Avital, Chen Baoqi, and Alon Aboutboul.

== Plot ==
When the Chinese woman working in Israel for Miri Kalderon, an Israeli flight attendant, is suddenly deported for overstaying her work visa, her lack of Hebrew-language skills makes it impossible for her to convince the Israeli authorities that she has a young child with her. Miri, twice-widowed because of the ongoing Arab-Israeli conflicts, has been going through the motions of living, somehow detached from a real connection to life itself. Her decision to help reunite the child—nicknamed "Noodle"—with his mother, now back in Beijing, ends up helping her, not just the boy and his mother, in ways Miri herself could not have expected.

== Cast ==
Main cast

- Mili Avital (Miri Calderone)
- Chen Baoqi (Noodle)

Supporting characters

- Alon Aboutboul (Izzy Sason)
- Sinaya Ben-Dor (Ilana)
- Yiftach Klein (Mati Gueta)
- Daphna Shpigelman (Batya)
- Sarit Vino-Elad (Dafna)
- Anat Waxman (Gila Sason)
- Roni Yuria (Yaeli)
- Ilana Yagel/Armelle Bodiguel (Mati's ex-girlfriend in China)

== Awards ==
The film won the Best Supporting Actress Award from the Israeli Film Academy (Ophir Awards), and a Special Grand Prize of the Jury from the 2007 Montreal World Film Festival. It also won numerous other awards at film festivals throughout the United States and around the world, including the award for Best Feature Film Audience Choice Award at the 2010 Jersey Shore Film Festival.

The film was an official nominee for numerous Israeli Film Academy Awards, including Best Actress, Best Cinematography, Best Director, Best Editing, Best Film, Best Music, Best Screenplay, and Best Sound.

== Critical responses ==
As one review put it, "This Israeli film about grief and loss surprisingly takes the form of a crowd pleaser." Other reviewers agreed, noting that films like Noodle are rare, combining great stories and performances with enough "heart" to involve the audience emotionally. Ultimately, as a review from the 18th annual Tucson Jewish Film Festival put it, "The film is a touching comic-drama of two human beings accompanying each other on a remarkable journey that takes them both back to a meaningful life."

== Remake ==
A French remake entitled Cookie (2013 film) was released in 2013. The film was directed by Léa Fazer, co-written by Fazer and Benoît Graffin, and stars Alice Taglioni, Virginie Efira, Mehdi Nebbou, Philippe Lefebvre and Léo Legrand among others.
