= Zion and His Brother =

- Promotional poster
- Directed by: Eran Merav
- Written by: Eran Merav
- Produced by: Assaf Amir; Charles Gillibert; Marin Karmitz; Nathanaël Karmitz; Talia Kleinhendler; Thomas Springer; Helmut Weber
- Starring: Reuven Badalov; Ronit Elkabetz
- Cinematography: Itzik Portal
- Music by: Blake Williams; Mary Lago Williams
- Production companies: EZ Films; K5 Film; United Channel Movies
- Distributed by: Regent Releasing; Cinemax; MK2 Diffusion
- Release date: 5 August 2009
- Running time: 84 minutes
- Countries: Israel; France
- Language: Hebrew

Zion and His Brother is a French-Israeli drama film from 2009, starring Ofer Hayon, Reuven Bedlov, Ronit Elkabetz and Tzahi Grad in the lead roles. The film, written and directed by Eran Merav, premiered on 17 January 2009 at the Sundance Film Festival.

== Plot ==
Ilana (Ronit Elkabetz), a divorced mother, is raising her two sons: 17-year-old Meir (Ofer Hayon) and 14-year-old Zion (Reuven Bedalov). Sharing their modest apartment is Ilana's partner, Eli (Tzahi Grad), a car wash owner who provides financial support. The boys' father is absent, offering no assistance, and their only connection with him comes through occasional payphone conversations between Meir and his father.

Meir, a troubled and aggressive teenager, spends much of his time with a group of similarly violent friends. His relationship with his girlfriend, Michelle (Leah Lane), who lives with her grandmother in the neighborhood, is marked by contempt and aggression. Meir harbors deep resentment toward Eli, despite Eli's efforts to support him, including offering him a job at his car wash.

Zion and Meir are inseparable, spending most of their time together. One day, while swimming in the sea, Zion's sneakers are stolen. Later, he spots them on an Ethiopian boy named Solomon (Meir Samo), who refuses to give them back. Seeking help, Zion turns to Meir, who confronts Solomon with brutal force. The confrontation turns violent, and Solomon flees in fear, only to tragically be struck by a speeding train.

Michelle decides to leave Meir, and when he finds her with Zion, his rage boils over, and he threatens to kill her.

Meanwhile, Solomon's father (Meir Dassa) arrives at school, desperately asking the students if they’ve seen his son. Zion remains silent, fearful after Meir threatens him to keep quiet.

The tension between Meir and Eli reaches a breaking point when Meir sabotages Eli's car, leading to a violent physical altercation. Eli, frustrated and hurt, leaves the house but eventually returns after Zion pleads with him.

Concerned for Zion’s future, Ilana and Eli make the difficult decision to send him to a boarding school until Eli finishes constructing their new apartment on Mount Carmel. Zion begins packing his belongings, but before he can leave, Meir arrives, and a heated argument quickly spirals into a fight. Meir chases Zion to the train tracks, catching him and pinning him down. As a train approaches, Meir begins choking Zion, but suddenly stops, haunted by memories of what happened to Solomon.

== Cast ==
Actor Name	Character Name
Reuven Badalov	Zion
Ronit Elkabetz	Mother
Tzahi Grad	Eli
Zidane Awad	cousin
Ofer Hayun	Meir

== Awards and nominations ==
Ghent International Film Festival

- Best Screenplay - Eran Merav (won)
- Best Film - Eran Merav (nomination)

Sundance Film Festival

- World cinema - dramatic - Eran Merav (nomination)
