= Rama Burshtein =

American-born Israeli filmmaker

Rama Bushtein-Shai
- רמה בורשטיין שי
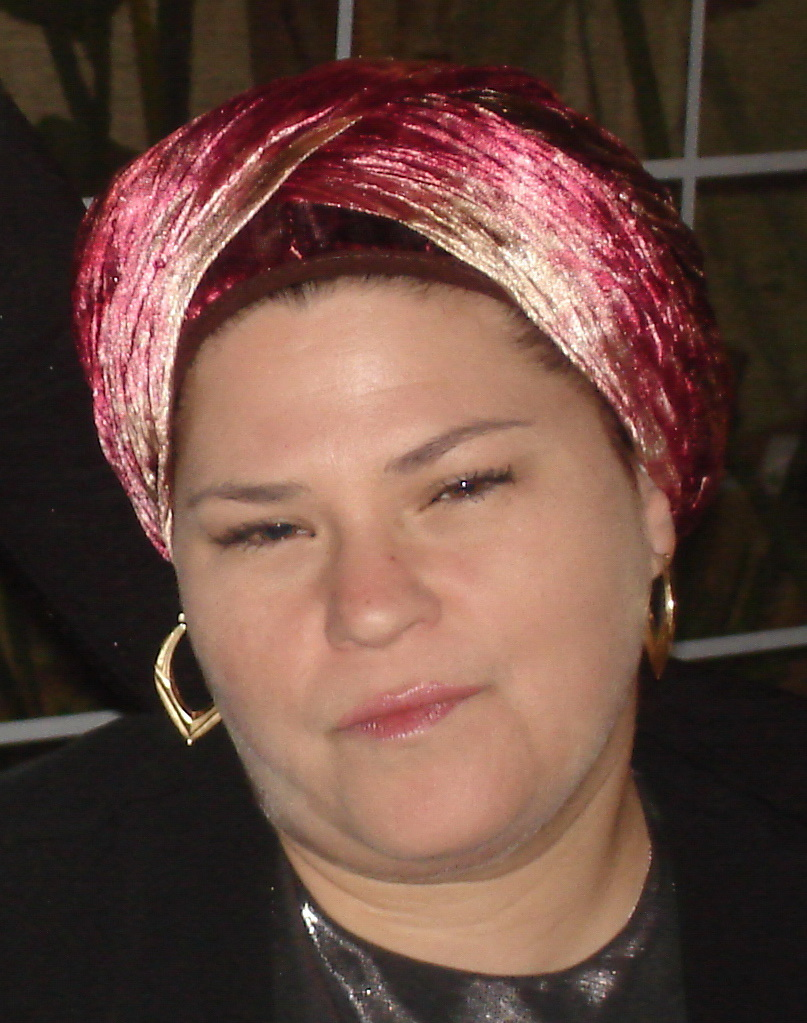
- Born: 1967 (age 58–59); New York City, U.S.
- Education: Sam Spiegel Film and Television School, Jerusalem
- Occupations: Film director, film producer, screenwriter
- Years active: 2012-the present
- Notable work: Fill the Void
- Spouse: Aharon Burshtein (divorced)
- Children: 4
- Awards: 3 Ophir Awards for directing, writing, and producing Fill the Void

Rama Burshtein-Shai (Hebrew: רמה בורשטיין שי) is an American-born Israeli filmmaker best known for her 2012 debut feature, Fill the Void.

== Early life ==
Burshtein was born in New York in 1967, and moved to Tel Aviv when she was one year old. She attended the Sam Spiegel Film and Television School in Jerusalem, graduating in 1995.

Burshtein became an Orthodox Jew when she was 25 years old.

== Career ==
Prior to Fill the Void, Burshtein was part of a collective of Orthodox Jewish women film-makers who funded, produced, directed, and wrote films for themselves.

According to Burshtein, it took her 15 years to complete her debut film, Fill the Void, with numerous delays over writing, casting, and editing. It took her a year to find actress Hadas Yaron to play the main role of Shira, and another year in post-production because of insecurities over the editing process. Fill the Void is a story about a religious Jewish woman who must decide whether or not to marry her late sister's husband.

Fill the Void premiered at the 69th Venice International Film Festival. Lead actress Hadas Yaron won the Volpi Cup for her work. Burshtein won three Ophir Awards for directing, writing, and producing for her work on the film. The film was picked up for North American distribution by Sony Pictures Classics. It was released in 2013, to great critical acclaim, receiving a score of 81 on Metacritic.

In 2013, Burshtein was invited to direct a short film in celebration of the 70th anniversary of the Venice International Film Festival. Her film, along with those of 69 other directors, was collected in a work entitled Venezia 70 - Future Reloaded, and premiered at the 70th Venice International Film Festival.

Burshtein's second film, The Wedding Plan (Through the Wall in Hebrew), was again set in an Israeli Orthodox Jewish community, about a young woman determined to still get married on the date of her planned wedding after her fiancé leaves her. The film stars Noa Koler, who won the best actress award at the 2016 Haifa International Film Festival.

In 2022 she directed the television series, Fire Dance. The Haredi drama is set in Tiberias and stars Yehuda Levi.

Burshtein has said that her productions follow Jewish law: male and female performers do not touch on screen, the crew does not work on Shabbat, and she avoids private one-on-one meetings with men on set.

== Family life ==
She has three sons and a daughter with her former husband, Aharon Burshtein. Following her divorce from Aharon, she remarried in 2020 and now goes by Rama Burshtein-Shai.

== Filmography ==
- Fill the Void (Hebrew: למלא את החלל) (2012)
- Venezia 70 - Future Reloaded (2013)
- The Wedding Plan (Hebrew: לעבור את הקיר, romanized: Through the Wall) (2016)
- Fire Dance (Hebrew: ריקוד האש) (2022)
