= What a Wonderful Place =

2005 Israeli film by Eyal Halfon

- Theatrical poster
- איזה מקום נפלא
- Directed by: Eyal Halfon
- Written by: Eyal Halfon
- Produced by: Assaf Amir; Yoav Roeh
- Starring: Uri Gavriel; Evelyn Kaplun; Avi Uria; Yossi Graber
- Cinematography: Nily Aslan
- Edited by: Einat Glaser-Zarhin
- Music by: Avi Belleli
- Release date: July 8, 2005 (Karlovy Vary International Film Festival)
- Running time: 104 minutes
- Country: Israel
- Languages: Hebrew; Filipino; Tagalog; Russian; English

What a Wonderful Place (Hebrew: איזה מקום נפלא - Eize Makom Nifla) is a 2005 Israeli drama film directed by Eyal Halfon. It includes three seemingly unrelated storylines which intersect at the end, set in southern Tel Aviv, the Arabah and an unidentified Israeli urban suburb. The film deals with issues of trafficking of women and the lives of foreign workers in Israel.

== Plot ==
The plot follows three stories that seem unrelated, that intersect in a uniform plot line. The first story takes place in South Tel Aviv, and follows Franco, a former policeman who undertakes to work for a big mobster, goes through a process of self-discovery through Zhana, an escort who is under his protection. In parallel, another plot line is underway in the fields of the southern Arava, where Seltzer, a farmer working in the Arava, tries to find Zhanna following a picture he found by chance, and has to trust one of his Thai workers in his search. The third story takes place in a housing estate in an urban suburb, where Aloni, a nature reserve inspector who leads a pursuit of foreign workers, is forced to deal with his sick father, and does this with the help of Eddie, a Filipino nurse. During the film, the viewer is exposed to the world of the foreign workers in the State of Israel.

== Cast ==
Actor Name	Character Name
Uri Gavriel	Franco
Evelyn Kaplun	Zhana
Avi Oriah	Yishai Zelzer
Yossi Gerber	Mr. Aloni
Yoav Heit	Yoav Aloni
Marina Shoyaf	Julia
Evelin Hagoel	Ahuva
Dvir Benedek	The Boss (Mafia)
Michael Rozhezki	Sergei
Michael Varshevik	the doctor
Galia Shtern	Yishai's wife
Raymond Bagastan	Adi
Eran Ivner	detective
Tzadfong Loying	Viset
Mimi Debau	Nini
Olga Titov	prostitute
Julia Menis	Tania
Julia Talis	Anna
Meiri Israel Mugbar	Omer

== Awards and nominations ==
- Ophir Awards:
  - Best Film (won)
  - Best Actor (Uri Gavriel, won)
  - Best Screenplay (Eyal Halfon, won)
  - Best Art Direction (Ido Dolev, won)
  - Best Editing (Einat Glaser-Zarhin, won)
  - Best Director (Eyal Halfon, nominated)
  - Best Actress (Evelyn Kaplun, nominated)
  - Best Supporting Actor (Avi Uria, nominated)
  - Best Supporting Actress (Marina Shoif, nominated)
  - Best Cinematography (Nily Aslan, nominated)
  - Best Costume Design (Keren Ron, nominated)
  - Best Music (Avi Belleli, nominated)
  - Best Sound (Israel David, David Lis and Aviv Aldema, nominated)
- 40th Karlovy Vary International Film Festival:
  - Crystal Globe (nominated)
  - Special Jury Prize (won)
  - Best Actor (Uri Gavriel, won)
- Festroia International Film Festival:
  - Golden Dolphin (won)
- Brooklyn International Film Festival:
  - Best Screenplay (Eyal Halfon, won)
