= Rehearsals (Israeli TV series) =

- חזרות
- Genre: Romantic comedy
- Created by: Noa Koler; Erez Drigues; Assaf Amir
- Directed by: Boaz Frankel
- Starring: Noa Koler; Erez Drigues; Agam Rudberg; Itay Turgeman
- Music by: Guy Levi
- Country of origin: Israel
- Original languages: Hebrew; English; German
- No. of seasons: 1
- No. of episodes: 10

Production
- Running time: 35 minutes
- Production company: Norma Productions

Original release
- Network: Kan 11
- Release: 12 November 2020 – 11 January 2021

Rehearsals (Hebrew: חזרות, romanized: Hazarot) is an Israeli romantic comedy television series broadcast on Kan 11 that premiered on 12 November 2020.

The series is partially based on an earlier play One + One (Hebrew: אחד + אחת) performed at the Gesher Theater in May 2010, directed by Yevgeny Aryeh. The show's creators, Noa Koler and Erez Drigues, had previously wrote and acted alongside each other in the earlier production, which was based on their lives as a former couple.

In January 2021, Kan 11 announced that the show had been renewed for a second season, but in March 2022 it was revealed that the show would be cancelled without further episodes due to Koler's withdrawal from the production.

In July 2022, it was announced that the show had been sold to Hulu for distribution in the UAE, UK, Indonesia, South Korea, the Netherlands, the Philippines, Poland, Sweden, Singapore, and Turkey.

== Plot summary ==
Iris (Noa Koler) and Tomer (Erez Drigues) are two theater writers, who after several years together are going through a difficult breakup. Moments after Tomer leaves the house, Iris receives a dramatic call — their dream project, a play they had worked on together about their relationship, has been accepted and will be staged by the largest theater in the country. Iris and Tomer are forced to struggle to salvage the work in the rehearsal room as fresh exes, alongside a pair of television stars (Agam Rudberg and Itay Turgeman) who play the main roles.

== Awards ==
The show won 8 awards at the Israeli Television Academy Awards in 2020, including Best Comedy Drama Series, Best Screenplay, Best Lead Actress in a Comedy Series (for Noa Koler), Best Supporting Actor in a Comedy Series (Itay Turgeman), and Best Supporting Actress in a Comedy Series (Agam Rudberg).
