= Nina's Tragedies =

2003 film by Savi Gabizon

- האסונות של נינה
- Directed by: Savi Gabizon
- Written by: Savi Gabizon
- Produced by: Anat Asulin; Savi Gabizon
- Starring: Ayelet Zurer; Aviv Elkabets; Alon Abutbul; Yoram Hattab
- Cinematography: David Gurfinkel
- Edited by: Tali Halter-Shenkarusic
- Music by: Assaf Amdursky and Shlomi Shaban
- Release date: 2003
- Running time: 106 minutes
- Country: Israel
- Language: Hebrew

Nina's Tragedies (Hebrew: האסונות של נינה) is a 2003 Israeli comedy-drama film written and directed by Savi Gabizon about a boy named Nadav and his aunt, Nina. The film is shown from the perspective of Nadav and tells of his experiences regarding his aunt Nina and her loss, understanding love and confronting death in his family. The film is directed by Savi Gabizon and starring Ayelet Zurer, Yoram Hattab, Aviv Elkabets, Alon Abutbul, Shmil Ben Ari, and Anat Waxman.

== Plot summary ==
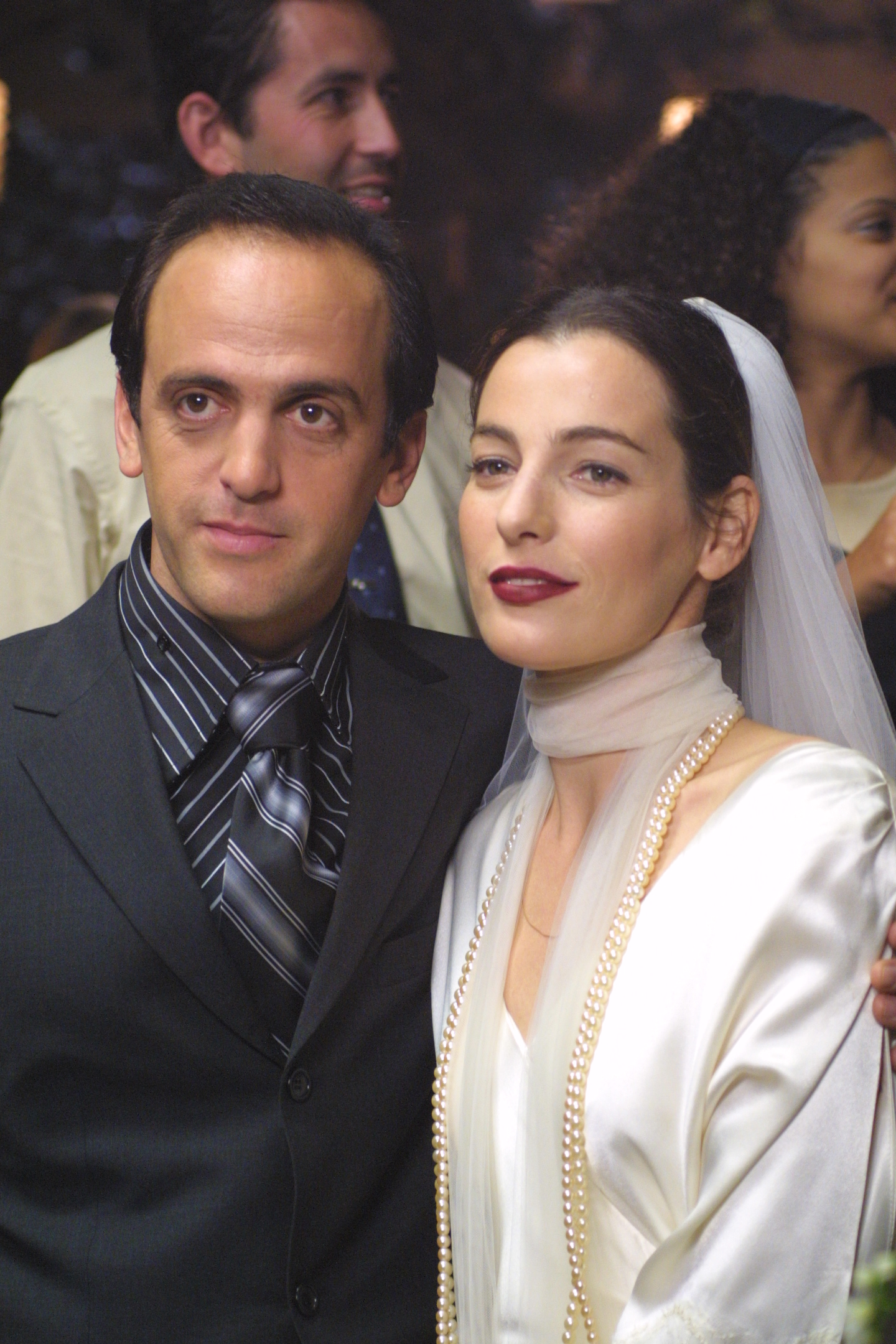
Ayelet Zurer and Yoram Hattab on the set of Nina's Tragedies

Fourteen-year-old Nadav (Elkabets) is hopelessly in love with his aunt Nina (Zurer), who has recently lost her husband (Hattab). He is caught between the two worlds of his divorced parents: his mother (Waxman) is a high-strung fashionista, while his father (Ben Ari) has recently become devoutly Orthodox and withdrawn from the family in order to join a group of Hassidic Jews who tour Tel Aviv in a van, blasting the word of God through loudspeakers.

== Cast ==
- Ayelet Zurer as Nina
- Aviv Elkabets as Nadev
- Yoram Hattab as Haimon/Alex
- Alon Abutbul as Avinoam
- Shmil Ben Ari as Amnon
- Dov Navon as Menachem
- Anat Waxman as Alona
- Gili Shushan as Rafi
- Evgenia Dodina as Galina
- Osnat Fishman as Lihi
- Shmuel Edelman as Shlomi
- Asher Sarfati as Army Commander

== Reception ==
On Review Aggregator Rotten Tomatoes the film holds an approval rating of 61% based on 31 reviews. Metacritic assigns a weighted average score of 61 out of 100 based on 19 reviews from mainstream critics, indicating "generally favorable" reviews.

Time Out commended the film saying that it "Although some of his plot devices strain at times, Gavizon demonstrates a palpable tenderness for human shortcomings of all kinds". Scott Tobias of The A.V. Club also broadly enjoyed the film, saying "Savi Gabizon's minor-key coming-of-age drama Nina's Tragedies isn't as accomplished as the others, but it's sensitive enough to breathe fresh life into its small group of forlorn characters".

Slant Magazine's Nick Schager gave the film 2.5 stars out of 4 stating: "[...] Gavison's tragicomedy is modest in scope but not necessarily ambition, a small story of familial ups and downs that achieves a tender, jagged whimsicality through its dedication to idiosyncratic character development and quirky coincidences." Scott Foundas of Variety was less enthusiastic, however, describing the film as "an amiable, but cluttered dramedy".

Some reviewers, such as Stephen Holden of The New York Times, criticized the character Nadev as being underdeveloped. Holden called Nadev the film's "biggest weakness" and that "he remains a poker-faced cipher, darting from one scene to the next without emerging as either a person or a coherent point of view. His shadowy presence leaves the movie without a solid center around which to spin its tales". Schager likewise criticized the character, describing him as a "hoary framing device" whose " [...] featureless construction acts like a deadweight on the otherwise buoyant film".

The film has won 11 Israeli Academy Awards.
