= 40th Karlovy Vary International Film Festival =

2005 Czech film festival edition

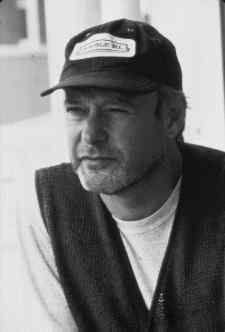
Michael Radford, Grand Jury President

The 40th Karlovy Vary International Film Festival took place from 1 to 9 July 2005. The Crystal Globe was won by My Nikifor, a Polish drama film directed by Krzysztof Krauze. The second prize, the Special Jury Prize was won by What a Wonderful Place, an Israeli drama film directed by Eyal Halfon. English film director and screenwriter Michael Radford was the Grand Jury President of the festival.

== Juries ==
The following people formed the juries of the festival:

Main competition

- Michael Radford, Grand Jury President (UK)
- Frédéric Fonteyne (Belgium)
- Ali MacGraw (USA)
- Fernando Méndez - Laite Serrano (Spain)
- Kornél Mundruczó (Hungary)
- Ruba Nadda (Canada)
- Zuzana Stivínová (Czech Republic)

Documentaries

- David Fisher, Chairman (Israel)
- John Appel (Netherlands)
- Flavia de la Fuente (Argentina)
- Jana Hádková (Czech Republic)
- Ninos Fenec Mikelides (Greece)

East of the West

- Andrej Plachov, Chairman (Russia)
- Jannike Åhlund (Sweden)
- Mira Erdevicki (UK)
- Viera Langerová (Slovenia)
- Roland Rust (Germany)

== Official selection awards ==
The following feature films and people received the official selection awards:

- Crystal Globe (Grand Prix) – My Nikifor (Mój Nikifor) by Krzysztof Krauze (Poland)
- Special Jury Prize – What a Wonderful Place (Eize makom nifla) by Eyal Halfon (Israel)
- Best Director Award – Krzysztof Krauze for My Nikifor (Poland)
- Best Actress Award – Krystyna Feldman for My Nikifor (Poland)
- Best Actor Award (ex aequo):
  - Luca Zingaretti for Come into the Light (Alla luce del sole) (Italy)
  - Uri Gavriel for What a Wonderful Place (Eize makom nifla) (Israel)
- Special Jury Mention: Noriko's Dinner Table (Noriko no shokutaku) by Sion Sono (Japan)

== Other statutory awards ==
Other statutory awards that were conferred at the festival:

- Best documentary film (over 30 min.) – Estamira by Marcos Prado (Brazil)
  - Special mention – Mad Hot Ballroom by Marilyn Agrelo
- Best documentary film (under 30 min.) – Boža moj by Galina Adamovich (Belarus)
- East of the West Award – Ragin by Kirill Serebrennikov (Russia / Austria)
  - Special Mention – The Wedding (Wesele) by Wojtek Smarzowski (Poland)
- Crystal Globe for Outstanding Artistic Contribution to World Cinema – Robert Redford, Liv Ullmann, Sharon Stone
- Audience Award – La vie avec mon père by Sébastien Rose (Canada)

== Non-statutory awards ==
The following non-statutory awards were conferred at the festival:

- FIPRESCI International Critics Award: Chinaman (Kinamand), by Henrik Ruben Genz (China / Denmark)
- Don Quixote Award: Noriko No Shokutaku (Japan), by Sion Sono
- Ecumenical Jury Award: Chinaman (Kinamand), by Henrik Ruben Genz (China / Denmark)
- Young Czech Critics Award: The Butterflies Are Just a Step Behind (Parvaneha badraghe mikonand), by Mohammad Ebrahim Moaiery (Iran)
- Czech TV Award (Independent Camera): Los muertos, by Lisandro Alonso (Argentina)
