= Life According to Agfa =

1992 Israeli film

- Film poster
- החיים על פי אגפא
- Directed by: Assi Dayan
- Written by: Assi Dayan
- Produced by: Rafi Bukai; Yoram Kislev; Assaf Amir
- Starring: Gila Almagor
- Cinematography: Yoav Kosh
- Edited by: Zohar Sela
- Music by: Naftali Alter
- Release date: 10 September 1993 (TIFF)
- Running time: 100 minutes
- Country: Israel
- Language: Hebrew

Life According to Agfa (Hebrew: החיים על פי אגפא) is a 1993 Israeli psychological-social drama film written and directed by Assi Dayan and produced by Rafi Bukai and Yoram Kislev. Starring Gila Almagor, Shmil Ben Ari, Irit Frank, Shuli Rand, Sharon Alexander and Avital Dicker, the film revolves around one night in a small Tel Aviv pub whose employees and patrons represent a microcosm of Israeli society – men and women, Jews and Arabs, Ashkenazi and Sephardi Jews, kibbutzniks and city-dwellers.

The film mainly is criticizing the themes across the Israeli society, and, predicts a somewhat apocalyptic future for mankind and Israeli society. The film was selected as the Israeli entry for the Best Foreign Language Film at the 65th Academy Awards, but was not accepted as a nominee.

== Plot ==
Dalia (Gila Almagor), an older woman in her late forties, who ends each night with guys she gathers for a casual sex. Dalia is at a large Tel Aviv pub called "Barbie", which is an abbreviation of the name of the "Abarbanel" mental institution. Samir (Akram Talawi) works in the pub. The pub opens in the early evening, as every day. Nimi (Sharon Alexander), a lieutenant colonel who was wounded in a parachute, arrives with his soldiers at the pub. The group of soldiers is loud and beastly. At the same time, Ricky (Avital Dicker), a depressed girl, arrives by chance after her psychiatrist advised her not to be left alone so that she would not expire on her own.

She is harassed by Nimmi and a group of his soldiers, who treat her sexually blatantly. Benny (Shuli Rand) the cop manages to keep the gang away from Ricky, and the two go out to his apartment, not before he cuts the tires of Nimi's car and his gang. After they have sex, Benny leaves Ricky in his apartment, and returns to the pub, where he draws the soldiers' attention to the puncture in their machine, but does not reveal to them that he himself is responsible for the puncture.

Nimi and his gang get upset, and directly suspect Samir, the Arab worker in the kitchen. When the soldiers open with violent acts made by Samir, Benny prevents the commotion and sends the group home in a taxi. Nimi instructs the driver to take the soldiers to the base. After the riot ends, Benny and his partner embark on an operation to capture drug dealers. When he returns his partner and roommate Liora (Irit Frank), a waitress in the pub, unaware of his betrayal, is angry at him for leaving the injured Ricky in his apartment alone, but he is more preoccupied with the fact that the operation he planned failed, and returns to his apartment, where he finds Ricky and a teacher let her vacate the apartment.

While Benny is taking a shower, Ricky commits suicide by jumping out of a window. Benny does not notice Ricky's body, and returns to the pub. Levy (Shmil Ben-Ari), Moshe (Uri Klausner) and Malka (Rivka Neumann), a violent and rude bunch arrive at the pub, and treat the pub people with contempt, and especially Samir.

A violent confrontation ensued between Levy and Samir, which ended, again, so that the groups were thrown out by Benny. Eli (Ezra Kafri), the married partner of the pub's manager, Dalia, arrives at the pub with his wife in order to say goodbye to Medalia, who remains in pain, and consoles herself with Ralph (Yoav Dekelbaum), a UN soldier who happened to have her. Liora Benny decides to comply with the ultimatum given to him by his commander and move to serve in the periphery.

== Production and Awards ==
Filming for the movie began in March 1992, with a grant of $300,000 from the Israeli Film Fund and a grant from the Israel Broadcasting Authority. Filming was completed in June 1992, and the film was released in theaters in September.

Life According to Agfa is considered one of the most important and successful films of director Shmuel (Mooli) Dayan. At a time when cinema attendance was declining due to the influence of television, the film enjoyed significant commercial success, selling approximately 350,000 tickets in Israel. The film also won 9 Ophir Awards and was nominated for the Golden Bear at the Berlin Film Festival, where Dayan received special mention for direction. The film was praised for its themes, its critique of Israeli society, and the massacre scene at the end of the film, which the Israeli Film Fund had requested to be removed.

The film was submitted as Israel’s candidate for the Golden Globe Award for Best Foreign Language Film, and later for the Academy Award for Best International Feature Film, but it was not selected as one of the five final nominees. This occurred despite promotional assistance from Arnon Milchan in Hollywood.

== Cast ==
- Gila Almagor as Daliah
- Akram Tillawi as Samir
- Smadar Kilchinsky as Daniela
- Sharon Alexander as Nimi
- Shmil Ben Ari as Levi
- Avital Dicker as Ricky
- Irit Frank as Liora
- Ezra Kafri as Eli
- Dani Litani as Czerniak
- Barak Negbi as Sammy
- Rivka Neumann as Malka
- Shuli Rand as Benny

== Critical reception ==
Life According to Agfa received near-unanimous critical acclaim, winning an Ophir Award for Best Film, and did moderately well at the box office. The film also received Honourable Mentions at the Jerusalem and Berlin Film Festivals, and was entered for the film festivals in Toronto, Montpellier, Calcutta, and Singapore.

Dubbed by Judd Ne'eman a "stylized nightmare of self-annihilation", it has since become one of Israeli cinema's most important films.

== See also ==
- List of submissions to the 65th Academy Awards for Best Foreign Language Film
- List of Israeli submissions for the Academy Award for Best Foreign Language Film
