= Assaf Amdursky =

Israeli musical artist

Assaf Amdursky אסף אמדורסקי
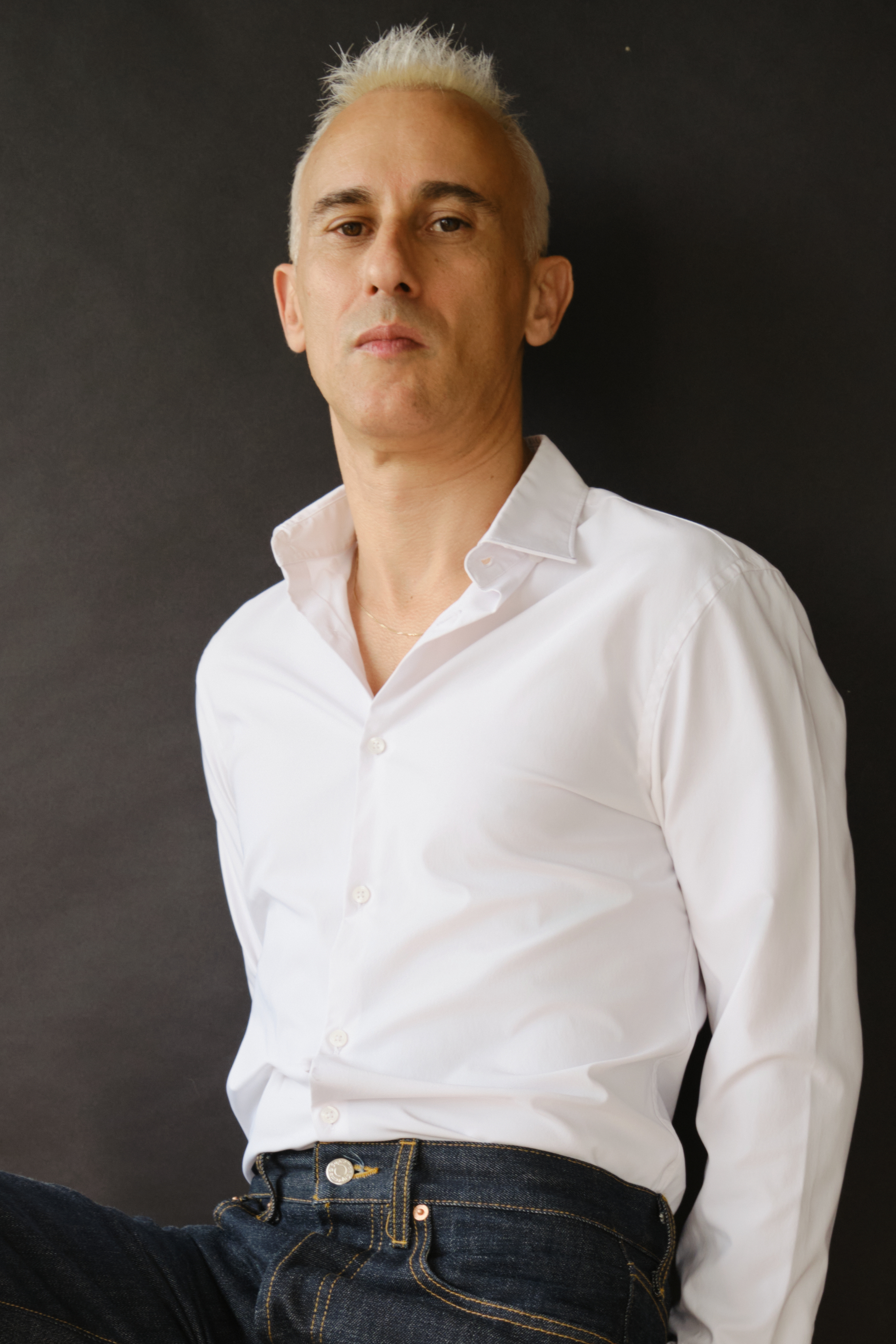

Background information
- Born: January 30, 1971 (age 55); Tel Aviv, Israel
- Origin: Israel
- Genres: Rock; electronic
- Occupations: Singer, songwriter and music producer
- Instruments: Guitar, keyboards, percussion, bass, harmonica, and trumpet

Assaf Amdursky (Hebrew: אסף אמדורסקי; born January 30, 1971) is an Israeli singer, songwriter and music producer.

== Biography ==
Assaf Amdursky was born in Tel Aviv. He is the son of folksinger Benny Amdursky. Amdursky was married for 12 years to singer-songwriter Michal Amdursky, who came out with a solo album after her divorce. Their daughter Milla was born in 2002. His family member (his uncle's granddaughter) is the singer Keren Peles.

== Music career ==
Amdursky plays guitar, keyboard, percussion, bass, harmonica and trumpet and feels "equally comfortable with rock, pop and dance music."

Amdursky began his career with the band "Ta'arovet Escot" with Amir "Jango" Rusianu and Yirmi Kaplan. They released an album in 1991. After the band broke up, all of its members pursued solo careers. Amdursky's first eponymous solo album was released in 1994. He wrote and composed most of the songs, including Yekirati (My Darling")and Ahava Khadasha (New Love). The album was re-mastered and re-released with bonus tracks in 2008.

His second album, also eponymous, was released in 1996. On it he experimented with more keyboard-oriented arrangements and longer tracks. The songs Hashamayim Hakkhulim (The Blue Sky) and Hu He'emin La (He Believed Her) became hits. In 1999 Amdursky published his album Menoim Shketim (Silent Engines) with the hit songs 15 minutes and Khalom Kehe, which featured a recorded monologue of musician Inbal Perlmuter. The album went gold. It also included a duo with Eviatar Banai in the closing song Ahava... (Love...). During the mid-1990s, Amdursky moved to the United States to pursue a DJ and dance music production career. He teamed up with Friburn & Urik to produce a remix for their debut single "You Got My Love" on Sub Culture Records.With production partner Omri Anghel, he formed "Hard Attack." The duo released their first single on the Jellybean Recordings Label, "Set Me Free", which immediately climbed its way up to the top-20 Billboard Dance Music chart.

From 1999 to 2002, Amdursky released a number of remixes and original tracks as a producer, in collaboration with Israeli producer Haim Laroz. Back in Israel, Amdursky released a live album in 2000, which documents a live show with a new electronic version to his earlier songs. In 2000 he was awarded the Israeli Singer of the Year award (the Tamuz Prize), and the Album of the Year award for Silent Engines.

In 2005, he produced Kadima Akhora (Forth and Back) – a double cover album, which interprets 1980s Israeli songs with a touch of electronic music.

Amdursky's self-released studio album Harei At (Thou Art), released in 2008, also went gold. It combined 11 new rock, pop, and jazz style songs, all dealing with love and partnerships.

His next album Tsad Alef (Side A) was released in 2011, and included one song with lyrics by David Avidan, and collaborations with guest singers Tom Darom, Rona Kenan and Karni Postel.

Amdursky also worked as the music producer on the movies Nina's Tragedies (2003), Ahava Columbianit (2004), and Lost Islands (2008). For the latter he received the Ophir Award.

Amdursky was the primary composer for Metumtemet, which was broadcast from 2016-2019 on HOT.

In 2019, he performed as part of the "Menashe Forests" festival alongside Ella Ronen, Abigail Kovari, and others.

Amdursky serves on the panel of judges of the television singing competition, HaKokhav HaBa.

Awards
Preceded by	Israeli Singer of the Year Award (Tamuz Prize); 2000	Succeeded by David D'Or
