= The Wedding Plan =

2016 film by Rama Burshtein

- Theatrical release poster
- Hebrew: לעבור את הקיר
- Directed by: Rama Burshtein
- Written by: Rama Burshtein
- Produced by: Assaf Amir
- Starring: Noa Koler; Amos Tamam; Oz Zehavi; Dafi Alpern; Roni Merhavi; Irit Sheleg
- Cinematography: Amit Yasour
- Edited by: Yael Hersonski
- Music by: Roy Edri
- Production company: Norma Productions
- Distributed by: Norma Productions
- Release dates: 1 September 2016 (Venice); 27 October 2016 (Israel)
- Running time: 110 minutes
- Country: Israel
- Language: Hebrew

The Wedding Plan (Hebrew: לעבור את הקיר, romanized: Laavor et hakir, lit. 'Through the Wall') is a 2016 Israeli romantic comedy film written and directed by Rama Burshtein. The film premiered at the 73rd Venice International Film Festival in the Horizons section.

Noa Koler won the Best Actress award in the category Israeli Feature Films at the Haifa International Film Festival 2016. It was released in Israel on 27 October 2016 and in the United States on 12 May 2017 to mostly positive reviews.

== Plot ==
Michal is an unwed Orthodox Jewish woman in her early 30s. After over a decade of unsuccessful matches, Michal goes to a fortune teller and admits she wants to love and be loved. The woman tells Michal that her dreams will come true, and also tells Michal that her son, Shimi, runs a wedding hall in Jerusalem promising her a discount if she marries there.

Sometime later, Michal and her husband-to-be, Gidi, are at the tasting for their wedding. Sensing his discomfort Michal asks her fiancé to tell her what is wrong and he confesses that he does not love her. She decides to break off the engagement. After talking to her family and realizing that she cannot go through another decade of uncertainty, Michal decides to go through with renting the hall and to continue to prepare for her marriage as planned without her original fiancé, leaving it up to God to decide on a groom.

Michal goes on a series of increasingly unsuccessful dates: first with a man who has taken a vow not to look at anyone who is not his wife, next with a deaf man who becomes angered that she only agreed to see him after falling into despair, and he senses she is flirting with his sign language interpreter. Michal later makes the pilgrimage to the grave of Rebbe Nachman of Breslov where she is overcome with grief and cries aloud that she cannot feel God. The grave of Rabbi Nachman where she has been praying is separated between men and women, and a man on the other side of the barrier overhears Michal and asks her if she is alright. The man reveals himself outside the grave to be Yoss, an Israeli pop star who Michal is a fan of. During their conversation Michal reveals that she is planning to get married on the last day of Hanukkah but has yet to find a groom and invites Yoss to her wedding.

On her return from her trip, Yoss surprises Michal by dropping by her apartment unannounced, and asks her to marry him, but Michal rejects him, believing that he is not serious. As the date of her wedding approaches and no groom presents himself, she begins to panic after more unpleasant dates and tries to reconnect with Yoss, even proposing to him, but he kindly rejects her.

The night before her wedding, Michal is filled with conflicting emotions as her mother doubts her completely, yet her sister and friends begin to have faith. The wedding party travels to the wedding hall where the guests wait in discomfort for something to happen. Shimi finally appears and asks Michal to marry him. Initially believing that she is hallucinating and later that Shimi is only acting out of pity, Michal agrees to marry Shimi after he reminds her of the first time they met; not at the taste test for her wedding, but at his mother's house.

== Reception ==
Gary Goldstein of the Los Angeles Times praised the performances and characterized the film as a "unusually involving, you-are-there experience". According to Goldstein, the label "romantic comedy" does not cover all of the nuances of the film.

== Cast ==
- Noa Koler as Michal
- Amos Tamam as Shimi
- Oz Zehavi as Yoss
- Dafi Alpern as Noam, Michal's sister
- Roni Merhavi as Feigi
- Irit Sheleg as Sosh, Michal's mother
- Erez Drigues as Gidi
- Udi Persi as Ronen (blind date)
- Yonatan Rozen as Alon (deaf blind date)
- Odelia Mora-Matalon as Shimi's mother
