= Noa Koler =

Israeli actress (born 1981)

- נועה קולר
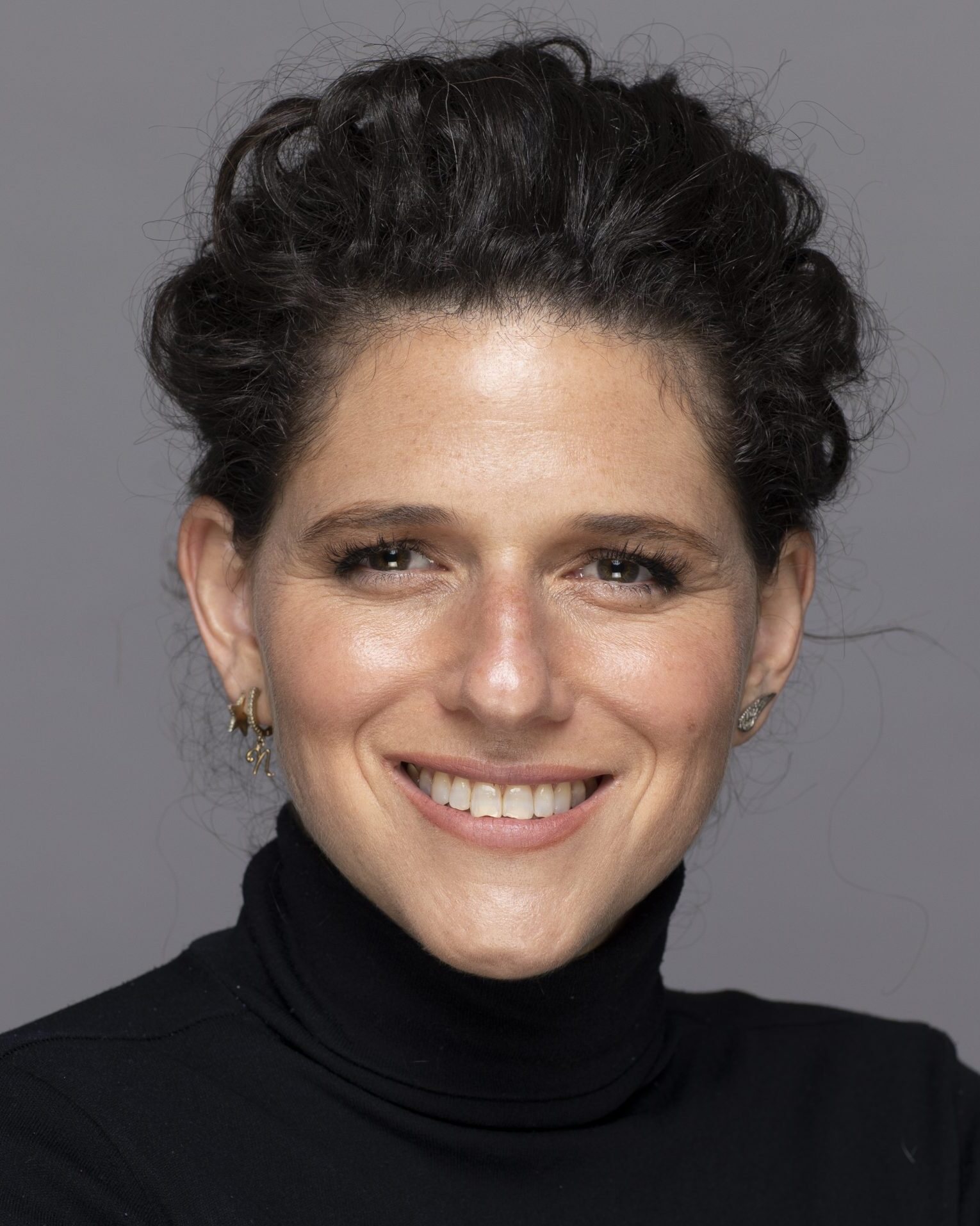
- Born: 24 June 1981 (age 45); Petah Tikva, Israel
- Education: Yoram Loewenstein Performing Arts Studio
- Occupation: Actress

Noa Koler (Hebrew: נועה קולר; born 24 June 1981) is an Israeli actress. She has received numerous accolades, including an Ophir Award for Best Actress in The Wedding Plan (2016).

== Early life ==
Koler was born and raised in Petah Tikva in Israel. Her mother, Hana, is a literature teacher and her father, Ze'ev, works as an administrator in the Israel Land Administration. For her military service with the Israel Defense Forces, she served as an instructor for the Liaison Officers course.

After her military service, she studied acting through workshops at the Nisan Nativ Acting Studio. She later graduated in 2006 from a three-year program at the Yoram Loewenstein Performing Arts Studio.

== Personal life ==
Koler was previously in a relationship with her Rehearsals co-star Erez Drigues. In September 2024, she joined other Israeli actors in a video calling for the release of the Israeli hostages in the Gaza Strip.

== Filmography ==
Year	Title	Role	Notes
2007	Tom Avni 24/7		1 episode
2008	Altalena	Zipora	3 episodes
2011	The Promise	Sal'it	4 episodes
2012	Ma Nishtanah		Short
2012	Maasiya Urbanit (Urban Tale)	Phone operator	Film
2012–2013	Mishpacha Lo Bocharim (You Can't Choose Your Family)	Noa Baron	
2013	Youth	Esti	Film
2013–2014	HaShminiya	Hamotal	16 episodes
2013-2016	Bilti Hafich (Irreversible)	Reut	3 episodes
2014	The Parliament	Nurit	1 episode
2014	Daniel	Alma	Short
2014	Antilopot	Dorit the Teacher	Shot
2014-2018	Schuna (The Hood)	Stavit	10 episodes
2016	Der Tel-Aviv-Krimi	Secretary Tali	1 episode
2016	Confess	Dona	1 episode
2016	Lice	Dalia	Shot
2016	The Wedding Plan	Michal	
2016	Ewa	Racheli (voice)	
2017	Bayit Bagalil (Outdoors)	Yaara	Film
2017-2021	Tzafoof (Cramped)	Michal	8 episodes
2018	Kacha Ze	Maya	1 episode
2018	Lo Hakol Varod (Not What You Think)	Tom's sister	1 episode
2018	HaRoman Sheli Im Daesh (My Affair with ISIS)	Tom's sister	1 episode
2018	HaMenatzeah (The Conductor)	Dolly	10 episodes
2018	Le'Heir et Ha'dov (Sleeping Bears)	Hadas	6 episodes
2018	Oshri		Short
2018-2023	Checkout (Kupa Rashit)	Shira	81 episodes
2019	SHHHH	Mother	Short
2019	Mechila (Forgiveness)		Film
2019	Our Boys	Devora	10 episodes
2019-2020	Shabas	Miri	13 episodes
2020	The Death of Cinema and My Father Too	Zohar	Film
2020	Possessions	Esti	6 episodes
2020-2021	Rehearsals (Hazarot)	Iris	10 episodes
2020-2021	HaBe'er (The Well)	Ilana	6 episodes
2021	Backyard Camping	Carmen	Short
2022	Fire Dance	Reyzi	5 episodes
2022	You Should've Heard of Us	Naomi Shemer	1 episode
2024	Halisa	Sarah	Film
2024	Like Ashes in Your Coffee	Mrs Segal	Film
