= Yana's Friends =

- Directed by: Arik Kaplun
- Written by: Arik Kaplun; Simon Vinokur
- Produced by: Anat Bikel; Moshe Levinson; Marek Rozenbaum; Uri Sabag
- Starring: Evelyn Kaplun; Nir Levy; Shmil Ben Ari; Mosko Alkalai; Dalia Friedland
- Cinematography: Valentin Belonogov
- Edited by: Einat Glaser-Zarhin
- Music by: Avi Benjamin
- Distributed by: Friends of Film (U.S.)
- Release date: November 4, 1999 (Israel)
- Running time: 90 minutes
- Country: Israel
- Languages: Hebrew; Russian

Yana's Friends (Hebrew: החברים של יאנה, romanized: HaHaverim shel Yana) is a 1999 Israeli film directed by Arik Kaplun. script editor: Savi Gabizon. Critically acclaimed, it won 10 Israeli Academy Awards including the Ophir Award for Best Picture. It also won the Crystal Globe at the 34th Karlovy Vary International Film Festival in 1999. The film has a very rare 100% rating on the film website Rotten Tomatoes based on 30 reviews, with an average rating of 7.16/10. The site's consensus reads: "A heartwarming movie that handles some weighty subjects with humor".

== Plot ==
The story follows two Russian immigrant families living in the same building as Eli (portrayed by Nir Levy), a film student preparing to leave Israel to pursue his studies in New York.

One of the families consists of Yana (portrayed by Evelyn Kaplun) and her husband, Fima (portrayed by Israel Demidov), who are also Eli's roommates. At the start of the film, Fima abruptly abandons Yana, fleeing to Russia and leaving her pregnant and burdened with his debts. As Yana struggles to navigate her new reality, a romance gradually develops between her and Eli, unfolding against the tense backdrop of the First Gulf War.

The second family includes Elik (portrayed by Vladimir Fridman) and Mila (portrayed by Lena Sakhnova), their infant son, and Mila's paralyzed grandfather, Yitzhak. Facing financial difficulties, Elik and Mila send Yitzhak—adorned with his wartime medals—to beg for money near a street musician named Yuri (portrayed by Shamil Ben Ari). Elik believes that Yitzhak will receive more donations from people passing by positioning himself among musicians, as he appears to be one of them.

Meanwhile, an old romance rekindles between Yitzhak and the building’s landlord, Rosa (portrayed by Dahlia Friedland).

As the film progresses, the characters' seemingly separate paths intersect in unexpected and deeply moving ways, revealing the shared struggles, hopes, and resilience of immigrants forging new lives in Israel.

== Cast ==
- Evelyn Kaplun as Yana
- Nir Levi as Eli
- Shmil Ben Ari as Yuri
- Mosko Alkalai as Yitzhak
- Dalia Friedland as Rosa
- Vladimir Friedman as Alik
- Israel Damidov as Pima
- Dina Doron as Luba
- Lena Sachanova as Mila
- Jenya Fisher as Adik
- Anna Finshtein as Mia
- Evyatar Lazar as Daniel
- Lucy Dubinchik as Yuri’s daughter

== Rewards ==
In the year of its release, the film competed in the Ophir Awards and won ten categories, including cinematography, directing, editing, screenplay, acting (for Evelyn Kaplun, Nir Levi, Mosko Alkalai, and Dalia Friedland), and Best Film of 1999.

The film achieved immense success in Israel and internationally, winning special awards at the Jerusalem Film Festival, in Portugal, the "Crystal Globe" award at the Karlovy Vary Film Festival in the Czech Republic, and awards in Montpellier, the United States, Italy, Russia, and the Philippines. It also participated in festivals in France, China, Canada, and Germany, and was distributed in the United States and Europe after its awards.
