= Nir Bergman =

Israeli screenwriter and film director

- ניר ברגמן
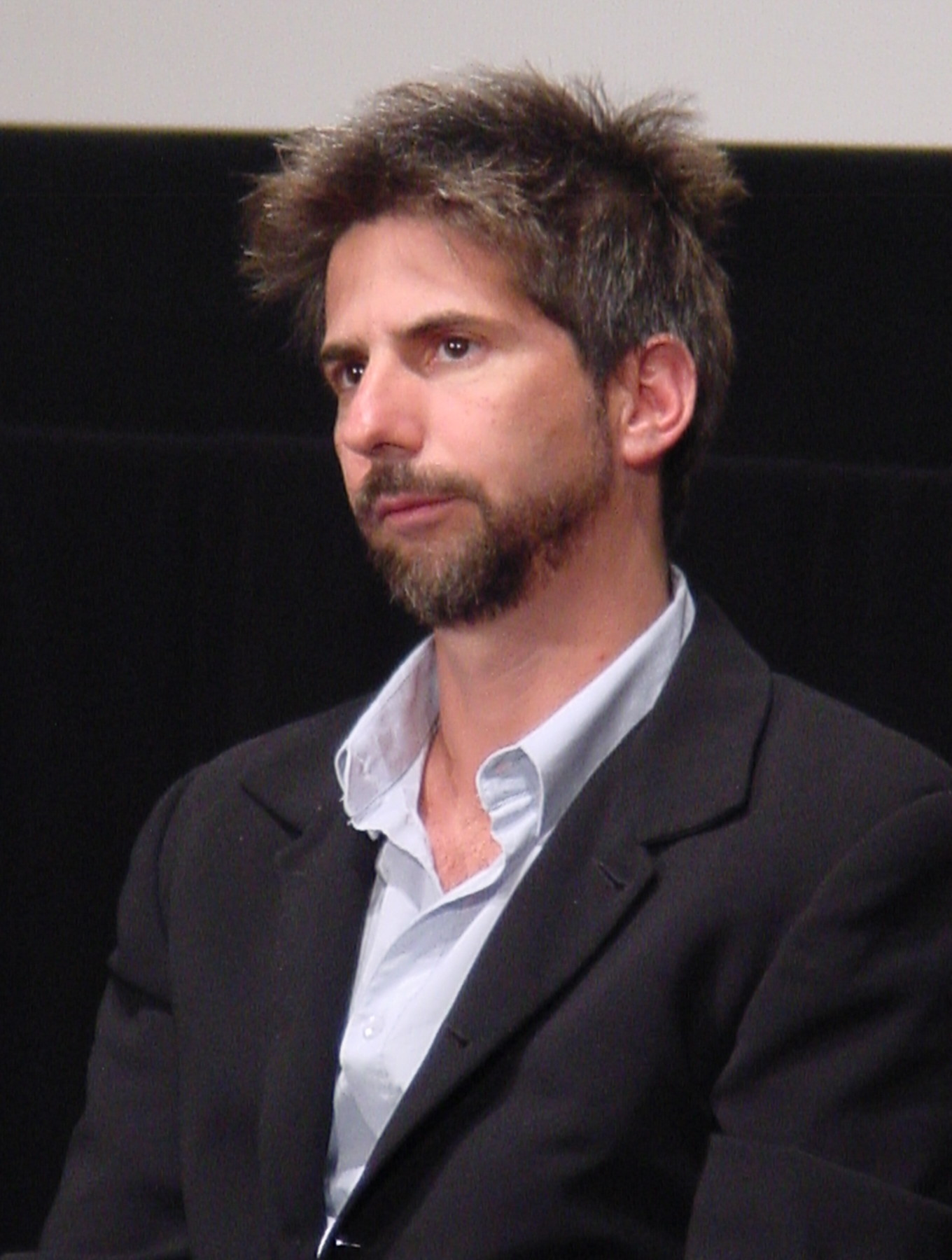
- Born: 8 August 1969 (age 57); Haifa, Israel
- Education: Sam Spiegel Film and Television School
- Occupations: Film director Screenwriter
- Years active: 1997-present

Nir Bergman (Hebrew: ניר ברגמן; born 8 August 1969) is an Israeli film director and screenwriter. He won several awards for his films including the Grand Prix at the Tokyo International Film Festival for Broken Wings (2002) and Intimate Grammar (2010).

== Biography ==
Bergman was born in the Neve Sha'anan neighborhood of Haifa, and grew up in the village of Ein Hod. In 1993, he began studying film at the Sam Spiegel School. During his studies, he directed and wrote a short film called "Yomit" (1997) and another short film called "Seahorses" (1998), which tells the story of a broken family. The film deals with autobiographical elements from Bergman's life. "Seahorses" won several international awards, including at festivals in Poland, Munich, and Greece. The film was later selected in a special competition, in which Paul Newman and Pedro Almodóvar also served as judges, as the best film ever made at Sam Spiegel. As part of his studies, he produced and shot several films. He graduated in 1998.

== Career ==
In 2000, he began writing for Channel 2 the television series "Capture the Sky."

In 2002, he directed and wrote the film "Broken Wings." The film, which tells the story of a broken family lacking a father figure, is essentially an expanded and more developed version of "Seahorses." At the center of the plot are Dafna (Orly Silbersatz-Banai) and Maya (Maya Maron) Ullman, a mother and daughter who are trying to get their family, mourning the death of their father, back on its feet. With both playing the role of mother, the two experience significant emotional upheavals. "Broken Wings" won awards at the prestigious Berlin International Film Festival, at festivals in Tokyo, in the United States, at the Toronto International Film Festival and at the Cannes Film Festival in France, most of which were awarded to Bergman himself. At the Ophir Awards ceremony that year, it won nine awards, including for acting (Maron and Banai), cinematography, editing, screenplay and direction for Bergman himself. The film was screened in theaters in the United States, France, the United Kingdom, and 20 other countries.

In 2003, he began directing and writing the television series "Jerusalem mixed grill" (Me'urav Yerushalmi), starring Arieh Elias and Sara von Schwarze. The series won several awards at the Israeli Television Academy Awards.

In 2005, he directed and wrote, together with a team of directors and screenwriters, including Hagai Levi (who initiated and produced the series) and Ori Sivan, the television series "BeTipul", starring Assi Dayan. Bergman wrote and directed the episodes of Ayala (Maya Maron), a girl who experiences personal difficulties that lead to a suicide attempt. In the same year, 2005, he was appointed head of the drama department of Israel Channel 10.

Bergman was a selected artist of the Foundation for Excellence in Culture for 2007. In 2007, he wrote and directed the series "Letting Out the Dog", which aired on Hot 3. In 2009, he directed the drama series "Towers in the Air," which aired on Channel 10.

In 2010, his film "Intimate Grammar" won the Hajj Prize at the Jerusalem Film Festival and the "Sakura Grand Prix" at the Tokyo International Film Festival.

In 2014, his film "Yona", about the life of Yona Wallach, was released in theaters. The screenplay was written together with Dita Geri, and directed by Bergman. The film stars Naomi Lvov, Michael Moshonov, Shalom Michaelashvili, Tom Hagai, Itamar Rothschild.

In 2017, his film "Saving Netta" was released, based on Eran Bar-Gil's book "Iron"[13], starring Benny Avni, Rotem Abuhav, Neta Riskin, Irit Kaplan, and Naama Aralaki.

In 2020, his film "Here We Are" was released, which won four Ophir Awards, including Best Director. The film was invited to participate in the Cannes Film Festival, but the festival was canceled.

In 2023, he directed the comedy-drama series Six Zeros for Kan 11, written by Noya Oren, starring Roni Daloomi, Shani Klein, Ofer Hayon, Laura Rivlin, Shlomo Bar-Aba, Elisha Banai, and Rotem Keinan. The series won the Israeli Film Academy Award. On December 2, 2024, it was announced that the series had been sold to Netflix and would be broadcast to its subscribers in the United States, Latin America, and Europe.

In 2024, he won the Best Director award at the Black Nights Film Festival in Tallinn, Estonia, for his film Pink Lady.

== Family ==
His older sister Ronit was the lead singer of the band "Plastic Venus".

== Selected filmography ==
Year	Title	Notes
2002	Broken Wings	
2010	Intimate Grammar	
2014	Yona	
2020	Here We Are	
2024	Pink Lady	
