= Uri Gavriel =

Israeli actor

- אורי גבריאל
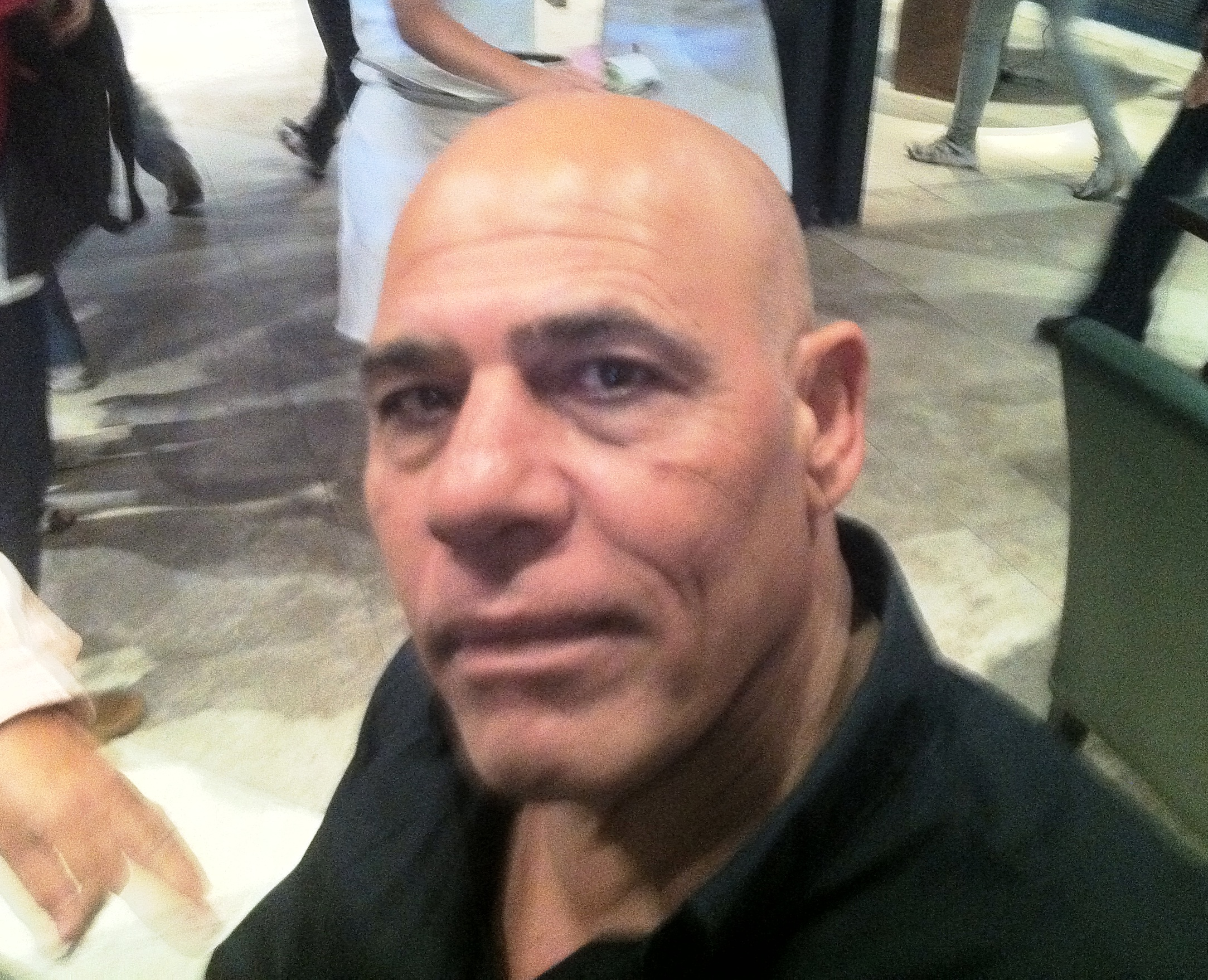
- Gavriel in 2011
- Born: 3 April 1955 (age 71); Magdiel, Israel
- Occupation: Actor
- Years active: 1982–present

Uri Gavriel (Hebrew: אורי גבריאל; born 3 April 1955) is an Israeli actor. Winner of the Ophir Award and Karlovy Vary International Film Festival in 2005 as Best Actor in film What a Wonderful Place. In 2018, he appeared as Philip the Apostle in Helen Edmundson's film Mary Magdalene.

== Early life ==
Gavriel was born in Magdiel, Israel, to Mizrahi Jewish immigrant parents from Iraq.

== Filmography ==
List of film and television credits
Year	Title	Role	Notes
1983	Hanna K.	Airport Barman	
1986	The Delta Force	Jamil Rafai	
1991	The Human Shield	Tanzi	
1992	The Finest Hour	Enemy Commander	
1992	Sipurei Tel-Aviv	Roshko	
1993	Prison Heat	Saladin	
1993	American Cyborg: Steel Warrior	Leech Leader	
1993	The Mummy Lives	Tomb Guard	
1993	Deadly Heroes	Captain Abou	
1995	Holeh Ahava beShikun Gimmel	Eliahu	
2000	Delta Force One: The Lost Patrol	Abu Nim	
2001	Kikar HaHalomot	Aharon Gvardin	
2004	Avanim	Meir	
2004	The Syrian Bride	Simon	
2005	What a Wonderful Place	Franco	Original title: Eize Makom Nifla
2007	The Band's Visit	Avrum	Original title: Bikur Ha-Tizmoret
2007	The Kingdom	Izz Al-Din	
2007–2013	The Arbitrator	Yigal Ha-Natzi	
2008	House of Saddam	Ali Hassan Al-Majid	HBO mini-series
2009	Noah's Ark	Eliahu	Teivat Noach
2010	71 Square Meters	Siman Tov	
2010	Asfur	Reuven Amoyal	
2011	Little Simico's Great Fantasy	Jackie	
2012	The Dark Knight Rises	Blind Prisoner	
2012	Byzantium	Savella	
2013	Ana Arabia	Hassan	
2013–present	Beauty and the Baker	Avi Dahari	
2015	Fauda	Gideon Avital	
2016	One Week and a Day	Refael	
2018	Mary Magdalene	Philip	
2019	The Spy	Majid Sheikh Al-Ard	Netflix mini-series
2023	The Cops	Oved Sharabi	TV series. Original title: Ha-Shotrim
