= Intimate Grammar =

2010 film

- Theatrical release poster
- Hebrew: הדקדוק הפנימי
- Directed by: Nir Bergman
- Starring: Roee Elsberg; Orly Silbersatz
- Release date: 13 July 2010 (JFF)
- Running time: 110 minutes
- Country: Israel
- Language: Hebrew

Intimate Grammar (Hebrew: הדקדוק הפנימי) is a 2010 Israeli drama film directed by Nir Bergman and released in 2010. The screenplay was written by Bergman based on the novel The Book of Intimate Grammar by David Grossman. It was awarded the Grand Prix at the 2010 Tokyo International Film Festival. The film deals with the life of a Jerusalem family in the 1960s. The protagonist of the film is Aharon, a sensitive boy who "refuses to grow up". The film focuses on Aharon's relationship with his family and friends, with an emphasis on the triangular friendship between him, his friend Gideon, and his lover Yaeli.

== Synopsis ==
The film's plot focuses on Aaron Kleinfeld (Roee Elsberg), a Jerusalemite boy with developmental problems. Aaron mother (Orly Silbersatz-Banai) is a Holocaust survivor and his father (Yehuda Almagor) was a partisan, which creates great meaning of the Holocaust within the family.

Aharon is a very lonely boy, who fights a lot with the teenagers around him. Aharon's best friend is Gideon (Eden Luttenberg). Unlike Aharon, Gideon has developed normally. During the film, Aharon falls in love with Yael (Roni Tal), a girl his age, but at the end of the film it is implied that she has developed a relationship with Gideon.

There are also conflicts within Aaron's family that are expressed in the film: the first of which deals with Moshe's elderly and senile mother and Aaron's grandmother, who lives in the Kleinfeld family home. Hinda, Aaron's mother, has difficulty caring for the senile old woman, and therefore sends her to a nursing home, which causes harm to Aaron and his sister, who are emotionally attached to their grandmother.

The second conflict related to the Kleinfeld family is the affair between Moshe, Aaron's father, and Edna Blum, the family's mysterious neighbor. Edna Blum hired Moshe's services to help her with her home renovations, and it is explicitly stated throughout the film that they are having an affair, much to the displeasure of Hinda, who tries to keep them apart. Their separation ultimately leads to Edna's departure at the end of the film without explanation.

== Cast ==
- Roee Elsberg as Aaron Kleinfeld
- Orly Silbersatz as Hinda Kleinfeld
- Yehuda Almagor as Moshe
