= Pick a Card =

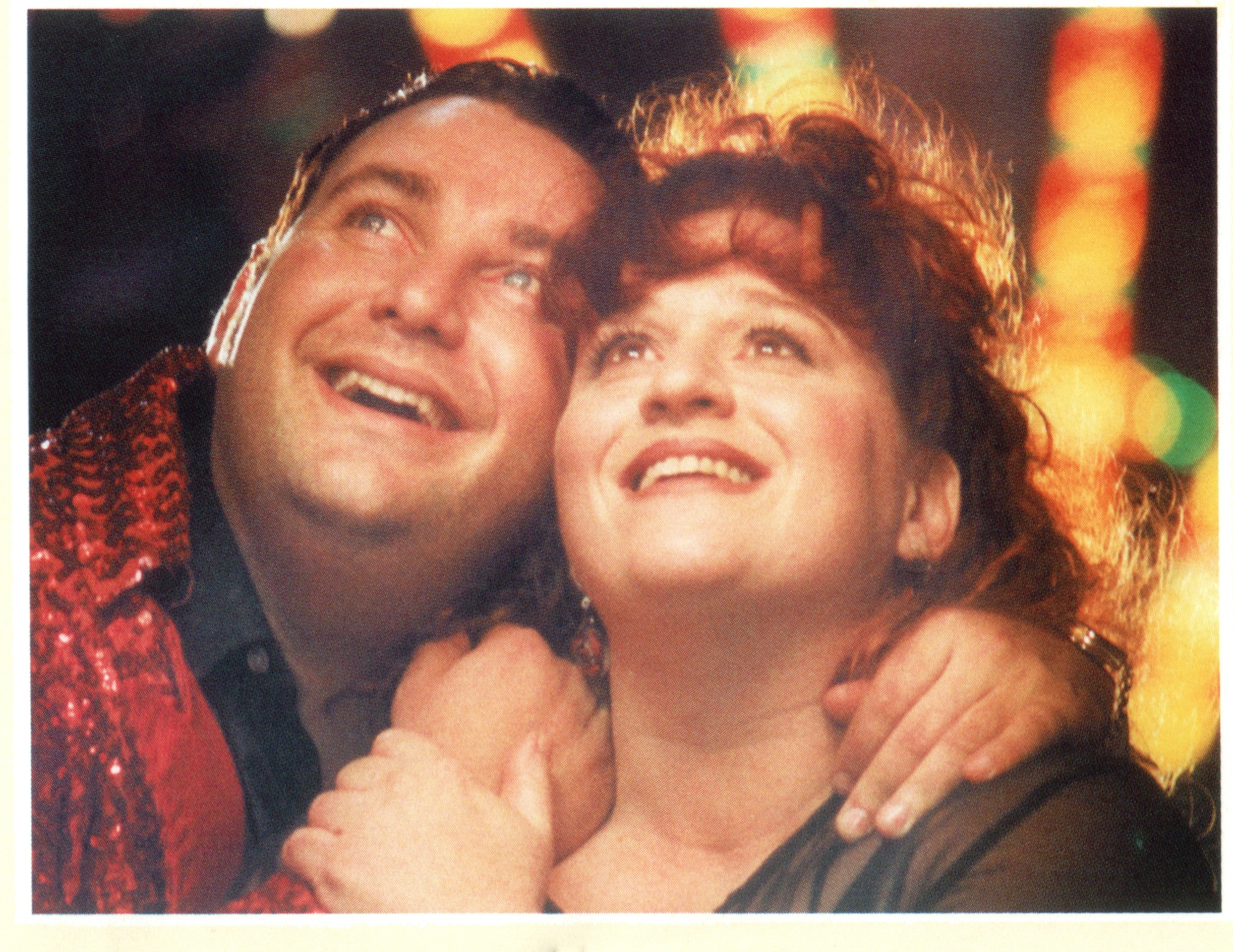
- Film poster
- עפולה אקספרס
- Directed by: Julie Shles
- Written by: Amit Lior, Julie Shles
- Produced by: Assaf Amir
- Cinematography: Yitzhak Portal
- Edited by: Maor Kishet
- Music by: Yuval Shafrir
- Production company: Norma Productions
- Release date: 1997
- Running time: 95 minutes
- Country: Israel
- Languages: Hebrew, English

Pick a Card, also known as Afula Express (Hebrew: עפולה אקספרס), is a 1997 Israeli romantic comedy drama film directed by Julie Shles. It stars Zvika Hadar, Esti Zakheim, and Aryeh Moskona. Critically acclaimed, it won the Ophir Award for Best Film. The film was selected as the Israeli entry for the Best Foreign Language Film at the 70th Academy Awards, but was not accepted as a nominee.

The movie focuses on aspiring magician David, whose girlfriend Batya wants him to concentrate more on their relationship. David joins up with Romanian immigrant Shimon, hoping that the two of them can form a magic act.

== Plot summary ==
David (Zvika Hadar) and Batya (Esti Zakheim), a couple from Afula, move to Tel Aviv in order to fulfill David's childhood dream of becoming a magician (now he works as a car electrician). The dream pursuit is interrupted, Batya starts supporting the two of them as a cashier in a supermarket and David accompanies his friend, Shimon (Aryeh Moskona), a former magician, but fails at every opportunity given to him. Nevertheless, David refuses to give up, and refuses to admit that he is not talented in magic, and because of this Batya gives him an ultimatum and moves in with a girl named Vicki (Orly Perl), a budding singer.

The plot takes a turn when David and Shimon begin to gain popularity in a successful magic show under the names "Haziz and Raam", and the relationship between David and Batya takes a new direction.

== See also ==
- List of submissions to the 70th Academy Awards for Best Foreign Language Film
- List of Israeli submissions for the Academy Award for Best Foreign Language Film
