= List of Jewish actors =

This is a list of notable Jewish actors. Some of these may have had some Jewish ancestry, and are ethnically considered Jewish, but did not practice Judaism (e.g. Douglas Fairbanks).

== Born in the 1990s–2000s ==
Name	Years	Nationality	Notable Roles	References
Austin Abrams	1996–	American	The Walking Dead, Paper Towns, Euphoria, Scary Stories to Tell in the Dark	
Gideon Adlon	1997–	American	Blockers, The Walking Dead: The Final Season, The Mustang, The Craft: Legacy, Sick	
Asher Angel	2002–	American	Andi Mack, Shazam!	
Iris Apatow	2002–	American	This Is 40, Love	
Maude Apatow	1997–	American	This Is 40, Other People, Assassination Nation, Euphoria	
Baby Ariel	2000–	American	Zombies	
Chiara Aurelia	2002–	American	Gerald's Game, Fear Street Part Two: 1978, Cruel Summer	
Odessa A'zion	2000–	American	Grand Army, Hellraiser, Until Dawn, Marty Supreme	
Ariela Barer	1998–	American	One Day at a Time, Runaways, How to Blow Up a Pipeline, The Last of Us	
Madison Beer	1999–	American	Louder Than Words	
Sofia Black-D'Elia	1991–	American	Skins, Single Drunk Female	
Asher Blinkoff	2008–	American	Hotel Transylvania 2, Hotel Transylvania 3	
Jonah Bobo	1997–	American	Zathura	
Billie Boullet	2005–	British-French	The Worst Witch, A Small Light	
Cameron Boyce	1999–2019	American	Jessie, Gamer's Guide to Pretty Much Everything, Descendants	
Abigail Breslin	1996–	American	Signs, Little Miss Sunshine, Zombieland, Zombieland: Double Tap, Stillwater	
Spencer Breslin	1992–	American	The Happening	
Ashley Brooke	2005–	American	Troop Zero, A Small Light	
Max Burkholder	1997–	American	Parenthood	
Carly Chaikin	1990–	American	Suburgatory, Mr. Robot	
Pauline Chalamet	1992–	American	The King of Staten Island, The Sex Lives of College Girls, Between the Temples	
Timothée Chalamet	1995–	American	Call Me by Your Name, Lady Bird, Little Women, Dune, Marty Supreme	
Emory Cohen	1990–	American	The Place Beyond the Pines, Brooklyn, The OA, Rebel Ridge	
David Corenswet	1993–	American	The Politician, We Own This City, Pearl, Twisters, Superman	
Caylee Cowan	1998–	American	Willy's Wonderland, Frank and Penelope	
Flora Cross	1993–	American	Bee Season	
Spencer Daniels	1992–	American		
Pete Davidson	1993–	American	Saturday Night Live, The King of Staten Island, Bodies Bodies Bodies	
Zoey Deutch	1994–	American	Vampire Academy, Everybody Wants Some!!, Before I Fall, Not Okay	
Jason Drucker	2005–	American	Bumblebee	
Hannah Einbinder	1995–	American	Hacks	
Ansel Elgort	1994–	American	The Fault in Our Stars, Baby Driver	
Beanie Feldstein	1993–	American	Neighbors 2: Sorority Rising, Lady Bird, Booksmart	
Noa Fisher	2000–	American	Uncut Gems, Betty, Master, Goodrich	
Brandon Flynn	1993–	American	13 Reasons Why, Ratched, Hellraiser	
Fabien Frankel	1994–	British	House of the Dragon	
Isabelle Fuhrman	1997–	American	Orphan, The Hunger Games, The Novice	
Aidan Gallagher	2003–	American	Nicky, Ricky, Dicky & Dawn, The Umbrella Academy	
Julia Garner	1994–	American	Electrick Children, We Are What We Are, Grandma, Ozark	
Dylan Gelula	1994–	American	Unbreakable Kimmy Schmidt, First Girl I Loved, Support the Girls, Shithouse, Smile 2	
Kaia Gerber	2001–	American	American Horror Stories, American Horror Story: Double Feature, Bottoms	
Esti Ginzburg	1990–	Israeli	Twelve	
Skyler Gisondo	1996–	American	Santa Clarita Diet, Vacation, The Righteous Gemstones, Booksmart, Licorice Pizza, Superman	
Ariella Glaser	2005–	British	Radioactive, White Bird	
Molly Gordon	1995–	American	Animal Kingdom, Booksmart, Good Boys, Shiva Baby, The Bear	
Zachary Gordon	1998–	American	Diary of a Wimpy Kid	
Alexander Gould	1994–	American	Finding Nemo, Weeds	
Jack Dylan Grazer	2003–	American	It, Shazam!	
Ariana Greenblatt	2007–	American	Avengers: Infinity War, Love and Monsters, Barbie	
Shira Haas	1995–	Israeli	Shtisel, Princess, Foxtrot, Unorthodox, Captain America: Brave New World	
Teo Halm	1999–	American	Earth to Echo	
Jonah Hauer-King	1995–	British	A Dog's Way Home, The Little Mermaid, The Tattooist of Auschwitz	
Fred Hechinger	1999–	American	News of the World, The Fear Street Trilogy, The White Lotus, Hell of a Summer, Gladiator II, Nickel Boys	
Madison Iseman	1997–	American	Tales of Halloween, Jumanji: Welcome to the Jungle	
Carter Jenkins	1991–	American	After	
Rachel Keller	1992–	American	Legion, Fargo, The Society	
Hunter King	1993–	American	A Girl Like Her	
Joey King	1999–	American	The Conjuring, Fargo, The Kissing Booth, The Act, We Were the Lucky Ones	
Kira Kosarin	1997–	American	The Thundermans	
Logan Lerman	1992–	American	Percy Jackson & the Olympians, The Perks of Being a Wallflower, Noah, Fury, Hunters, We Were the Lucky Ones	
Julia Lester	2000–	American	High School Musical: The Musical: The Series	
Chloe Levine	1996–	American	The Transfiguration, The OA, Ask for Jane	
Judah Lewis	2001–	American	Demolition, The Babysitter, The Christmas Chronicles	
Jaren Lewison	2000–	American	Never Have I Ever	
Jonathan Lipnicki	1990–	American	Jerry Maguire, Stuart Little, Like Mike	
Billie Lourd	1992–	American	American Horror Story, Booksmart, Star Wars: The Rise of Skywalker	
Mikey Madison	1999–	American	Better Things, Once Upon a Time in Hollywood, Scream, Anora, Lady in the Lake	
Milo Manheim	2001–	American	Zombies	
David Mazouz	2001–	American	Gotham, Touch	
Clara McGregor	1996–	British	American Horror Story: NYC, Bleeding Love	
Esther McGregor	2001–	British	Babygirl, The Room Next Door, High School, We Were Liars	
Blake Michael	1996–	American	Lemonade Mouth, Dog with a Blog	
Ezra Miller	1992–	American	City Island, Beware the Gonzo, We Need to Talk About Kevin, Perks of Being a Wallflower, Justice League	
Ian Nelson	1995–	American		
Wyatt Oleff	2003–	American	It, Guardians of the Galaxy	
Yasmin Paige	1990s–	British	Pramface, The Sarah Jane Adventures, Submarine	
Victoria Pedretti	1995–	American	The Haunting, You, Shirley	
Nicola Peltz	1995–	American	Bates Motel, Transformers: Dark of the Moon	
Ben Platt	1993–	American	Pitch Perfect, Dear Evan Hansen	
Ryan Potter	1995–	American	Supah Ninjas, Big Hero 6	
Bel Powley	1992–	British	The Diary of a Teenage Girl, White Boy Rick, The King of Staten Island, Moominvalley, A Small Light, Masters of the Air	
Emily Ratajkowski	1991–	American	Gone Girl	
Nathalia Ramos	1992–	Spanish	House of Anubis	
Sarah Ramos	1991–	American	American Dreams, Parenthood	
Anna Rezan	1992–	Greek		
Ben Rosenfield	1992–	American	Boardwalk Empire, 6 Years, Twin Peaks	
Sofia Rosinsky	2006–	American	Paper Girls, Death and Other Details	
Ella Rubin	2001–	American	The Chair, The Idea of You, Masters of the Air, Until Dawn, Fear Street: Prom Queen	
Joshua Rush	2001–	American	Andi Mack	
Odeya Rush	1997–	Israeli-American	The Giver, Goosebumps, Lady Bird, Dumplin', Let It Snow, Cha Cha Real Smooth	
Daryl Sabara	1992–	American	Spy Kids series, Generator Rex, Ben 10	
Halston Sage	1993–	American	How to Rock, Neighbors, Paper Towns	
Sadie Sandler	2006–	American	Hubie Halloween, You Are So Not Invited to My Bat Mitzvah, Leo	
Sunny Sandler	2008–	American	Hubie Halloween, You Are So Not Invited to My Bat Mitzvah, Leo	
Larry Saperstein	1998–	American	High School Musical: The Musical: The Series	
Noah Schnapp	2004–	American	Stranger Things	
Max Schneider	1992–	American	How to Rock	
Julian Shapiro-Barnum	1999–	American	Recess Therapy	
Sarah Sherman	1993–	American	Nimona, You Are So Not Invited to My Bat Mitzvah	
Diana Silvers	1997–	American	Into the Dark, Booksmart, Ma, Space Force, Birds of Paradise	
Troye Sivan	1995–	Australian	Spud	
Sasha Spielberg	1990–	American	In a Relationship	
Ari'el Stachel	1991–	American	Zola, Don't Worry Darling	
Adiel Stein	1991–	American	Stolen Summer	
Hanna Stein	1991–	American	Never Have I Ever	
Hailee Steinfeld	1996–	American	True Grit, The Edge of Seventeen, Spider-Man: Into the Spider-Verse, Bumblebee	
Gregg Sulkin	1992–	British	Avalon High, Faking It, Wizards of Waverly Place, Runaways	
Aaron Taylor-Johnson	1990–	British	Nowhere Boy, Kick-Ass, Avengers: Age of Ultron, Nocturnal Animals, Outlaw King, Nosferatu, 28 Years Later	
Bex Taylor-Klaus	1994–	American	The Killing, House of Lies, Arrow, Scream	
Yali Topol Margalith	2000–	Israeli	The Tattooist of Auschwitz, A Good Girl's Guide to Murder	
Madeline Weinstein	1993–	American	Beach Rats, Alex Strangelove, Mare of Easttown, Between the Temples	
Zoe Weizenbaum	1991–	American	Memoirs of a Geisha	
Alex Wolff	1997–	American	The Naked Brothers Band, Patriots Day, Jumanji: Welcome to the Jungle, Hereditary	
Nat Wolff	1994–	American	The Naked Brothers Band, The Fault in Our Stars, Paper Towns	
Sarah Yarkin	1993–	American	Happy Death Day 2U, Motherland: Fort Salem, Texas Chainsaw Massacre, Not Okay	
Hadas Yaron	1990–	Israeli	Fill the Void, Felix and Meira, Shtisel, We Were the Lucky Ones	
Lucas Jade Zumann	2000–	American	20th Century Women, Anne with an E	

== Born in the 1980s ==
Name	Years	Nationality	Notable roles	References
Dianna Agron	1986–	American	Heroes, Glee, I Am Number Four, Shiva Baby	
Jonathan Ahdout	1989–	American	House of Sand and Fog	
Cooper Andrews	1985–	American	Shazam!, The Walking Dead	
Aviv Alush	1982–	Israeli	False Flag, The Women's Balcony, The Shack	
Nora Arnezeder	1989–	French		
Skylar Astin	1987–	American	Pitch Perfect, Spring Awakening	
Moran Atias	1981–	Israeli	The Resident	
Justin Berfield	1986–	American	Malcolm in the Middle	
Rachel Bilson	1981–	American	The O.C., The Last Kiss, Hart of Dixie	
Rachel Bloom	1987–	American	Crazy Ex-Girlfriend	
Josh Bowman	1988–	British	Revenge	
Alison Brie	1982–	American	Community, Mad Men, GLOW	
Ania Bukstein	1982–	Russian-born Israeli	False Flag, Game of Thrones	
Amanda Bynes	1986–	American	She's the Man, Hairspray, The Amanda Show	
Aya Cash	1982–	American	The Boys, You're the Worst	
Lizzy Caplan	1982–	American	Mean Girls, Cloverfield, Party Down, True Blood	
Cristiana Capotondi	1980–	Italian		
Lauren Cohan	1982–	British-American	The Walking Dead	
Matt Cohen	1982–	American	South of Nowhere	
Lauren Collins	1986–	Canadian	Degrassi: The Next Generation	
Alexa Davalos	1982–	American		
Dave Davis	1989–	American	The Vigil	
Kat Dennings	1986–	American	Nick and Norah's Infinite Playlist, 2 Broke Girls, Thor	
Daveed Diggs	1982–	American	Hamilton, clipping.	
Drake	1986–	Canadian	Degrassi: The Next Generation	
Lena Dunham	1986–	American	Girls	
Zac Efron	1987–	American	High School Musical, 17 Again, Neighbors	
Alden Ehrenreich	1989–	American	Hail, Caesar!, Solo: A Star Wars Story	
Jesse Eisenberg	1983–	American	The Social Network, Now You See Me, Batman v Superman: Dawn of Justice	
Jake Epstein	1987–	Canadian	Degrassi: The Next Generation	
Stacey Farber	1987–	Canadian	Degrassi: The Next Generation	
Ben Feldman	1980–	American	The Perfect Man, Mad Men, Superstore	
Donna Feldman	1982–	American	You Don't Mess with the Zohan	
Jeremy Ferdman	1986–	Canadian		
Ben Foster	1980–	American	X-Men: The Last Stand	
Jon Foster	1984–	American	Stay Alive	
Shayna Fox	1984–	American		
Dave Franco	1985–	American	Superbad, Now You See Me, Scrubs	
Jason Fuchs	1986–	American	Holy Rollers	
Seth Gabel	1981–	American		
Josh Gad	1981–	American	The Rocker, 21, Love & Other Drugs, Frozen, Frozen II	
Gal Gadot	1985–	Israeli	Fast & Furious, Batman v Superman: Dawn of Justice	
Andrew Garfield	1983–	American-born British	Lions for Lambs, The Social Network, The Amazing Spider-Man, Tick, Tick... Boom!	
Romola Garai	1982–	Hong Kong-born British		
Rafi Gavron	1989–	British-American	Inkheart	
Gideon Glick	1988–	American	Spring Awakening	
Ilana Glazer	1987–	American	Broad City, The Night Before	
Jake Goldsbie	1988–	Canadian		
Brett Goldstein	1980–	British	Ted Lasso	
Joseph Gordon-Levitt	1981–	American	10 Things I Hate About You, Inception, Looper, (500) Days of Summer, The Dark Knight Rises, Premium Rush	
Katerina Graham	1989–	Swiss-born American	The Vampire Diaries	
Ari Graynor	1983–	American	Holy Rollers, Nick and Norah's Infinite Playlist, Whip It	
Eva Green	1980–	French	The Dreamers, Casino Royale	
Yael Grobglas	1984–	French-born Israeli	Reign, Jane the Virgin, JeruZalem	
Jake Gyllenhaal	1980–	American	Donnie Darko, Brokeback Mountain, The Day After Tomorrow	
Erin Heatherton	1989–	American		
Simon Helberg	1980–	American	The Big Bang Theory, A Serious Man	
Jonah Hill	1983–	American	Superbad, Moneyball, 21 Jump Street, The Wolf of Wall Street	
Aaron Himelstein	1986–	American	Austin Powers in Goldmember	
Michiel Huisman	1981–	Dutch	Game of Thrones, The Haunting of Hill House, The Age of Adaline	
Oliver Jackson-Cohen	1986–	British	The Haunting of Hill House, The Haunting of Bly Manor, The Invisible Man	
Dana Ivgy	1982–	Israeli	Or (My Treasure), Jaffa, Zero Motivation	
Abbi Jacobson	1984–	American	Broad City, Neighbors 2: Sorority Rising	
Will Janowitz	1980–	American	The Sopranos	
Scarlett Johansson	1984–	American	Lost in Translation, Match Point, The Avengers, Her, Marriage Story, Jojo Rabbit	
Jeremy Jordan	1984–	American	Smash, The Last Five Years	
Tomer Kapon	1985–	Israeli	The Boys	
Eddie Kaye Thomas	1980–	American	American Pie, Scorpion, American Dad!, 'Til Death, How to Make It in America, Harold & Kumar	
Robert Kazinsky	1983–	British	EastEnders	
Jonathan Keltz	1988–	American	Entourage, Prom, 21 & Over	
Shane Kippel	1986–	Canadian	Degrassi: The Next Generation	
Mila Kunis	1983–	Ukrainian-born American	That '70s Show, Family Guy, Forgetting Sarah Marshall, Black Swan, Ted	
Shia LaBeouf	1986–	American	Transformers, Disturbia, The Greatest Game Ever Played, Eagle Eye, Indiana Jones and the Kingdom of the Crystal Skull	
Emma Lahana	1984–	New Zealand	Power Rangers Dino Thunder, Cloak & Dagger	
Melanie Laurent	1983–	French	Je vais bien, ne t'en fais pas, Inglourious Basterds	
Inbar Lavi	1986–	Israeli	Imposters, Prison Break, Lucifer	
Margarita Levieva	1980–	Russian	The Invisible, Revenge	
Jane Levy	1989–	American	Shameless, Evil Dead, Zoey's Extraordinary Playlist	
Sivan Levy	1987–	Israeli	Six Acts, Inch'Allah	
Alex D. Linz	1989–	American	Home Alone 3, Max Keeble's Big Move	
John Magaro	1983–	American	The Life Before Her Eyes, Assassination of a High School President	
Shiri Maimon	1981–	Israeli		
Zosia Mamet	1988–	American	Girls	
Eli Marienthal	1986–	American	Confessions of a Teenage Drama Queen, The Iron Giant	
Thomas McDonell	1986–	American	The 100	
Scott Mechlowicz	1981–	American	EuroTrip, Mean Creek	
Christopher Mintz-Plasse	1989–	American	Superbad, Role Models, Kick-Ass	
Julian Morris	1983–	British	Pretty Little Liars, ER, Cry Wolf	
Bar Paly	1985–	Russian-born Israeli-American		
Adam Pally	1982–	American	Happy Endings	
Sara Paxton	1988–	American	Darcy's Wild Life, Aquamarine	
Josh Peck	1986–	American	Drake & Josh, Max Keeble's Big Move	
Ashley Peldon	1984–	American		
Courtney Peldon	1981–	American		
Sarah Podemski	1983–	Canadian	Empire of Dirt, Reservation Dogs	
Alisan Porter	1981–	American	Curly Sue, The Voice	
Natalie Portman	1981–	Israeli-born American	Star Wars: Episodes I, II, III, V for Vendetta, Black Swan	
Laura Prepon	1980–	American	That '70s Show. Orange Is the New Black	
Ester Rada	1985–	Israeli		
Daniel Radcliffe	1989–	British	Harry Potter film series	
Ben Rappaport	1986–	American	Outsourced	
Melissa Rauch	1980–	American	The Big Bang Theory, The Bronze	
Monica Raymund	1986–	American		
Nikki Reed	1988–	American	Thirteen, Lords of Dogtown, The Twilight Saga	
Bar Refaeli	1985–	Israeli	Session	
Max Rhyser	1982–	American	A Four Letter Word, Homeland, Violet Tendencies	
Seth Rogen	1982–	Canadian	Pineapple Express, Knocked Up, Neighbors	
Agam Rodberg	1986–	Israel		
Emmy Rossum	1986–	American	The Phantom of the Opera, Poseidon, Shameless	
Jessica Rothe	1987–	American	Happy Death Day	
Daniela Ruah	1983–	Portuguese-American	NCIS: Los Angeles	
Lara Sacher	1986–	Australian	Neighbours	
Amy Schumer	1981–	American	Inside Amy Schumer, Trainwreck	
Ben Schwartz	1981–	American	Peep World, Undercovers, House of Lies, Sonic The Hedgehog	
Jason Schwartzman	1980–	American		
Robert Schwartzman	1982–	American	Princess Diaries	
Jason Segel	1980–	American	How I Met Your Mother, Forgetting Sarah Marshall	
David Serero	1981–	French		
Jamie-Lynn Sigler	1981–	American	The Sopranos, Entourage	
Nick Simmons	1989–	American		
Ed Skrein	1983–	British	Game of Thrones, The Transporter Refueled, Deadpool	
Jenny Slate	1982–	American	Saturday Night Live, Despicable Me 3	
Leelee Sobieski	1983–	American		
Marla Sokoloff	1980–	American	Big Day	
Emilia Spivak	1981–	Russian		
Shoshannah Stern	1980–	American	Jericho, The Hammer, Supernatural	
Yael Stone	1985–	Australian	Orange Is The New Black	
Lauren Storm	1987–	American	Flight 29 Down	
Jade Tailor	1985-	American	The Magicians	
Alona Tal	1983–	Israeli	Supernatural, Hostages, Daredevil	
Ninet Tayeb	1983–	Israeli		
Khleo Thomas	1989–	American	Holes	
Itay Tiran	1980–	Israeli	Beaufort, Lebanon, Hostages	
Ashley Tisdale	1985–	American	High School Musical, The Suite Life of Zack & Cody	
Michelle Trachtenberg	1985–2025	American	Buffy the Vampire Slayer, Gossip Girl, 17 Again	
Jonathan Tucker	1982–	American	The Texas Chainsaw Massacre, The Ruins	
Raviv (Ricky) Ullman	1986–	Israeli-born American	Phil of the Future	
Milana Vayntrub	1987–	Uzbek-American	AT&T television commercials, This Is Us	
Hannah Ware	1982–	English	Boss	
Michael Welch	1987–	American	Joan of Arcadia	
Mara Wilson	1987–	American	Matilda, Mrs. Doubtfire, Miracle on 34th Street	
Sophie Winkleman	1980–	British	Two and a Half Men	
James Wolk	1985–	American	Lone Star, Shameless	
Evan Rachel Wood	1987–	American	Thirteen, The Upside of Anger, Across the Universe, Westworld	
Alex Wyse	1987–	American	Spring Awakening, Lysistrata Jones, Wicked	
Anton Yelchin	1989–2016	Russian-born American	Alpha Dog, Terminator Salvation, Star Trek	
Ashley Zukerman	1983–	American	The Fear Street Trilogy	

== Born in the 1970s ==
Name	Years	Nationality	Prominent roles	References
Reymond Amsalem	1978–	Israeli	Hostages	
Dave Annable	1979–	American		
Shiri Appleby	1978–	American	Roswell	
David Arquette	1971–	American	Scream, See Spot Run	
Matt Austin	1975–	Canadian	Power Rangers S.P.D.	
Mili Avital	1972–	Israeli	Stargate	
Eric Balfour	1977–	American		
Elizabeth Banks	1974–	American	The Hunger Games, Spider-Man	
Sendi Bar	1976–	Israeli		
Sacha Baron Cohen	1971–	British	Ali G, Borat, Brüno, The Dictator	
Justin Bartha	1978–	American	Gigli, National Treasure, The Hangover	
Dani Behr	1971–	British		
Amber Benson	1977–	American	Buffy the Vampire Slayer	
Elizabeth Berkley	1972–	American	Saved by the Bell, Showgirls	
Josh Bernstein	1971–	American	Digging for the Truth	
Jon Bernthal	1976–	American	The Walking Dead, Night at the Museum: Battle of the Smithsonian, The Punisher	
Mayim Bialik	1975–	American	Blossom, The Big Bang Theory	
Michael Ian Black	1971–	American		
Selma Blair	1972–	American	Cruel Intentions, Hellboy	
Alex Borstein	1973–	American	Family Guy	
Caprice Bourret	1971–	American/British		
Zach Braff	1975–	American	Scrubs, Garden State, The Last Kiss	
Tamara Braun	1971–	American		
Adam Brody	1979–	American	The O.C.	
Adrien Brody	1973–	American	Septembers of Shiraz, The Pianist	
Sarah Brown	1975–	American		
Brooke Burke	1971–	American		
Scott Caan	1976–	American	Hawaii 5–0	
James Callis	1971–	British	Battlestar Galactica	
Neve Campbell	1973–	Canadian	Scream	
Josh Charles	1971–	American	The Good Wife, Sports Night, Dead Poets Society	
David Charvet	1972–	French-born American	Baywatch	
Dmitry Chepovetsky	1970–	Ukrainian	ReGenesis	
Emmanuelle Chriqui	1977–	Canadian	Entourage, You Don't Mess with the Zohan	
Assaf Cohen	1972–	American		
Jennifer Connelly	1970–	American		
Eric Dane	1972–	American	Grey's Anatomy, Marley & Me, Valentine's Day	
Erin Daniels	1973–	American	The L Word	
Dustin Diamond	1977–2021	American	Saved by the Bell	
Meital Dohan	1976–	Israeli	Weeds	
Vanja Ejdus	1976–	Serbian		
Gad Elmaleh	1971–	Moroccan-French		
Oded Fehr	1970–	Israeli/American	The Mummy, Resident Evil	
Corey Feldman	1971–	American	The Goonies	
Mark Feuerstein	1971–	American	Royal Pains	
Isla Fisher	1976–	Omani-born Australian	Wedding Crashers, Confessions of a Shopaholic, The Great Gatsby	
James Franco	1978–	American	James Dean, Spider-Man, 127 Hours	
Soleil Moon Frye	1976–	American	Punky Brewster	
Sarah Michelle Gellar	1977–	American	Buffy the Vampire Slayer	
Sara Gilbert	1975–	American	Roseanne	
Jessalyn Gilsig	1971–	Canadian	Nip/Tuck	
Elon Gold	1970–	American		
Iddo Goldberg	1975–	Israeli	Defiance	
Ginnifer Goodwin	1978–	American	Once Upon a Time	
Seth Green	1974–	American	Robot Chicken, Austin Powers, Family Guy	
Bryan Greenberg	1978–	American	Prime	
Max Greenfield	1979–	American	New Girl	
Becky Griffin	1977–	American-Israeli		
Maggie Gyllenhaal	1977–	American	The Dark Knight	
Tiffany Haddish	1979–	American-Eritrean	Girls Trip	
Corey Haim	1971–2010	Canadian	Lucas, The Lost Boys	
Tzachi Halevy	1975–	Israeli	Bethlehem, Fauda, Mary Magdalene	
Chelsea Handler	1975–	American	Chelsea Lately	
Alyson Hannigan	1974–	American		
Samantha Harris	1973–	American		
Cole Hauser	1975–	American		
Daniel Hendler	1976–	Uruguayan	Bottom of the Sea, Family Law	
Kate Hudson	1979–	American	Almost Famous, How to Lose a Guy in 10 Days	
Oliver Hudson	1976–	American		
Rashida Jones	1976–	American	The Office (U.S.), Parks and Recreation	
Chris Kattan	1970–	American		
Omri Katz	1976–	American	Dallas	
Joel Kinnaman	1979–	Swedish and American	Easy Money, RoboCop, Altered Carbon	
Mia Kirshner	1975–	Canadian	The L Word, 24	
Alla Korot	1970–	Ukrainian-born American		
Nick Kroll	1978–	American	The League, Big Mouth, Kroll Show, The House	
Lisa Kushell	1971–	American	MADtv, co-host of Dinner and a Movie	
David Krumholtz	1978–	American	NUMB3RS	
Juliet Landau	1972–	American		
Aaron Lazar	1976–	American	J. Edgar, The Notorious Bettie Page	
Yehezkel Lazarov	1974–	Israeli		
Adam Levine	1979–	American	The Voice	
Jonah Lotan	1973–	Israeli-American	Hostages	
Matt Lucas	1974–	British	The Infidel	
Michael Lucas	1972–	Russian-born		
Jamie Luner	1971–	American	Melrose Place	
Natasha Lyonne	1979–	American	American Pie, Orange is the New Black	
Gabriel Macht	1972–	American		
Idina Menzel	1971–	American	Wicked, Frozen	
Adir Miller	1974–	Israeli	Ramzor	
B. J. Novak	1979–	American	The Office, Inglourious Basterds	
Gwyneth Paltrow	1972–	American	Shakespeare in Love	
Pink	1979–	American		
Adam Pascal	1970–	American	Rent	
Amanda Peet	1972–	American		
Melanie Peres	1971–	Israeli		
Joaquin Phoenix	1974–	Puerto Rican-born American	Gladiator, Walk the Line, Joker	
Rain Phoenix	1973–	American		
River Phoenix	1970–1993	American	Stand by Me	
Summer Phoenix	1978–	American		
Eyal Podell	1975–	Israeli-American		
Jennifer Podemski	1973–	Canadian	Empire of Dirt, Reservation Dogs	
Tamara Podemski	1977–	Canadian	Outer Range, Reservation Dogs	
Josh Radnor	1974–	American	How I Met Your Mother	
Michael Rapaport	1970–	American	Boston Public, Atypical	
Lior Raz	1971–	Israeli	Fauda	
Leah Remini	1970–	American	The King of Queens	
Simon Rex	1974–	American	What I Like About You, National Lampoon's Pledge This, Red Rocket	
Sasha Roiz	1973–	Israeli-born Canadian	Grimm	
Michael Rosenbaum	1972–	American	Smallville	
Tracee Ellis Ross	1972–	American	Black-ish	
Eli Roth	1972–	American		
Maya Rudolph	1972–	American	Saturday Night Live	
Winona Ryder	1971–	American	Heathers, Edward Scissorhands, Stranger Things, Beetlejuice, Mermaids, A Scanner Darkly	
Antonio Sabàto Jr	1972–	Italian-American		
John Safran	1972–	Australian		
Sarah Saltzberg	1976–	American		
Andy Samberg	1978–	American	Saturday Night Live	
Fred Savage	1976–	American	The Wonder Years, The Princess Bride	
Yuval Segal	1971–	Israeli	Fauda	
Michael Showalter	1970–	American		
Maggie Siff	1974–	American	Mad Men, Sons of Anarchy, Push	
Sarah Silverman	1970–	American	The Sarah Silverman Program	
Alicia Silverstone	1976–	American	Clueless, Batman and Robin	
Estelle Skornik	1971–	French	Papa and Nicole	
Ione Skye	1971–	British-born American	Say Anything...	
Troy Slaten	1975–	American	Parker Lewis Can't Lose, Cagney & Lacey	
Lindsay Sloane	1977–	American		
Bahar Soomekh	1975–	Iranian-born American	Crash, Saw	
Tori Spelling	1973–	American	Beverly Hills 90210	
Jordana Spiro	1977–	American	My Boys	
Rachel Stevens	1978–	British	S Club 7	
Corey Stoll	1976–	American	North Country, Lucky Number Slevin, House of Cards	
Matt Stone	1971–	American	South Park	
Danny Strong	1974–	American		
Tara Strong	1973–	Canadian	Drawn Together, Ben 10, The Fairly Oddparents, Hamtaro, The Powerpuff Girls, My Little Pony	
Kevin Sussman	1970–	American	Ugly Betty, Burn After Reading	
Noa Tishby	1975–	Israeli	The Island	
Mageina Tovah	1979–	American		
Hilla Vidor	1975–	Israeli	Hostages	
Taika Waititi	1975–	New Zealander		
Scott Weinger	1975–	American	Full House, Aladdin	
Kevin Weisman	1970–	American		
Rachel Weisz	1971–	British		
Jennifer Westfeldt	1970–	American	Kissing Jessica Stein	
Marissa Jaret Winokur	1973–	American	Hairspray (stage version)	
Noah Wyle	1971–	American	ER, Falling Skies	
Michal Yannai	1972–	Israeli-American	Avenue Q	
Michael Zegen	1979–	American	Rescue Me, Boardwalk Empire	
Nikki Ziering	1971–	American		
Naor Zion	1973–	Israeli	Naor's Friends	

== Born in the 1960s ==
Name	Years	Nationality	Prominent roles	Jewish lineage	References
Paula Abdul	1962–	American	American Idol		
Paul Adelstein	1969–	American	Prison Break, Private Practice		
Ronni Ancona	1968–	British (Scottish)			
Mathieu Amalric	1965–	French	Munich, Quantum of Solace, The Grand Budapest Hotel, The French Dispatch		
Patricia Arquette	1968–	American	True Romance, Boyhood	Mother	
Lior Ashkenazi	1969–	Israeli	Late Marriage, Footnote, Big Bad Wolves, Foxtrot, 7 Days in Entebbe		
Yvan Attal	1965–	Israeli-French	Munich, Rush Hour 3		
Hank Azaria	1964–	American	The Simpsons, Uprising		
David Baddiel	1964–	British			
David Alan Basche	1968–	American			
Randall Batinkoff	1968–	American	For Keeps?		
H. Jon Benjamin	1966–	American	Archer, Bob's Burgers		
Abraham Benrubi	1969–	American	ER		
Bob Bergen	1964–	American	Jep!, Looney Tunes: Back in Action, Space Jam		
Mary Kay Bergman	1961–1999	American	South Park		
Troy Beyer	1964–	American			
Craig Bierko	1964–	American	Cinderella Man		
Jack Black	1969–	American	School of Rock, Kung Fu Panda, A Minecraft Movie	Mother	
Maddie Blaustein	1960–2008	American	Pokémon		
Yasmine Bleeth	1968–	American	Baywatch		
Kim Bodnia	1965–	Danish	Pusher, The Bridge, Killing Eve		
Lisa Bonet	1967–	American	Angel Heart, The Cosby Show	Father	
Helena Bonham Carter	1966–	British	Alice in Wonderland, Harry Potter film series, Sweeney Todd: The Demon Barber of Fleet Street		
Bussunda	1962–2006	Brazilian	Casseta & Planeta		
Gabrielle Carteris	1961–	American	Beverly Hills 90210		
Louis C.K.	1967–	American			
Scott Cohen	1964–	American	The 10th Kingdom, Gilmore Girls, Perfect Murder, Perfect Town		
Mindy Cohn	1966–	American	The Facts of Life, Scooby-Doo		
David Cross	1964–	American	Arrested Development		
Dean Devlin	1962–	American			
Don Diamont	1961–	American	The Young and the Restless		
Robert Downey Jr.	1965–	American	Pound, Weird Science, Less than Zero, Chaplin, The Singing Detective, Kiss Kiss Bang Bang, Iron Man, Tropic Thunder, Gothika	Father	
Julia Louis-Dreyfus	1961–	American	Seinfeld, Veep	Father	
David Duchovny	1960–	American	The X-Files, Kalifornia, Californication	Father	
Lisa Edelstein	1966–	American	House		
Ronit Elkabetz	1964–2016	Israeli			
Jon Favreau	1966–	American	Chef, Iron Man, Spider-Man: Homecoming	Mother	
Vanessa Feltz	1962–	British			
Dan Futterman	1967–	American			
Jeff Garlin	1962–	American	Curb Your Enthusiasm, The Goldebergs		
Brad Garrett	1960–	American	Everybody Loves Raymond		
Gina Gershon	1962–	American	Showgirls		
Jami Gertz	1965–	American	Quicksilver, Twister		
Melissa Gilbert	1964–	American	Little House on the Prairie		
Judy Gold	1962–	American			
Bill Goldberg	1966–	American	WCW		
Jennifer Grey	1960–	American	Dirty Dancing, Ferris Bueller's Day Off		
Arye Gross	1960–	American			
Annabelle Gurwitch	1961–	American	Hostess of TBS's Dinner and a Movie		
Evan Handler	1961–	American	Sex and the City, Californication		
Jessica Hecht	1965–	American			
Monica Horan	1963–	American	Everybody Loves Raymond		
Helen Hunt	1963–	American	Mad About You, What Women Want	Paternal Grandmother	
Jason Isaacs	1963–	British	Harry Potter, The Patriot, Brotherhood, Star Trek: Discovery		
Peter Jacobson	1965–	American	House		
Lesli Kay	1965–	American	The Bold and the Beautiful		
Paul Kaye	1964–	British			
Heather Paige Kent	1969–	American			
Marc Kudisch	1966–	American			
Lisa Kudrow	1963–	American	Friends		
John Lehr	1967–	American	10 Items or Less	Converted to Judaism	
Jennifer Jason Leigh	1962–	American	Fast Times at Ridgemont High, Last Exit to Brooklyn, Single White Female, The Hateful Eight		
Paul Lieberstein	1967–	American			
Joshua Malina	1966–	American			
Camryn Manheim	1961–	American	The Practice		
Cindy Margolis	1965–	American			
Julianna Margulies	1966–	American	ER		
Marc Maron	1963–	American	GLOW, Joker		
Brett Marx	1964–	American	The Bad News Bears		
Marlee Matlin	1965–	American	Children of a Lesser God		
Mathilda May	1965–	French	Lifeforce		
Debra Messing	1968–	American	Will & Grace		
Dina Meyer	1968–	American	Saw films		
Ari Meyers	1969–	American	Kate & Allie		
Sasha Mitchell	1967–	American	Step by Step		
Maia Morgenstern	1962–	Romanian	The Passion of the Christ		
Rob Morrow	1962–	American	Northern Exposure, Numb3rs		
Erin Murphy	1964–	American			
Andy Nyman	1966–	British	Dead Set, Death at a Funeral, Ghost Stories		
Sophie Okonedo	1969–	British	Hotel Rwanda		
Sarah Jessica Parker	1965–	American	Sex and the City, New Year's Eve, Footloose		
Sean Penn	1960–	American	Fast Times at Ridgemont High, Milk, Mystic River, Carlito's Way, Dead Man Walking, I Am Sam		
Tracy Pollan	1960–	American	Family Ties		
Jeremy Piven	1965–	American	Entourage		
Rain Pryor	1969–	American		Mother	
Ted Raimi	1965–	American			
Adam Rich	1968–2023	American	Eight is Enough		
Kyle Richards	1969–	American	Halloween films	Converted to Judaism	
Paul Rothbart	1961-	American comedian, writer, director, actor	Isn't It Romantic?		
Paul Rudd	1969–	American	Ant-Man, The 40-Year-Old Virgin, Knocked Up, This is 40, Mute, Ideal Home		
Adam Sandler	1966–	American	Billy Madison, Click, Grown Ups, Happy Gilmore, You Don't Mess with the Zohan		
Rebecca Schaeffer	1967–1989	American	My Sister Sam		
Rob Schneider	1963–	American	Deuce Bigalow: Male Gigolo, The Animal, The Hot Chick, The Benchwarmers	Father	
Bitty Schram	1968–	American	A League of Their Own, Monk		
Liev Schreiber	1967–	American	Ray Donovan		
Scott Schwartz	1968–	American	A Christmas Story, The Toy		
David Schwimmer	1966–	American	Friends, Madagascar		
Sam Seder	1966–	American			
Kyra Sedgwick	1965–	American	Born on the Fourth of July, The Closer		
Ally Sheedy	1962–	American	The Breakfast Club, St. Elmo's Fire		
Ben Shenkman	1968–	American	Angels in America, Then She Found Me		
Pauly Shore	1968–	American	Encino Man, Son in Law, Bio-Dome		
Jonathan Silverman	1966–	American			
Laura Silverman	1966–	American	The Sarah Silverman Program, The Comeback		
Meskie Shibru-Sivan	1967–	Ethiopian-born Israeli			
Helen Slater	1963–	American	Supergirl		
Georgia Slowe	1966–	British	Emmerdale		
Rena Sofer	1968–	American			
Israel Sonnenschein	1962–	German	Finale		
Jon Stewart	1962–	American	The Daily Show		
Ben Stiller	1965–	American	Keeping the Faith, Zoolander, Tower Heist, The Secret Life of Walter Mitty, Night at the Museum, Meet the Parents, Black and White, Madagascar		
Michael Stuhlbarg	1968–	American	A Serious Man, Boardwalk Empire		
Matilda Thorpe	1960–	British	Desmond's, Porkpie, Sick Note	Mother (Gillian Freeman)	
Rachel True	1966–	American	CB4, Half Baked		
Michael Vartan	1968–	French-American actor	Alias		
Jean-Claude Van Damme	1960–	Belgian	Universal Soldier	Paternal Grandmother	
Alex Winter	1965–	British-born American actor	Bill & Ted films, The Lost Boys		
Maggie Wheeler	1961–	American actor	Ellen, Friends		
Scott Wolf	1968–	American	Party of Five		
Ian Ziering	1964–	American	Beverly Hills 90210, Sharknado		
Ayelet Zurer	1969–	Israeli	Ben Hur, Munich, Vantage Point, Man of Steel		

== Born in the 1950s ==
Name	Years	Nationality/profession	Prominent roles	Jewish lineage	References
Caroline Aaron	1952–	American actress and producer	Wings		
Jason Alexander	1959–	American actor	Seinfeld		
Adam Arkin	1956–	American television, film, and stage actor	Chicago Hope		
Tom Arnold	1959–	American actor and comedian		Converted to Judaism	
Rosanna Arquette	1959–	American actress, film director, and film producer			
Ellen Barkin	1954–	American actress			
Roseanne Barr	1952–	American actress, writer, talk-show host and comedian	Roseanne		
Steven Bauer	1956–	Cuban-born American actor	Ray Donovan, Scarface		
Robby Benson	1956–	American actor, former teen idol	Beauty and the Beast		
Sandra Bernhard	1955–	American actress and comedian			
Mark Blum	1950–2020	American actor	Desperately Seeking Susan, Crocodile Dundee		
Leslie Hoffman	1955–	American stuntwoman and actress	Nightmare on Elm Street, Star Trek: Deep Space Nine, Star Trek: Voyager, First Stuntwoman elected to the SAG board of directors		
Mike Binder	1958–	American screenwriter, film director and actor			
Kate Capshaw	1953–	American actress	Indiana Jones and the Temple of Doom	Converted to Judaism	
Allan Corduner	1950–	British television, film, and stage actor	Topsy Turvy, Defiance		
Katie Couric	1957–	American media personality	Shark Tale	Jewish mother	
Jamie Lee Curtis	1958–	American film actress, successful writer	Halloween		
Daniel Day-Lewis	1957–	British-born Academy Award–winning actor	Lincoln	Mother (Jill Balcon)	
Ted Levine	1957–	American actor	The Silence of the Lambs		
Fran Drescher	1957–	American film and television actress	The Nanny, Saturday Night Fever, Cadillac Man		
Susie Essman	1955–	American stand-up comedian, television and film actress	Curb Your Enthusiasm		
Tovah Feldshuh	1952–	American actress, singer, and playwright			
Harvey Fierstein	1954–	American actor, author, and singer			
Roy Firestone	1953–	American sports commentator and journalist			
David Fleeshman	1952–	British actor, broadcaster, lecturer and theatre director	Boys from the Blackstuff, Edge of Darkness, Silent Witness, Trial & Retribution		
Al Franken	1951–	American comedian, actor, author, politician	Saturday Night Live		
Ethan Freeman	1959–	American musical theatre actor	Beauty and the Beast, The Phantom of the Opera		
Stephen Fry	1957–	British comedian, author, actor and filmmaker		Mother	
Mira Furlan	1955–2021	Croatian actress/singer			
Uri Gavriel	1955–	Israeli actor	House of Saddam, The Syrian Bride, The Dark Knight Rises, Fauda		
Brian George	1952–	Canadian, British-Israeli actor			
Joanna Gleason	1950–	Canadian-born actress			
Jeff Goldblum	1952–	American Academy Award–nominated film actor	The Fly, Jurassic Park, Independence Day, Thor: Ragnarok		
Henry Goodman	1950–	British theatre actor			
Steve Guttenberg	1958–	American actor			
Mary Hart	1950–	American former actress and television personality	Entertainment Tonight		
Nina Hartley	1959–	American adult film actress			
Ofra Haza	1957–2000	Israeli actress, singer-songwriter	The Prince of Egypt		
Dominique Horwitz	1957–	French actor	Anne Frank: The Whole Story, Shooting Dogs		
Amy Irving	1953–	American actress			
Moshe Ivgy	1953–	Moroccan-born Israeli actor	Haborer, Zaguri Imperia		
Ron Jeremy	1953–	American adult film actor			
Toni Kalem	1956–	American film, television actress, screenwriter and director			
Carol Kane	1952–	American Academy Award–nominated actress			
Julie Kavner	1950–	American film/television actress	Voice of Marge on The Simpsons		
Richard Kind	1956–	American actor			
Stepfanie Kramer	1956–	American actress	Hunter		
Moshe Ivgy	1953–	Moroccan-born Israeli actor	Haborer, Zaguri Imperia		
Judy Kuhn	1958–	American actress and singer			
Hana Laszlo	1953–	Israeli actress			
Carol Leifer	1956–	American comedian and actress			
Dani Levy	1957–	Swiss/German filmmaker, theatrical director, actor			
Jon Lovitz	1957–	American actor and comedian			
Joan Lunden	1950–	American broadcaster, who also acted	Good Morning America		
Howie Mandel	1955–	Canadian comedian and actor			
Dinah Manoff	1958–	American actress	Grease, I Ought to Be in Pictures, Empty Nest		
Melanie Mayron	1952–	American actress and director	Thirtysomething		
Fred Melamed	1956–	American actor and writer	A Serious Man		
Kay Mellor	1950–	British actress, scriptwriter and director			
Juliano Mer-Khamis	1958–2011	Israeli-Palestinian			
Larry Miller	1953–	American stand-up comedian, actor			
Rick Moranis	1953–	Canadian comic actor	Ghostbusters, Parenthood, Spaceballs, Strange Brew		
Moni Moshonov	1951–	Bulgarian-Israeli actor			
Don Most	1953–	American actor	Happy Days		
Yigal Naor	1958–	Israeli actor	Munich, Rendition, House of Saddam, Green Zone		
Judd Nelson	1959–	American actor	The Breakfast Club		
Bebe Neuwirth	1958–	American Tony Award–winning theater, television, and film	Cheers, Jumanji		
Laraine Newman	1952–	American comedian and actress			
Ken Olin	1954–	American actor, director and producer			
Mandy Patinkin	1952–	American actor of stage and screen			
Lorna Patterson	1956–	American film, stage and television actress		Converted to Judaism	
David Paymer	1954–	American character actor			
Ron Perlman	1950–	American film/television actor	Hellboy		
Kevin Pollak	1957–	American actor, impressionist and comedian			
Paul Reiser	1957–	American actor, author and stand-up comedian	Mad About You		
Paul Reubens	1952–2023	American actor and comedian	Pee-Wee Herman		
Tanya Roberts	1955–2021	American actress	Charlie's Angels, A View to a Kill		
Alan Rosenberg	1950–	American stage and screen actor			
Cecilia Roth	1956–	Argentine actress	What Have I Done to Deserve This?, Antigua, My Life		
Katey Sagal	1954–	American actress, singer, and writer	Married... with Children, Futurama, Sons of Anarchy		
Bob Saget	1956–2022	American actor, stand-up comedian and game show host	Full House, How I Met Your Mother		
Nitza Saul	1950–	Israeli actress	Kessler, Doctor Who: Warriors of the Deep		
Herschel Savage	1955–	American adult film actor and director			
Alexei Sayle	1952–	British actor	The Young Ones		
Richard Schiff	1955–	American actor	The Good Doctor (TV series), The West Wing		
Jerry Seinfeld	1954–	American comedian, actor, and writer	Seinfeld		
Jane Seymour	1951–	British-born film/television actress		Father	
Wendie Jo Sperber	1958–2005	American television/movie actress			
Daniel Stern	1957–	American actor	Home Alone, City Slickers		
Howard Stern	1954–	American radio and TV personality			
Harriet Thorpe	1957–	British actress	Absolutely Fabulous, The Brittas Empire, EastEnders	Mother (Gillian Freeman)	
Stephen Tobolowsky	1951–	American actor	Groundhog Day		
Robert Trebor	1953–2025	American actor	Hercules: The Legendary Journeys, Xena: Warrior Princess		
Debra Winger	1955–	American Academy Award–nominated actress			
Mare Winningham	1959–	American film and television actress		Converted to Judaism	

== Born in the 1940s ==
Name	Years	Nationality/profession	Prominent roles	Jewish lineage	References
Harvey Atkin	1942–2017	Canadian actor	Cagney & Lacey, The Super Mario Bros. Super Show!		
Bob Balaban	1945–	American actor and director	Gosford Park, Waiting for Guffman		
Richard Belzer	1944–2023	American stand-up comedian, writer and actor	Homicide: Life on the Street, Law and Order: Special Victims Unit		
Jeannie Berlin	1949–	Actress	The Heartbreak Kid		
Lewis Black	1948–	American comedian and actor	The Daily Show		
Albert Brooks	1947–	American comedian, actor, writer, and director	Finding Nemo, Broadcast News		
James Caan	1940–2022	American film, stage and television actor	The Godfather, Thief, Misery		
Nell Carter	1948–2003	American singer and actress	Gimme a Break!	Converted to Judaism	
Peter Coyote	1941–	American actor and author	E.T. the Extra-Terrestrial, Jagged Edge, Erin Brockovich		
Billy Crystal	1948–	American actor, comedian, writer and director	When Harry Met Sally, Monsters, Inc.		
Larry David	1947–	American actor, writer, comedian, and producer	Seinfeld, Curb Your Enthusiasm		
Michael Douglas	1944–	American actor and producer	Wall Street, Fatal Attraction	Father	
Richard Dreyfuss	1947–	American actor	Jaws, Close Encounters of the Third Kind, Mr. Holland's Opus		
Bob Einstein	1942–2019	American comedian, known as Super Dave Osborne	Curb Your Enthusiasm		
Predrag Ejdus	1947–2018	Serbian actor		Father	
Richard Elfman	1949–	American film director, writer and actor			
Harrison Ford	1942–	American actor	Star Wars and Indiana Jones series	Mother	
Bonnie Franklin	1944–2013	American actress and singer	One Day at a Time		
Victor Garber	1949–	Canadian actor	Sleepless in Seattle, Alias		
Paul Michael Glaser	1943–	American actor	Starsky & Hutch		
Scott Glenn	1941–	American actor	The Right Stuff, The Silence of the Lambs	Converted to Judaism	
Barry Gordon	1948–	American voice actor	Teenage Mutant Ninja Turtles		
Susan Gordon	1949–2011	American child actress	The Twilight Zone, The Five Pennies		
Stephen Greif	1944–2022	British actor	Blake's 7, The Crown		
Christopher Guest	1948–	American comedian, actor, and director	This Is Spinal Tap, Waiting for Guffman		
Larry Hankin	1940–	American actor/comedian			
Goldie Hawn	1945–	American actress and producer	Private Benjamin, The First Wives Club	Mother	
Anthony Heald	1944–	American television and stage actor	The Silence of the Lambs, Boston Public	Converted to Judaism	
Dan Hedaya	1940–	American character actor	Commando, Clueless, Dick		
Barbara Hershey	1948–	American film actress	Hannah and Her Sisters, Beaches	Father	
Ricky Jay	1948–2018	American magician, actor, and author	House of Games, Boogie Nights		
Madeline Kahn	1942–1999	American film, television, and theater actress	Paper Moon, Young Frankenstein		
Gabe Kaplan	1945–	American actor, comedian, and poker player	Welcome Back, Kotter		
Andy Kaufman	1949–1984	American entertainer	Taxi		
Judy Kaye	1948–	American singer and stage actress	The Phantom of the Opera, Mamma Mia!		
Lainie Kazan	1940–	American actress and singer	My Favorite Year, My Big Fat Greek Wedding		
Robert Klein	1942–	American comedian and actor	The Owl and the Pussycat, How to Lose a Guy in 10 Days		
Richard Kline	1944–	American actor and television director			
Jeroen Krabbé	1944–	Dutch actor	The Living Daylights, The Fugitive		
Michael Lembeck	1948–	American actor and director			
Michael Lerner	1941–2023	American actor	Barton Fink		
Eugene Levy	1946–	Canadian actor, director, producer and writer	American Pie, Schitt's Creek		
Richard Lewis	1947–2024	American comedian and actor	Curb Your Enthusiasm		
Judith Light	1949–	American actress	Who's the Boss?, Transparent		
Maureen Lipman	1946–	British film, television & theatre actress			
Peggy Lipton	1947–2019	American television actress	The Mod Squad, Twin Peaks		
Stephen Macht	1942–	American actor	Raid on Entebbe, Suits		
Janet Margolin	1943–1993	American actress	David and Lisa, Morituri, Take The Money And Run, Ghostbusters II		
Miriam Margolyes	1941–	British-Australian character actress			
Richard Masur	1948–	American actor	Risky Business, Transparent		
Bette Midler	1945–	American singer and actress	The Rose, Ruthless People, For the Boys		
Andrei Mironov	1941–1987	Soviet actor	The Twelve Chairs, Unbelievable Adventures of Italians in Russia, The Diamond Arm		
Frank Oz	1944–	American film director, actor and puppeteer	Yoda in the Star Wars films, The Muppets		
Rhea Perlman	1948–	American actress	Cheers		
David Proval	1942–	American actor	The Sopranos		
Gilda Radner	1946–1989	American comedian and actress	Saturday Night Live		
Harold Ramis	1944–2014	American actor, director, and writer	Ghostbusters		
Harry Reems	1947–2013	American theater and adult film actor			
Rob Reiner	1947–2025	American actor, producer, and director	All in the Family, Bullets Over Broadway		
Peter Riegert	1947–	American actor	Local Hero, The Mask		
Andrew Rubin	1946–2015	American actor	Police Academy		
Saul Rubinek	1948–	Canadian actor	Wall Street, Unforgiven		
Seka Sablić	1942–	Serbian actress			
Garry Shandling	1949–2016	American comedian and actor	The Larry Sanders Show, Iron Man 2		
Wallace Shawn	1943–	American actor and writer	The Princess Bride, Toy Story		
Harry Shearer	1943–	American comedic actor and writer	This Is Spinal Tap, The Simpsons		
Antony Sher	1949–2021	South African-born British actor	The Wind in the Willows, Shakespeare in Love		
Ron Silver	1946–2009	American film/television actor	The West Wing, Reversal of Fortune		
Brent Spiner	1949–	American actor	Star Trek: The Next Generation		
Sylvester Stallone	1946–	American actor			
Ben Stein	1944–	American actor, lawyer, economist, and former White House speechwriter	Ferris Bueller's Day Off, The Mask		
David Steinberg	1942–	Canadian comedian, writer, director and actor	The End, Something Short of Paradise		
Jill St. John	1940–	American actress	Diamonds Are Forever, Come Blow Your Horn		
Marcia Strassman	1948–2014	American actress	Welcome Back, Kotter		
Barbra Streisand	1942–	American singer, actress, producer and director	Funny Girl, The Way We Were, The Prince of Tides		
Jeffrey Tambor	1944–	American actor	Arrested Development, Transparent		
Teller	1948–	American actor	Miami Vice, Penn & Teller: Fool Us		
Jessica Walter	1941–2021	American actress	Play Misty for Me, Arrested Development		
Zoë Wanamaker	1949–	American-born British actress	Harry Potter and the Sorcerer's Stone, My Week with Marilyn		
Lesley Ann Warren	1946–	American actress	Victor/Victoria, Secretary		
Bruce Weitz	1943–	American actor	Hill Street Blues, General Hospital		
Anson Williams	1949–	American actor	Happy Days		
Henry Winkler	1945–	American actor, director, producer and author	Happy Days, Barry		

== Born in the 1930s ==
Name	Years	Nationality/profession	Prominent Roles	Jewish lineage	References
Anouk Aimée	1932–2024	French film actress		Converted to Judaism	
Corey Allen	1934–2010	American film and television director, writer, producer, and actor			
Woody Allen	1935–	American Academy Award–winning film director, writer, actor, and comedian			
Alan Arkin	1934–2023	American Academy Award–winning film actor, director			
Barbara Bain	1931–	American actress			
Barbara Barrie	1931–	American actress and author			
Richard Benjamin	1938–	American actor and film director			
Steven Berkoff	1937–	British actor, writer and director			
Peter Birrel	1935–2004	British actor	Alexander the Greatest		
Claire Bloom	1931–	British film and stage actress			
Bernard Bresslaw	1934–1993	British comedian and actor			
May Britt	1934–	Swedish film actress		Converted to Judaism	
Eleanor Bron	1938–	British actress			
Dyan Cannon	1937–	American three-time Academy Award–nominated film and television actress, editor, producer and director		Mother	
Eddie Carmel	1936–1972	American entertainer known as "The Jewish Giant"			
Joan Collins	1933–	British actress and author		Father	
Jerry Douglas	1932–2021	American television actor	The Young and the Restless		
Herb Edelman	1933–1996	American stage, film, and television actor	The Golden Girls		
Marty Feldman	1934–1982	British writer, comedian and film and television actor			
Sami Frey	1937–	French actor and director			
Yehoram Gaon	1939–	Israeli actor and musician			
Allen Garfield	1939–2020	American actor			
Elliott Gould	1938–	American actor			
Charles Grodin	1935–2021	American actor and former cable talk show host	Rosemary's Baby, Beethoven		
Judd Hirsch	1935–	American actor	Taxi, NUMB3RS		
Dustin Hoffman	1937–	American two-time Oscar-winning actor			
Neville Jason	1934–2015	British actor	Maigret, From Russia with Love		
Tony Jay	1933–2006	British-born American actor	Beauty and the Beast, The Hunchback of Notre Dame		
Jerome Charles Kattan	1937–2010	American			
Harvey Keitel	1939–	Academy Award–nominated American actor	Taxi Driver, Pulp Fiction, U-571		
Walter Koenig	1936–2026	American actor, writer, teacher and director	Star Trek		
Susan Kohner	1936–	American Academy Award–nominated, Golden Globe–winning American actress		Father	
Yaphet Kotto	1939–2021	American actor	Live and Let Die, Alien		
Steve Landesberg	1936–2010	American comic actor	Barney Miller		
Michael Landon	1936–1991	American actor, producer and director		Father	
Louise Lasser	1939–	American stage/film/television actress	Mary Hartman, Mary Hartman		
Piper Laurie	1932–2023	American actress	Carrie (1976)		
Linda Lavin	1937–2024	American Tony Award and Golden Globe Award–winning stage, film and television actress and singer			
Steve Lawrence	1935–2024	American singer and actor	The Carol Burnett Show		
Shari Lewis	1933–1998	American ventriloquist, puppeteer, singer, actress, and children's television show host, popular during the 1960s			
Hal Linden	1931–	American actor and television director			
Tina Louise	1934–	American model, singer, and film and television actress			
Mark Margolis	1939–2023	American actor	Scarface, Breaking Bad, Better Call Saul		
David Margulies	1937–2016	American actor	Ghostbusters, Ghostbusters II, The Sopranos		
Jackie Mason	1931–2021	American stand-up comedian/actor			
Elaine May	1932–	American screenwriter, film director, actress, and comedian	A New Leaf		
Paul Mazursky	1930–2014	American film director and actor			
Shelley Morrison	1936–2019	American actress			
Nadira	1932–2006	Indian Bollywood actress			
Derren Nesbitt	1935–	English actor			
Anthony Newley	1931–1999	British actor, singer-songwriter			
Barry Newman	1938–2023	American actor			
Leonard Nimoy	1931–2015	American actor, film director, poet, musician and photographer			
Alan Oppenheimer	1930–	American actor			
Noam Pitlik	1932–1999	Emmy-winning American actor and television director			
Ron Rifkin	1939–	American actor, director			
Joan Rivers	1933–2014	American comedian, actress, talk show host, and celebrity			
Andrew Sachs	1930–2016	German-born British actor			
Neil Sedaka	1939–	American musician and actor			
George Segal	1934–2021	American film and stage actor			
William Shatner	1931–	Canadian Emmy and Golden Globe Award–winning actor			
Susan Strasberg	1938–1999	American actress	In Praise of Older Women		
Janet Suzman	1939–	South African actress and director			
Dame Elizabeth Taylor	1932–2011	British-American Academy Award–winner, film actress & humanitarian		Converted to Judaism	
Renée Taylor	1933–	American-born actress	The Nanny		
Chaim Topol	1935–2023	Israeli theatrical and film performer			
Al Waxman	1935–2001	Canadian actor	King of Kensington		
Gene Wilder	1933–2016	American actor and comedian			
Mike & Bernie Winters	1926–2013; 1930–1991	British double act of comedians (brothers)			
Henry Woolf	1930–2021	British actor	The Rocky Horror Picture Show, Superman III		
Toba Etta Metz	1930–	American Dialogue Director			

== Born in the 1920s ==
Name	Years	Nationality/profession	Prominent roles	Jewish lineage	References
Jerry Adler	1929–2025	American actor	The Sopranos, Rescue Me, Prime		
Ed Ames	1927–2023	American singer and actor			
Beatrice Arthur	1922–2009	American actress			
Ed Asner	1929–2021	American actor			
Lauren Bacall	1924–2014	American Golden Globe and Tony Award–winning, and Academy Award–nominated, film and stage actress			
Gábor Baraker	1926–1983	Hungarian actor	Thunderball, Inspector Clouseau		
John Barrard	1924–2013	English actor	Santa Claus: The Movie		
Alfie Bass	1921–1987	British character actor			
Julian Beck	1925–1985	American actor, director, poet, and painter			
John Bennett	1928–2005	English actor	The House That Dripped Blood, The Talons of Weng-Chiang		
Shelley Berman	1926–2017	American comedian, writer, teacher, and actor			
Herschel Bernardi	1923–1986	American film, Broadway and television actor			
Turhan Bey	1922–2012	Austrian-American actor			
Theodore Bikel	1924–2015	Austrian-born British character actor, folk singer and musician			
Larry Blyden	1925–1975	American actor			
Lloyd Bochner	1924–2005	Canadian film and television actor			
Tom Bosley	1927–2010	American film/television actor	Happy Days		
Mel Brooks	1926–	American EGOT–winning actor, writer, director and producer			
June Brown	1927–2022	British actress, converted to Christianity	EastEnders		
Lenny Bruce	1925–1966	American actor, stand-up comedian, writer, social critic and satirist			
Susan Cabot	1927–1986	American actress			
Sid Caesar	1922–2014	American comic actor and writer			
Robert Clary	1926–2022	French-born American actor, published author, and lecturer			
Tony Curtis	1925–2010	American actor	Spartacus, The Persuaders!		
Rodney Dangerfield	1921–2004	American comedian and actor			
Sammy Davis Jr.	1925–1990	American entertainer	Member of the "Rat Pack"	Converted to Judaism in 1961	
Danny Dayton	1923–1999	American actor	All in the Family, M*A*S*H, The Incredible Hulk, The Love Boat		
Freddie Earlle	1924–2007	Scottish actor	Clochemerle, Yanks Go Home		
Robert Ellenstein	1923–2010	American actor	The Lawless Years, Perry Mason		
Peter Falk	1927–2011	American actor	Columbo		
Leonard Fenton	1926–2022	British actor	EastEnders		
Fenella Fielding	1927–2018	British actress	Carry On Screaming!		
Fyvush Finkel	1923–2016	American actor	Picket Fences, Boston Public		
Eddie Fisher	1928–2010	American singer	Father of Carrie Fisher		
Paul Frees	1920–1986	American actor			
Estelle Getty	1923–2008	American actress	The Golden Girls		
David Graham	1925–2024	British actor	Stingray, Thunderbirds		
Lee Grant	1925–	American Academy Award–winning theater, film and television actress, and film director			
Buddy Hackett	1924–2003	American comedian and actor			
Monty Hall	1921–2017	Canadian-born actor, singer and sportscaster	Let's Make a Deal		
Estelle Harris	1928–2022	American-born actress, daughter of Polish Jewish immigrants	Seinfeld		
Laurence Harvey	1928–1973	Lithuanian-born actor, achieved fame in British and American films			
Steven Hill	1922–2016	American film and television actor			
Judy Holliday	1921–1965	American Academy Award–winning actress and singer			
Conrad Janis	1928-2022	American actor	Mork and Mindy		
Rick Jason	1923–2000	American actor	Combat!		
Miriam Karlin	1925–2011	British actress	The Rag Trade		
Alan King	1927–2004	American comedian and actor			
Werner Klemperer	1920–2000	German-born American Emmy Award–winning comedic actor			
Jack Klugman	1922–2012	American actor			
Harvey Korman	1927–2008	American actor			
Jack Kruschen	1922–2002	Canadian actor			
Martin Landau	1928–2017	American Academy Award–winning American film and television actor			
Stan Lee	1922–2018	American comic-book writer, editor, film executive producer, actor, and publisher.	Marvel, Himself	Romanian Jewish	
Al Lewis	1920–2006	American actor	Best known as Grandpa Munster		
Jerry Lewis	1926–2017	American comedian, actor, film producer, writer and director known for his slapstick humor and his charity fund-raising telethons			
Bill Macy	1922–2019	American actor	Maude		
Ross Martin	1920–1981	Polish-born American TV and film actor	The Wild Wild West		
Walter Matthau	1920–2000	American Academy Award–winning actor			
Anne Meara	1929–2015	American comedian and actress; partner and wife of Jerry Stiller		Converted to Judaism	
Sylvia Miles	1924–2019	American actress			
Laurie Mitchell	1928–2018	American actress			
Warren Mitchell	1926–2015	British-Australian actor			
Yvonne Mitchell	1925–1979	British stage, television and film actress			
Marilyn Monroe	1926–1962	American actress, singer and model		Converted to Judaism	
Ron Moody	1924–2015	British film actor	Oliver!		
Chesty Morgan	1928–	Polish-born American actress/ exotic entertainer			
Aubrey Morris	1926–2015	British actor			
Wolfe Morris	1925–1996	British actor			
Vic Morrow	1929–1982	American actor			
Paul Newman	1925–2008	American Academy and Golden Globe Award–winning actor, director		Father was Jewish	
Jerry Paris	1925–1986	Emmy Award-winning actor and director	The Dick Van Dyke Show, Happy Days		
Charlotte Rae	1926–2018	American actress and singer	The Facts of Life		
Tony Randall	1920–2004	American actor			
Carl Reiner	1922–2020	American actor, film director, producer, writer and comedian			
Regina Resnik	1922–2013	American opera singer and actress			
Don Rickles	1926–2017	American comedian, film actor, and voice actor			
Doris Roberts	1925–2016	American Emmy Award–winning actress	Everybody Loves Raymond		
Fred Sadoff	1926–1994	American actor	South Pacific		
Marian Seldes	1928–2014	American radio, stage, television, and film actress	Home Alone 3	Daughter of George Seldes; she self-identified as Jewish	
Peter Sellers	1925–1980	British comedian, actor, and performer		Mother	
Rod Serling	1924–1975	American screenwriter and actor	The Twilight Zone, Night Gallery		
Cyril Shaps	1923–2003	English actor	Doctor Who, The Liver Birds		
Simone Signoret	1921–1985	French Academy Award–winning actress		Father	
Beverly Sills	1929–2007	American operatic soprano			
Paul Sparer	1923–1999	American character actor	Somerset, Another World		
Gordon Sterne	1923–2017	German actor	An American Werewolf in London, Highlander		
Jerry Stiller	1927–2020	American comedian and actor	Seinfeld		
Leonard Stone	1923–2011	American actor	Willy Wonka & the Chocolate Factory		
Larry Storch	1923-2022	American actor	"F Troop"		
Mel Tormé	1925–1999	American actor and singer	Known as one of the great male jazz singers		
Harry Towb	1925–2009	Northern Irish actor			
Abe Vigoda	1921–2016	American film/television actor	The Godfather, Barney Miller		
Shelley Winters	1920–2006	American two-time Academy Award–winning actress			
Arnold Yarrow	1920–2024	British actor, screenwriter and novelist			

== Born in the 1910s ==
Name	Years	Nationality/profession	Prominent roles	Jewish lineage	References
Mason Adams	1919–2005	American character actor	The Final Conflict		
Jean-Pierre Aumont	1911–2001	French-born actor			
Martin Balsam	1919–1996	American actor, Academy award winner	A Thousand Clowns		
John Banner	1910–1973	Austrian/American actor	Hogan's Heroes		
Gene Barry	1919-2009	American actor	"Bat Masterson"		
Red Buttons	1919–2006	American Academy Award–winning comedian and actor			
Kitty Carlisle Hart	1910–2007	American singer, actress, and spokeswoman for the arts			
William Castle	1914–1977	American actor and filmmaker			
Jeff Chandler	1918–1961	American film actor			
Lee J. Cobb	1911–1976	American film actor, Academy Award–nominated			
Arnold Diamond	1915–1992	English actor	In Sickness and in Health		
Anton Diffring	1916–1989	German actor			
Kirk Douglas	1916–2020	American film star	Spartacus		
Rahela Ferari	1911–1994	Serbian actor			
June Foray	1917–2017	American voice actress			
Eva Gabor	1919–1995	Hungarian-American socialite, film star	Aristocats, Gigi, Star Spangled Rhythm, etc.		
Zsa Zsa Gabor	1917–2016	Hungarian-American socialite, film star, former beauty queen	(Moulin Rouge 1952)		
John Garfield	1913–1952	American actor, 1940s film star			
Henry Gilbert	1913–1973	English-Australian actor	Long John Silver		
Rosalee Glass	1917-2019	Commercial actress in a Super Bowl commercial and star of documentary film Reinventing Rosalee, senior beauty queen			
Lorne Greene	1915–1987	Canadian actor known for roles on American television			
Sid James	1913–1976	British film and television actor and comedian	Carry On films, Hancock's Half Hour		
Danny Kaye	1911–1987	American film actor, singer and comedian			
Stubby Kaye	1918–1997	American actor, comedian, vaudevillian and singer,	Guys and Dolls		
David Kossoff	1919–2005	British actor	The Larkins, A Kid for Two Farthings, The Bespoke Overcoat, Freud: The Secret Passion, The Mouse that Roared, The Mouse on the Moon		
Hedy Lamarr	1914–2000	Austrian born actress			
Marc Lawrence	1910–2005	American character actor	The Man with the Golden Gun, From Dusk till Dawn		
Tutte Lemkow	1918–1991	Norwegian actor	Fiddler on the Roof		
Herbert Lom	1917–2012	British actor			
Howard Morris	1919–2005	American actor			
Zero Mostel	1915–1977	American stage and film actor			
Leila Mourad	1891–1951	Egyptian actress and singer			
Jan Murray	1916–2006	American stand-up comedian, actor			
Hana Maria Pravda	1916–2008	Czech actress	Death Wish 3		
Luise Rainer	1910–2014	German-born British-based American two-time Academy Award–winning film actress			
Lillian Roth	1910–1980	American singer and actress, noted performer on Broadway			
Dinah Shore	1916–1994	American singer and actress			
Sylvia Sidney	1910–1999	American stage, film, and television actress			
Phil Silvers	1911–1985	American entertainer and comedy actor			
Zypora Spaisman	1916–2002	Polish-American Yiddish theater actress and empresaria			
Bernard Spear	1919–2003	British actor	Daleks' Invasion Earth 2150 A.D., Wombling Free		
Milo Sperber	1911–1992	Polish actor	The Spy Who Loved Me, Are You Being Served?		
Harold J. Stone	1913–2005	American film and television character actor			
Alan Tilvern	1918–2003	British actor	Who Framed Roger Rabbit		
Mike Wallace	1918–2012	American journalist, who briefly acted during the 1940s			
Eli Wallach	1915–2014	American film, TV and stage actor	The Magnificent Seven, The Good, the Bad and the Ugly, The Godfather III		
Sam Wanamaker	1919–1993	American actor and director			
Cornel Wilde	1912–1989	American actor			
Joseph Wiseman	1918–2009	Canadian actor	Dr. No		

== Born in the 1900s ==
Name	Years	Nationality/profession	Prominent roles	Jewish lineage	References
Stella Adler	1901–1992	American actress	For decades regarded as America's foremost acting teacher		
Jack Albertson	1907–1981	American actor	Willy Wonka and the Chocolate Factory		
Morey Amsterdam	1908–1996	American actor	The Dick Van Dyke Show		
Leon Askin	1907–2005	Austrian actor			
Mischa Auer	1905–1967	Russian-American actor			
Bea Benaderet	1906–1968	American actress			
Milton Berle	1908–2002	American comedian and actor			
Joe Besser	1907–1988	American comedian and actor	One of the Three Stooges comedy team from 1955 to 1958		
Mel Blanc	1908–1989	American voice actor	Voice of Bugs Bunny and Daffy Duck		
Victor Borge	1909–2000	Danish-American comedian and pianist	Liszt's Hungarian Rhapsody No. 2		
Ricardo Cortez	1900–1977	American silent film star, known as a "Latin lover" type			
Howard Da Silva	1909–1986	American film actor			
Melvyn Douglas	1901–1981	American actor, won all three of the entertainment industries' highest awards, two Oscars, a Tony and an Emmy		Father	
Douglas Fairbanks Jr.	1909–2000	American actor	Gunga Din (1939)		
Larry Fine	1902–1975	American comedian and actor	One of the Three Stooges comedy team		
Leo Genn	1905–1978	British actor			
John Houseman	1902–1988	American actor. Academy Award winner	The Paper Chase (1973)	Father	
Curly Howard	1903–1952	American comedian and actor	One of the Three Stooges comedy team from 1932 to 1946, brother of Moe and Shemp Howard		
Delia de Leon	1901–1993	British stage actress			
Sam Levene	1905–1980	Russian/American stage and film actor			
Peter Lorre	1904–1964	Hungarian-born stage and screen actor	Casablanca (1942)		
Zeppo Marx	1901–1979	American comedian and actor	One of the Marx Brothers		
Sanford Meisner	1905–1997	American actor			
Otto Preminger	1905–1986	Austrian director and actor	Stalag 17 (1953)		
Lee Strasberg	1901–1982	American actor			
Chaim Towber	1901–1972	American actor, playwright, musician			
Herman Yablokoff	1903–1981	American stage actor, singer, composer, poet, director and producer of Yiddish theatre	Papirossen (1935)		

== Born in the 1890s ==
Name	Years	Nationality/profession	Prominent roles	Jewish lineage	References
Jack Benny	1894–1974	American comedian, vaudeville performer, and radio, television, and film actor			
Gertrude Berg	1899–1966	American radio and television actress	1951 Emmy Award for Lead Actress in a Television Series as Molly Goldberg in "The Goldbergs", which she also wrote.		
Elisabeth Bergner	1897–1986	Austrian film actress			
Fanny Brice	1891–1951	American comedian, singer, and entertainer			
George Burns	1896–1996	American comedian and actor			
Eddie Cantor	1892–1964	American comedian, singer, actor, songwriter	One of the most popular entertainers in the U.S. in the early and middle 20th century		
Michael Chekhov	1891–1955	Russian-American Academy Award–nominated actor, director	Nephew of Anton Chekhov, protege of Konstantin Stanislavski		
Hermione Gingold	1897–1987	British actress			
Harold Goldblatt	1899–1982	(Northern) Irish actor	A Night to Remember		
Jetta Goudal	1891–1985	Dutch-American actress			
Leslie Howard	1893–1943	British film actor	Gone with the Wind		
Moe Howard	1897–1975	American comedian and actor	The "leader" of the Three Stooges comedy team, brother of Curly and Shemp Howard		
Shemp Howard	1895–1955	American comedian and actor	Part of the Three Stooges comedy team until 1932 and from 1946 to 1955, brother of Curly and Moe Howard		
Sam Jaffe	1891–1984	American film and stage actor	Academy Award–nominated		
Ida Kaminska	1899–1980	Polish Academy Award–nominated actress			
Francis Lederer	1899–2000	Czech-born actor			
Ernst Lubitsch	1892–1947	German-American filmmaker and actor			
Lilyan Tashman	1896–1934	American actor			
Groucho Marx	1890–1977	American comedian and actor	Worked both with his siblings, the Marx Brothers, and on his own		
Gummo Marx	1893–1977	American comedian and actor	One of the Marx Brothers		
Solomon Mikhoels	1890–1948	Soviet actor and director in Yiddish theater	Chairman of the Jewish Anti-Fascist Committee		
Martin Miller	1899–1969	Czech actor	The Pink Panther		
Paul Muni	1895–1967	American Academy Award– and Tony Award–winning actor			
Carmel Myers	1899–1980	American silent film actress			
Julius Nathanson	1890–1957	American actor and comedian			
Irving Pichel	1891–1954	American actor and director	Dracula's Daughter		
Molly Picon	1898–1992	American star of stage, screen and television			
Gregory Ratoff	1893–1960	Russian-American actor, director and producer	All About Eve		
Edward G. Robinson	1893–1973	American stage and film actor			
Joseph Schildkraut	1896–1964	Austrian-born stage and film actor			
Frederick Schrecker	1892–1976	Austrian actor	The Trollenberg Terror		
Meier Tzelniker	1894–1980	British actor	Appeared in Yiddish theatre		

== Born in the 1880s ==
Name	Years	Nationality/profession	Prominent roles	Jewish lineage	References
Broncho Billy Anderson	1880–1971	American actor, writer, director, and producer	Perhaps best known as the first star of the Western film genre		
Theda Bara	1885–1955	American silent film actress	Known as the first screen "Vamp"		
Cecil B. DeMille	1881–1959	American director and filmmaker		Mother	
Douglas Fairbanks	1883–1939	American actor		Father	
Menahem Gnessin	1882–1952	Jewish actor and Hebrew language instructor			
Al Jolson	1886–1950	American singer and actor			
Chico Marx	1887–1961	American comedian and actor	One of the Marx Brothers		
Harpo Marx	1888–1964	American comedian and actor	One of the Marx Brothers		
Ida Rubinstein	1885–1960	Famous Russian Belle Époque beauty			
Vladimir Sokoloff	1889–1962	Russian actor in German and French silents and American talkies			
Ludwig Stössel	1883–1973	Austrian actor			
Sophie Tucker	1884–1966	American actress, singer and comedian			
Erich von Stroheim	1885–1957	Austrian-born filmmaker and actor			
Ed Wynn	1886–1966	American comedian and actor			
S. Z. Sakall	1883–1955	Hungarian-American character actor	Casablanca		

== Born in the mid-19th century ==
Name	Years	Nationality/profession	Prominent roles	Jewish lineage	References
Jacob Pavlovitch Adler	1855–1926	Russian-born (later American) actor, a star of the Yiddish theatre			
Oscar Beregi Sr.	1876–1965	Hungarian stage and film actor	Father of Oscar Beregi		
Sarah Bernhardt	1844–1923	French stage actress			
Anna Held	1872–1918	Polish-born stage performer	Most often associated with impresario Florenz Ziegfeld, her common-law husband		
Adah Isaacs Menken	1835–1868	American actress and poet			
Alla Nazimova	1879–1945	American theater and film actress, scriptwriter, and producer			
Henriette Nissen-Saloman	1819–1879	Swedish singer and actress			
Rachel	1820–1858	French stage actress			
Rudolph Schildkraut	1862–1930	Austrian-American theater and film actor	Father of Joseph Schildkraut		
Al Shean	1868–1949	German-American actor and comedian	Uncle of the Marx Brothers		
Boris Thomashefsky	1868–1939	Ukrainian-born (later American) singer and actor	Grandfather of conductor Michael Tilson Thomas		
Rudolph Marks	circa 1867–1930	Ukrainian-born (later American) actor, comedian and playwright			
