= Broken Mirror (disambiguation) =

"Broken Mirror" is a song released in 2012 by Japanese electronica/rock duo Boom Boom Satellites.

Broken Mirror can also refer to:

== Film, television ==
- Broken Mirror (film), a 2014 Ghanaian drama film
- Broken Mirrors, a 2019 Israeli drama film
- "Broken Mirror", an episode from the first season of the television series Criminal Minds
- "Pieces of a Broken Mirror", an episode of the fourth season of the television series Gotham

== Other ==
- "Broken Mirror" (破鏡), a single from Hong Kong Cantopop boy group Mirror
- EverQuest: The Broken Mirror, the 22nd expansion pack for the MMORPG EverQuest released in 2015
- The "Broken Mirrors" theory of autism, proposed by V. S. Ramachandran
