= Asia (film) =

2020 Israeli drama film directed by Ruthy Pribar

- Theatrical release poster
- אסיה
- Directed by: Ruthy Pribar
- Written by: Ruthy Pribar
- Produced by: Yoav Roeh; Aurit Zamir; Janja Kralj (associate)
- Starring: Alena Yiv; Shira Haas
- Cinematography: Daniella Nowitz
- Edited by: Neta Dvorkis
- Distributed by: Menemsha Films
- Release date: April 17, 2020 (Tribeca)
- Running time: 85 minutes
- Country: Israel
- Languages: Hebrew; Russian

Asia (Hebrew: אסיה) is a 2020 Israeli drama film directed by Ruthy Pribar, starring Alena Yiv and Shira Haas. The film was premiered online at the 2020 Tribeca Film Festival (due to the COVID-19 pandemic), where it won the awards for Best Actress (Shira Haas), Best Cinematography (Daniella Nowitz) as well as the Nora Ephron Prize (Ruthy Pribar). After winning Best Picture at the 30th Israeli Academy Awards (Ophir Awards), it was automatically submitted as the Israeli entry for the Best International Feature Film at the 93rd Academy Awards, but it was not nominated.

The film won eight additional Israeli Academy Awards (Ophir Awards) out of a total twelve nominations, including both Best Leading Actress and Best Supporting Actress. Menemsha Films gained North American distribution rights to the film in June 2020, and announced its theatrical premiere at Film Forum in New York City in 2020.

== Synopsis ==
Asia (35) and Vika (17) are a mother and daughter living side by side, close yet distant. Asia, who became a mother at too young an age, struggles to understand and connect with her teenage daughter. Asia prefers to focus on her work as a nurse, while Vika spends most of her time at the skatepark with her friends. When Vika's health begins to deteriorate, Asia realizes she must try to become the mother Vika so desperately needs. Vika's condition becomes an opportunity for both of them to rediscover each other.

== Premise ==
Asia is a mother-daughter drama film. A thirty-five year old single mother named Asia immigrated to Jerusalem from Russia with her daughter Vika, where she works as a nurse at a hospital. IndieWire wrote:

Asia is not your average mom. She’s free-spirited, open-minded and non-judgmental; but all that is put to the test when her teenage daughter – who happens to be differently abled – announces that she’s ready to lose her virginity.

== Cast ==
- Alena Yiv as Asia
- Shira Haas as Vika
- Tamir Mula as Gabi
- Gera Sandler as Stas
- Eden Halili as Natalie
- Or Barak as Roy
- Nadia Tichonova as Valentina
- Mirna Fridman as Rose
- Tatiana Machlinovski as Lena
- Evgeny Tarlatzky as Boris

== Production ==
Filming for Asia took place in late 2018. The film was edited by Neta Dvorkis and produced by Yoav Roeh and Aurit Zamir with casting direction by Esther Kling, the same director who assigned Shira Haas with her award-winning debut role in Princess (2014).

== Release ==
Asia premiered online at the 2020 Tribeca Film Festival, which could not take place physically due to the COVID-19 pandemic. The film is spoken in Hebrew and Russian with English subtitles. The movie had its first screening on 17 April 2020

== Reception ==
=== Critical response ===
As of October 2021, the film holds a 93% approval rating on Rotten Tomatoes, based on 29 reviews with an average rating of 7.3/10. The site's critical consensus reads, "An intelligent and touching portrait of a family at odds, Asia is an auspicious feature directorial debut for writer-director Ruthy Pribar." Eric John of IndieWire described the film as "A modest, intimate mother-daughter drama with one of the most wrenching finales in recent memory." David Rooney of The Hollywood Reporter wrote "Ruthy Pribar makes an assured feature debut, balancing sobriety with emotional intensity in Asia"

=== Accolades ===
After premiering at the Tribeca Film Festival, the film won 3 awards: Best International Actress for Shira Haas, Best Cinematography for Daniella Nowitz and the Nora Ephron Prize for Ruthy Pribar. The latter is a $25,000 prize awarded to a female writer or filmmaker "with a distinctive voice". The jury of the festival (incl. Danny Boyle, William Hurt) wrote about Haas: "Her face is a never-ending landscape in which even the tiniest expression is heartbreaking; she’s an incredibly honest and present actress who brings depth to everything she does." After winning Best Picture at the 30th Israeli Academy Awards (Ophir Awards), it was automatically selected as the Israeli entry for consideration for Best International Feature Film at the 93rd Academy Awards.

List of awards and nominations
Year	Award	Category	Nominee(s)	Result	Ref.
2020	Israeli Academy Awards (Ophir Awards)	Best Picture	Ruthy Pribar	Won	
2020	Israeli Academy Awards (Ophir Awards)	Best Lead Actress	Alena Yiv	Won	
2020	Israeli Academy Awards (Ophir Awards)	Best Supporting Actress	Shira Haas	Won	
2020	Israeli Academy Awards (Ophir Awards)	Best Editing	Neta Dvorkis	Won	
2020	Israeli Academy Awards (Ophir Awards)	Best Casting	Esther Kling	Won	
2020	Israeli Academy Awards (Ophir Awards)	Best Original Score	Karni Postel	Won	
2020	Israeli Academy Awards (Ophir Awards)	Best Photography	Daniella Nowitz	Won	
2020	Israeli Academy Awards (Ophir Awards)	Best Art Direction	Tamar Gadish	Won	
2020	Israeli Academy Awards (Ophir Awards)	Best Makeup	Hila Elkayam	Won	
2020	Israeli Academy Awards (Ophir Awards)	Best Director	Ruthy Pribar	Nominated	
2020	Israeli Academy Awards (Ophir Awards)	Best Original Screenplay	Ruthy Pribar	Nominated	
2020	Israeli Academy Awards (Ophir Awards)	Best Sound Design	Amir Buberman, Seagull & Gull	Nominated	
2020	Israeli Academy Awards (Ophir Awards)	Best Costume Design	Inbal Shuki	Nominated	

== See also ==
- List of submissions to the 93rd Academy Awards for Best International Feature Film
- List of Israeli submissions for the Academy Award for Best International Feature Film
