= Yoav Rotman =

Israeli film and television actor (born 1995)

- יואב רוטמן
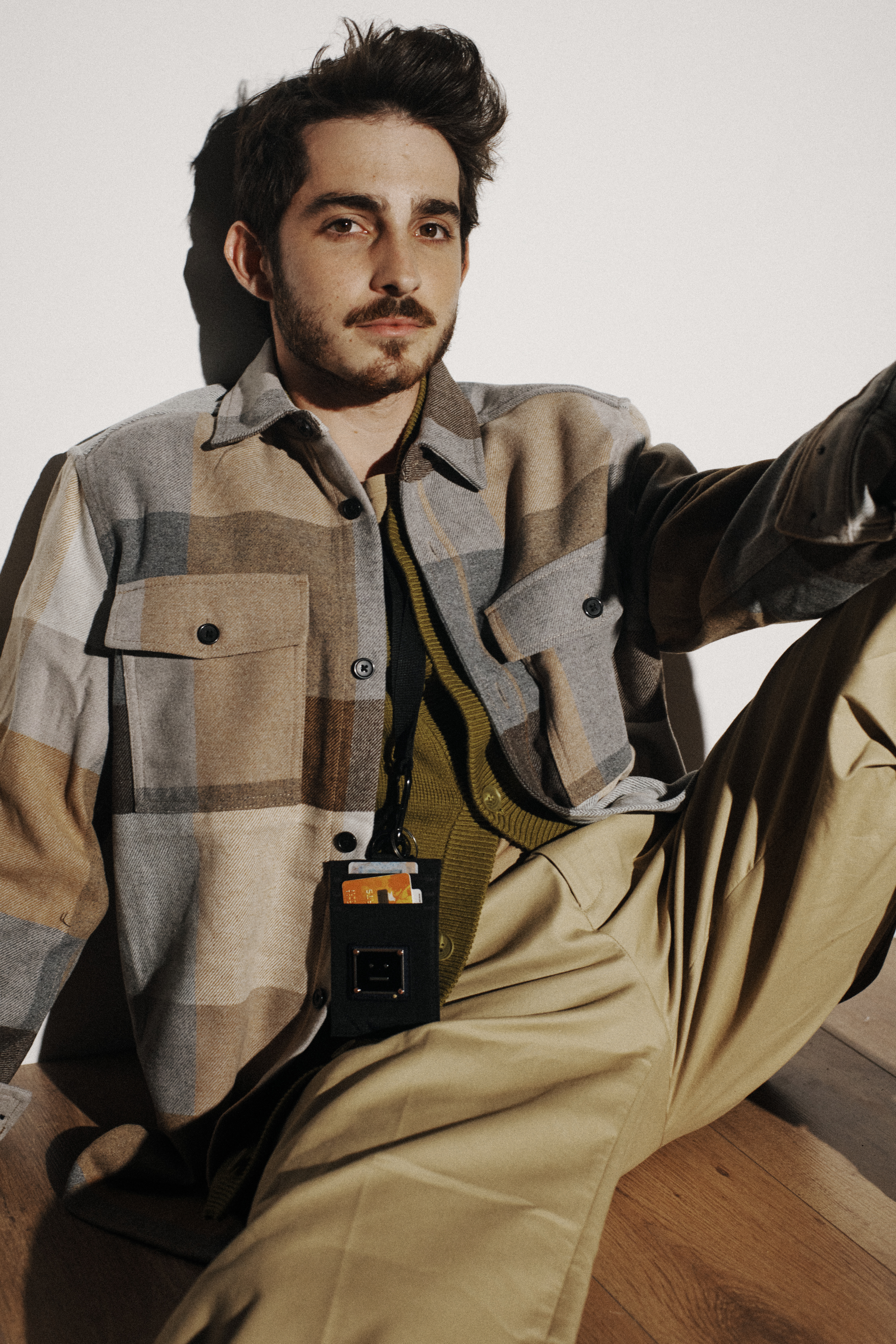
- Born: 24 February 1995 (age 31); Kadima, Israel
- Occupation: Actor

Yoav Rotman (Hebrew: יואב רוטמן; born 24 February 1995) is an Israeli film, television and stage actor.

== Early life and education ==
He was born and raised in Kadima. He studied at the Thelma Yellin High School of Arts and graduated in 2013. As a conscript in the Israel Defense Forces, he served with the theater unit of the Israeli military ensembles.

== Career ==
He landed his first television role in 2008, playing Yaacov for two seasons in the drama series, Loving Anna (Le'ehov Et Anna) directed by Zion Rubin. In 2010, he played a leading role in Guy Nattiv's drama film, Mabul (The Flood), where he played Yoni Rushko alongside the actress Ronit Elkabetz. He earned an Ophir Award nomination for Best Actor for his performance.

In 2013, he appeared alongside Ayelet Zurer, Jonah Lotan and Tomer Kapon in the Channel 10 drama series, Hostages (Bnei Aruba). In the series, directed by Rotem Shapir, he played Assaf Danon, a member of the family that is taken hostage.

In 2015, he began playing Hanina Tonik, a Haredi teenager in the hit Israeli drama series, Shtisel. He played the love interest and eventual husband of Shira Haas' character. He returned for the third season in 2020.

In 2016, he appeared in the drama film, Beyond the Mountains and Hills (Me'Ever Laharim Velagvaot). In 2018, he reunited with his Shtisel co-star, Haas, appearing in the drama film, Broken Mirrors.

In 2019, he had a recurring role in the Israeli-American miniseries Our Boys. He played Yochi, a youth who cooperates with the Shin Bet. The following year he played Itamar in the Israeli thriller TV series, Black Space, which was broadcast internationally on Netflix.

In 2024, he appeared alongside Daniel Litman in a musical drama, Victory, set during the Six Day War. Haaretz described the film as "a colorful yet surprisingly complex musical that is all too relevant to today's Israel." In the same year he had a supporting role in the Holocaust drama television series, The Tattooist of Auschwitz.

== Filmography ==
Year	Title	Role	Notes
2008	Loving Anna (Le'ehov Et Anna)	Yaacov	
2010	Mabul (The Flood)	Yoni Roshko	Nomination - Ophir Award for Best Actor
2013	Auschwitz on My Mind	Roy Gilboa	Short
2013	Hostages (Bnei Aruba)	Assaf Danon	Series regular
2014	The Nerd Club	Yotam	Series regular
2014	Antilopot	Barak	Short
2015	Latchkey Kids (Yaldey Mafteah)	Gur	Short
2015 - 2021	Shtisel	Hanina Tonik	Series regular, S2 and S3
2016	Beyond the Mountains and Hills (Me'Ever Laharim Velagvaot)	Evyatar	
2016	Leave of Absence (Shabaton)		3 episodes
2017	Nerd Club: The Movie	Yotam	
2018	Broken Mirrors	Ben	Film
2018	Eilat	Nissan	
2019	Esau	Young Esau	Film
2019	Our Boys	Yochi Har Zahav	Recurring role
2020	The Israeli Boys	Student	Film
2020	Devek		Short
2020–2021	Black Space	Itamar	Series regular
2022	Barren	Naftali	
2023	Sovietzka	Gilad	4 episodes
2024	Victory	Ilan Rechavam	
2024	The Tattooist of Auschwitz	Mordowicz	3 episodes
