= Ksenia Ovsyanick =

British ballet dancer

- Born: September 5, 1989 (age 36); Soviet Union
- Occupation: principal ballet dancer
- Awards: Critics' Circle National Dance Award - Outstanding Classical Performance (2012) Benois de la Danse nomination - Best Female Dancer (2013) Dance Open International Ballet Award (2018) Premio Eccellenza della Danza (2023)
- Career
- Former groups: English National Ballet, Berlin State Ballet

Ksenia Ovsyanick (Russian: Ксения Овсяник; born September 5, 1989) is a Belarusian-born British ballet dancer and international performing artist. She is currently an Associate Guest Artist with the English National Ballet and was a principal dancer with the Berlin State Ballet from 2016 to 2024. She continues to appear as a guest artist with international ballet companies.

== Early life and training ==
Ovsyanick was born in the Soviet Union and grew up in Belarus. She trained at the Belarusian State Ballet College and later continued her studies at the English National Ballet School after receiving a scholarship associated with the Prix de Lausanne.

== Career ==
Ovsyanick joined the English National Ballet in 2008. Early in her career she performed the title role in Giselle and was nominated for the company's Emerging Dancer Award.

In 2012 she created the title role in Firebird by choreographer George Williamson at English National Ballet, for which she received the Critics’ Circle National Dance Award for Outstanding Female Classical Performance.

In 2016 she joined the Berlin State Ballet as a principal dancer. During her time with the company she performed leading roles in classical repertoire including Don Quixote, La Bayadere, Jewels, Sleeping Beauty, and Onegin. She also worked with choreographers including Nacho Duato, Alexander Ekman, Itzik Galili, David Dawson, and Alexei Ratmansky.

After leaving Berlin State Ballet in 2024 she continued performing internationally as a guest artist. In 2026 it was announced that she would return to English National Ballet as an Associate Guest Artist in productions including Romeo and Juliet and Rhythm Riot.

During the COVID-19 pandemic she initiated and edited the online dance project From Berlin with Love, in which dancers performed choreography remotely during lockdown.

== Personal life ==
Ovsyanick married Czech artist Zdenek Konvalina in 2014. Her sister is Israeli actress Alena Yiv.

== Awards ==
- Premio Eccellenza della Danza (2023)
- Dance Open International Award (2018)
- Benois de la Danse nomination - Best Female Dancer (2013)
- Critics’ Circle National Dance Award - Outstanding Female Classical Performance (2012)
