= Tribeca Film Festival Award for Best Actress =

The Tribeca Film Festival Award for Best Actress was one of the annual film award given by the Tribeca Film Festival between 2003 and 2021.

== Winners ==
=== Best Actress in an International Feature Film ===
- 2020 – Shira Haas in Asia
- 2019 – Park Ji-hu in House of Hummingbird
- 2018 – Joy Rieger in Virgins
- 2017 – Marie Leuenberger in The Divine Order
- 2016 – Radhika Apte in Madly (in the segment Clean Shaven)

=== Best Actress in a U.S. Narrative Feature Film ===
- 2020 – Assol Abdulina in Materna
- 2019 – Haley Bennett in Swallow
- 2018 – Alia Shawkat in Duck Butter
- 2017 – Nadia Alexander in Blame
- 2016 – Mackenzie Davis in Always Shine

=== Best Actress in a Narrative Feature Film ===
- 2015 – Hannah Murray in Bridgend
- 2014 – Valeria Bruni Tedeschi in Human Capital
- 2013 – Veerle Baetens in The Broken Circle Breakdown
- 2012 – Rachel Mwanza in War Witch
- 2011 – Carice van Houten in Black Butterflies
- 2010 – Sibel Kekilli in When We Leave
- 2009 – Zoe Kazan in The Exploding Girl
- 2008 – Eileen Walsh in Eden
- 2007 – Marina Hands in Lady Chatterley
- 2006 – Eva Holubová in Holiday Makers
- 2005 – Felicity Huffman in Transamerica
- 2004 – Fernanda Montenegro in The Other Side of the Street
- 2003 – Valeria Bruni Tedeschi in It's Easier for a Camel...

== See also ==
- Tribeca Film Institute
