= Mabul (film) =

- Theatrical release poster
- Directed by: Guy Nattiv
- Written by: Noa Berman-Herzberg; Guy Nattiv
- Produced by: Daniel Baur; Antoine de Clermont-Tonnerre; Ina Fichman; Tami Leon; Elie Meirovitz; Chilik Michaeli; Avraham Pirchi; Oliver Simon
- Starring: Ronit Elkabetz; Michael Moshonov; Tzahi Grad; Yoav Rotman
- Cinematography: Philippe Lavalette
- Edited by: Tali Helter-Shenkar
- Music by: Patrick Watson
- Production companies: EZ Films; K5 Film; United Channel Movies
- Distributed by: K5 International
- Release dates: September 2010 (Haifa); March 10, 2011
- Running time: 100 minutes
- Country: Israel
- Language: Hebrew

Mabul (also known as The Flood) is a 2010 Israeli drama film starring Ronit Elkabetz and directed by Guy Nattiv. It is a feature-length extension of a previous short film by Nattiv.

On July 26, 2010, it was nominated for several Ophir Awards, including Best Film and Best Actress (Elkabetz). The film was shown at the San Francisco Jewish Film Festival in 2011.

== Plot ==
Yoni's Bar Mitzvah approaches, but his family continues to disintegrate as his parents prepare to separate. Things take a turn when Yoni's autistic older brother, Gidi, returns to the family home from the institution where he has spent many years. Gidi challenges the family to reconcile and put an end to their dysfunctional ways in time for Yoni's Bar Mitzvah celebration.

== Cast ==
- Ronit Elkabetz as Miri Roshko
- Michael Moshonov as Tomer Roshko
- Tzahi Grad as Gidi Roshko
- Yoav Rotman as Yoni Roshko
