= Zdenek Konvalina =

Czech multidisciplinary artist

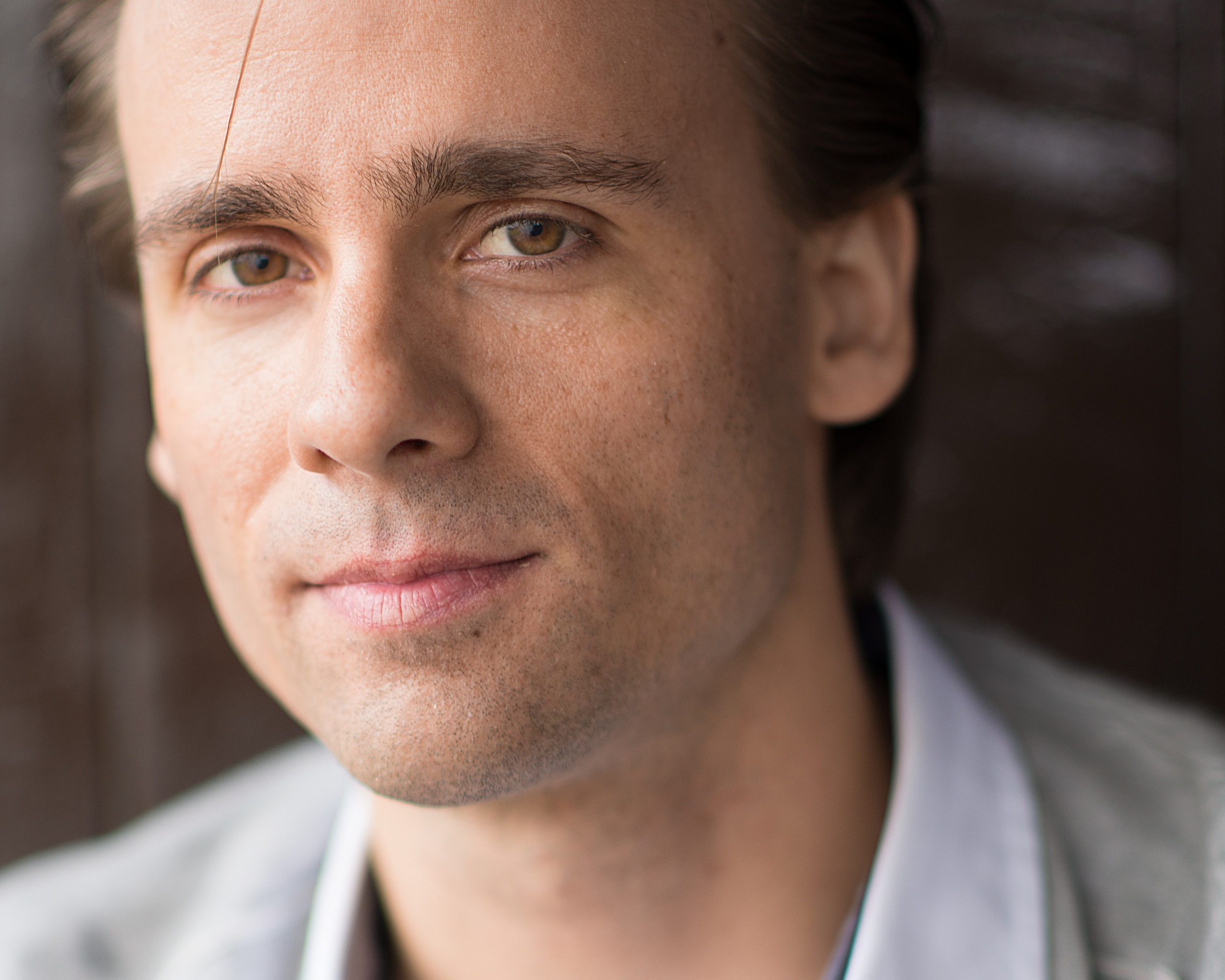

Zdenek Konvalina (born 1979) is a multidisciplinary artist. In later career, he developed abstract expressionist painting practice.

== Personal life ==
Konvalina was born in 1979 in Brno, Czech Republic. He married ballerina Ksenia Ovsyanick in 2014.

== Career ==
After graduating from Brno Conservatory (Bachelor's degree: Fine Arts) in 1997 Zdenek pursued a career of a ballet dancer. He made his U.S. debut in the Fall of 1998 with Brandywine Ballet partnering with Nancy Page as sugar plum fairy and her cavalier in their annual production of The Nutcracker. Zdenek continued on as a principal dancer with Brandywine Ballet until deciding to venture into other artistic endeavors.

In 2001, he joined the Houston Ballet where he danced until 2006. After dancing for five years as a principal dancer with the National Ballet of Canada, in 2011, he joined the English National Ballet English National Ballet in London as lead principal.

Konvalina performed with Dutch National Ballet, Hamburg Ballet, Munich Bayerische Staats Oper, Slovak National Theatre, Ballet Concerto de Puerto Rico, National Ballet of Cuba, Tokyo Ballet, Segerstrom Centre for the Arts Los Angeles, City Centre New York, Alexandrinsky and Mikhailovsky Theatres in St Petersburg, Kennedy Centre for Performing Arts in Washington.

He appeared in many Gala performances such as Gala des Etoiles in Montreal, Gala performance Homage aux Stravinsky, Stars of 21st Century Gala, International Ballet Star Galas in Taipei and Singapore, Diaghilev Festival and Dance Open Festivals in St. Petersburg, Nijinsky Gala in Hamburg and World Ballet Festival in Tokyo in 2006 and 2009.

In 2010 Zdenek co-created a full evening ballet, including a set design, for Maggio Musicale festival in Florence.

In 2014 Zdenek retired as a ballet dancer and transitioned to painting, now living and working in London and Berlin.

== Awards ==
Konvalina's awards include the gold medal at the Helsinki International Ballet Competition in 2001, Rolex Award Toronto 2008 and UK National Dance Award 2012.
