= Tali Shalom Ezer =

Israeli filmmaker, writer and director

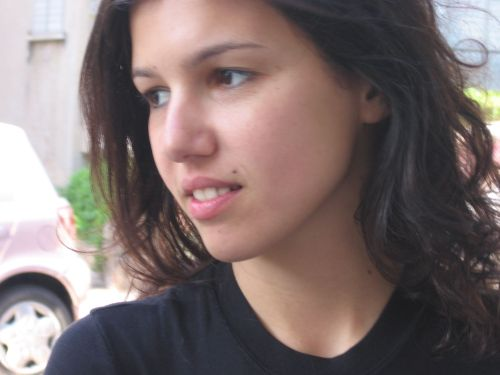
Shalom-Ezer in 2006

Tali Shalom-Ezer (Hebrew: טלי שלום עזר; born 1978) is an Israeli filmmaker, screenwriter, and director. She is best known for her debut feature, Princess (2014) which premiered at the 2015 Sundance Film Festival as part of the World Dramatic Competition.

== Early life and education ==
Shalom-Ezer was born and raised in Kfar Saba, Israel, to an immigrant mother of Ashkenazi Jewish (Romania) descent and an immigrant father of Iraqi Jewish descent. During her school years, Shalom-Ezer became involved in a local theatre group. During her military service in the Israel Defense Forces (IDF), Shalom-Ezer trained and worked as an IDF Psychological Evaluator, performing psychometric tests on young Israelis preparing for enlistment.

Shalom-Ezer's ongoing interest in psychology was greatly influenced by her mother, who worked as a psychiatric nurse, focusing on the use of psychodrama with her patients. All of her films have a psychological dimension to them, and Shalom-Ezer sees there to be a strong connection between Cinema and Psychology.

Shalom-Ezer undertook some initial training in acting at Beit Zvi School of Performing Arts, though soon decided to shift her focus to Directing. She continued her studies at Tel Aviv University, first in Theatre Studies (Directing), and then in Cinema through the Film and Television Department. During her time as a student, she won a 3-year scholarship from the America-Israel Cultural Foundation for her studies in Cinema.

== Career ==
Before her work as a film director, Shalom-Ezer worked as a theatre director's assistant and as a casting director's assistant. She also spent time working as a production manager and as producer for fringe theatre productions and for theatre festivals.

Shalom-Ezer has been a judge of the Official Competition at the Jerusalem Film Festival, for the International Student Film Festival, Tel Aviv, and has worked as a lector for several of the major Israeli film festivals and Israeli film funds. Shalom-Ezer currently teaches in the Film and Television Department at Tel Aviv University focusing on working with actors. She lives with her partner Libby Tishler in Tel Aviv.

== Films ==
- A Summer at Abarbanel (2005), a 60 min documentary was also made during Shalom-Ezer's time as a student and for this film, she won 2nd prize for Best Student Film at Docaviv Documentary Film Festival.
- Living Room (2006), 19 min. Shalom-Ezer made this film during her time as a student. It screened at Cannes Film Festival and Jerusalem International Film Festival, among others.
- Surrogate (2008), 58 min. The film won Best Film at the Israeli International Women's Film Festival in Rehovot, received a Special Mention at FEMINA International Festival for Women's Films Brazil, and was part of the Official selection at Edinburgh International Film Festival among others;
- Princess, (2014), 92 mins. The film won the Awards for Best Feature, Best Actress, Best Cinematography and Best Music at the Jerusalem International Film Festival, 2014. The script for the film won the Highlight Pitch Award at the Berlinale Talent Project Market in 2009, and was subsequently invited to the Script Development Program at the Binger Filmlab 2009–10 in Amsterdam, where Shalom-Ezer and Producer Elad Gavish worked together closely with Australian filmmaker, Jennifer Kent (The Babadook) under the guidance of Molly Marlene Stensgaard, Martin Rabbetts, and Ido Abraham,
- My Days of Mercy (2017) her first English language film and lesbian love story.

== Awards and nominations ==
- Best Feature, Jerusalem Film Festival, 2014 – Princess
- Highlight Pitch Award, Berlinale Talent Project Market, 2009
- Adam Flynt Script Competition – Princess
- Best Feature, International Women's Film Festival In Rehovot, 2009 – Surrogate
- Special Mention at FEMINA International Festival for Women's Films – Surrogate
- 2nd Prize for Best Student Documentary, Docaviv, 2005 – Summer at Abarbanel
- America-Israel Culture Foundation Grant, 2005, 2006, 2007

== See also ==
- List of female film and television directors
- List of lesbian filmmakers
- List of LGBT-related films directed by women
- Women of Israel
- Women in the Israel Defense Forces
- List of Israelis
