= Shira Haas =

Israeli actress (born 1995)

- שירה האס
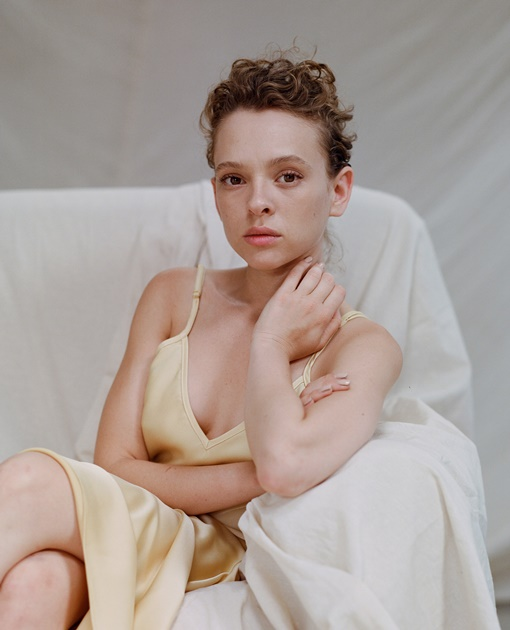
- Haas in 2022
- Born: 11 May 1995 (age 31); Tel Aviv, Israel
- Education: Thelma Yellin High School of the Arts
- Occupation: Actress
- Years active: 2010–present
- Notable work: Shtisel; Unorthodox; Asia; Bodies; Captain America: Brave New World
- Awards: Independent Spirit Award (2021); Tribeca Film Festival Award for Best Actress (2020); 2× Ophir Awards (2018, 2020)

Shira Haas (born 11 May 1995) is an Israeli actress. She first rose to local prominence for her role in the television series Shtisel (2013–2021). Her international breakthrough came with her portrayal of Esther "Esty" Shapiro in the Netflix miniseries Unorthodox (2020), for which she received Golden Globe and Primetime Emmy nominations, becoming the first Israeli actress to be nominated for the latter.

After appearing in theatre productions as a child, she transitioned to film making her debut in Princess (2014). She has since starred in multiple films including A Tale of Love and Darkness (2015) and Asia (2020). She also appeared in the Netflix science fiction television series Bodies (2023) and played Ruth Bat-Seraph in the Marvel Cinematic Universe film Captain America: Brave New World (2025).

== Early life ==
Haas was born in Tel Aviv, Israel, on 11 May 1995, to a Polish Jewish family. Two of her grandparents are Holocaust survivors; her grandfather was imprisoned in the Auschwitz concentration camp in occupied Poland during World War II, whereas her grandmother had immigrated to Israel from Hungary. In Hebrew, her first name literally means the noun "poetry", "singing" or "her song". When she was one year old, her family moved to the city of Hod HaSharon, Israel, where she grew up with her older sister and brother.

At age two, Haas was diagnosed with kidney cancer. Through years of radiation treatment she recovered, but the ordeal damaged her spine and stunted her growth, leading to her diminutive size. On 2 August 2022, her mother Ariela "Leah" Haas died of cancer, after weeks in hospice, at age 61.

She attended the Thelma Yellin High School of Arts in Givatayim, Israel, majoring in theatre, before completing a short period of volunteer service in the Israel Defense Forces' (IDF) theatre unit, despite being medically exempted from mandatory conscription.

== Career ==
=== 2010–2019: Early work and breakthrough ===
At age 14, she began performing in plays at the Tel Aviv's Cameri Theater, such as Ghetto (2010) and Richard III. She made her television debut as the role of Haredi girl Ruchami Weiss in the Israeli drama series Shtisel in 2013. While attending Thelma Yellin, Haas was approached by an Israeli casting director by the name of Esther Kling via Facebook message in 2014. She encouraged Haas to audition for the lead role in the Israeli film Princess (2014). After getting her debut role at the age of 16, Haas was praised by The New York Times for her "truly remarkable lead performance", and was admired by The Hollywood Reporter for fitting the part of a 12-year-old character with her "petite frame and baby-smooth complexion". The role won her the awards for Best Actress at both the Jerusalem Film Festival and the Peace & Love Film Festival, as well as a nomination for Best Leading Actress at the Israeli Ophir Awards.

Haas made her first appearance in an international film when she played the role of young Fania in compatriot Natalie Portman's directorial-debut, A Tale of Love and Darkness (2015). Haas also appeared alongside Jessica Chastain in Niki Caro's The Zookeeper's Wife (2017), which led to her American talk show debut on The Today Show in 2016. Haas auditioned for the role over Skype call. She earned her second Israeli Ophir Award nomination for Best Supporting Actress in Foxtrot (2017), which made the final shortlist for the 90th Academy Award for Best Foreign Language Film.

At the 2018 Israeli Ophir Awards, Haas was nominated for both Best Leading Actress for Broken Mirrors (2018) and Best Supporting Actress for Noble Savage (2018), the latter of which she won. In 2018, she appeared as Leah in Mary Magdalene, written by Helen Edmundson and directed by Garth Davis. She made the Israeli Forbes list of 30 under 30 in February 2019, before appearing alongside Harvey Keitel in the second biblical film in her acting career, Esau (2019).

=== 2020–present: International recognition with Unorthodox ===
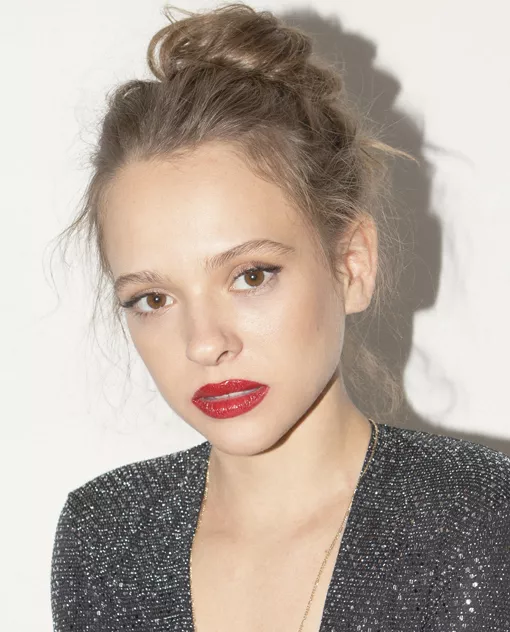
Haas (pictured) in 2022

In March 2020, Haas starred in the German limited Netflix series Unorthodox (2020) as Esther "Esty" Shapiro, a young girl who runs away from her arranged marriage and Ultra-Orthodox community in Williamsburg, Brooklyn, New York City. Filming for the show occurred in Berlin, Germany, with Haas learning the Yiddish language, shaving her head and also completing both piano and singing lessons prepare for the role. Based on the true life story of Deborah Feldman, the series received critical acclaim. Haas also received critical acclaim for her role, with various publications praising her performance. (Note: Various publications include The New York Times, The Guardian, Forbes, and The Washington Post.) At the 72nd Primetime Emmy Awards, Haas was nominated for Best Lead Actress in a Limited Series for this performance, becoming the first Israeli to be nominated for an acting Primetime Emmy Award.

Haas acted alongside Alena Yiv in the role of a daughter who becomes reliant on a wheelchair in the Israeli film Asia (2020), which premiered online at the 2020 Tribeca Film Festival, due to the COVID-19 pandemic. The role earned Haas the award for Best International Actress at the festival. The jury wrote, "Her face is a never-ending landscape in which even the tiniest expression is heartbreaking; she's an incredibly honest and present actress who brings depth to everything she does." Her performance in the film also earned her the award for Best Supporting Actress at the 30th Israeli Ophir Awards. In late April 2020, she joined a virtual ceremony celebrating Israel's 72nd Independence Day, alongside Ben Platt and Josh Malina. Haas was signed to Creative Artists Agency in June 2020.

In 2024, Haas appeared in the titular role of historic drama Ethel. Haas was named to Forbes' 2021 list for North America of 30 Under 30 innovators and entrepreneurs in 20 categories. That same year, Haas starred as Nancy in the musical Opening Night at the Gielgud Theatre in London's West End.

In February 2025, Haas portrayed an iteration of the Israeli superhero Sabra in the Marvel Cinematic Universe (MCU) film Captain America: Brave New World. The inclusion of her character was met with controversy, due to the Gaza–Israel conflict. Her character, Ruth Bat-Seraph, is portrayed as a former Black Widow assassin. The character received polarising views with many arguing that the MCU's iteration of the character was stripped of her comic counterpart's characteristics and that her Israeli identity was largely downplayed. Haas has also stated that she received multiple anti-Semitic threats during this time.

== Personal life ==
As of April 2020, Haas has resided in Tel Aviv, Israel. In 2025, local media outlets reported that Haas ended her four-year relationship with Israeli film director Ido Weisman.

In October 2023, Haas along with hundreds of other actors and entertainment executives from Hollywood, signed an open letter to President Biden calling for support in securing the release of hostages held by Hamas following the group's October 7 attacks against Israel.

== Filmography ==
Key
†	Denotes films that have not yet been released

=== Film ===
Year	Title	Role	Notes
2014	Princess	Adar / Daughter	
2015	A Tale of Love and Darkness	young Fania Mussman / Kira	
2017	Foxtrot	Alma	
2017	The Zookeeper's Wife	Urszula	
2018	Mary Magdalene	Leah	
2018	Noble Savage	Anna	
2019	Broken Mirrors	Ariela	
2019	Esau	Teen Leah	
2020	Asia	Vika	
2025	Captain America: Brave New World	Ruth Bat-Seraph	
2027	The Nightingale †	Rachel de Champlain	Filming
TBA	Triumph of the Will †	TBA	Post-production

=== Television ===
Year	Title	Role	Notes
2013–2021	Shtisel	Ruchama Weiss / Ruchama Tonik	30 episodes
2015–2016	Hazoref	Yosefa "Sofi" Ben-David (young)	Israeli mini-series; 7 episodes
2016	Ikaron HaHachlafa	Salame	Israeli series; 3 episodes
2017	Harmon	Tamar	Israeli series; 8 episodes
2018	HaMenatzeah	Odi	Israeli series; 10 episodes
2020	Unorthodox	Esther "Esty" Shapiro	Netflix mini-series
2023	Bodies	DC Iris Maplewood	Netflix series; 8 episodes
2024–present	Night Therapy	Yasmin	Israeli series; 8 episodes
TBA	The Boys from Brazil †	Anna Koheler	Miniseries

=== Stage ===
Year	Title	Role	Venue
2024	Opening Night	Nancy	Gielgud Theatre

== Awards and nominations ==
Award	Year (Note: Indicates the year of ceremony. Each year is linked to the article about the awards held that year, wherever possible.)	Work(s)	Category	Result	Ref.
Awards of the Israeli Television Academy	2021	Shtisel	Best Lead Actress – Drama Series	Nominated	
Awards of the Israeli Television Academy	2025	Night Therapy	Best Supporting Actress – Drama Series	Won	
Critics' Choice Movie Awards	2021	Unorthodox	Best Actress in a Movie/Miniseries	Nominated	
German Television Awards	2020	Unorthodox	Best Actress	Nominated	
Golden Globe Awards	2021	Unorthodox	Best Actress – Miniseries or Television Film	Nominated	
Golden Nymph Awards	2024	Night Therapy	Jury Special Prize	Won	
Independent Spirit Awards	2021	Unorthodox	Best Female Performance in a New Scripted Series	Won	
Jerusalem Film Festival	2014	Princess	Best Actress	Won	
Ophir Awards (Note: Also referred to the Israeli Film Academy Awards)	2014	Princess	Best Actress	Nominated	
Ophir Awards	2017	Foxtrot	Best Supporting Actress	Nominated	
Ophir Awards	2018	Broken Mirrors	Best Actress	Nominated	
Ophir Awards	2018	Noble Savage	Best Supporting Actress	Won	
Ophir Awards	2020	Asia	Best Supporting Actress	Won	
Peace & Love Film Festival	2015	Princess	Best Actress	Won	
Primetime Emmy Awards	2021	Unorthodox	Outstanding Lead Actress in a Limited Series or Movie	Nominated	
Satellite Awards	2021	Unorthodox	Best Actress – Miniseries or Television Film	Nominated	
Tribeca Film Festival	2020	Asia	Best International Actress	Won	

== See also ==
- List of Israelis
- List of Jewish actors
- List of Jews in the performing arts
