= Noble Savage (film) =

2018 film

- Directed by: Marco Carmel
- Written by: Marco Carmel
- Starring: Alon Aboutboul
- Release date: June 2018 (Cinema South Film Festival)
- Running time: 94 minutes
- Country: Israel
- Language: Hebrew

Noble Savage (Hebrew: פרא אציל) is a 2018 Israeli drama film directed by Marco Carmel. In July 2018, it was one of five films nominated for the Ophir Award for Best Picture.

== Cast ==
- Alon Aboutboul as Yom Tov
- Moris Cohen as Nahshon
- Liat Ekta as Sima
- Shira Haas as Anna
- Ori Pfeffer as Elkayam
