= Naale program =

Naale Elite Academy (Hebrew: נעל״ה) is an international program jointly funded by the Israeli Ministry of Education and the Jewish Agency. It enables Jewish teenagers from the diaspora to study and complete their high school education in Israel for free, and encourages them to immigrate to Israel.

== History ==
The program was run in pilot mode until 2000, after which it was expanded to other countries and took on its current form.

== The program course ==
=== Application ===
A student can apply in the eighth, ninth or 10th grade (starting study age bracket between 13 years 9 months and 16 years 10 months). Potential students and at least one parent then attend a special screening day that entails academic and psychological examinations to ensure that students are suited for the program. The only (non-refundable) fees are a registration fee (before the screening) and an acceptance fee (if accepted into the program), costing $600 each. There are no fees for applicants from the Post-Soviet states.

Academic achievements are not a pivotal requirement, the main acceptance criteria is "social skills and maturity level".

==== Anieres program ====
The Anieres program is part of Naale, the school is located in Nahalal. There is an additional "quantitative thinking" written entrance exam the candidates take, if they fail they can still go to a regular school.

On the top of the Naale program it claims to include "a free university degree in science or engineering" subject to certain conditions, namely, if Anieres students achieve sufficient Bagrut and psychometry scores for the chosen field in science or engineering, in addition to the army Atuda program which is also available for the rest of the Naale schools it has the second option of "full military service followed by studies at the Technion, subject to compliance with the admission requirements".

=== During the study years ===
There are rules prohibiting alcohol, drugs, and any forms of violence. Such are the regulations of the Israeli Ministry of Education, and they are implemented by the administration of Naale in coordination with each boarding school.

=== After graduation ===
If the graduates get sufficient IDF screening score they may have an option (at the army discretion and with the choice of academic tracks tailored to each candidate) to be accepted to the Atuda program and complete a college or university degree partially paid by the army in exchange for signing a contract to serve in the army two or three additional years after completing two years and eight months of obligatory service (female soldiers also sign to extend their obligatory service to the same length as their male counterparts).

Students who choose to make Aliyah are eligible for an absorption basket from the Ministry of Aliyah and Integration, though they will have received some of their rights as a Naale student. They are also eligible for subsidized undergraduate tuition in Israeli universities upon completion of their army service subject to certain conditions.

== Management structure ==
The counselors are not required to have a formal experience in education or any tertiary degree (e.g. they may take the job after having completed the military service and some of the counselors are Naale graduates themselves), but they usually have some experience in informal education and are motivated to help the immigrant adolescents.

A team of psychologists and social workers supervises the immediate group staff and, when deemed necessary, the students may be referred to the team for psychological evaluation and intervention.

== Psychological well-being of Naale students ==
The Naale students, while enrolled in the program, seem to have a lower level of psychological distress comparing to their peers who immigrated with their parents and are living in the community.

Some students benefit from the surrogate relationship reaching the maturity level which they couldn't achieve if living with their parents, while for other students the physical separation from their families may impair their emotional individuation process causing psychological problems in later life.

A regional director for Naale stated: "The downside of this project is that parents and kids are separated, which is hard because it is a young age".

== Naale vs other immigration choices ==
Taking into account known risk factors - the propensity of teenagers to think emotionally rather than rationally so the burden and the responsibility for the life changing decision mainly lies with their parents, being separated from their biological family and potentially becoming emotionally detached from their parents and their siblings, the surrogate environment limitations, the possibility of developing long-term psychological problems and given the lack of psychological research on the long-term impact of the program on its students - the decision to send a child to the Naale program should not be taken lightly.

== Statistics ==
Since the program’s establishment in 1992, as of 2018, over 17,000 teenagers had passed through the program with about 85% staying in Israel (over 90% as of 2019) and 40% of the parents making Aliyah as well and, also as of 2018, there were over 2,000 students studying in Naale Elite Academy schools.

== Naale and Russia-Ukraine war ==
Since the 2022 Russian invasion of Ukraine 350 students from Ukraine were brought to Israel and placed in Naale schools by 2023.

Those Ukrainian refugees who applied for an entry permit to Israel under the Law of Return received it swiftly without further background checks if at least one of their children has taken part in the Naale program.
