= Alena Yiv =

Israeli actress and director

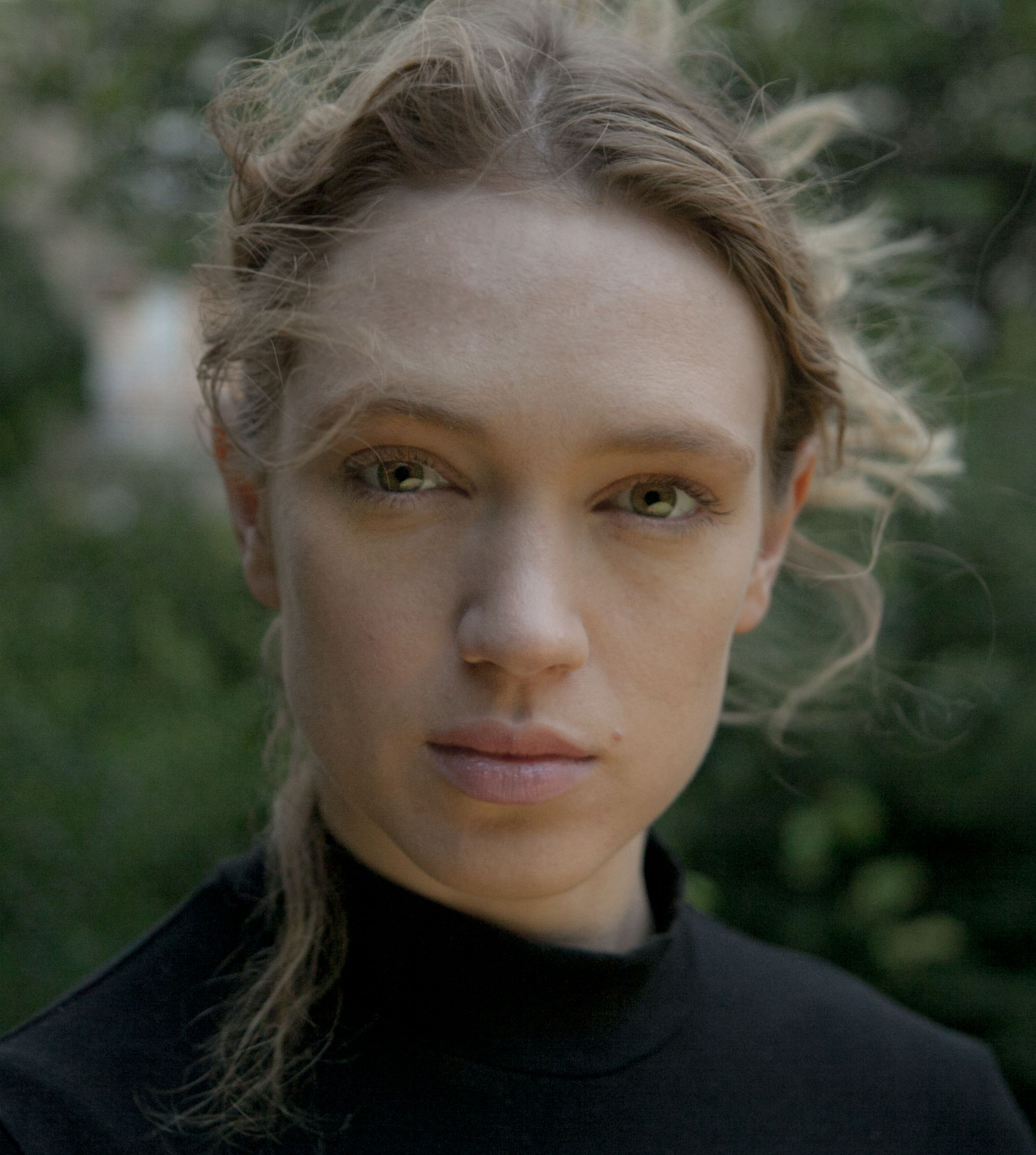
Alena Yiv in 2011

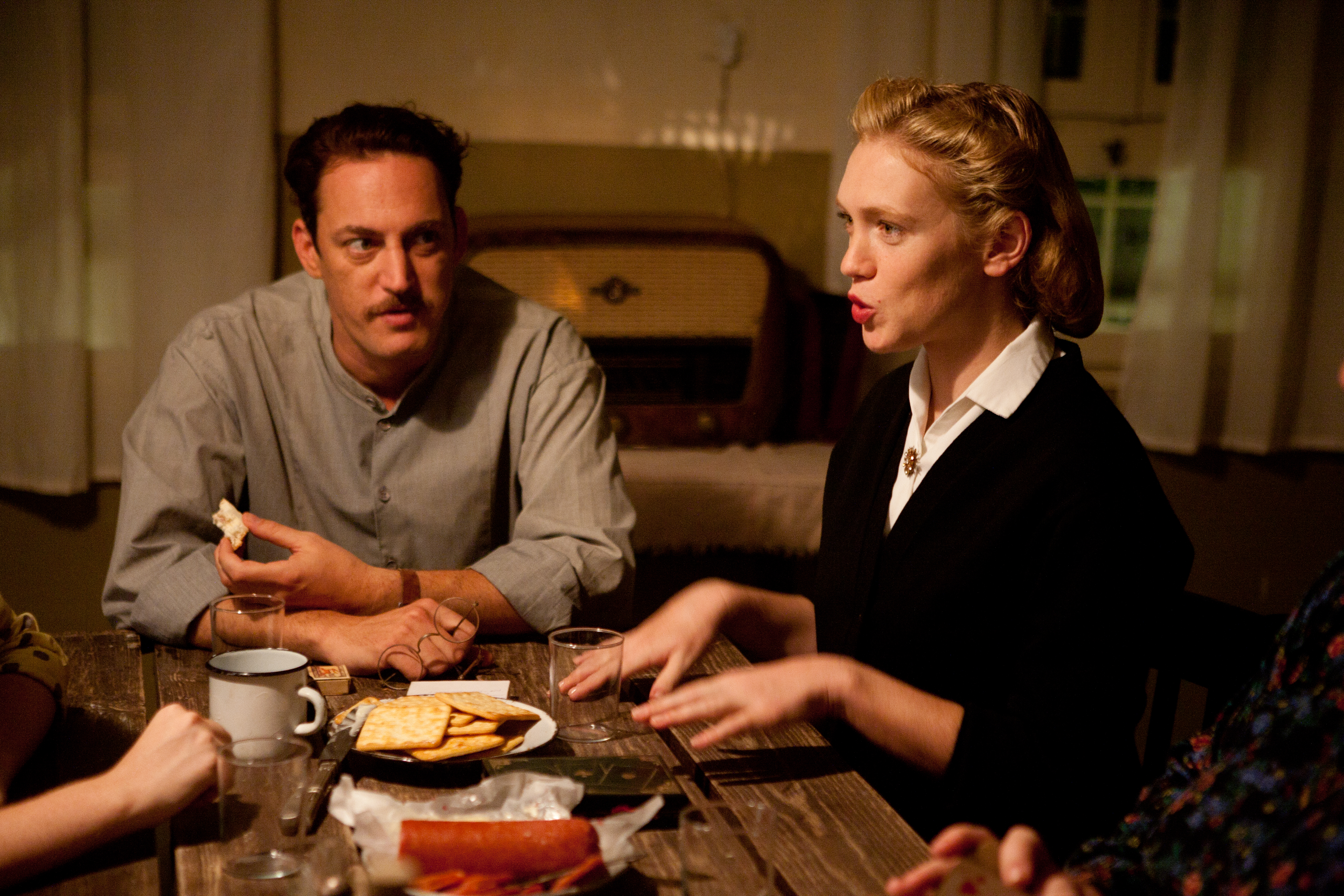
Alena Yiv and Yehezkel Lazarov in the movie "The Fifth Heaven", 2012

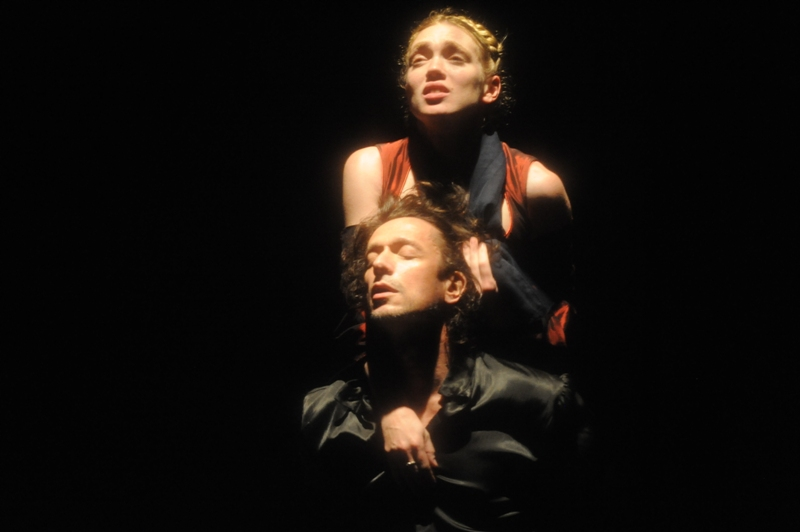
Alena Yiv and Sasha Demidov in Dom Juan, Gesher Theater

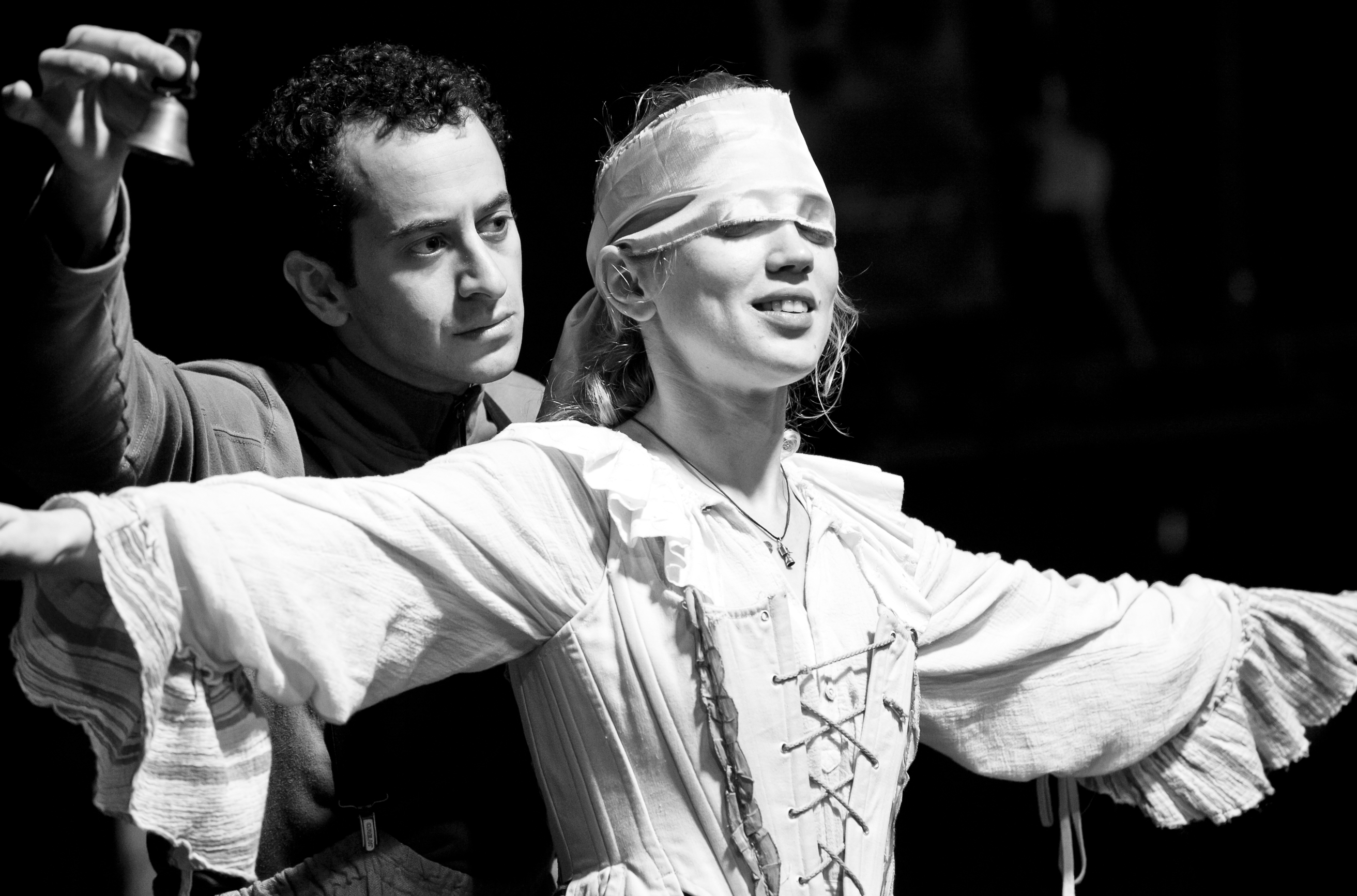
Alena Yiv and Ori Yaniv in Don Juan, Gesher Theater

Alena (Alona) Yiv (Hebrew: אלונה איב, Russian: Алёна Ив; born on November 30, 1979) is an Israeli actress and director.

== Biography ==
Born as Alyona Ovsyanick (Russian: Алёна Овсянник) in Saint Petersburg, Soviet Russia, to a psychologist mother and an economist father. She has two younger sisters, one an Israeli economist and second, Ksenia Ovsyanick, principal ballerina at Berlin State Ballet, who resides in Berlin. At fourteen years old Yiv made Aliyah to Israel with NAALE Program. She first lived in kibbutz Mishmar HaEmek, where she learned Hebrew and afterwards moved to David Raziel youth village, where she graduated high school with specialisation in Mathematics and Music.

She continued studying Mathematics afterwards at the Technion – Israel Institute of Technology. However more and more she developed interest in cinema and movie making, actively attending lectures and seminars, reading and learning about filmmaking. This led to her eventually moving to Jerusalem to attend Hadassah College to study film and television production.

As part of the studies she also took acting classes, leading to starring in short film "Junior" (dir. Yossi Asnafy, 2006), which was nominated for the best Israeli short film in Haifa International Film Festival (2006) and Jerusalem Film festival (2007). Following Hadassah she moved to Tel Aviv to join Film and Television Acting Studio founded and directed by Avi Malka. While working as assistant director and production coordinator, she also attended his acting courses.

In 2010 she starred in the Israeli TV series Blue Natalie (as Yulia) and was nominated for best actress in drama series by Israeli TV Academy for both seasons. After her career progressed with her starring in Dina Zvi-Riklis movie "The Fifth Heaven" that was released in October 2012, TV mini-series "Hazoref" (as Henya, dir. Dror Sabo, 2015), Marina in "Heroine" (2016) and more.

In 2011-2012 Yiv played in Molière's "Don Juan" in Gesher Theater (as Dona Anna, dir. Alexander Morfov)

Always having love for sports, Yiv joined Dima Osmolovsky's Stunt team in 2009. She performed as a stuntwoman in Israeli and international TV and film productions for six years until her first pregnancy.

Along her acting career she directed a number of short films and music videos.

== Personal life ==
She resides in Tel Aviv with her Israeli partner and photographer Nimrod Golan, and their two children.
