= Rudolph Marks =

American dramatist

Rudolph Marks (c. 1867 in Odessa, Russian Empire – 1930), born as Max Radkisson and A.K.A. Rudolph Marks Rodkinson. He was a playwright, songwriter, and comedian. He rivaled Sigmund Mogulesko in Yiddish Theater in New York City in the 1890s, but had a less enduring career.

== Biography ==
Marks arrived in New York aged 19, having spent four years in England after leaving Russia. In New York, he appeared with the Thalia Theatre and the United Hebrew Opera Company. By 1893, he was described as a "well known and clever comedian", and was one of two contenders for the title of "most popular young actor" in a contest run by a New York newspaper. He wrote several plays in Yiddish, including The Bowery Tramp, "the great comedy success" Chaim in America, and The Shop Girl.

By 1893, Marks had begun studying law at University of the city of New York, and was admitted to the bar in 1898. For some years, reports of court cases he appeared in described him as "better known as a writer of Yiddish plays and as an actor of Shakepearean parts in the Bowery theaters than as a lawyer". He died in Manhattan on 6 May 1930.
