= Pieces of a Broken Mirror =

- Gotham episode
- Episode no.: Season 4 Episode 12
- Directed by: Hanelle M. Culpepper
- Written by: Danny Cannon
- Cinematography by: Scott Kevan
- Editing by: Sarah C. Reeves
- Production code: T40.10012
- Original air date: March 1, 2018
- Running time: 43 minutes

Guest appearances
- Peyton List as Ivy Pepper; Chris Perfetti as Cosmo Krank; Caissie Levy as Tiffany Gale; Lacretta as Madame; Brian J. Carter as Coroner; Thomas Lyons as Griffin Krank

Episode chronology
← Previous "Queen Takes Knight"	Next → "A Beautiful Darkness"
- Gotham season 4

"Pieces of a Broken Mirror" is the twelfth episode and midseason premiere of the fourth season and 78th episode overall from the Fox series Gotham. The show is itself based on the characters created by DC Comics set in the Batman mythology. The episode was written by executive producer Danny Cannon and directed by Hanelle M. Culpepper. It was first broadcast on March 1, 2018.

In the episode, Gordon has been on a rough time after the events of the past episode. He investigates Lee's attempted assassination by a man who employed a toy plane charged with a bomb. After he and Fox survive another assassination attempt at his toy workshop, he looks to identify the suspect, who has been secretly employed by one of Lee's trustees. Meanwhile, after being fired by Bruce, Alfred has been living in the Narrows for a time, for which he begins to befriend a friendly waitress in a diner but soon discovers she is living with her abusive boyfriend. Also, Ivy Pepper is reborn into a new physical form.

The episode received mostly positive reviews from critics, who praised Cory Michael Smith's performance, the writing and the great blend of the storylines together.

== Plot ==
Gordon (Ben McKenzie) visits a brothel to look for Bullock, for which he leaves a note to the owner. Meanwhile, a group of drug addicts sneak into an abandoned lab to look for drugs. However, they discover Ivy Pepper (Peyton List) getting herself out of a cocoon-like state in a new physical form. When one of the addicts tries to touch her, she sedates him.

After getting kicked out, Alfred (Sean Pertwee) has been living in the Narrows and fends off thugs who try to rob him with the help of Gordon. Lee (Morena Baccarin) meets with the Narrows citizens to discuss their business when a man orchestrates a toy plane equipped with an explosive and sends it after her. Grundy (Drew Powell) throws it out of a window and it explodes, causing a fire in the building. Alfred and Gordon help everyone escape from the building while Lee, Nygma (Cory Michael Smith) and Grundy escape. Grundy has flashes of his past life and proclaims himself again as Butch Gilzean.

Alfred wins the respect of the thugs who tried to assault him and hailed as a hero in a local diner. Gordon and Fox (Chris Chalk) interrogate toy maker Cosmo Krank (Chris Perfetti), whose dad manages the workshop. His dad Griffin (Thomas Lyons) gets a toy to shoot bullets and also distracts them with an explosive before escaping. Ivy sneaks into a house and steals clothes and food but watches a commercial for Sirens, for which she recognizes Selina (Camren Bicondova) and Barbara (Erin Richards). She goes to the Sirens where she's kicked out for her behavior. Selina also confronts Bruce (David Mazouz) for his reckless behavior. She recognizes Ivy and follows her to her apartment where they make an alliance.

Gordon is called to investigate a murder, a waitress called Tiffany (Caissie Levy) whom Alfred befriended. She showed signs of a beating and Alfred is the prime suspect after confronting her boyfriend who abused her. However, Alfred escapes before getting arrested. Alfred goes after the boyfriend in a bar and beats him but is then subdued by his friends just when Bullock (Donal Logue) saves him and gets the boyfriend arrested. Gordon continues his investigation into saving the target and discovers Lee is the target.

Nygma is confronted by Krank, who claims that he hired him to kill Lee using the "Riddler" name, something of which Nygma has no memory of. Gordon arrives and when Krank tries to attack, Gordon shoots him, killing him. When questioned by Gordon, Nygma does not mention his involvement while he sees his Riddler persona in a mirror. Gordon visits Bullock, who now works in the bar. He tries to get him back on the GCPD but he refuses to go back.

== Production ==
=== Development ===
In February 2018, it was announced that the twelfth episode of the season would be titled "Pieces of a Broken Mirror" and was to be written by executive producer Danny Cannon and directed by Hanelle M. Culpepper.

=== Casting ===
In October 2017, Peyton List was cast as a new iteration of Ivy Pepper. According to Bryan Wynbrandt, "The change was all based on the idea that she's continuing to evolve to become more of the Ivy from the comic books and what we really enjoyed. In this third evolution you're going to see a really self possessed, really scary and driven version of the Ivy character, who is intent on kind of making the world in the image she sees it should be, which is the green world. The world where the plants rule and people are an after thought."

Robin Lord Taylor, Crystal Reed, and Alexander Siddig don't appear in the episode as their respective characters. In March 2018, it was announced that the guest cast for the episode would include Peyton List as Ivy Pepper, Chris Perfetti as Cosmo Krank, Brian J. Carter as Coroner, Caissie Levy as Tiffany Gale, and Lacretta as Madame.

== Reception ==
=== Viewers ===
The episode was watched by 2.57 million viewers with a 0.8/3 share among adults aged 18 to 49. This was a slight increase in viewership from the previous episode, which was watched by 2.53 million viewers with a 0.8/3 in the 18-49 demographics. With these ratings, Gotham ranked first for Fox, beating Showtime at the Apollo, fourth on its timeslot, and twelfth for the night, behind S.W.A.T., Superstore, Will & Grace, How to Get Away with Murder, Chicago Fire, Life in Pieces, Scandal, Mom, Grey's Anatomy, Young Sheldon, and The Big Bang Theory.

With DVR factored in, the episode was viewed by 4.09 million viewers.

=== Critical reviews ===
Professional ratings
Review scores
Source	Rating
IGN	7.1
TV Fanatic	4.5/5.0 stars
TV Overmind	3.5/5.0 stars

"A Dark Knight: Pieces of a Broken Mirror" received mostly positive reviews from critics. Matt Fowler of IGN gave the episode a "good" 7.1 out of 10 and wrote in his verdict, "While Gotham hasn't been away all that long, 'Pieces of a Broken Mirror' still felt like an underwhelming adventure for a return episode. It was also very busy and semi-scattered, juggling a Jim/Lee story, a new Ivy transformation, and a sort of off-putting Alfred arc. The best part was Edward realizing that he himself had tried to kill Lee (oh, and the Siren's Club commercial - duh)."

Kyle Fowle of The A.V. Club gave the episode an "A" rating and wrote "I'll admit to being hesitant heading into this week's spring premiere. After all, the winter finale aired all the way back in the beginning of December, and that kind of lengthy break had me questioning whether the show making its return would be as good as I remembered. Perhaps the first 11 episodes worked only as a contained arc, and the show would struggle to keep that momentum going. Luckily, 'A Dark Knight: Pieces Of A Broken Mirror' is a strong premiere, one that follows through on the storylines from last fall in interesting ways while also pushing the story, and the characters, in a new direction."

Nick Hogan of TV Overmind gave the episode a 4.5 star rating out of 5, writing "Gotham has plenty of compelling elements in the back half of this season, but it desperately needs a few course corrections. But, Gotham is at its absolute best when it steps on the gas, so the upcoming villain team up has me hopeful as ever that the show will erase some of the lagging bits in favor of some crazy action."

Lisa Babick of TV Fanatic gave the series a 4.5 star rating out of 5, writing "A number of stories unfolded on Gotham, as we caught up with almost everyone including someone we haven't seen in a long, long time. Some of it made sense, some of it not, but considering how much was actually unpacked, Gotham did a good job of not making the hour a cramped mess." Marc Buxton of Den of Geek gave wrote, "As with the rest of the developing dynamics in this episode, I hope Gotham chooses the slow burn rather than the immediate plot twist with this one. There was a measuredness to this episode in general that really worked. I'd like to see it continue."
