= Broken Mirrors =

2019 Israeli drama film

- Film poster
- Directed by: Imri Matalon, Aviad Givon
- Written by: Imri Matalon, Aviad Givon
- Produced by: Liora Landau, Ronit Reichman
- Starring: Shira Haas; Ariela
- Cinematography: Daniel Miler
- Edited by: Ronit Porat
- Music by: Asher Goldshmidt
- Distributed by: United Films
- Release dates: April 2018 (Rome); 28 March 2019 (Israel); 22 September 2020 (US)
- Running time: 104 minutes
- Country: Israel
- Language: Hebrew

Broken Mirrors (Hebrew: מראות שבורות, romanized: Marot Shvurotl) is a 2019 Israeli drama film written and directed by Imri Matalon and Aviad Givon and starring Shira Haas. The film had its world premiere at the 2018 Rome Film Festival as part of the competition at the 18th edition of Alice in the City section.

Broken Mirrors was nominated for three Ophir Awards (Best Screenplay, Lead Actress for Shira Haas, and Casting), and won the Jury Prize at the 2019 SCHLINGEL International Film Festival. The film is distributed in Israel by United King Films and internationally by Wazabi Films.

== Plot ==
The film depicts the relationship between Giora (Yiftach Klein) and his daughter, Ariela (Shira Haas). Giora, an officer with the rank of Lieutenant Colonel, is a strict father who punishes his daughter for every boundary crossing. Their relationship even borders on sexual abuse. One day, Ariela causes a car accident due to inexperience, and Giora refuses to punish her. Ariela sets out on a journey to punish herself on as large a scale as possible and, along the way, discovers a concealed event from her father's military past, which serves as the cause of his behavior.

== Cast ==
- Shira Haas as Ariela
- Yiftach Klein as Giora
- Renana Raz as Nava
- Yoav Rotman as Ben
- Liora Rivlin
