= Princess (2014 film) =

2014 Israeli drama film

- Film poster
- Directed by: Tali Shalom Ezer
- Written by: Tali Shalom Ezer
- Produced by: Leon Edery; Moshe Edery; Elad Gavish
- Starring: Shira Haas; Ori Pfeffer; Keren Mor; Adar Zohar-Hanetz
- Cinematography: Radek Ladczuk
- Edited by: Neta Dvorkis
- Music by: Ishai Adar
- Production companies: Maker Films; United King Films
- Release dates: July 14, 2014 (Jerusalem Film Festival); January 23, 2015 (Sundance)
- Running time: 92 minutes
- Country: Israel
- Language: Hebrew

Princess is a 2014 Israeli drama film directed and written by Tali Shalom Ezer. It is Ezer's first feature film. Shira Haas stars as Adar, a 12-year-old girl whose close relationship with her mother's boyfriend becomes sexually abusive. Princess premiered at the 2014 Jerusalem Film Festival.

== Production ==
Films that inspired Ezer in the making of the film include Cría Cuervos and Persona. Zohar-Hanetz had never acted prior to his role in the film, which he took after Tali Shalom-Ezer passed him in the street and insisted he take it. The film received funding from the Rabinovich Foundation in Israel.

== Reception ==
"Artful cinematography and subtle and sensitive performances from the cast [...] help make the case for this emotionally complex drama as one of the best films of the festival", said Salt Lake Magazine in a review of the film following its Sundance premiere.

== Accolades ==
The film shared the Haggiag Award for Best Israeli Feature at the 2014 Jerusalem Film Festival. Haas won Best Israeli Actress at the festival for her role in the film.

== Cast ==
- Shira Haas as Adar
- Keren Mor as Alma
- Ori Pfeffer as Michael
- Adar Zohar Hanetz as Alan
