= Gidi Avivi =

Israeli film producer

- גידי אביבי
- Born: 1961 (age 64–65)
- Occupation: film producer

Gidi Avivi (Hebrew: גידי אביבי; born 1961) is an Israeli film producer, the founder of Vice Versa Films.

== Education and early career ==
Avivi holds a Master's degree in Cinema Studies from New York University and a Bachelor of Fine Arts degree in Film and Television from Tel Aviv University. Avivi was the Head of the Music Department and a music programmer at the IDF radio station. Concurrently, Avivi was the popular music critic for the weekly magazine Ha'ir from 1983 to 1987 and the daily newspaper Haaretz from 1994 to 2006.

== Film and TV Career ==
Between 1994 and 1998 Avivi created (with Yoav Kutner, Ami Amir, Arik Bernstein and Gabriel Bibliowicz) a comprehensive 12-part documentary series about the history of Israeli rock music, “Sof Onat Hatapuzim” ("End of the Orange Season"). In 2006 Avivi produced two documentary films: Bekummernis (with Ido Sela) and The Cahana Sisters (with Amir Harel and Gilad Melzer). In 2008 Avivi produced (with Yael Biron and Dror Nahum) a documentary about Ehud Banai and The Refugees - On The Move. In 2011 Avivi founded Vice Versa Films, a production house for feature films, short films and TV series.

== Film festivals ==
Since 2016 Avivi is the Artistic Consultant of Solidarity International Human Rights Film Festival, Tel Aviv. The fourth edition of Solidarity Festival took place in April 2016 at the Tel Aviv Cinematheque.

The fifth edition of the festival took place in May 2017. The opening night film was "The Unknown Girl" directed by the Dardenne Brothers . The lineup included documentaries, including "Speed Sisters" and narrative films including "Junction 48".

In 2009, Avivi, with Micky Laron, founded EPOS, an annual event based at Tel Aviv Museum of Art. Avivi was the Festival Director till 2015. In its inaugural year, the festival guests were Ben Lewis, Sheila Hayman and Rene Letzgus. In 2010 EPOS 2 guests were Percy Adlon, Galina Eevtushenko, Lionel Guedj, Yony Leyser, Tom Magill, Sam McClean, Sergey Ovcharov, Tony Palmer, Viktoria Petranyi, Kathie Russo, Helma Sanders-Brahms, and Lucy Walker. EPOS 3 took place in 2012, and some of its films were also shown in Jerusalem, Haifa, and Beit She'an. The festival included a musical tribute to Dave Brubeck by his son, Darius Brubeck, after a screening of a documentary film by Clint Eastwood about the great jazz pianist. Among the festival's guests were Arantxa Aguirre, John Bridcut, Kevin Hood, Lech Majewski, Agnes Sos, Iwan Schumacher, Philipp Stölzl and Wiktoria Szymanska. EPOS 4 took place in 2013, with additional screenings of its films in various venues in Israel. The opening film of the festival was 'Yossi Banai – A Farewell Album', In addition to the film screenings, the festival hosted cultural and musical events. "Imagination at Work", a new exhibition by Harun Farocki, who was the festival's guest, opened at Tel Aviv Museum of Art during the festival. The premiere of "The Composer's Cut", a new concert of Jonathan Bar Giora, closed EPOS 4. EPOS 5, a 10-day extended edition of the festival, took place in 2014. The opening night film was "Mafriah ha-yonim" ("Farewell Baghdad), directed by Nissim Dayan.

== Filmography ==
2017

- Ron Arad - Not Without White Gloves. Director: Avida Livny; a documentary that focuses on a year in the life of Ron Arad, the world-renowned artist, industrial designer, and architect, as he develops, creates, and exhibits his installations and art works in Jerusalem, Venice, Groningen, London, Holon and Tel Aviv. The premiere of the film took place at Docaviv – Tel Aviv International Documentary Film Festival.
- A Night With No Dawn. Director: Sara Bozakov; a 21-minute short narrative film about a night in the life of five asylum seekers from Sudan, who are on their way to be imprisoned in the Holot Detention facility near the Israel-Egypt border. The premiere took place at the Tel Aviv International Student Film Festival, and the film was given the "Best Film" award in the Israeli Competition.

2016

- Freedom Runners (Original title: Ratsim Lahofesh). Director: David Wachsmann; a 50-minute documentary about a high school teacher that founds a running team for his students, African refugees and asylum seekers, who live in south Tel Aviv. The international premiere of the film took place at Woodstock Film Festival.
- The Ambassador's Wife (Original title: Eshet Hashagrir). Director: Dina Zvi-Riklis; a 40-minute drama based on a screenplay and story by Alma Ganihar, starring Ester Rada as the wife of an Eritrean Ambassador who must flee her country and find refuge in south Tel Aviv. With Yehezkel Lazarov. The Israeli premiere screening of the film took place at Haifa Film Festival.
- Jihad Now (Original title: Jihad Akhshav). Directors: Anna Somershaf and Henrique Cymerman; a 4-hour series presented by Henrique Cymerman about Global Jihad, from the formation of al-Qaeda to the European migrant crisis and the fight against ISIS. The series was nominated for the Israel Filmmakers Documentary Forum award.

2014

- Never Turn Your Back on Sparks (Original title: Leolam Beikvot Sparks). Director: Pini Schatz; a documentary comedy about fans of the "coolest underrated rock band in the world": Sparks.
- East Jerusalem/West Jerusalem (Hebrew title: Mizrah Yerushalayim / Maarav Yerushalayim). Directors: Henrique Cymerman and Erez Miller; an award-winning feature-length documentary about a David Broza project that was recorded during 8 days and nights in a Palestinian studio in Sheikh Jarrah with a band consisting of Jewish and Arab musicians. With Steve Earle and Mira Awad. The film was acquired for world distribution by Film Movement and can be seen worldwide on Netflix.

2013

- Not Your Life (Original title: Lo Ha-Hayim Shelakh; Working title: Gora). Director: Tal Shefi; a documentary that focuses on life choices and their meaning for the director and her daughter, a half-Nepalese-half Israeli girl, who grows up in Goa.

2012

- Chicken Soup with Knives (Original title: Merak Of Im Sakinim; Working title: This is Not a Holocaust Film). Director: Leora Eisenstein; a documentary about the filmmaker's investigative journey with her sister to Lviv, her family's hometown before World War II.

2011

- Looking for Moshe Guez (Original title: Le'an Ne'elam Moshe Guez). Director: Avida Livny; a documentary about the filmmaker's search for the Israeli director Moshe Guez and his rarely seen feature film, The Angel was a Devil.
- Running Movie (Original title: Seret Ratz). Director: Omer Peled; a documentary about the Israeli long-distance runner Seteng Ayele (AKA Haile Satayin), the oldest marathon runner in the 2008 Summer Olympic in Beijing and his efforts to compete at the age of 55, in the 2012 Summer Olympics in London.

2008

- On the Move (Original title: Hayav Lazuz). Director: Avida Livny; a film about courage, friendship and rock and roll, about Ehud Banai and Yossi Elephant, about the Israeli rock band "The Refugees", and especially about the passion for doing the right thing.

2006

- The Cahana Sisters (Original title: Haahayot Cahana). Director: Gilad Melzer; a group portrait and dramatic life journey of four sisters who had survived the death camps together during the Holocaust.
- Bekummernis. Director: Ido Sela; a personal documentary about the director's visit to kibbutz Kfar HaNassi - a magical childhood landscape that turns into a scene of crime.

1998

- End of the Orange Season (Original title: Sof Onat Hatapuzim); an in-depth 12-part documentary series that explores the story of Israeli rock music from the 1960s to the 1990s.
