= List of music festivals in Israel =

Below is a list of major music festivals in Israel:

== Multidisciplinary ==
- Israeli Festival

== Music ==
=== Classical ===
- Abu Ghosh Music Festival - vocal music

=== Folk ===
- Jerusalem International Oud Festival
- Safed Klezmer Festival

=== Jazz ===
- Red Sea Jazz Festival
- Tel Aviv Jazz Festival

=== Pop rock ===
- Ein Gev Music Festival - Hebrew choirs and groups
- InDnegev - Israeli "indie" rock music
