= Guilhad Emilio Schenker =

Israeli filmmaker and television producer

Guilhad Emilio Schenker (Hebrew: גלעד אמיליו שנקר; born 2 October 1980) is a Venezuelan-born Israeli filmmaker, producer, and the co-founder and CEO of international entertainment studio SIPUR.

== Career ==
Since 1994, Schenker has been working in various roles in the Israeli entertainment industry. During his mandatory IDF military service, he served as a producer for the IDF Radio Station Galei Zahal and won the Producer of the Year Award in 2000. After completing his service, he pursued to different roles across Keshet Media Group, Reshet and Channel 13 News.

Schenker later returned to Galei Zahal and acted as the IDF radio's chief creative officer for six more years until 2013. Between 2014 and 2018, he served as the senior vice president at the Zappa Group, a media and music company. In 2018 he was appointed as the CEO of Tadmor Entertainment. He was the artistic director of the Tel Aviv Jazz Festival.

He achieved both his bachelor's and master's degrees from the Steve Tisch School of Film and Television at Tel Aviv University. He is a Berlinale Talents graduate of the Berlin International Film Festival and was a scholar at the German bursary program of the Nordrhein-Westfalen's government.

Between 2013 and 2018, Schenker hosted the television show Living in a Movie, which was broadcast on the Israeli Educational Television Network. The program comprises 170 interviews with prominent Israeli filmmakers. He lectured at the Herzliya Interdisciplinary Center and the Rimon School of Jazz and Contemporary Music.

In 2019, Schenker joined Israeli production company Tadmor Entertainment as the company CEO. Under his leadership, Tadmor Entertainment secured a first-look deal with Amazon's MGM Studios and rebranded as SIPUR.

== Filmography ==
During his academic studies, Schenker directed three 25-minute short films: Shum, The Rebels and Shats - all of which participated in film festivals around the world.

Schenker's final project at Tel Aviv University was a 28-minute short film called Lavan which was produced by the Rabinovich Foundation. The film was inspired by a form of sensory deprivation known as White torture. It tells the story of a prisoner who is incarcerated naked in a plain white room with a blank backdrop and only fed white food in order to drive him insane. It starred Razia Israeli, Sigal Rosh and Tomer Ben David and was shortlisted at the Oscars’ short film category. The movie was directed by Schenker and co-written by him, alongside Yossi Meiri. Meiri also acted as the film's DOP and was awarded the best cinematography prize at the ÉCU The European Independent Film Festival in Paris. Lavan won 12 awards and was acquired for television broadcast in ten countries.

In 2017, Schenker directed his first feature film, Madam Yankelova's Fine Literature Club, which was also co-written by Meiri. It starred Keren Mor, Hana Laszlo, Ania Bukstein, Yiftach Klein and Lea Koenig - in the titular role as Madam Yankelova. The film was nominated for six Ophir Awards and won two: Best Costume Design and Best Makeup. It participated in film festivals across the world and was sold to HBO Europe.
