= Ariel Bronz =

Ukrainian-born playwright

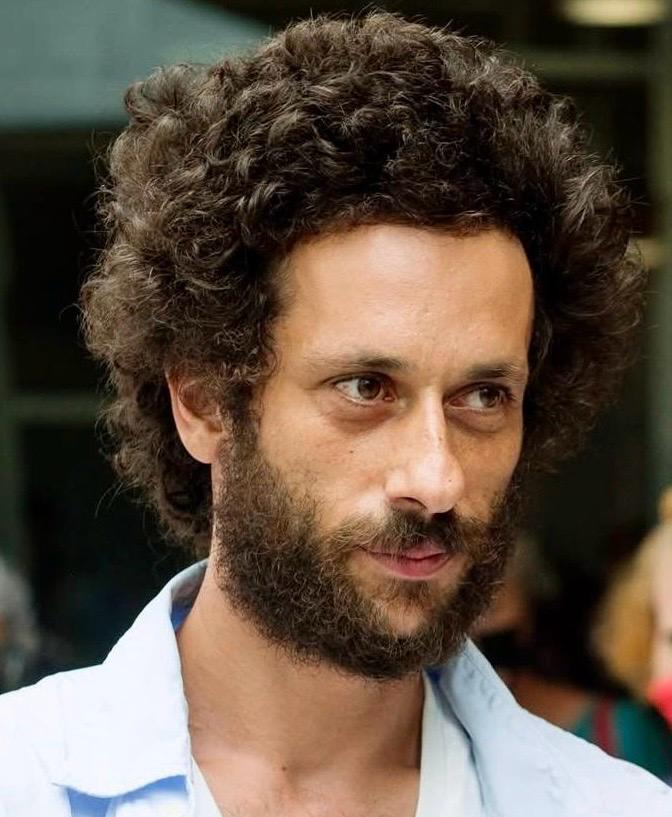
- Occupations: Director, artist, actor
- Years active: 2011 - present
- Website: https://www.arielbronz.com/about

Ariel Bronz is a theatre creator, performance artist, poet, playwright, actor, and activist born in Ukraine, living in Tel Aviv.

He is the author of more than 40 stage and site specific performances and is a recipient of the 2018 Rosenblum Prize for Performing Arts, despite the objections of the Israeli Minister of Culture.

His wide range of works quickly gained him public and critical acclaim, making him one of the most controversial artists in Israel today. These performances are known to immediately make waves, with some reaching cult status. His plays have been presented in various theaters in Israel and around the world.

Since 2015, he has been the house director of Clipa Theatre and a theatre instructor at Nissan Nativ Acting Studio.

== Works ==
In his work, Bronz tackles complex social-political topics and issues that tend to be repressed in society. His targets of criticism vary from the Israeli occupation of Palestinian lands to its inevitable results: militarism, violence, conservatism, and racism.

He exploits elements from pop culture, trash, mainstream media, and theatre to make his harsh message possible to swallow. Abounding with images, symbols, taboos, and cliches, his art creates a synthesis between reality being an absurd scenario and the most exaggerated fiction as a possible and even probable reality.

Bronz's works are characterized by a constant examination of boundaries: he gleefully crosses the boundaries of good taste and uses artistic traps and provocations to shake the audience out of its apathy.

== Controversies ==
=== The Flag ===
In 2016, Bronz was invited by Haaretz to perform at the Tel Aviv Museum as part of his show "Love the Juice" at the "Israel Conference for Culture," both addressing freedom of speech. The audience, who didn't understand the satirical nature of the show, became angry—disrupting and trying to cut short the performance. Trying to control the turmoil, the organizers and security stepped in, attempting to stop the show by turning off the lights and sound and removing the set. Bronz refused to stop the performance before its proper ending, and at the last moment, understanding that the organizers who had invited him and the raging audience would not let him finish his performance, he grabbed the national flag (part of the set, appeared white on camera) and stuck it in his bottom. The action infuriated the audience, and Bronz was escorted out by security.

This act made headlines all over the world, led to harsh comments from right-wing figures, and resulted in threats to his and his family's lives. He received a police complaint filed by the Culture Minister's office and was accused of harming national symbols, public indecency, and disturbance of public order. For years following the incident, Bronz was isolated from the local art scene and was treated as persona non grata. In his interrogation, Bronz claimed that the move was improvised, inspired by a Russian saying. In May 2020, the case was closed.

=== Locked ===
Another performative act that made waves in the media and Israeli discourse is Bronz's "Locked" series. Between 2016 and 2020, on every Holocaust Memorial Day, he would chain himself around the neck and hang himself from different national memorial monuments, in protest against the Israeli government ignoring Holocaust survivors' rights and occupying Palestinian lands. This series of performances draws a straight line between two seemingly unrelated topics: the last Holocaust survivors being neglected in Israel and Palestinians being persecuted in their own land.

Each one of these acts led to him being interrogated and arrested, as well as receiving death threats. He was labeled by the Minister of Culture as a "symbol of slander" after receiving the Rosenblum Prize for his artistic practice from the Tel Aviv mayor in 2018.

== Artistic Output ==
Performance
Year	Name	Place	Role
2025	Cafeteria (Cheder Ochel)	Ta Tarbut Da Vinci TLV	Creator, writer, performer
2025	Locked - a documentary musica	Habait Theatre	Writer, director
2025	House Manager (Av Bait)	Habait Theatre	Writer, director, performer
2024	Dirt	Clipa Theatre	Director
2024	Where's the Money?	Hahanut Theatre	Creator, performer
2024	Black Snow	Clipa Theatre	Director
2023-2024	Beauty	Tel Aviv Museum	Writer
2023	What Do You Know (Ma at mevina)	Clipa Theatre	Creator, director, performer
2023	Kunts	Gesher Theatre	Writer, director
2023	Hey I Just Rapped a Girl	A-Genre Festival, Tmuna Theatre	Creator, performe
2022	Dieדי	Clipa Theatre	Creator, writer, director
2022	Guilty Pleasure	Home Festival, Frankfurt History Museum	Writer, director
2022	The Stars Fooled Me - a tribute show to Bialik	Tel Aviv Culture Center	Writer, performer
2021-2023	I Came, I Saw	Tel Aviv Museum	Creator, writer, co-director
2021	Dig It	Contempo Festival, Lithuania	Creator, performer
2021	Interrogations	Site specific	Creator, performer
2020	The Venue will Shut (performativ act)	Habima Theatre; Cameri Theatre; Beit Lessin Theatre; Gesher Theatre; The Israeli Opera; Clipa Theatre; Tmuna Theatre; Tzavta Theatre	Creator, performer
2020	Frogs	Clipa Theater	Creator, performer
2020	G.U.IL.T	Site specific	Creator, performer
2020	Locked - a documentary musical	Nissan Nativ Acting School, performed by 3rd year students.	Creator, director
2020	Culture	Habima Square	Creator
2020	Locking 5 (performative act)	Yad Vashem Museum	Creator, performer
2019	View Field	Israel Festival	Co-director, writer
2019	Underworld	Short Theater Festival	Writer
2019	Locking 4 (performative act)	Habima Square	Creator, performer
2018-2020	Midsummer Night's Dream IN SPACE	Clipa Theatre	Director, creator
2018-2019	Me2much	Diver Festivel, Clipa Theatre	Creator, performer
2018	The Stranger	Be'er Sheva Fringe Festival, The Negev Museum of Art	Co-creator, performer
2018	All That Works	Clipa Theatre	Co-creator, performer
2018	Mature Audiences	Clipa Theatre	Creator, writer, performer
2018	Locking 3 (performative act)	Holocaust memorial monument, Rabin Square	Creator, performer
2017-2018	Someone's Home	Bialik House Museum	Co-director
2017	Locking 2 (performative act)	The Knesset Lamp Monument	Creator, performer
2016	Culture in the Periphery	Tel Aviv-Yafo City Museum	Creator, writer, performer
2016	Locking 1 (performative act)	Office of the Foundation for Welfare of Holocaust Victims	Creator, performer
2015-2017	LOVE the JUICE	Clipa Theatre	Creator, writer, performer
2015-2016	Facility 27	Tel Aviv-Yafo City Museum	Co-creator, writer, performer
2014–present	Who Wants to Ride a Camel ?	Tour around the country; Germany, Brazil, Italy, Russia	Creator, writer, performer
2014	Hate Arte	Loving Art Festival, Gvirol Culture and Art Center,	Creator, performe
2014	I am Daniil Kharms	Habait Theatre	Writer
2013-2015	Pits	Tmuna Theatre; Habait Theatre; Stanislavski Theatre (Saint Petersburg)	Writer, co-director
2013-2015	Pookland	Habait Theatre; Tzavta Theatre	Writer, performer
2012	Family Dinner	Acer Festival	Writer
2011-2014	Resident Haimovitch	Tzavta Theatre;Tmuna Theatre; Haifa Theatre, Be’er Sheave Theatre; The Citizen Here Festival; Victoria Festival; Edmonton Fringe Theatre Festiva	Writer, performer

Acting
Year	English title	Original title	Type	Role
2025	Yes	כן	Film by Nadav Lapid	Y
2025	The Sand	החול	Short film by Ayal Roe and Shahar Deke	Elisha
2025	Because of the Language Barrier	מפאת זרות השפה	Short film by Tamar Peled	Yigal
2025	Souls	נשמות	Play by Itay Tiran, Based on a book by Roy Chen, Gesher Theatre	Grischa, Getz, Gedalya, Jemol
2016	FOREVER/NEVER	FOREVER/NEVER	Play by Idit Herman, UNIDRAM Festival (Potsdam)	
2016	The Walk to the Gallows of Clown X	עלייתו לגרדום של ליצן X	Play by Eldad Fribs, Tel Aviv-Yafo City Museum	Guest performance
2014	The Kindergarten Teacher	הגננת	Film by Nadav Lapid	
2014	Shahar Abutbul	שחר אבוטבול	Play by Or Nadav Argov, Tmuna Theatre	Shahar Abutbul
2014	Humor	הומור	Short film by Tal Zagreba	
2012-2013	Humpty Dumpty	המפטי דמפטי	Play by Dina Blich, Tmuna Theatre, Patneka Theatre (Saint Petersburg)	Salvador Dalí
2012	?ToHim?	?ולו?	Play by Martin Mogilner, Acer Festival	The Director
2011	Policeman	שוטר	Film by Nadav Lapid	
2011	Catch the Spy	תפסו את המרגל	Play by Ram Rahamim	

Video works
Year	Title	Role
2020	Bueno Bueno	Creator, performer
2020	More	Creator, performer
2020	The Venue Will Shut	Creator, performer
2020	Frogs	Creator, performer
2020	Pre-pay	Creator, performer
2020	Another will fill your place	Creator, performer
2020	Locked (short documentary)	Creator
2016	Famous Performance Artist	Creator, performer
2014	Noise (Short Film)	Creator

=== Poetry ===
- His debut poetry book "No Other" will be published in 2026 (publisher: HaTahana)
- His poems have been published in "Haaretz," "Maariv," and "Granta Magazine"
- Guest poet at Tel Aviv Poetry Festival, 2016

== Biography ==
Bronz was born in Odessa in 1984. His father is a Holocaust survivor. Bronz immigrated to Israel in 1990. He is a graduate of the Nissan Nativ acting studio, Yoram Levenstein Acting School and the Minshar School of Art.

Since 2015, he has been the house director of Clipa Theatre.

He has been teaching the Shakespeare course at the Nissan Nativ Acting Studio in Tel Aviv since 2013.
