= Guez =

Guez can mean:

== People ==
- Ben Guez (born 1987), American baseball outfielder in the Detroit Tigers organization
- David Guez (born 1982), French tennis player
- Dor Guez, Israeli photography and video artist
- Jean-Louis Guez de Balzac (1597–1654), French author
- Mateo Guez, French director, writer, photographer, and producer. Resides in Canada.
- Mathilda Guez (1918–90), Israeli politician who served as a member of the Knesset for Rafi

== Other uses ==
- Looking for Moshe Guez, 2011 Israeli documentary film
