= A Touch Away =

A Touch Away may refer to:

- A Touch Away (TV series), a 2006 Israeli television miniseries
- Bemerhak Negia Mikan or A Touch Away, a 2005 album by Izhar Ashdot
- "A Touch Away", a song by Deep Purple from the album Purpendicular
