= The Kindergarten Teacher =

The Kindergarten Teacher can refer to:

- The Kindergarten Teacher (2014 film), a 2014 Israeli film
- The Kindergarten Teacher (2018 film), a 2018 American film
