= Yiftach Klein =

Israeli actor (born 1972)

- יפתח קליין
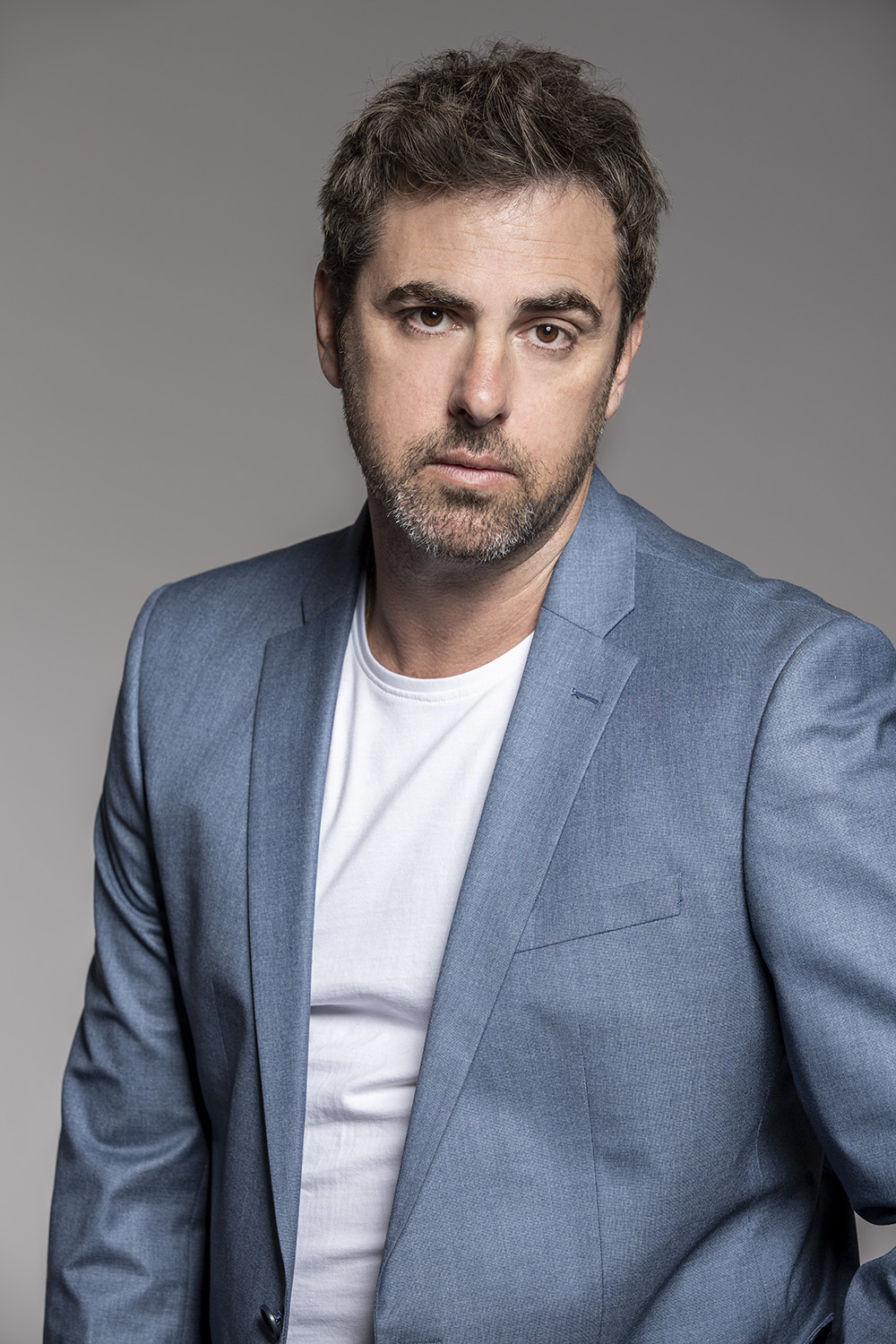
- Born: 28 September 1972 (age 53); Batzra, Israel
- Occupation: Actor
- Spouse: Shiri Artzi

Yiftach Klein (Hebrew: יפתח קליין; born 28 September 1972) is an Israeli actor. He has been nominated for two Ophir Awards for Best Supporting Actor in 2007 for Noodle and for Best Actor in 2011 for his role in Policeman.

== Early life ==
He was born and raised in Batzra, a moshav in Central Israel. He is the eldest of three brothers. The family later moved to Rosh Pinna in the Korazim Plateau in the Upper Galilee.

He discovered acting and decided to pursue it as a profession after he was cast in his high school school play, "Days of Shadow". After graduating from high school, he was conscripted into the Israel Defense Forces. Afterwards he studied at the Nissan Nativ Acting Studio in Tel Aviv.

== Career ==
He spent the first years of his acting career in repertory theatre. He got his breakout role at the age of 26 when in 1998 he appeared in the popular Israeli television series, Tironoot (The Apprentices).

In 2011 he appeared alongside Michael Aloni in Nadav Lapid's drama film, Policeman. He was nominated for an Ophir Awards for Best Supporting Actor for his role.

In 2012 he appeared in Fill the Void, a critically-acclaimed film focusing on the Haredi community in Tel Aviv. A. O. Scott praised his performance in The New York Times: "As Yochay, Mr. Klein is a gentle, brooding presence and also an intriguing, at times almost frightening enigma." The film critic, Deborah Young, wrote in The Hollywood Reporter: "Klein has a reserved masculinity that is never undermined by letting his sensitivity show through."

In 2012 he also appeared in the Israeli short film, Summer Vacation, where Klein plays a man on vacation with his wife and children. However, he encounters his former gay lover. The film was shortlisted among ten competing for best short film at the 87th Academy Awards in 2015.

In 2017 he wrote, directed and acted alongside Tali Sharon in a play, "Slide Night" (ערב שקופיות) based on his own marriage and marital struggles.

In 2018-2019, he starred alongside Angel Bonanni in the second season of False Flag. The series was also part of the lineup of the Berlin International Film Festival in 2019.

In 2023 he starred alongside Tzachi Halevy in The Cops (HaShotrim).

He has also directed a play in Dimona and managed a small theatre in Kiryat Shmona. On behalf of the Charles and Lynn Schusterman Family Philanthropies he spent a semester and a half at the University of Florida, where he also taught.

== Personal life ==
Klein met his future wife, Shiri Artzi, when they were both 23. She is the daughter of Shlomo Artzi. They married in 2013, when they were both 40. They separated in 2017 for 18 months and the experience inspired a book project by Artzi. They subsequently got back together. They have three children together. The family lives in Northern Tel Aviv.

In 2025 he expressed support for a controversial plan to ethnically cleanse the gaza strip.

== Filmography ==
Year	Title	Role	Notes
1998	Tironoot	Gidi Golan	6 episodes
1998	Mishpacha VaChetzi	Yaron	1 episode: Harey At Mekudeshet
2000	Puzzle	Adam	1 episode: Chaverim Chadashim
2003	Grand Rabbi	Inspector Yariv Daniely	TV series
2006	Emile's Girlfriend	Yoav	Original title: Ha'Chavera Shell Emile directed by Nadav Lapid
2006	Best Friends	Boaz	Miniseries. Original title: Haverot Hachi Tovot
2007	Noodle	Mati gueta	
2007	Wild Dogs		Original title: Rak Klavim Ratzim Hofshi
2007	Ha-Ex Ha-Mitologi		TV series
2008	Until the Wedding	Yochay	Original title: Ad Hachatuna
2008-2010	The Ran Quadruplets	Nivo Ran	Series regular
2010	Sea Salt	Noam	Original title: Melach Yam
2011	Policeman	Yaron	Directed by Nadav Lapid
2012	Fill the Void	Yochay	Directed by Rama Burshtein
2012	Summer Vacation	Yuval	Short film presented at 2013 Sundance Film Festival
2012	Mom and Dads	Erez	Series regular. Original title: Ima VeAbaz.
2010-2013	Blue Natalie	Yoni	Series regular
2015	Milk and Honey	Nir	TV series
2017	Azimuth	Moti	
2017	Madam Yankelova's Fine Literature Club		Original title: HaMoadon LeSafrut Yaffa Shel Hagveret Yanlekova
2018	Entebbe	Ehud Barak	
2018	Broken Mirrors	Giora	
2018-2019	False Flag	Sagi Kedmi	Season 2 regular. Original title: Kfulim
2019	Love in Suspenders	Tammy's son	Original title: Ahava Bi'Shlei'kes
2020	One on One	Yoni Mor	3 episodes
2022–present	Yeladim BaYa'ar (Broken Ties)	Ami Shlush	Series regular
2023–present	Korduroy (Corduroy)	Eran	Series regular
2023	The Cops (HaShotrim)	Daniel Kelner	8 episodes
2023	Five and a Half Love Stories in an Apartment in Vilnius, Lithuania	Issa	
