= Yeho =

Israeli singer and actor

Yeho יהו
- Born: Yoni Getreuer (יוני גטרויר); October 25, 1977 (age 48)
- Genres: Pop
- Occupations: Singer, actor
- Years active: 2000–present
- Labels: 11:11

Yeho, real name Yoni Getreuer (Hebrew: יוני גטרויר; born 25 October 1977), is an Israeli singer and actor. He has performed under the stage names Gatro and Yehonathan. He has had a long collaboration with Israeli music producer Lyrik.

== Career ==
Yeho was born in Tel Aviv. He started singing at a very early age and became a teen heartthrob with popularity with the girl/teen audiences in Israel. Although he came out to his own family, he remained closeted for the beginning of his musical career.

In 2000, he released his first album, in Hebrew, entitled Medabrim Al Ze (Hebrew: מדברים על זה). During this period he performed at the traditional Hanukkah children event Festigal, the Miss Israel beauty pageant, and as a support act for Westlife, Melanie C, and the boy band, 5ive.

In 2002, he moved to Los Angeles to study acting. In 2006, he released the first single "Kore Leha" (Hebrew for "Calling You"), a gay love song. The single represented Yeho's official coming-out to his fans. The video version of the song went on to top the charts in Israel.

In 2007 "Be'layla Ham Ba'kayitz" (Hebrew for "On a Hot Summer Night") was released and immediately turned into a huge dance club hit and was named "one of the top 10 gay videos of all time" by DNA Magazine.

In 2008, he co-starred in a recurring role on the highly provocative Israeli TV series, The Ran Quadruplets, where he played Nadav, a sexually charged young man embroiled in the world of Tel Aviv's pulsating gay scene.

The aptly titled My Turn was Yeho's first full-length English album and EP and was released in May 2009 and was produced by Lyrik. His video of "Just Another Summer" received its worldwide premiere on Logo and made it to the top of Logo music chart. the following singles "My Turn" and "Remember When" also made it to the top of Logo's music chart. Yeho was introduced to America as the cover man and featured interview in Instinct Magazine's May 2009 issue.

In 2010, Yeho released My Turn – The Remix Album which included several remix tracks to "My Turn" album songs. Later that year Yeho and Lyrik toured together in their US and Canada summer tour entitled "Remember When Tour".

On 26 February 2013, Yeho officially released his second full-length English album Yeho, containing 10 tracks, produced by Lyrik. Lyrik also appears in the album on the song "You'll Be Loved". Also appearing on the album is the Russian LGBT singer Daniell Gertsegov in the song "My Yeho."

In 2017, Yeho re-released his previous albums under the album titles The Original Hebrew Album, The Original Album and The Original Album Remixed adding never before released tracks and remastered and revised versions of the previous albums' tracks.

== Discography ==
=== Albums ===
- 2000: Medabrim Al Ze (Hebrew: מדברים על זה) (in Hebrew)
- 2009: My Turn (in English)
- 2010: My Turn – The Remix Album (in English)
- 2013: Yeho (in English)
- 2017: The Original Hebrew Album (in Hebrew)
- 2017: The Original Album (in English)
- 2017: The Original Album Remixed (in English)
- 2017: Exordium (in English)
- 2017: Lyrik Does Yeho (in English)
- 2019: Something About You (in English)

=== Singles ===
- 2006: "Kore Lecha" (in Hebrew)
- 2007: "Belayla Ham Bakaitz" (in Hebrew)
- 2008: "Just Another Summer" (in English)
- 2008: "My Turn" (in English)
- 2009: "Nifradnu Kach" (in Hebrew)
- 2009: "Remember When" (in English)
- 2010: "Tahzor Habayta" (in Hebrew)
- 2010: "Say Goodnight" (in English)
- 2013: "I Got To" (in English)
- 2013: "Close to You" (in English)
- 2017: "Catboy" (in English)

== Videography ==
- 2006: "Kore Lecha"
- 2007: "Belayla Ham Bakaitz"
- 2008: "Just Another Summer" (premiered on MTV)
- 2008: "My Turn" (premiered on MTV)
- 2009: "Nifrandu Kach"
- 2009: "Remember When" (premiered on MTV)
- 2010: "Tahzor Habayta"
- 2010: "Say Goodnight"
- 2011: "Across the Universe" (Feat. Lyrik)
- 2013: "I Got To"

== See also ==
- LGBT rights in Israel
