= Summer Vacation =

Summer vacation is a school holiday in summer between school years.

Summer Vacation may also refer to:

== Film and television ==
- Summer Vacation 1999, a 1988 Japanese romance film
- Hotel Transylvania 3: Summer Vacation, a 2018 animated American film
- Summer Vacation (2023 film), a Spanish comedy film
- Summer Vacation (2012 film), an Israeli short film
- Summer Vacation (2020 TV series), a 2020 South Korean reality show
- Summer Vacation (2026 TV series), a 2026 South Korean television series
- Lego Star Wars: Summer Vacation, a 2022 television special
- "Summer Vacation", episodes of the Indian TV series Best of Luck Nikki (an adaptation of Good Luck Charlie)

== Songs ==
- "Summer Vacation" (song), a 2019 song by Lead
- "Summer Vacation", a song from the 1990 album The Party

== See also ==
- Summer Vacation in SMTown.com, a series of albums by SM Town
