= Music festival =

Expansive music performance event

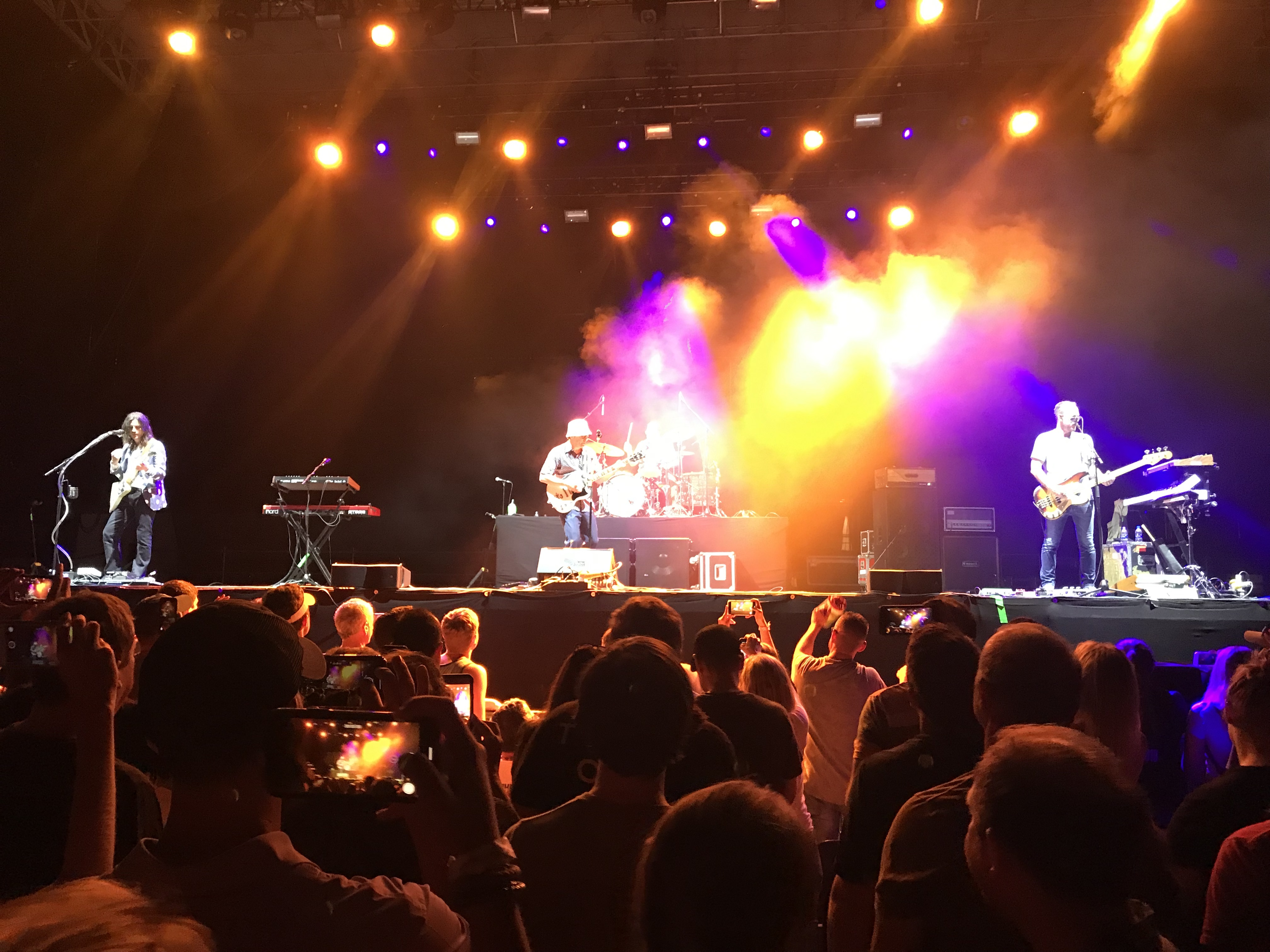
Musikfest, an eleven-day outdoor music festival held annually each August in Bethlehem, Pennsylvania, is the largest free music festival in the United States, drawing over 1.3 million attendees.

A music festival is a community event with performances of singing and instrument playing that is often presented with a theme such as musical genre (e.g., rock, blues, folk, jazz, classical music), musical instrument, nationality, locality of musicians, or holiday. Music festivals are generally organized by individuals or organizations within networks of music production, typically music scenes, the music industries, or institutions of music education.

Music festivals are commonly held outdoors, with tents or roofed temporary stages for the performers. Often music festivals host other attractions such as food and merchandise vending, dance, crafts, performance art, and social or cultural activities. Many festivals are annual, or repeat at some other interval, while some are held only once. Some festivals are organized as for-profit concerts and others are benefits for a specific charitable cause. At music festivals associated with charitable causes, there may be information about social or political issues.

== History ==
=== Ancient and medieval ===
The Pythian Games at Delphi included musical performances, and may be one of the earliest festivals known. During the Middle Ages, festivals were often held as competitions.

=== Modern ===
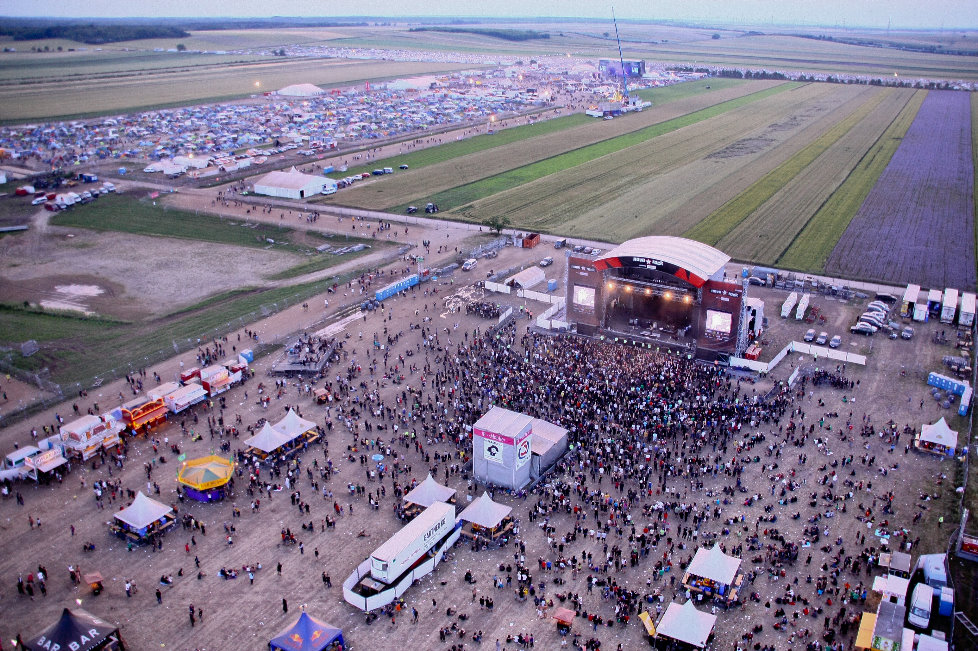
Music festival in Nickelsdorf, Austria, picturing both the main stage and the camping grounds on the farm behind

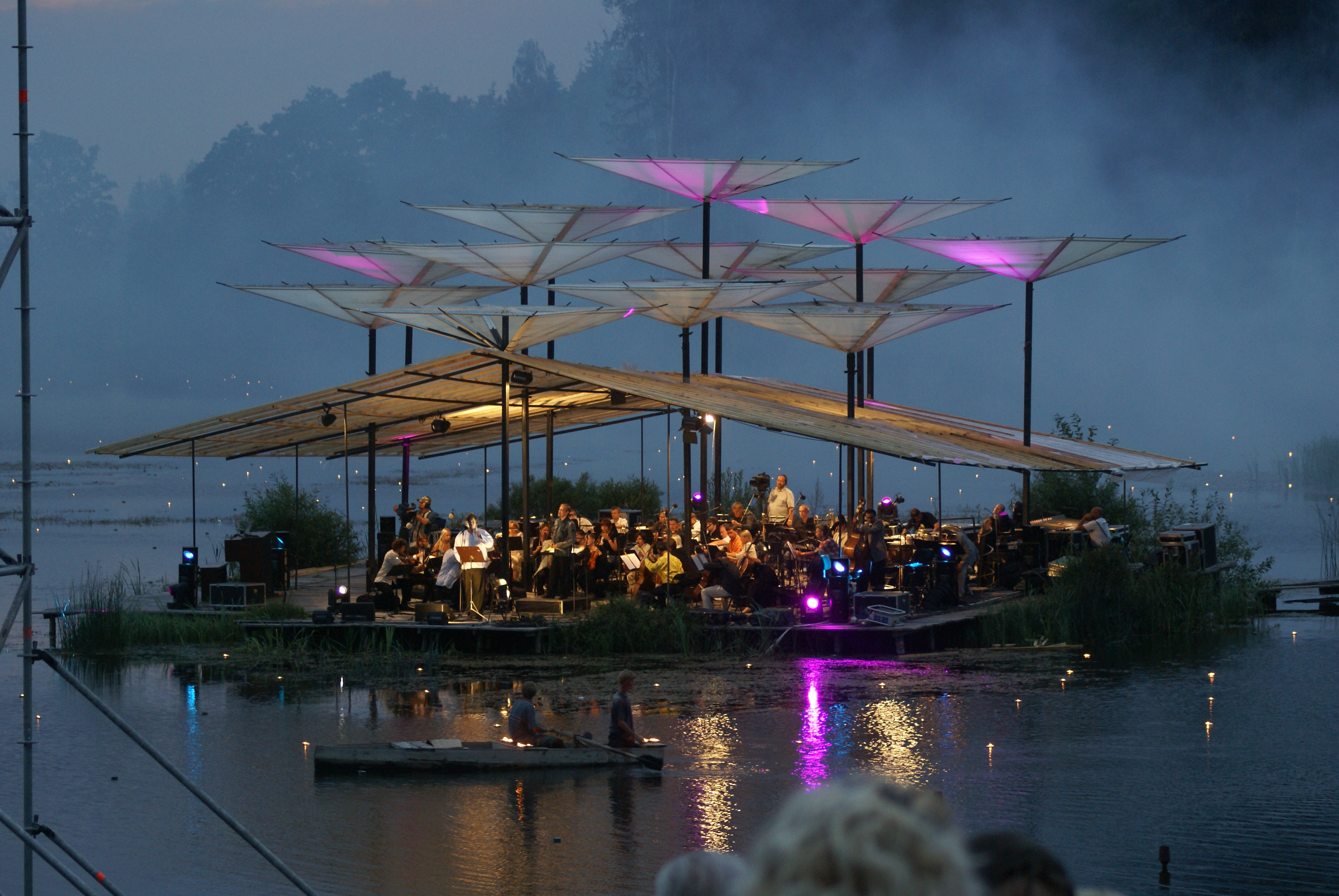
Leigo Järvemuusika in 2007

The music festival emerged in England in the 18th century, as an extension of urban concert life into a form of seasonal, cultural festivity, structured around a schedule of music performances, or concerts. Music festivals generally feature regular and extensive programming, rather than more spontaneous or improvised forms of music festivity. In traditional genres such as folk and classical music, a music festival can be defined as a community event, with performances of singing and instrument playing, that is often presented with a theme such as a music genre (e.g., blues, folk, jazz, classical music), nationality, locality of musicians, or holiday.

Music festivals have developed as an industry which contributes to national economies. For example, Coachella Valley Music and Arts Festival earned $115 million in 2017. Music festivals can be a way of building a brand for a destination, creating a unique image for it and attracting visitors. For example, Lollapalooza, Electric Daisy Carnival Las Vegas, Ultra Music Festival, Electric Forest, Gathering of the Juggalos, Download Festival and others.

While contemporary festivals are often represented as flourishing grounds for extraordinary experiences, they increasingly serve as a way to create cultural identity, lifestyle, community, belonging and self-actualisation. Furthermore, festivals are a manifestation for creating escapism and a seasonal cultural economy to experience ritually and collectively.

== Music education ==
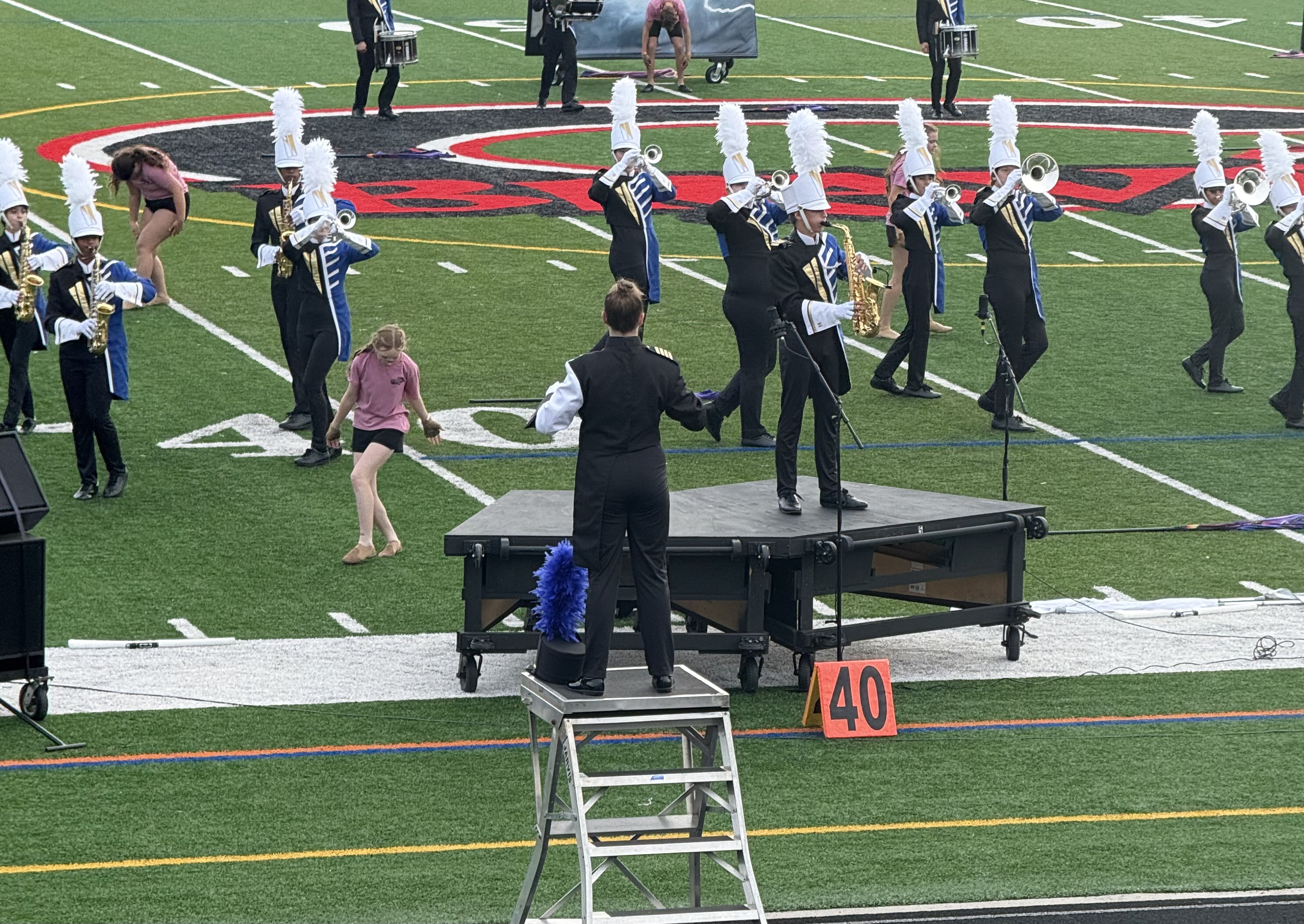
The Loudoun County High School Marching Band performs for judges at a USBands organized music festival at Chopticon High School, Maryland, U.S.

Another type of music festival is found within music education, often organized annually in local communities, regionally, or nationally, for the benefit of amateur musicians of all ages and grades of achievement. Entrants perform prepared pieces or songs in front of an audience which includes competitors, family and friends, and members of the community, along with one or more adjudicators or judges. These adjudicators, who may be music teachers, professors, or professional performers, provide verbal and written feedback to each performer or group. The adjudicator may be someone whom they might never meet in any other way, as is the case when an adjudicator from another city is brought in to judge. They also usually receive a certificate, classified according to merit or ranking, and some may win trophies or even scholarships. The most important aspect is that participants can learn from one another rather than compete. Such festivals aim to provide a friendly and supportive platform for musicians to share in the excitement of making music. For many, they provide a bridge from lessons and examinations to performing confidently in public; for a few of the top performers, they provide a pathway to further professional study of music in a college, university or conservatory.

== Festivals around the world ==
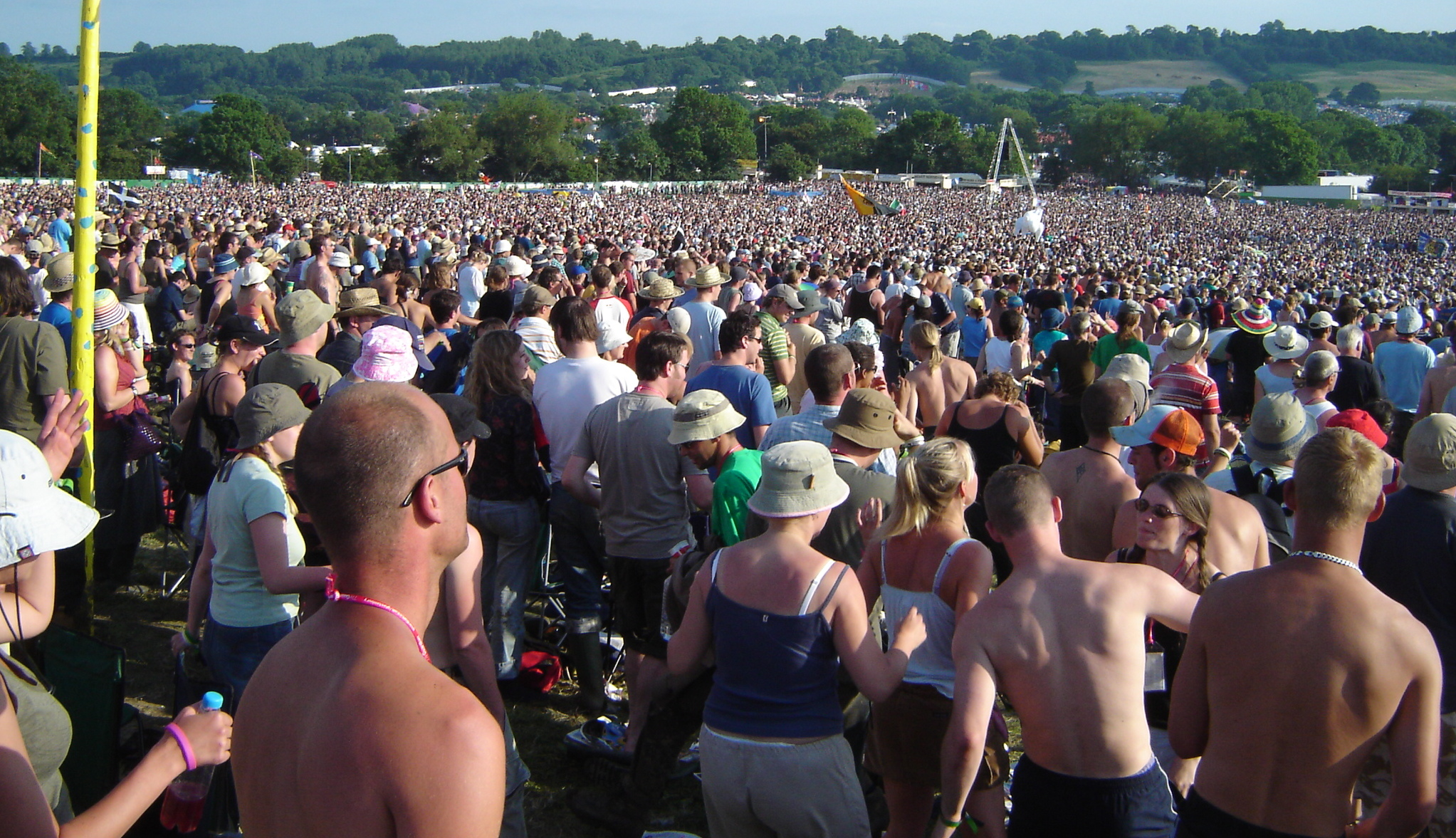
Glastonbury Festival in 2005

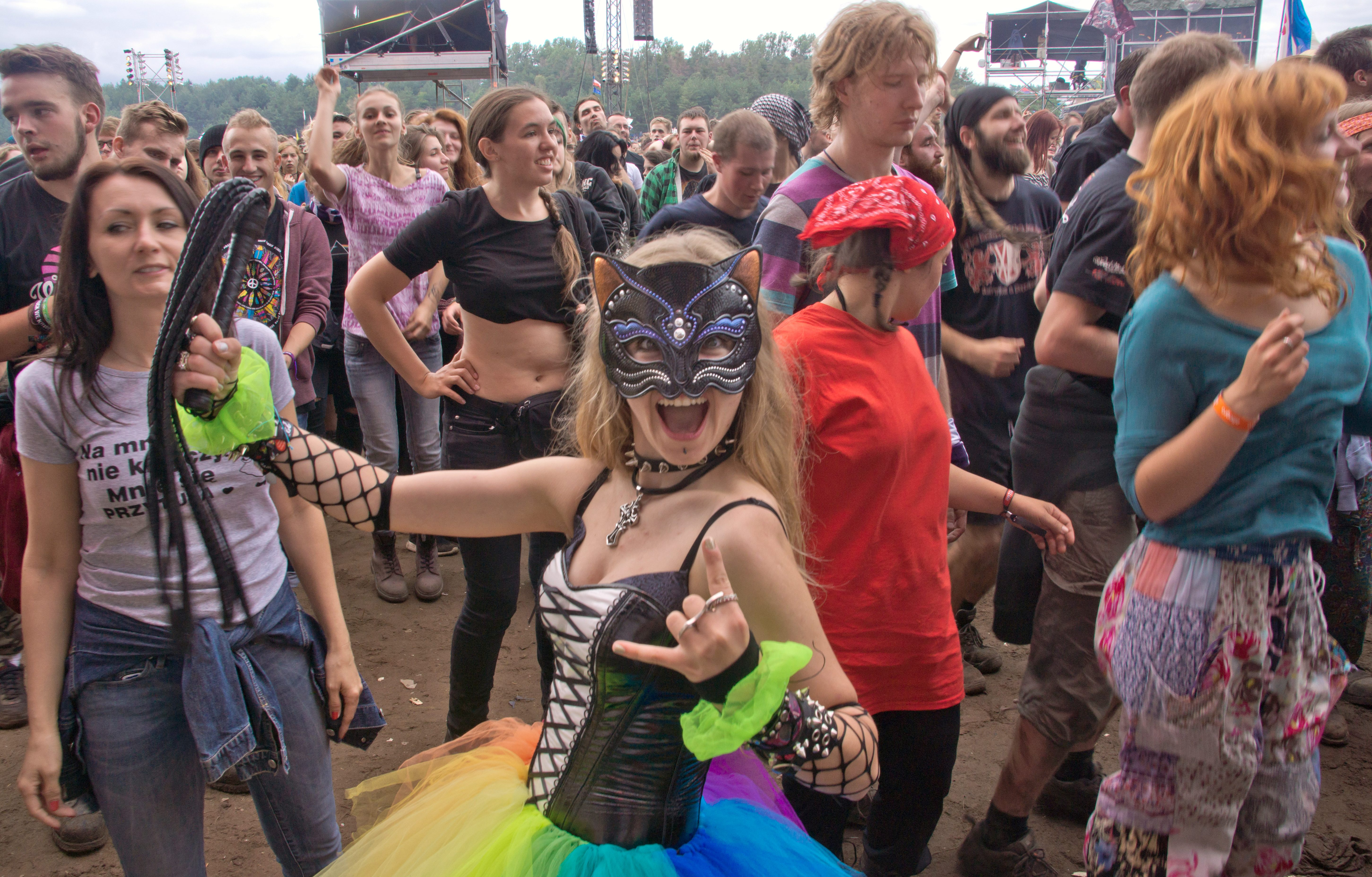
Youth attend Przystanek Woodstock festival of rock music in Poland in 2016

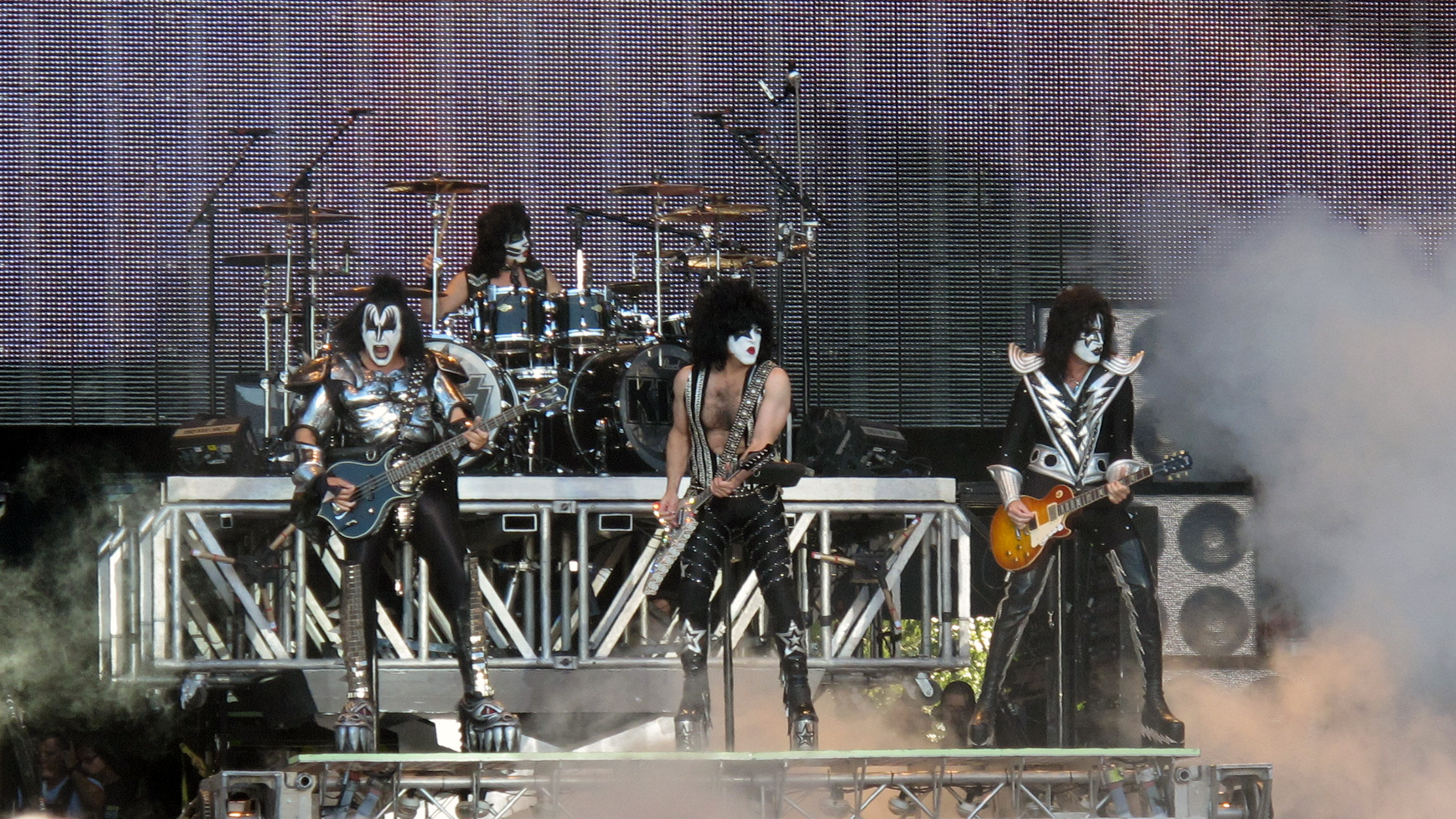
Kiss performing at the 2010 Sauna Open Air Metal Festival in Tampere, Finland

Milwaukee, Wisconsin's 11-day event, Summerfest, promotes itself as "The World's Largest Music Festival." Operating annually since 1968, the festival attracts between 800,000 and 1,000,000 people each year, and hosts over 800 musical acts. The Woodstock Festival in 1969 drew nearly 500,000 attendees, and the Polish spin-off Przystanek Woodstock in 2014 drew 750,000 thus becoming the largest open air annual festival in Europe and the second largest in the world. In comparison, the Roskilde Festival in Denmark, attracts about 135,000 spectators each year. Glastonbury Festival has a capacity of about 275,000 spectators, but has "fallow years" roughly every five years, so it is the biggest non-annual greenfield festival in the world. The oldest annual dedicated pop music festival in the world is Pinkpop Festival in the Netherlands, though in other genres, there are much older ones: the Three Choirs Festival in the UK has run annually since 1719. The Queensland Music Festival, established in 1999 and headquartered in Brisbane Australia, is the largest music festival by land mass, as a state-wide music biennial music festival, over a three-week period during July.

== Lists of music festivals ==
Lists of music festivals in:

- Antigua and Barbuda
- Australia
- Belgium
- Canada
- Central America
- China
- Cyprus
- Denmark
- Finland
- France
- Germany
- Greece
- India
- Indonesia
- Ireland
- Israel
- Italy
- The Netherlands
- New Zealand
- Poland
- Romania
- Saudi Arabia
- Singapore
- South Korea
- United Arab Emirates
- United Kingdom
- United States

=== Lists of music festivals by genre ===
- List of jazz festivals
- List of metal festivals
- List of electronic music festivals
- List of reggae festivals
- List of punk rock festivals
- List of gothic festivals
- List of choral festivals

== See also ==
- Rock festival
- Rave
- New rave
- Environmental impact of live music
