= Lyrik =

Israeli music producer

Liran Shoshan לירן שושן
- Birth name: Liran Shoshan
- Genres: Electronica, dance, pop, progressive house, big room
- Occupation(s): Producer, songwriter, singer
- Labels: Liran Shoshan Music
- Website: circuitxofficial.com

Liran Shoshan, (Hebrew: לירן שושן) better known by his stage name Lyrik (Hebrew: ליריק), is an Israeli music producer, songwriter and singer born in Jerusalem. He is founder of the production house Lyrik Productions. He has cooperated with renowned international DJs and producers like Tiësto, Paul Oakenfold and was signed by their labels "Black Hole" and "Perfecto". In addition to his international collaborations, Lyrik has worked extensively with Israeli artists, most notably Sarit Hadad, Michal Amdurski, Assaf Gad Hanun and Yeho. Lyrik's production style for these Israeli artists tends to incorporate electro sounds and trance music elements. Some of his notable productions for local acts include the hit singles "LeAn" for Sarit Hadad and "Od Ish" for Michal Amdurski.

He has a long-time collaboration with Israeli artist Yeho producing many of the latter's albums, most notably My Turn in 2009 and Yeho in 2013. The two also toured together the United States in their joint "Remember When Tour". Lyrik also appears frequently in Yeho's music videos and has released many remixes of Yeho's songs. In 2012, Lyrik signed with the European dance label Golden Globe and is currently working with Yehon on the artist's third full length English album due out in winter 2014.

== Partial discography ==
- "Across the Universe" (Yeho and Lyrik)
- "Leh" (Yeho and Lyrik)
- "Over Emotion" (Lyrik feat. Natali)
