= Yes (2025 film) =

2025 drama film

- International promotional poster
- Hebrew: כן!
- Directed by: Nadav Lapid
- Written by: Nadav Lapid
- Produced by: Judith Lou Lévy; Hugo Sélignac; Antoine Lafon
- Starring: Ariel Bronz; Efrat Dor; Naama Preis; Aleksei Serebryakov; Sharon Alexander
- Cinematography: Shaï Goldman
- Edited by: Nili Feller
- Music by: Sleeping Giant; Omer Klein
- Production companies: Les Films du Bal; Chi-Fou-Mi Productions; Bustan Films; Komplizen Film; AMP Filmworks; Arte France Cinéma
- Distributed by: Les Films du Losange (France)
- Release dates: 22 May 2025 (Cannes); 17 September 2025 (France)
- Running time: 150 minutes
- Countries: France; Israel; Cyprus; Germany
- Languages: Hebrew; English
- Box office: $448,598

Yes (Hebrew: כן!, romanized: Ken!) is a 2025 satire film written and directed by Nadav Lapid. A co-production between France, Israel, Cyprus, and Germany, it follows Y. (Ariel Bronz), a struggling pianist and comedian who is commissioned to compose a new Israeli national anthem following the October 7 attacks.

The film had its world premiere at the Directors' Fortnight section of the 2025 Cannes Film Festival on 22 May, and was theatrically released in France by Les Films du Losange on 17 September.

== Plot ==
Jazz musician Y. is struggling to make ends meet alongside his wife Yasmin, a dancer and hip-hop instructor. They live with their young son Noah in a modest apartment in Tel Aviv, selling their art to the country's elite and taking on gigs which bring "comfort" to the nation following the October 7 attacks.

Soon, Y. dyes his hair blond and is tasked with composing a new national anthem with bellicose lyrics. He is paid by a Russian oligarch who expects praise for the IDF and the atrocities committed in Gaza over the past months. Y. travels to the Gaza envelope, where his ex-girlfriend Leah, who is serving in the IDF, lays out the reasons why he should take the gig, but Y. is not convinced.

== Cast ==
- Ariel Bronz as Y.
- Efrat Dor as Yasmin
- Naama Preis as Leah
- Aleksei Serebryakov as Big Billionaire
- Sharon Alexander as Avinoam

== Production ==
In May 2023, it was announced Nadav Lapid had received financing from the Israel Film Fund for the film. In June 2023, Arte France Cinéma boarded the project. The project also attended the Marché du Film with the project in May 2024.

Principal photography took place in location from April to June 2024 in Tel Aviv and Cyprus. Lapid also filmed some scenes on a train in Morbihan in December 2024, featuring Yasmine and a young Noah, with the vast green landscapes of Brittany in the background.

== Release ==
It had its world premiere at the 78th Cannes Film Festival 22 May 2025, in the Directors' Fortnight section. It was screened on 20 July 2025 at the 2025 New Horizons Film Festival in Wrocław in the "Masters" section. It was also showcased at the 31st Sarajevo Film Festival in 'Kinoscope' section in August. It was screened in the 'Best of 2025' section of the 20th Rome Film Festival in October 2025.

It was released on 17 September 2025 in French theaters. Kino Lorber distributed the film in the United States.

The film premiered in Israel on 20 July 2025 at the Jerusalem Film Festival, and received a standing ovation at the end. At first, the film was not purchased for extensive commercial distribution in Israel. An article in Yedioth Ahronoth claimed in Lapid's name that the Israeli distribution companies refuse to distribute the film, and that a major distribution company showed great interest and then withdrew its offer.

== Reception ==
=== Critical response ===
On the review aggregator website Rotten Tomatoes, 93% of 30 critics' reviews are positive. The website's consensus reads: "A maximalist meditation on malaise, Nadav Lapid's Yes doesn't offer up easy answers but certainly poses thought-provoking questions with comedic flair." Metacritic, which uses a weighted average, assigned the film a score of 85 out of 100, based on 17 critics, indicating "universal acclaim".
