= Madam Yankelova's Fine Literature Club =

- DVD cover
- Directed by: Guilhad Emilio Schenker
- Release date: 2017
- Country: Israel
- Language: Hebrew

Madam Yankelova's Fine Literature Club (Hebrew: המועדון לספרות יפה של הגברת ינקלובה, tr. HaMo'adon LeSifrut Yaffa Shel HaGveret Yankelova) is a 90-minute 2017 Israeli Hebrew-language independent dramatic art film directed by Guilhad Emilio Schenker, at his directorial debut.

== Synopsis ==
The film, which premiered on 6 September 2017 as part of Israeli Cinema Day (general release followed on 7 June 2018), was screened at the 2017 Haifa International Film Festival, at the 2017 Jüdisches Filmfestival Wien, at Sderot Cinematheque's 2017 Cinema South International Film Festival, at Fantastic Fest on 22 September 2018, at the 2018 San Diego Comic-Con, and at the 2018 Montreal World Film Festival (where it was nominated for the Golden Zenith), and was released on DVD on 4 March 2019, has been in development since 2013, was financed by RGE Media Group's Channel 10, B Communications's Bezeq's Yes's Yes Israeli Cinema, Mifal HaPayis's, Ministry of Culture and Sport's Israel Film Council's, and Tel Aviv-Yafo Municipality's Yehoshua Rabinovich Foundation for the Arts, Tel Aviv, the Ministry of Culture and Sport's Israel Film Council, Mifal HaPayis's Mifal HaPais Council for the Culture and Arts, and the Israel Film Fund, was produced by Marek Rozenbaum, was scored by Tal Yardeni (with the music being performed by the Ra'anana Symphonette, conducted by Rafi Kadishzon), and has won the Ophr Award for Best Makeup and the Ophir Award for Best Costume Design at the 2017 Ophir Awards (where it was also nominated for the Ophir Award for Best Supporting Actress, the Ophir Award for Best Sound, the Ophir Award for Best Art Direction, and the Ophir Award for Best Cinematography). It follows Sophie Kafry (Keren Mor), a librarian and member of a women-only bookclub founded by Madam Yankelova (Lea Koenig) and managed by Razia Harari (Razia Israeli), which meets once a week inside a Gothic castle to discuss works such as Shmuel Yosef Agnon's 1943 short story The Lady and the Peddler and Elfriede Jelinek's 1983 novel The Piano Teacher. All members are required to attend in the company of a man, whereupon said men are judged according to their attractiveness, and the member whose man has received the highest marks wins a trophy. The men, at the end of each meeting, are murdered and turned into hotdogs. Having already won ninety-nine such trophies, Sophie finds it difficult to win the one-hundredth trophy, which shall promise her a seat at the Lordesses's House, the highest status in the club's stratification system. Should she fail to do so, she might find herself demoted into a cleaning lady, together with her friend, Hana (Hana Laszlo), who tells Sophie she plans on escaping to Paris and who invites her to join. One day, Joseph (Yiftach Klein) arrives at the library in which Sophie works, in order to inquire about Agnon's works (Sophie's field of expertise) for research purposes, and she invites him to join her at the club. She falls in love with him during the next couple of days, while her neighbor, Lola (Ania Bukstein), spies on them. Sophie turns to a pawnbroker (Tuvia Tzafir) in order to mobilize funds so as to finance her escaping abroad plans, while Joseph, who by then is revealed to be an undercover policeman, finds suspicious photographs in Sophie's apartment and asks the police archivist (Alex Ansky) for information. The archivist discovers a connection between the club and Joseph's father, who has been missing ever since he was a child. Nevertheless, when Sohpie asks Joseph not to attend the weekly club meeting, he insists on coming there nonetheless. During that meeting, Sophie is declared as the winner, however, in order to win the trophy, she must murder Joseph. Instead, she decides to murder Razia and to take Lola as a hostage, in order to free Joseph. Sophie and Joseph run away, while Lola chases them, and during that chase, Lola shoots them, yet the bullet hits a flammable barrel, an action that causes the castle to go on fire. Sophie and Joseph survive this blast and run away on Joseph's motorcycle. The Film Review Council has rated this film as being appropriate for viewers aged fourteen and above. It is estimated that only around 10,300 tickets for this film have been sold domestically.
