= Hilla Vidor =

Israeli actress (born 1975)

- הילה וידור
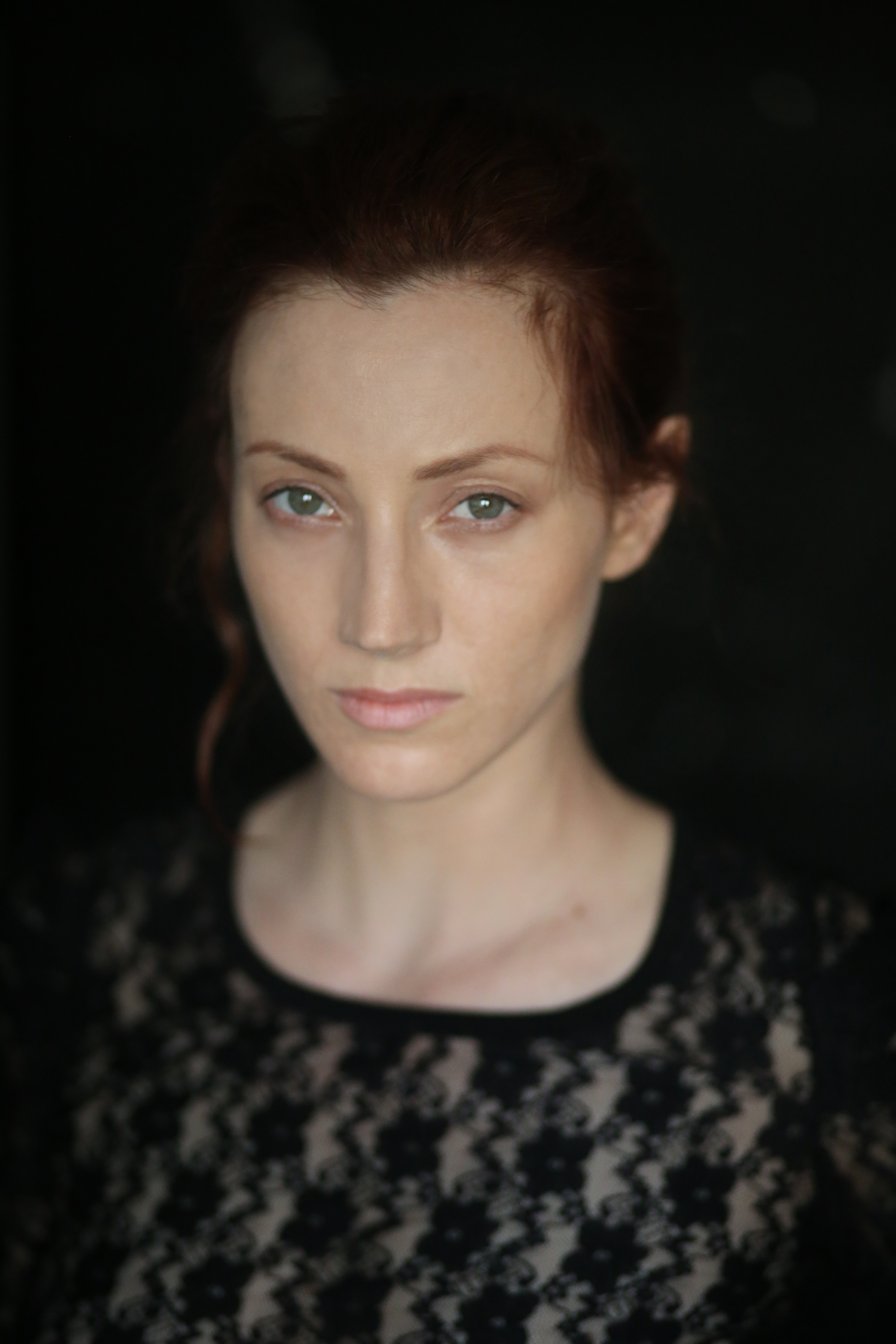
- Vidor in 2000
- Born: 20 October 1975 (age 50); Rishon LeZion, Israel
- Education: Yoram Loewenstein Performing Arts Studio
- Occupation: Actress
- Years active: 1998–present

Hilla Vidor (Hebrew: הילה וידור; born 20 October 1975) is an Israeli actress.

== Early life ==
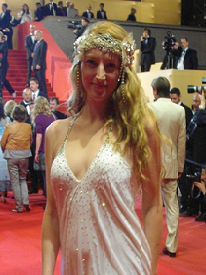
Vidor at the 2010 Cannes Film Festival

Vidor was born in Rishon LeZion. Due to financial difficulties, she dropped out of school at the age of 17 and moved out of her parents' house to live with her grandmother in Bat Yam. Her grandmother, Adela, had immigrated to Israel from Romania after World War II.

After serving in the Israeli Air Force, she moved to Tel Aviv with the intent of studying fashion design, however, she later became interested in acting. She studied acting at Yoram Loewenstein Performing Arts Studio, graduating in 2001.

== Career ==
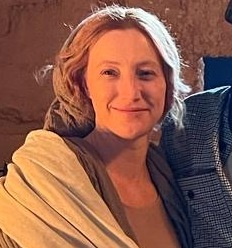
Vidor in 2024

She began her professional career at the Habima Theatre. After eight years in theater, she shifted her focus to film and television. In 2013, she won the Best Actress award at the Haifa International Film Festival for her role in the film Funeral at Noon. In 2024, she starred in Youthful Grace and played Anne in the film Mary by D. J. Caruso.

== Personal life ==
She is active in A New Way, a non-profit education organization that aims to bridge the gap between Jewish and Arab students.

== Filmography ==
=== Film ===
Year	Title	Role	Notes	Ref.
2001	Clean Sweep			
2006	Things Behind the Sun	Michal		
2006	Cold Feet	Bride		
2010	First Aid		Short film	
2011	Salsa Tel Aviv	Dafna		
2012	Summer Vacation	Michaela	Short film	
2013	Funeral at Noon	Hagar		
2014	Happiness Wrapped in a Blanket	Karin		
2014	Magic Men	Rivka		
2014	The Way Things Are	Shir	Short film	
2018	A Tramway in Jerusalem			
2018	Barefoot	Sophie	Short film	
2019	That's the Way You Love	Tamara		
2024	Youthful Grace			
2024	Mary	Anne		

=== Television ===
Year	Title	Role	Notes	Ref.
1998	Florentine	Nurse	1 episode	
2000	The Bourgeoisie	Dafna	4 episodes	
2003	Wings	Alex	7 episodes	
2006	Bad Girls	Michelle		
2008	Five Men and a Wedding	Sharon	1 episode	
2009	Room Service	Michal		
2010	15 Minutes			
2012	Kathmandu	Neta		
2012	Tel Avivites			
2013–2016	Hostages	Ella	14 episodes	
