= The Angel was a Devil =

1976 film by Moshe Guez

- Directed by: Moshe Guez
- Written by: Moshe Guez
- Produced by: Moshe Guez
- Starring: Ophelia Shtruhl; Moshe Guez; Miri Ben David; Nissim Dadon
- Edited by: Moshe Guez
- Music by: Moni Amarilio; Moshe Guez
- Release date: 1976
- Country: Israel

The Angel Was a Devil is a low-budget horror film directed by Moshe Guez. It is the first horror film that was ever produced in Israel. It was shot in 1971 and released in 1976. The film stars Ophelia Shtruhl (who is famous from her role in "Lemon Popsicle"), Guez himself, Miri Ben David, Nissim Dadon (Franco), Eli Sandler, Hina Rosovska and residents of Ramat Amidar neighborhood in Ramat Gan, where Guez lived. The film was notoriously labelled "the worst Israeli film of all time".

== Plot ==
Two female students at Bar Ilan University, Edith and Miri (played by Shtruhl and Ben David), find themselves stalked by a mysterious stranger. Edith decides to run away from the city, but the plan goes awry and she finds herself in the isolated farm of an eccentric farmer. In the background, a serial killer on the loose is stirring up the country.

== Cast ==
- Ophelia Shtruhl as Edith
- Miri Ben-David as Miri
- Nissim Dadon as Franko
- Eli Sandler as Eli
- Moshe Guez as Tzadok

== Reception ==
When the film was first released, it generated negative reviews and was taken down from the screens after a very short period of time.

However, in the upcoming years the film attracted a cult following. Since the director, Guez, left Israel in the 1980s, for many years the film has been considered "lost", and could only be viewed on rare occasions.

== Legacy ==
In 1995, the local Tel Aviv newspaper Ha'ir labelled the film as "the worst Israeli film ever", and Guez as the "Israeli Ed Wood". The magazine then held a festive screening of the film at Tel Aviv Cinematheque.

In 2011, filmmaker Avida Livny directed a documentary called "Looking for Moshe Guez".

In 2016, film scholar Ido Rosen exposed the film's new "Director's cut" in special screenings in the Israeli cinematheques. The new version included a digital restoration of the original images and sounds, re-editing, and removal of animated scenes.
