= Yehezkel Lazarov =

Israeli actor (born 1974)

Yehezkel Lazarov יחזקאל לזרוב
- Born: 8 February 1974 (age 52); Tel Aviv, Israel
- Occupations: Actor, Director
- Years active: 1982-Present

Yehezkel Lazarov (Hebrew: יחזקאל לזרוב Y'ḥezeqel Lazarov; born 8 February 1974) is an Israeli actor, director, and multidisciplinary artist. In 2022 he was elected to serve as the head of the school of Performing Arts at the Kibbutzim Seminary College.

== Biography ==
As a child, Lazarov performed as a professional tap dancer in musicals. After graduating from the High School of Arts as a ballet dancer and serving as a singer in a military band, he danced with the Batsheva Dance Company for four years. He studied theater at the Actors’ Centre in London before joining the Gesher Theatre and the Cameri Theatre as an actor.

His leading roles include Tevye in the 2018 Broadway National Tour of Fiddler on the Roof, Mack the Knife in The Threepenny Opera at the Gesher Theatre (winning the Israeli Theatre Award for best actor), Lysander in A Midsummer Night’s Dream, Figaro in The Marriage of Figaro, Avigdor in Yentl, Alexander Pen in Was It a Dream?, Rudi in The Aristocrats, the titular roles in Sholom Aleichem's Stempenyu and The Picture of Dorian Gray, and Zach in A Chorus Line. In addition to his work as an actor, Lazarov has served as the in-house choreographer at the Gesher Theatre and Cameri Theatre.

Lazarov has played leading roles in more than 40 films and television productions, including The Mentalist, Mama’s Angel (Series Mania – Official Competition, France), the Israeli films The Kindergarten Teacher and The Debt, Fragile, Russian episodic series Mata Hari, The Fifth Heaven, Waltz with Bashir (winning the Golden Globe Award for Best Foreign Language Film), Three Mothers, A Touch Away, and The Dybbuk (nominated for best actor).

As a theater director, Lazarov has served as the adapter, set designer, and choreographer for all his projects, including Lolita / Joan of Arc, Fathers and Sons, Alice, Falling Out of Time (based on the David Grossman novel) at the Gesher Theater, The Picture of Dorian Gray at the Habima Theatre, and Igloo (written by Lazarov), which premiered at the Israel Festival and won the Best Director award.

Lazarov is the artistic director and founder of Studio Ankori Middle and High School for Creative Thinking and Entrepreneurship. He is the co-founder, artistic director, and curator of AZA13, an art venue in Tel Aviv. Among his multidisciplinary exhibitions are "Hope", "Censorship", "Demonstration", and "The Art to Survive".

As a visual artist, Lazarov's photography and video artworks have been shown in several gallery exhibitions. He has written and directed a number of short films, including Snow and Lashabiya, which have been screened in many international film festivals.

== Filmography ==
=== Film/Television ===
Year	Title	Director(s)	Role	Notes
1991	Licking the Strawberry	Uri Barbach	Hezi	
1997	Florentine	Eytan Fox	Erez	
1997	The Dybbuk	Yossi Somer	Hanan	Nomination for Best Actor
1999	Woman in Gray	Nissim Dayan	Roni	
1999	Short Stories About Love	Hagai Levi	Gidi	
2001-2004	Shemesh	Yoav Tzafir	Hemi	
2005	The Game of True and False	Julie Shles	Tomi	
2007	The Shelter	Roy Hornshtein	Father	
2007	A Touch Away	Roni Ninio	Aharon	Winner, Best TV Series
2006	Three Mothers	Dina Zvi-Riklis	Felix	
2007	The Debt	Assaf Bernstein	Ehud	
2008	Waltz with Bashir	Ari Folman	Carmi Cna’an	Golden Globe Award for Best Foreign Language Film
2008	Ima'lle	Ram Nahari	Gidon	
2008	Five Men and a Wedding	Eran Kolirin, Arik Rothstein	Yair	
2009	Room Service	Rony Gruber	Eyal	
2011	Kol Hazman She’Baolam	Rani Magar	Israeli Soldier	
2011	Barefoot	Ori Sivan	Naftali	
2011	The Fifth Heaven	Dina Zvi-Riklis	Dov Markovsky	
2011	Obsession	Nissim Notrika	Sami	
2012	Ananda	Ohav Flantz	Yonatan	
2012	The World is Funny	Shemi Zarhin	Roni	
2013	Davar Al Mekom Himatzam	Yali Bergman	Nisan	
2013	Fragile	Vidi Bliu	Etan	
2014	The Kindergarten Teacher	Nadav Lapid	Aharon	Official Selection, Cannes 2014
2016	Mata Hari	Julius Berg	Costelo	
2016	The Ambassador's Wife	Dina Zvi-Riklis	Jonathan	
2016	Taagad	Zion Rubin	Avri	
2016	Mama's Angel	Eyal Sella	Eythan Tamir	
2017	Driver	Jonathan Indorski	Ovadia	
2018	Kacha Ze	Ram Nahari	Plastic Surgeon	
2018	The One Who Reads Minds (The Mentalist)	Alexey Moradov	Romanov	
2018	Call for a Dreams	Ran Slavin	Ruven	
2026	Bitva motorov	Ilya Malanin	Gustav List	

=== Theater ===
Year	Title	Role	Venue	Notes
2018	Fiddler on the Roof	Tevye	Broadway Tour	
	The Good Person of Szechwan	Yong Sun	Gesher Theatre	
	A Midsummer Night's Dream	Lysander	Gesher Theatre	
	The Threepenny Opera	Mack the Knife	Gesher Theatre	Winner, Theatre Award for Best Actor
	The Yalta Game	Demitri Gurov	Gesher Theatre	
	Design for Living	Leo	Gesher Theatre	
	Variations for Theatre and Orchestra	Singer	Gesher Theatre	
	The Marriage of Figaro	Figaro	Gesher Theatre	
	City/Odessa Stories	Commander	Gesher Theatre	
	Village	Captain Drury	Gesher Theatre	
	The Slave	Stefan	Gesher Theatre	
	Shosha	Feitelzohn	Gesher Theatre	
	A Chorus Line	Zach	Cameri Theatre	
	Was It a Dream?	Alexander Pen	Cameri Theatre	Nominated for Best Actor
	The Aristocrats	Rudi	Cameri Theatre	Nominated for Best Actor
	Yentl	Avigdor	Cameri Theatre	
	Stempenyu	Stempenyu	Cameri Theatre	
	The Wide Winged Sea	Hannan	Cameri Theatre	
	A King’s Heart	King	Cameri Theatre	
	The Picture of Dorian Gray	Dorian Gray	Habima National Theatre	
	The Wizard	Scarecrow		

=== Theatre Director ===
Year	Title	Venue	Notes
2018	Lolita/Jeanne d'Arc	Gesher Theatre	Adaptation, director, set designer
2017	Fathers and Sons	Gesher Theatre	Adaptation, director, set designer
2017	The Picture of Dorian Gray	Habima Theatre	Adaptation, director, set designer
2016	Desire at Dusk	Habima Theatre	Adaptation, director, set designer
2015	Alice	Gesher Theatre	Director, set designer
2014	Falling Out of Time	Gesher Theatre	Adaptation, director, set designer
2014	Orange Blossom	Tmuna Theatre	Adaptation, director, set designer Winner, Best Theatrical Language Award
2014	Igloo	Israel Festival, Tmuna Theatre	Writer, director, set designer Winner, Best Director Award
2012	Stempenyu	Cameri Theatre	Co-director
2007	Radio Heaven	Kibbutzim College	Writer, director, set designer
2006	Hezi	Gesher Theatre	Writer, director, set designer

=== Short films ===
Year	Title	Role	Production company
2016	Snow	Writer/Director	Green Productions
2009	Lashabiya	Writer/Director	Mitcha Figa Productions
