= InDnegev =

Israeli music festival

- Genre: Indie
- Dates: 3 days a weekend during October (with the end of Sukkot)
- Location: Negev
- Years active: 2007–present
- Website: indnegev.co.il

InDnegev (Hebrew: אינדינגב) is a music and art festival in the Negev.

== History ==
The festival was first held in 2007 and has become an annual fall event at Mitzpe Gvulot, near Kibbutz Gvulot in the western Negev. The three-day festival is held during October (coinciding with the end of the Sukkot holiday) and over the years has become the main festival for independent music in Israel.

Artists and ensembles that performed at the festival include Assaf Avidan, Lola Marsh, A-WA, Esther Rada, Geva Alon and Noga Erez.

== See also ==
- Music of Israel
- Culture of Israel
