= A Touch Away (TV series) =

2007 Israeli television miniseries

- Genre: Drama
- Created by: Zafrir Kochanovsky; Ronit Weis-Berkowitz; Ron Ninio
- Starring: Yarden Bar-Kochba; Slava Bibergal; Henry David
- Country of origin: Israel
- No. of seasons: 1
- No. of episodes: 8

Original release
- Network: Reshet
- Release: January 23, 2007

A Touch Away (Hebrew: מרחק נגיעה, romanized: Merchak Negi'aa) is a record-breaking Israeli drama television miniseries, winner of The Television Academy award פרס האקדמיה לטלוויזיה, . It was first aired in January 23, 2007 and in 2008 was bought by HBO. It was the second Israeli drama series to be bought by HBO after BeTipul.

Set in Bnei Brak, a city to the east of Tel Aviv, within the larger Tel Aviv District, in Israel, A Touch Away has been described as a kind of Romeo and Juliet story, focusing on two families from the two poles of the secular and orthodox societies living in the same building in Bnei Brak. Against all odds, Zurik Mintz, a young secular Jewish immigrant from Russia, falls in love with young Roch'le Berman from the city's Haredi (orthodox) community. Using this relationship as the basis for the story, the series explores the lives of new immigrants, non-religious, and religious Jews in Israel.

== Synopsis ==
The drama series revolves around a hopeless love story between an orthodox religious young woman and a Russian immigrant. The lives of two families interconnect in an apartment complex in the orthodox neighborhood of Bnei Brak, just outside Tel Aviv. The Bermans are a strictly religious family, whose daughter Rochale is about to enter into an arranged marriage with a wealthy young man. But sparks fly when a thoroughly secular family from Russia moves into a neighboring apartment. The forbidden love that soon blossoms between the two young neighbors, and the secrets that each family must hide, threaten the families' deep rooted traditions and challenge individual family members' beliefs. The show's various sub-plots follow the deteriorating marriage of Sasha (Slava Bibergal) and Marina (Evgenia Dodina) Mintz, Zurik's parents, with Marina having an affair, their daughter Natalia's struggles to adjust to her new life in Israel, the hardships of Leah (Yarden Bar-Kochba) and Shmuel (Tzahi Grad) Berman to have a third child, and yeshiva dean and widower Aharon Berman's (Yehezkel Lazarov) story.

== Cast ==
- Yarden Bar-Kokhva as Lea Berman
- Gaya Traub as Roha'le Berman
- Slava Bibergal as Sasha Mintz
- Henry David as Zorik Mintz
- Yevgenia Dodina as Marina Mintz
- Lucy Dubinchik as Natalia Mintz
- Tzahi Grad as Shmuel Berman
- Yehezkel Lazarov as Aaron Berman
- Nitai Gvirtz as Arieh Leiv

== Production ==
The series was created by Zafrir Kochanovsky, Ronit Weis-Berkowitz, and Ron Ninio; and directed by Ron Ninio. It is produced by Zafrir Kochanovsky and Miri Ezra (T.T.V. Productions), and aired on Reshet. Dialogue is conducted in Hebrew, Russian and some Yiddish, with subtitles in Hebrew, Russian, and English.

== Release ==
The series, first released as part of the Haifa International Film Festival on October 12, 2006, and then aired on Israeli television beginning January 23, 2007, broke many Israeli television viewing records, with the final episode garnering more viewers than any Israeli drama up until that time.

The series made its debut in the United States at the 2008 Santa Barbara International Film Festival. The episodes have been shown as part of a number of other United States film festivals, as well as other festivals and programs in Israel, and other nations around the world, sometimes followed by discussions of Israel and religious themes involved in the story.

== Awards ==
Actor Henry David won the 2006 Israeli Television Academy Best Actor Award. Additionally, the series won 2007 Awards of the Israeli Television Academy including "Best Directing", "Best Script", "Best Actor", "Best Art Design", and "Best Original Score". It also won the 2008 Washington Jewish Film Festival "Special Audience Recognition Award".

== Unmade American version ==
In 2008, HBO announced that it had secured the rights to the series, and was planning to produce an American version, retaining the Israel location and story. It is one of a number of rights deals signed in 2008 for Israeli shows being considered for American TV.

== See also ==
- Religion in Israel
- Culture in Israel
- Television in Israel
