= Tel Aviv Jazz Festival =

The Tel Aviv Jazz Festival began in 1991, it is one of the two major jazz events in Israel, the other is the Red Sea Jazz Festival. The event is held at the Tel Aviv Cinematheque every spring for three days.

As the Israeli Jazz scene presented a few interesting contemporary products like Avishay Cohen in recent years, the jazz atmosphere is set on contemporary jazz. One could observe conservative and traditional music with modern interpretations to Gershwins pieces and French chanson music performed by pop singer Efrat Gosh in the 2011 Tel Aviv Jazz festival.

The festival has been host to many world-famous jazz artists such as Gary Bartz, amongst Israeli contemporary jazz phenomena like Daniel Zamir. The festival also features different youth ensembles and troupes formed at The Rimon School of Jazz and Contemporary Music.

== Past Performers ==
- Gary Bartz Quartet
- Daniel Zamir
- The Corey Wilkes Quintet with Greg Spero
- The Chihiro Yamanaka Trio
- Irit Dekel and Eldad Zitrin
- Ester Rada
- Steven Bernstein
- George Colligan
- The Nicole Mitchell Trio
- Efrat Gosh
