= Summer Vacation (2012 film) =

- חופש גדול
- Directed by: Tal Granit; Sharon Maymon
- Screenplay by: Tal Granit; Sharon Maymon
- Produced by: Gal Greenspan; Roi Kurland
- Starring: Yiftach Klein; Oded Leopold; Hilla Vidor
- Cinematography: Shai Peleg
- Edited by: Nofar Volpo
- Release date: 2 October 2012 (Haifa Film Festival)
- Running time: 22 minutes
- Country: Israel
- Language: Hebrew

Summer Vacation (Hebrew: חופש גדול, translit. Hofesh Gadol) is a 2012 Israeli live-action short film by Tal Granit and Sharon Maymon. It was shortlisted among ten films for Best Live Action Short Film at the 87th Academy Awards in 2015. It premiered in Israel at the Haifa International Film Festival on 2 October 2012, before its United States premiere at the 2013 Sundance Film Festival.

== Summary ==
The family summer vacation of Yuval (Klein), Michaela (Vidor) and their children is interrupted by the appearance of Yuval's secret former gay lover, Yiftach (Leopold).

== Cast ==
- Yiftach Klein as Yuval
- Oded Leopold as Yiftach, Yuval's former lover
- Hilla Vidor as Michaela, Yuval's wife
- Ido Bartal, Yiftach's boyfriend
- Ruslan Levchuk as Einav, Yuval and Michaela's son
- Bar Miniely as Gaya, Yuval and Michaela's daughter

== Accolades ==
- Academy Award for Best Live Action Short Film - shortlist, nomination
- 2013 Sundance Film Festival Short Film Grand Jury Prize - nomination
- Flickerfest Best International Short Film - winner
- ImageOut Rochester LGBT Film Festival Jury Award for Best Short - winner

== See also ==
- Cinema of Israel
- List of Israeli submissions for the Academy Award for Best International Feature Film
