= Looking for Moshe Guez =

- Directed by: Avida Livny
- Screenplay by: Avida Livny; Era Lapid
- Produced by: Gidi Avivi
- Cinematography: David Zarif
- Edited by: Era Lapid
- Music by: Jonathan Bar-Giora
- Distributed by: Vice Versa Films
- Release date: October 19, 2011 (Israel)
- Running time: 75 minutes
- Country: Israel
- Language: Hebrew

Looking for Moshe Guez (Le'an Ne'elam Moshe Guez) is a 2011 Israeli documentary film directed by Avida Livny, documenting his search for the Israeli director Moshe Guez, and his "lost" feature film, The Angel was a Devil.

== Synopsis ==
Looking for Moshe Guez follows director Avida Livny as he searches for a childhood memory: his memories from the first Israeli horror film, The Angel Was a Devil, which he has seen once in the 1980s, as a 10-year-old. Having forgotten about the film, he "discovers" it again in a book by Meir Schnitzer concerning Israeli cinema. The review in Schnitzer's book caused the film to be labelled as "the worst film ever made in Israel".

The first part of Looking for Moshe Guez focuses on the search in Israel, which was produced between 1971 and 1976, with Guez as the film director, screenwriter, star, cinematographer, recorder and editor. Among the participants who remember Guez or his film are journalist Lisa Peretz, who described it as the "Israeli Ed Wood", and the actress Ophelia Struhl,. The second part of the film, which takes part in the Boston area where Guez and his family have been living since the 1980s, enables us to see for the first time scenes from the "director's cut".

== Cast ==
- Ophelia Shtruhl
- Moshe Guez
- Shulamit Guez
- Ofer Guez
- Yair Partok
- Eli Sandler
- Miri Ben David
- Karin Dadon
- Liraz Gadri
- Lisa Peretz
- Shuki Gazit
- Geula Gazit
- Zehava Damari
- Shalom Damari
- Dror Yizhar

== Production ==
The film was produced by Gidi Avivi for Noga Communications – Channel 8 with the support of the Yehoshua Rabinovich Foundation for the Arts – Cinema Project.

== Reception ==
=== Critical response ===
Avner Shavit, the film critic of Walla, describes the unique manner in which Livny presents Guez's story, without being judgmental or condescending. Shavit sees the film as "a moving, fascinating and unforgettable work of art about the different dimensions of the endless passion for film, about the eccentric dimension of local culture, and about the fact that time sometimes does not heal wounds, only makes them more painful."

== Festivals, awards and nominations ==
The premiere screening of Looking for Moshe Guez took place at the Haifa International Film Festival, on October 19, 2011. The film was selected to the 2011 edition of IDFA's Docs for Sale.

== See also ==
- Ed Wood (film)
