= Policeman (film) =

2011 film

- Film poster
- Directed by: Nadav Lapid
- Written by: Nadav Lapid
- Produced by: Itai Tamir
- Starring: Yiftach Klein
- Cinematography: Shai Goldman
- Release date: 9 July 2011 (Jerusalem Film Festival)
- Running time: 105 minutes
- Country: Israel
- Language: Hebrew

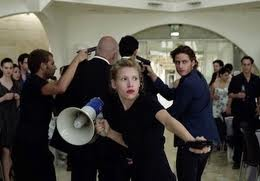
Yaara Pelzig

Policeman (Hebrew: השוטר, translit. Ha-shoter) is a 2011 Israeli drama film directed by Nadav Lapid. Policeman won multiple awards at the 2011 Jerusalem Film Festival.

== Plot ==
Klein plays Yaron the head of a counter terrorist organization. There is a hostage drama near the end of the film. Yaron's wife is pregnant. The film explores Yaron's difficulties in compartmentalizing his professional and domestic lives.

== Cast ==
- Yiftach Klein as Yaron
- Yaara Pelzig as Shira
- Michael Aloni as Nathanael
- Michael Moshonov as Oded
- Rona-Lee Shimon as Hila
- Menashe Noy as Michael
- Roy Arad
- Miri Fabian
- Tracy Abramovich
- Ben Adam as Yotam
- Meital Barda as Nili
- Ariel Barone
- Noam Boker
- Moris Cohen
- David Dector
- Shlomi Hayun
- Gal Hoyberger as Ariel
- Ady Jakubovitz

== Reception ==
The film has a "fresh" rating of 61% on Rotten Tomatoes indicating an overall positive reception. It also holds a Metacritic score of 79, indicating generally favorable reviews.

The film was highly praised by Manohla Dargis, writing in The New York Times: "In Policeman, Mr. Lapid, making an electrifying feature directing debut, traces the line between the group and the individual in a story that can be read as a commentary on the world as much as on Israel."

IndieWire reviewer, Eric Kohn gave the film an "A-" rating: "While blatantly topical, this is not a political film of the moment, but rather a calculated meditation on self-defined purpose in the midst of societal confusion."
