= Ester Rada =

Israeli actress and singer (born 1985)

Ester Rada אסתר רָדָא
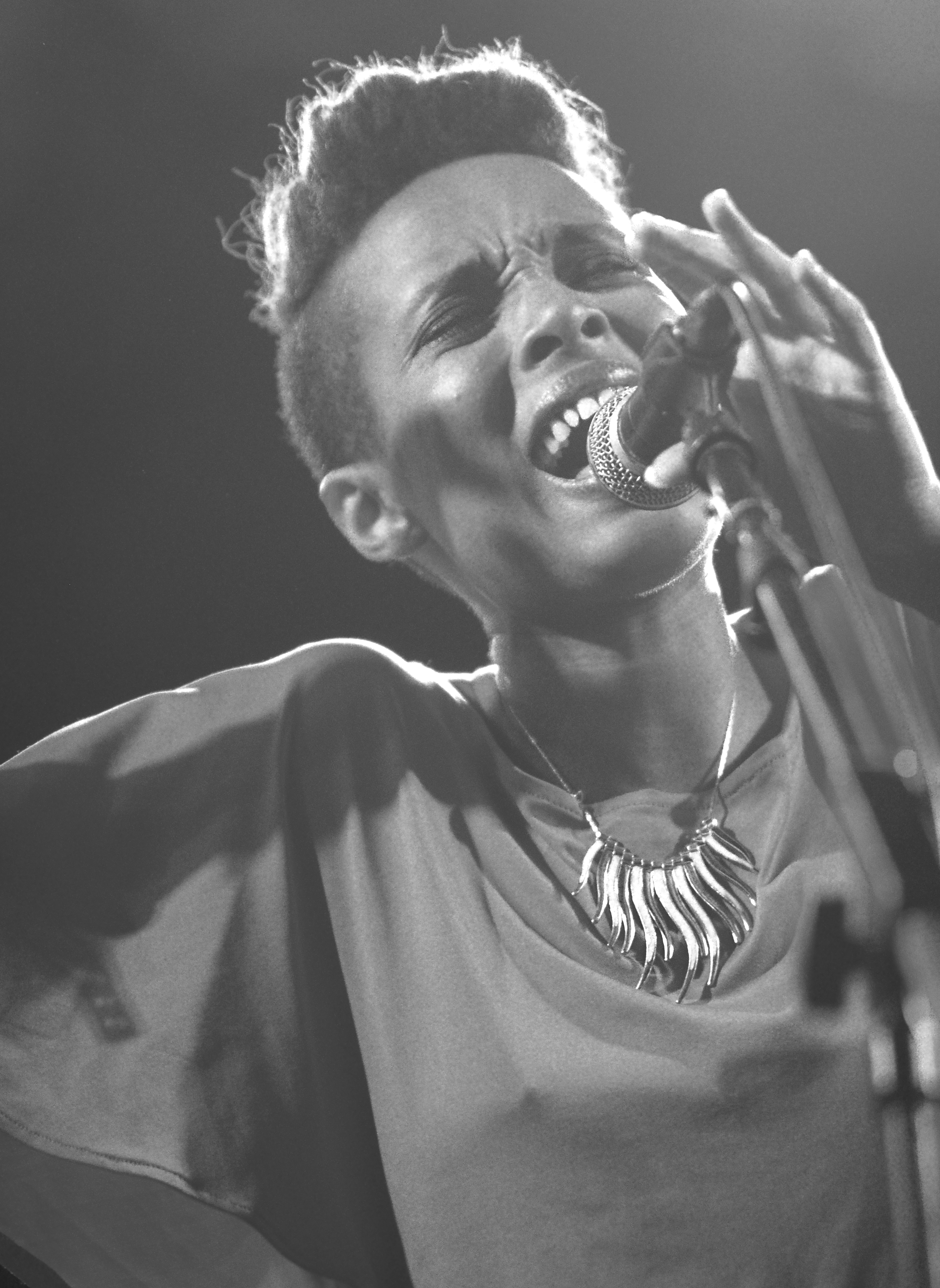
- Rada in 2012

Background information
- Born: Ester Rada; March 7, 1985 (age 41); Kiryat Arba, Judea and Samaria, Israel
- Genres: Soul; Nu-Soul, Funk; Ethio-Jazz; Groove; R&B
- Occupations: Singer–songwriter, actress
- Label: Harmonia Mundi
- Website: Official Facebook page

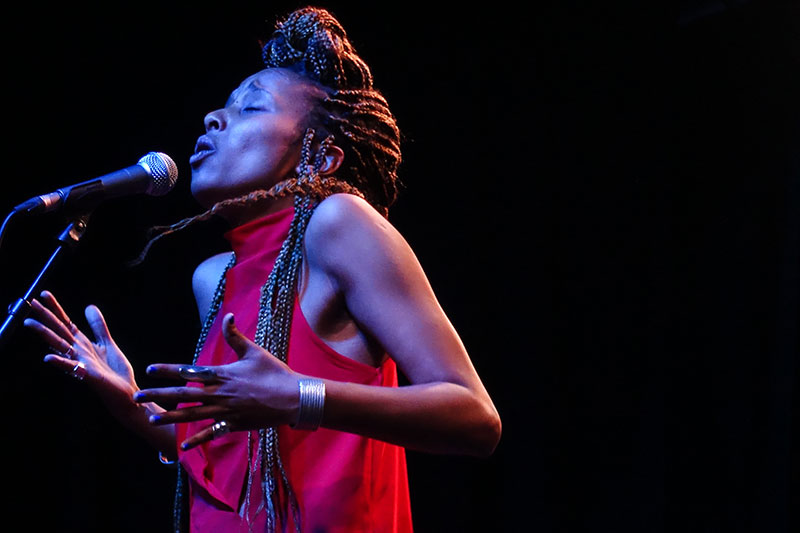
Ester Rada at Aarhus Jazz Festival, Denmark, 2016

Ester Rada (Hebrew: אסתר רָדָא; born March 7, 1985) is an Israeli actress and singer.

== Biography ==
Rada was born in Kiryat Arba, Israel, to a religious Ethiopian-Jewish family. Her parents, originally from a village near Gondar, were rescued by Israel from a refugee camp in Sudan during Operation Moses, in 1984.

She grew up speaking Amharic at home and Hebrew in school. Her father was known as a cantor in the Ethiopian community in Kiryat Arba. Her parents divorced when she was a child and later on, she moved with her mother and older brother to Netanya in 1996, when Rada was 11 years old, which she considers a turning point in her life, since the family moved to a less observant neighbourhood where the majority were Ethiopian Jews, and also started to interact with French olim, who were familiar with funk and rap, something unheard of in a religious Jewish settlement like Kiryat Arba.

She began working on her second album, after releasing her acclaimed first self-written and composed solo EP Life Happens, which was produced by Israeli producers Kuti (Kutiman/Thru-You) and Sabbo (Soulico), at the beginning of 2013, as well as her first full album, Ester Rada, in 2014.

Rada performed at the Opening Ceremonies of the 2017 Maccabiah Games on July 6, 2017.

== Career ==
Rada started her acting career in musical theater, and won an award for her role in Habima Theatre's The Troupe. In 2007, she played a major role in the TV serial Deus. In the same year she also acted in Habima's play Sdakim beBeton. Her music career started during her military service in the Israel Defense Forces, where she sang Israeli pop songs for an IDF band.

After the release of her EP, she started to gain worldwide popularity on a tour across Europe, the United States, and Canada. She performed in 2013 at the Glastonbury Festival and was the opening act of Alicia Keys' concert in Israel. Her music video "Life Happens" has been broadcast on MTV France, East Europe, and Israel, as well as on VH1 UK. Rada credits Nina Simone, Ella Fitzgerald, and Aretha Franklin as her musical influences, alongside Erykah Badu, Lauryn Hill, Jill Scott, traditional religious Bnei Akiva songs and Ethiopian Jazz, especially Mulatu Astatke and Mahmoud Ahmed

Rada has performed in several Israeli and international events, such as:

- InDnegev festival. Mitzpeh Gvulot, 2012
- Glastonbury Festival, 2013
- Festival des Musiques Métisses. Angoulême, 2014
- Festival Banlieues Bleues. Aubervilliers, 2014
- Small World Music Festival. Toronto, 2015
- Lotus World Music and Arts Festival. Bloomington, 2015
- Coastal Jazz Festival. Vancouver, 2015/2016
- WOMADelaide. Adelaide, 2016

=== Life Happens ===
In early 2013, Rada released an EP, Life Happens with four of her songs. The album was positively received by critics, who describe her music as "cross-cultural sound that is a deep reflection of the Israeli born Ethiopian's heritage" and "graceful composition of Ethio-Jazz, funk, soul and r&b, with mixed undertones of black grooves". BBC called this album her debut, highlighting her "powerful, soulful voice and seductive combination of Ethiopian Jazz, funk and R&B".

=== Ester Rada ===
On February 9, 2014, her first full album, Ester Rada, was published. The album was very well received by the critics and the public. In addition to the singles already included in her EP, the album included three singles – No More, Sorries and Nanu Nay; the first two became hits on the Israeli radio stations and Nanu Nay reached number seven for a few weeks on the charts, becoming the first song in amharic to be in the top 10 of the Israeli radio charts.

In May 2014, she sang at the Torch-lighting ceremony on Mount Herzl held as part of the Israel Independence Day celebrations.

In early 2015, Rada signed a contract with the label Discograph (belonging to Harmonia Mundi), for the distribution of her Ester Rada album across Europe.

== Filmography and TV appearances ==
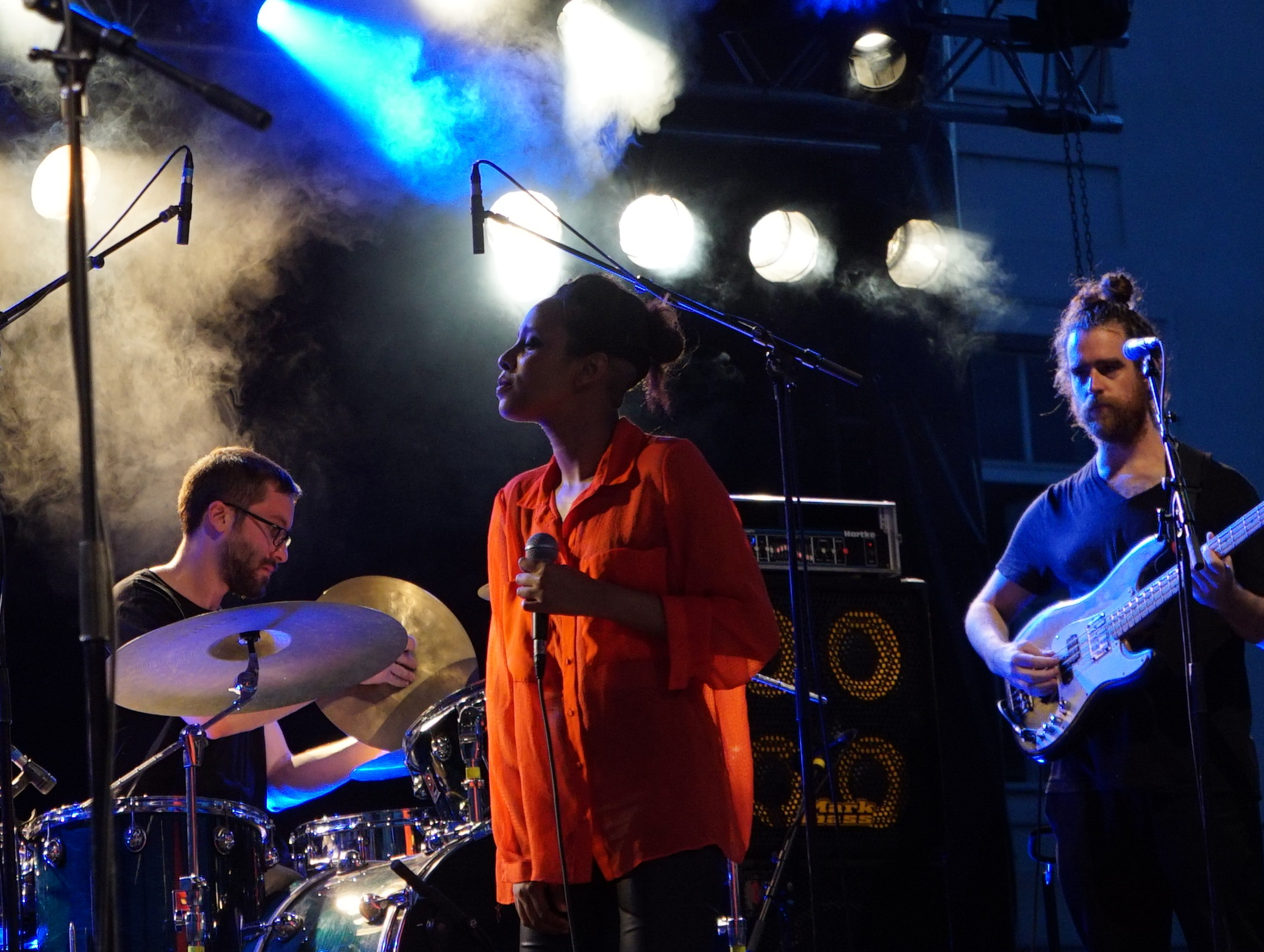
2015, Châlons-en-Champagne

- Od ani holeh (2010)
- Zrubavel
- Kirot
- The Special
- Yes's series New York
- Haganenet (2014)
- Eshet HaShagrir (2016)

== Discography ==
=== Studio albums ===
- Ester Rada (2014)
- Different eyes (2017)
- Chesed (2020)
- ZION (2025)

=== EPs ===
- Life Happens (2013)
- I Wish (2015)
- Lady (2019)

== Nominations and awards ==
Award	Category	Recipient	Result
2013 MTV Europe Music Award	Best Israeli Act	The Ultras	Nominated
