= Nadav Lapid =

Israeli screenwriter and film director

- נדב לפיד
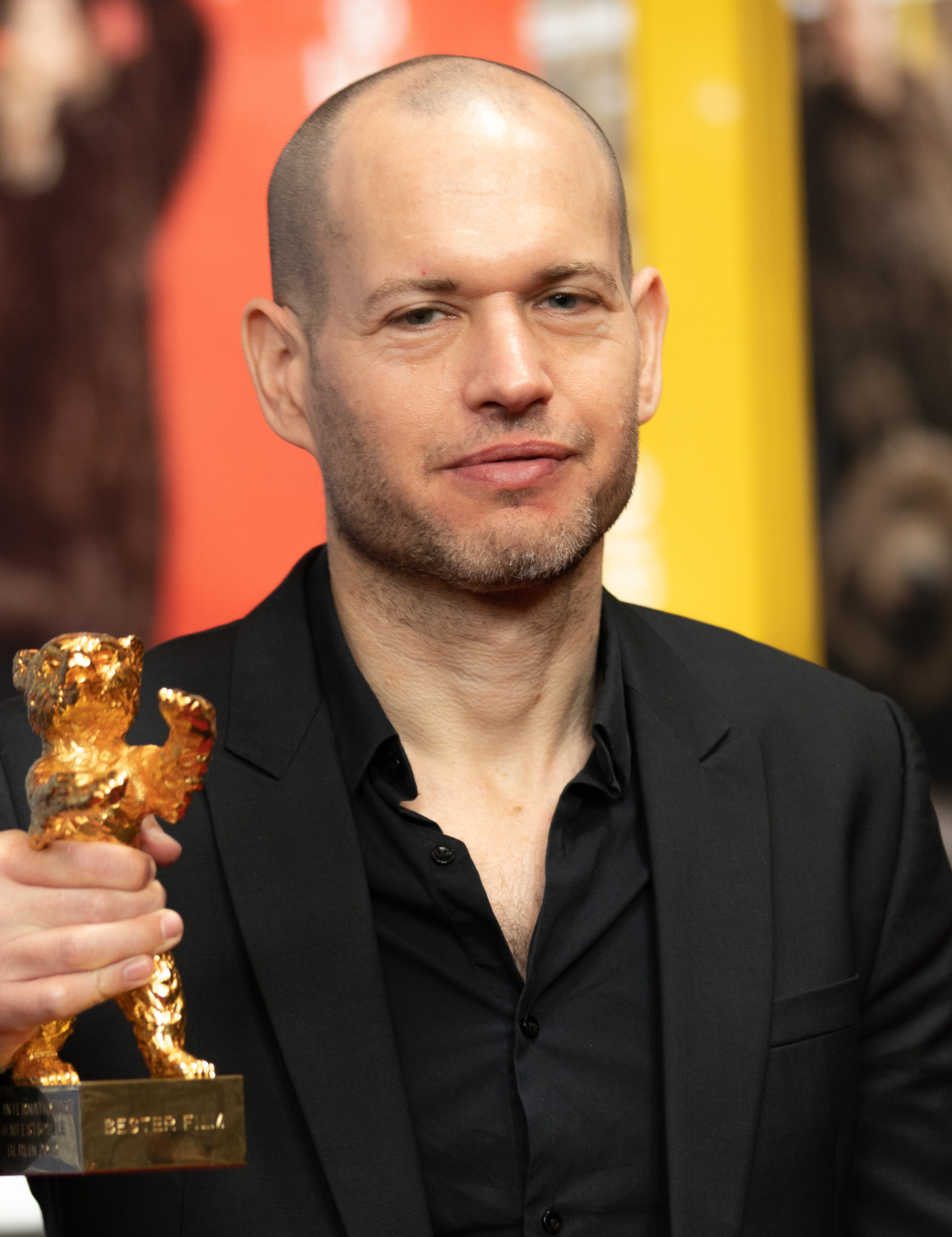
- Lapid in 2019
- Born: 8 April 1975 (age 51); Tel Aviv, Israel
- Education: Tel Aviv University; Paris 8 University; Sam Spiegel Film and Television School
- Occupation: Filmmaker
- Spouse: Naama Preis
- Children: 1

Nadav Lapid (Hebrew: נדב לפיד, born 8 April 1975) is an Israeli filmmaker. His films usually involve strong criticism of Israeli nationalism and identity in the 21st century.

He is most known for his autobiographical films Synonyms (2019) and Ahed's Knee (2021). Film critics consider him to be one of the most acclaimed Israeli filmmakers.

== Early life ==
Lapid was born in Tel Aviv, Israel, to a family of Ashkenazi Jewish descent. He is the son of writer Haim Lapid and film editor Era Lapid. He studied philosophy at Tel Aviv University, moving to Paris after his compulsory military service in the Israel Defense Forces. He returned to Israel to pursue a degree at the Sam Spiegel Film and Television School in Jerusalem.

== Career ==
=== 2010s ===
Lapid's debut feature film Policeman (2011) won the Special Jury Prize at the 64th Locarno Film Festival. It follows an Israeli counter-terrorism (Shin Bet) unit during a hostage crisis. It received positive reviews, cementing his career.

His drama film The Kindergarten Teacher (2014) premiered at the Critics' Week section of the 2014 Cannes Film Festival. It won the IFFI Best Director Award for the film at the 45th International Film Festival of India in November 2014. It received positive reviews. An English-language remake was produced in 2018, starring Maggie Gyllenhaal.

In 2016, Lapid was a member of the jury of the Critics' Week of the 69th Cannes Film Festival. In 2019, he became a recipient of the Chevalier des Arts et des Lettres.

Synonyms (2019) premiered at the 69th Berlin International Film Festival and won the Golden Bear. A satirical autobiography, it follows an Israeli expatriate living in Paris, trying to distance himself from his Israeli identity. It became Lapid's most acclaimed work to date.

=== 2020s ===
Lapid's autobiographical film Ahed's Knee (2021) premiered at the 74th Cannes Film Festival, where it won the Jury Prize. It marked his first entry in the main competition of the festival. It follows an Israeli filmmaker traveling back to his home-country to produce a new film about Israeli–Palestinian conflict, but is invited to a screening of one of his early films in a government institution.

In November 2022, Lapid was invited to head the jury at the 53rd International Film Festival of India (IFFI) in Goa. Assessing the fifteen entries in a closing speech, he, on the behalf of the jury, singled out The Kashmir Files for pointed criticism: it was "vulgar propaganda", he said, and an "inappropriate [submission]", which had shocked his fellow jury members. Lapid's remarks gave rise to a controversy in Indian politics, drawing backlash from the supporters and the members of the Bharatiya Janata Party, which had promoted the film, but receiving support from political opposition. Naor Gilon, Israel's ambassador to India castigated Lapid over Twitter, finding his remarks presumptuous and insensitive; other diplomats from Israel supported Gilon. In subsequent interviews, Lapid stood by his remarks; his fellow jurors – except Sudipto Sen – endorsed his observations in a joint statement.

Lapid's satirical film Yes (2025) premiered to critical acclaim at the Directors' Fortnight section of the 2025 Cannes Film Festival. As a vocal critic of Israeli artistic society during the Gaza war and the country's strong support of the ongoing violence, Lapid stated, "For years, I’ve dreamed of liberating myself from this Israeli prison". The film was also screened at the 2025 Jerusalem Film Festival, but was not released theatrically in Israel.

During the 2026 FID Marseille International Film Festival a boycott was called against Lapid, over the fact that Yes had received some funding from the Israel Film Fund, even though the fund often finances Palestinian political films and is openly criticized by the Israeli far-right. The boycott generated controversy throughout Europe. Natalie Portman, Justine Triet and Jacques Audiard were among 350 film industry figures (mainly from the French film industry) who signed an open letter condemning the boycott. Lapid withdrew from the festival, and a special screening of Policeman (2011) was canceled. He later expressed dissatisfaction with the open campaign against him since the release of Yes.

=== Style ===
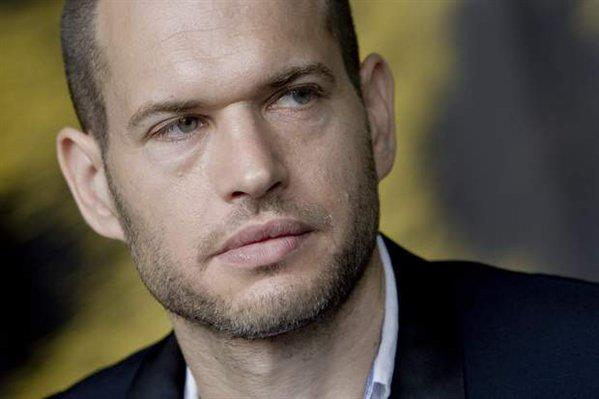
Lapid in 2011

Lapid is considered by the film critics to be among the most acclaimed filmmakers from Israel. He has gained reputation for "thematically and formally challenging work". His work frequently involves strong and blatant criticism of Israeli nationalism and identity.

Commenting on the reception of his work, he stated that "we need someone to be in the opposition, to upset the power structure of cinema, to want to lock horns with it".

== Personal life ==
Lapid is married to Israeli actress Naama Preis, with whom he had one child.

=== Political views ===
Lapid lives in self-exile in Paris since 2021. He is a vocal critic of the Israeli government.

In December 2023, alongside 50 other filmmakers, Lapid signed an open letter published in the French newspaper Libération demanding an immediate ceasefire and an end to the killing of civilians following the Israeli invasion of the Gaza Strip, and calling for a humanitarian corridor into Gaza to be established for humanitarian aid, along with the release of hostages.

== Filmography ==
=== Feature films ===
Year	English title	Original title	Notes
2011	Policeman	השוטר	
2014	The Kindergarten Teacher	הגננת	
2019	Synonyms	מילים נרדפות	Golden Bear winner at the 69th Berlin International Film Festival
2021	Ahed's Knee	הַבֶּרֶךְ	Jury Prize winner at the 2021 Cannes Film Festival
2025	Yes	כן!	

=== Short films ===
- Road (2005)
- Emile's Girlfriend (2006)
- Ammunition Hill (features in Footsteps in Jerusalem) (2013)
- Why (2015)
- Diary of a Wedding Photographer (2016)
