= The Ran Quadruplets =

Israeli drama television series

The Ran Quadruplets (Hebrew: רביעיית רן, transliteration: Reviat Ran) is an Israeli television drama series that shows the fictional story of the first quadruplets born in Israel. The series depicts the relationship between the brothers updated every eight years, and finally when they are at the age of 32, through the project of a documentary television reporter.

The series is a combination of a drama series and a documentary (mockumentary), and was inspired by a 1964 British series of documentary films with the title Up Series by director Michael Apted.
