= The Kindergarten Teacher (2014 film) =

2014 Israeli film

- Haganenet, הגננת
- Directed by: Nadav Lapid
- Written by: Nadav Lapid
- Produced by: Talia Kleinhendler; Osnat Handelsman-Keren; Carole Scotta
- Starring: Sarit Larry; Avi Schnaidman; Lior Raz; Hamuchtar; Ester Rada; Guy Oren; Yehezkel Lazarov; Dan Toren
- Cinematography: Shai Goldman
- Edited by: Era Lapid
- Music by: Michael Emet
- Production companies: Pie Films; Haut et Court
- Release date: May 2014 (Cannes)
- Running time: 119 minutes
- Countries: Israel; France
- Language: Hebrew

The Kindergarten Teacher (Hebrew: הגננת) is a 2014 film by Israeli writer and film director Nadav Lapid.

== Plot ==
Yoav is a precocious young boy who occasionally announces "I have a poem", which he then recites. His nanny Miri writes the poems down as he recites them and has used some as texts she delivers when auditioning for acting roles. Yoav's kindergarten teacher Nira is transfixed by Yoav's poems and his preternatural talent. She presents Yoav's poems as her own work in her poetry class and earns new appreciation from her teacher, Oded.

Nira wants to preserve Yoav's poems and nurture his talent. Knowing the boy's mother is not present in his life, she manages to contact his father Amnon, a very successful restaurateur, but he dismisses the poetry as unfit for contemporary life.

Oded arranges for Nira to read some of her poems at an evening group event. Without his father's permission, she brings Yoav to recite his poems instead. He is not taken seriously and cruelly mocked by the audience. Oded informs Amnon, who withdraws his son from Nira's school and threatens her against trying to establish contact with Yoav.

Nira plots to emigrate to Canada with Yoav and kidnaps him, without resistance, from his new school. When Yoav reports his own abduction to the police, Nira helps him direct the police to their location. She is arrested and Yoav is taken away in the arms of a young policewoman.

== Cast ==
- Sarit Larry as Nira, a kindergarten teacher
- Avi Schnaidman as Yoav, one of her students
- Lior Raz as Nira's husband
- Hamuchtar, as Oded, Nira's poetry teacher
- Ester Rada as Miri, Yoav's nanny
- Guy Oren as Asi, Yoav's friend and classmate
- Yehezkel Lazarov as Amnon, Yoav's father
- Dan Toren as Aharon, Yoav's uncle

== Reception ==
On review aggregator website Rotten Tomatoes, 77% of 35 critic reviews of the film are positive, with the average rating of 6.6/10. The site's critical consensus reads, "The Kindergarten Teacher's crypticness can needlessly feel like homework, but Nadav Lapid's provocative direction and committed performances give this tale of mentorship and possession a disquieting sting". On Metacritic, the film has the weighted average score of 68 out of 100 based on 12 critic reviews, indicating "generally favorable reviews".

The New York Times called it, "self-assured, remarkably powerful".

== Accolades ==
The Kindergarten Teacher won the $20,000 prize for new talent at the Taipei Film Festival. Lead actress Sarit Larry received the IFFI Best Actor Award (Female): Silver Peacock Award at the 45th International Film Festival of India.

== Remake ==
The film was remade in 2018 as the English-language film The Kindergarten Teacher.
