= Jewish commonwealth =

Jewish commonwealth is a phrase that typically refers to one of three periods:

- Ancient Israel and Judah (c. 1047–586 BCE), First Jewish Commonwealth
- Second Temple period (c. 516 BCE – 70 CE), Second Jewish Commonwealth
- State of Israel (1948 CE–present)
  - Biltmore Conference, a 1942 Zionist conference demanding Palestine's establishment as a Jewish commonwealth

== See also ==
- American Zion Commonwealth
- List of Jewish states and dynasties
- History of the Jews and Judaism in the Land of Israel
