= Avraham Abutbul =

Israeli actor and singer (1961–2012)

- אברהם אבוטבול
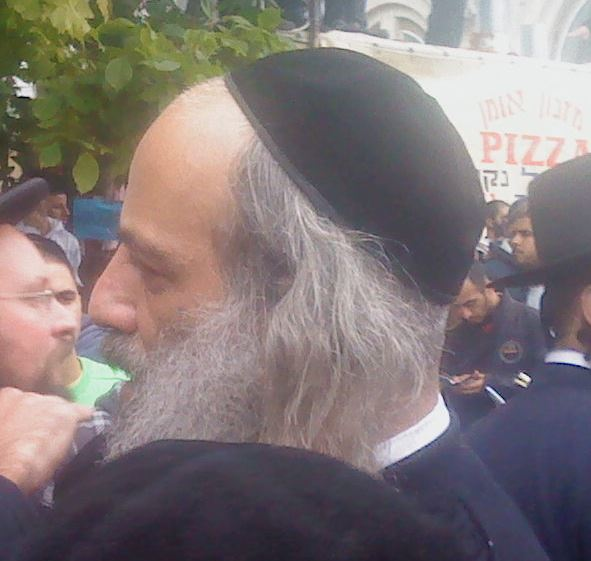
- Abutbul in 2010
- Born: 2 January 1961; Kiryat Ata, Israel
- Died: 11 October 2012 (aged 51); Jerusalem, Israel
- Other name: Avraham Abutboul
- Occupations: Actor; singer
- Years active: 1986–2012
- Relatives: Alon Abutbul (brother)

Avraham Abutbul (Hebrew: אברהם אבוטבול; 2 January 1961 – 11 October 2012) was an Israeli actor and singer.

== Biography ==
=== Early life ===
Abutbul was born in Kiryat Ata, Israel, to a Mizrahi Jewish family from Egypt and Algeria. When he was 17 years old, he moved to Jerusalem and attended the yeshiva Ohr Somayach, which he later left when he abandoned Orthodox Judaism. In 1998, he returned to Orthodox Judaism.

=== Acting career ===
Abutbul made his film debut in the 1986 film Every Time We Say Goodbye starring Tom Hanks. His most prominent film appearance in the 2004 film Ushpizin in which he portrayed Ben Baruch and in the 1990 film Front Window. He made his earliest television appearance in 1997 and he also appeared in the 2004 suspense series Pillars of Smoke (Timrot Ashan).

=== Music career ===
In 1995, Abutbul recorded his debut album. Many of his music was centred around his religious beliefs and he made numerous film and music collaborations with Shuli Rand and the band Izabo including fellow musicians Tamir Muskat and Ronit Shahar. He recorded four studio albums and his last one was released posthumously.

=== Personal life ===
Abutbul was the older brother of actor Alon Abutbul and appeared in several films with him. He also had four children with a woman whom he divorced in the 1990s and remarried several days before his death.

Abutbul was a devout follower of Hasidic Judaism and he has portrayed many characters in films who worship the same religion.

== Death ==
In 2012, a tumor was discovered in Abutbul's brain. He had surgery to remove it but the tumor was metastasic and the cancer spread around his body. He spent his final moments in the Hadassah Ein Karem Hospital where he died on October 11 at the age of 51.

Abutbul was interred at Mount of Olives Jewish Cemetery.
