= Love at Second Sight =

Love at Second Sight may refer to:

- Love at Second Sight (1934 film), a British film
- Love at Second Sight (1999 film), an Israeli film (Hebrew title: אהבה ממבט שני, romanized as Ahava Mimabat Sheni)
- Love at Second Sight (2014 film), a multi-part Chinese TV film (Chinese title: 一見不鍾情; pinyin: Yi Jian Bu Zhong Qing)
- Love at Second Sight (2019 film), a French film (French title: Mon inconnue)
