= Oded Liphshitz =

Israeli playwright

- עודד ליפשיץ
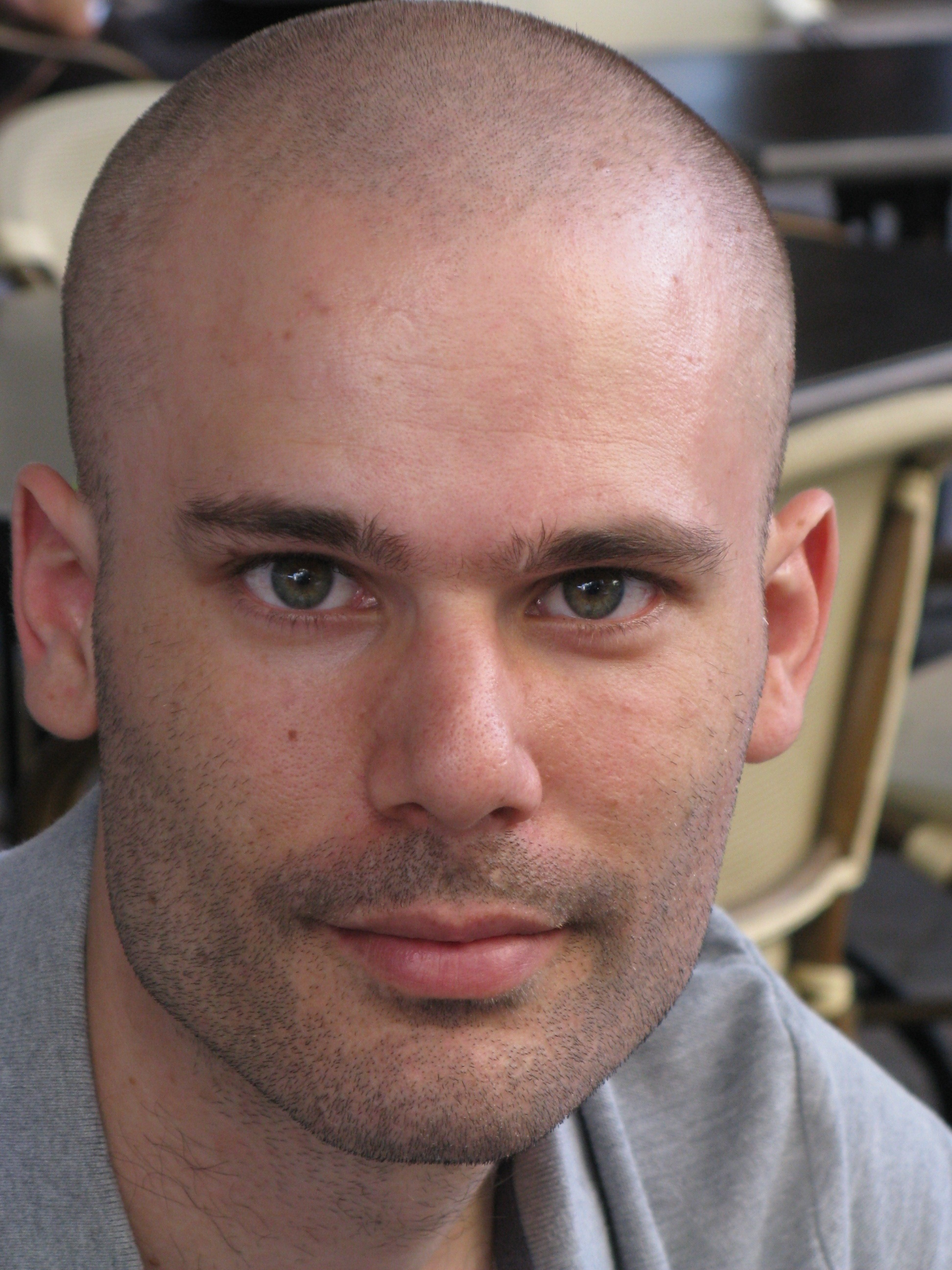
- Born: 1981 (age 44–45); Kiryat Ata, Israel
- Occupation: Playwright
- Notable work: Albert, The Light Turns Up On Me
- Website: https://odedliphshitzplays.com

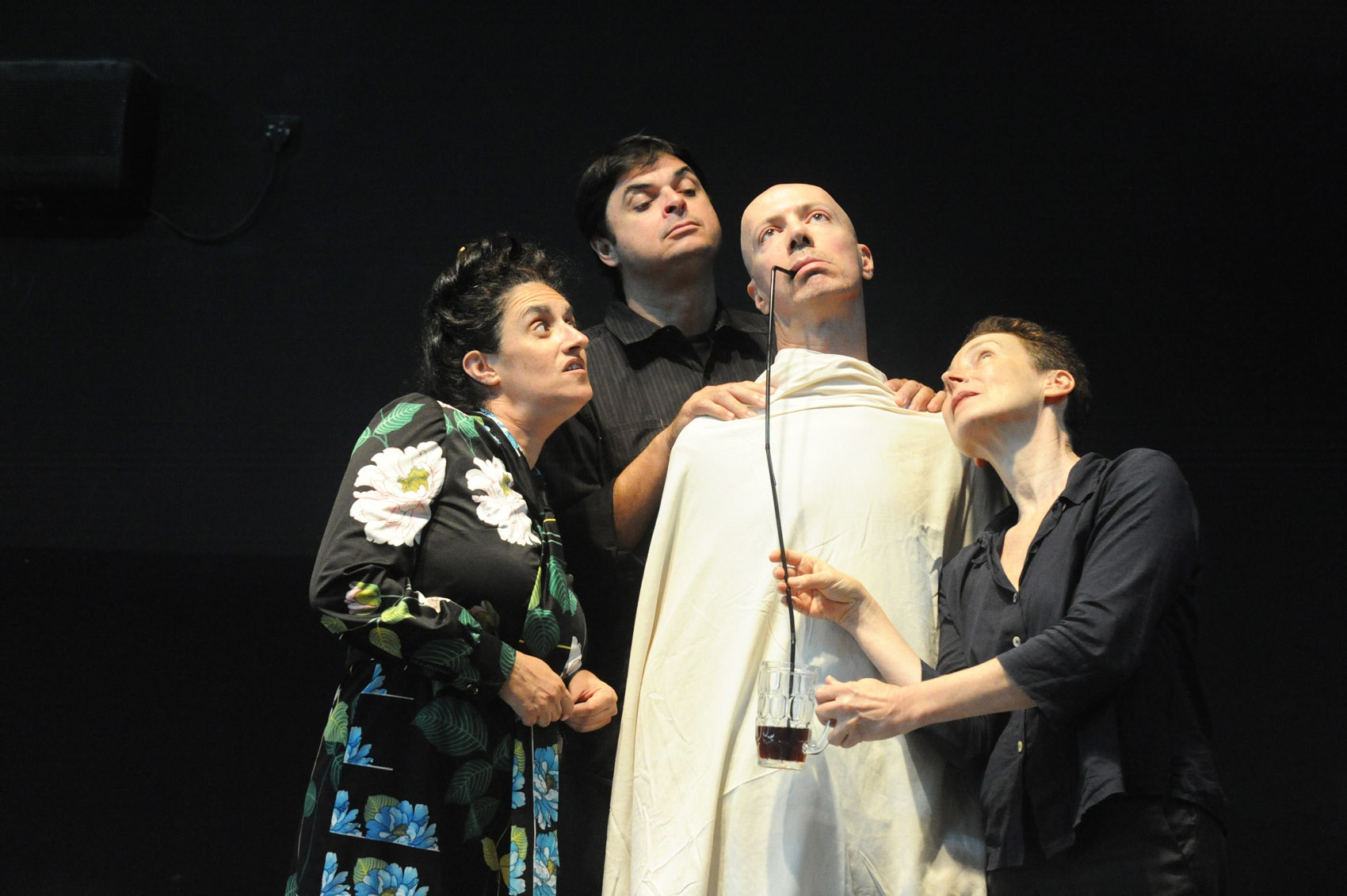
Kigler

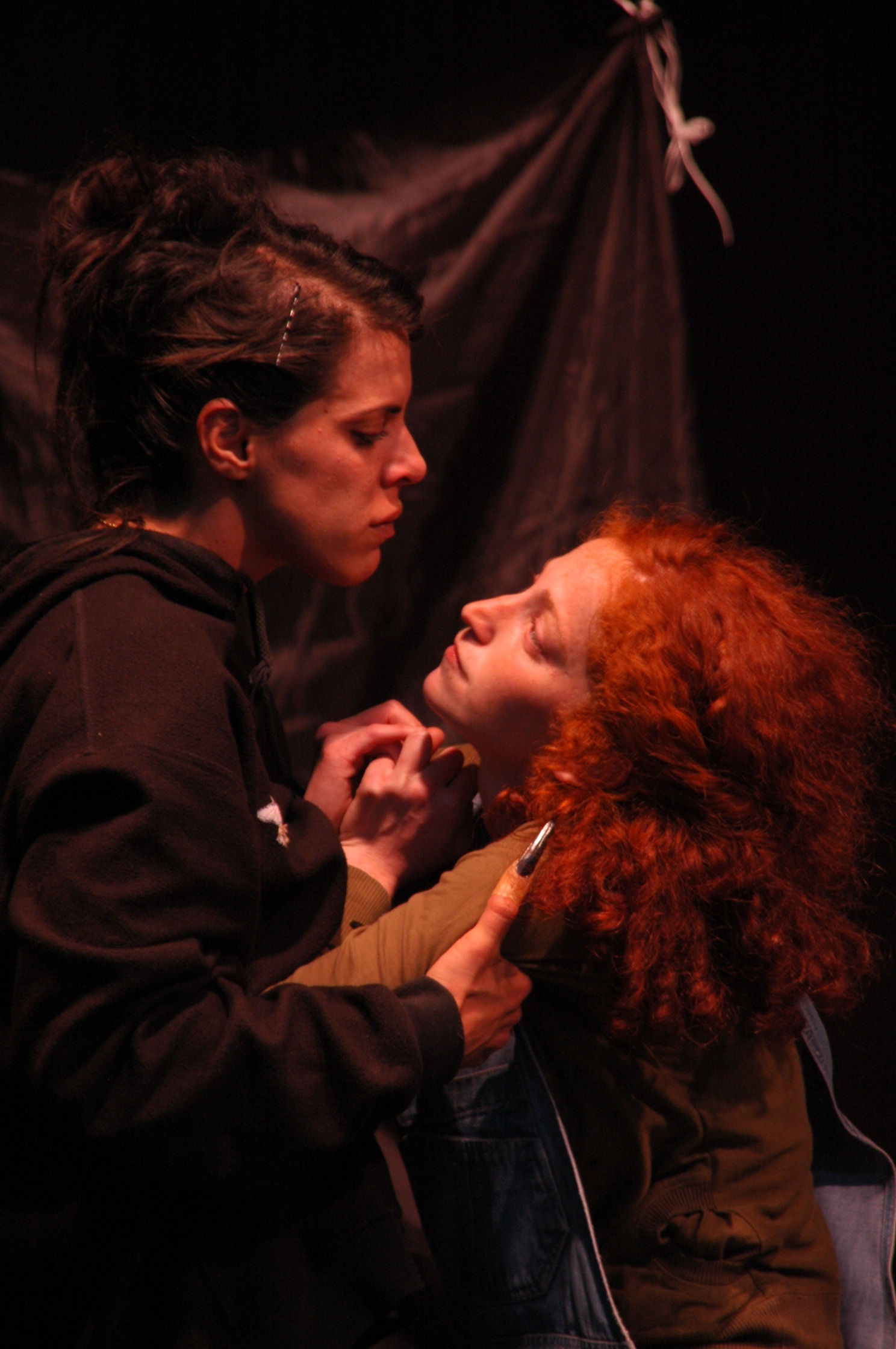
The Girl Who Is Actually a Wheelbarrow

Oded Liphshitz (Hebrew: עודד ליפשיץ) is an Israeli playwright.

He was born in Kiryat Ata, Israel, in 1981, and currently lives in Tel Aviv and teaches in the theatre department of Tel Aviv University. His play Albert received the Bernstein prize for literature 2012. His play The Light Turns Up On Me has won Beit lessin's Open stage 1st Award 2010 along with Heidelberg's stage market 2010 special award. Liphshitz' plays have been produced in Israel and abroad. He was marked on several occasions by critics and scholars as one of the prominent voices of Israeli young generation of playwrights.
