= Shtei Etzbaot MiTzidon =

1986 Israeli film by Eli Cohen

- Israeli poster of the film
- שתי אצבעות מצידון
- Directed by: Eli Cohen
- Written by: Eli Cohen; Baruch Nevo; Tzvika Kertzner
- Produced by: Eli Dori
- Starring: Roni Pinkovitch; Shaul Mizrahi; Alon Abutbul; Dudu Ben Ze'ev; Boaz Ofri; Nazzy Rabach; Ossi Hillel
- Cinematography: Yehiel Ne'eman
- Edited by: Avigdor Weil
- Music by: Beni Nagari
- Production company: IDF Spokesperson's Unit
- Distributed by: Marathon Films
- Release dates: 16 May 1986 (Cannes); 8 August 1986 (Israel)
- Running time: 91 minutes
- Countries: Israel, Lebanon
- Languages: Hebrew, Arabic
- Budget: $80,000

Shtei Etzbaot MiTzidon (Hebrew: שתי אצבעות מצידון, lit. 'Two Fingers from Sidon'), released internationally as Ricochets, is a 1986 Israeli war film directed by Eli Cohen. The film follows a platoon of soldiers during the 1982 Lebanon War. It was produced by the film production department of the IDF Spokesperson's Unit.

It was Israel's representative in the 1986 Cannes Film Festival in the Un Certain Regard section of the festival, which is where it was first released before receiving a wider release in Israel in August 1986. Critical reception of the film was mixed, with negative reviews alleging that it could be described as a propaganda film, whereas positive reviews praised the performances of the main cast, while questioning its neutrality on the war.

It was also brought up by the Foreign Affairs and Defense Committee prior to its Israeli release, over questions on whether a commercial film of its nature should be produced by the Israel Defense Forces directly.

== Plot ==
A platoon of Israeli soldiers in southern Lebanon, all in B Company, is ambushed by a group of militants. During the ambush, the platoon's leader, Boaz, is killed.

Meanwhile, Gadi Lehrman, a lieutenant from the Golani Brigade, graduates from the IDF Officers' School and is assigned to be Boaz's successor as platoon leader of B Company. His parents wish him good luck as he leaves for Lebanon.

Arriving via helicopter, he meets one of the operations officers, Miki, and is then introduced to the rest of the platoon, who are suffering from morale problems due to Boaz's recent death. The platoon is made up of Tuvia, the company commander, Georgie, a trigger-happy soldier, Bambino, the machine gunner, Effi, the combat support soldier, who has a crush on Genya, one of the Lebanese girls in the nearby village, and Rauf, a Druze sergeant who is the most experienced member of the platoon.

Gadi then begins to oversee the platoon's activities in Lebanon, having to deal with both his own soldiers' problems, such as their negative attitude towards the local civilians, as well as the ethnic tensions in the area.

One of the first activities results in the discovery of the bodies of two Lebanese civilians, one of whom was killed for giving an interview to British television stations. The platoon believes this to be the work of Abu Nabil, the same Lebanese militant who killed Boaz. The family of the victims claims that Abu Nabil was told to do so by Hajj Ismail, who attempts to blackmail the platoon by threatening to reveal what they've done to the UN, the Red Cross and American television stations.

Afterwards, a soldier named Maimon, much to Rauf's dismay, stops to search a Druze vehicle. Rauf informs him that the Druze family he stopped is his fiancée's family, Rauf then apologizes to them for Maimon's misconduct. Gadi asks Rauf if his fiancée lives nearby, to which Rauf confirms that his fiancée lives in the village near their camp, and also confirms it as the reason why he signed on for another tour of duty.

Later, at night, the camp is ambushed by a group of militants. During the ambush, Georgie suffers a nervous breakdown, which Gadi attempts to explain as being caused by a "misidentified target".

A band comes to perform a song for the platoon, but a power outage prevents them from doing so. Effi goes up to the stage to sing the film's theme song, "Shtei Etzbaot MiTzidon".

Then, the platoon raids a house to check if they're smuggling weapons to militants. During the raid, it is discovered that Genya, the Lebanese girl that Effi has a crush on, is helping her family smuggle weapons to militants in the house's basement. The next day, Gadi receives a letter meant for Rauf and tries to get Bambino to deliver it to him but Bambino is dumbfounded as to where Rauf could be. Gadi then tries to get this information out of Georgie but after he fails to give any proper answers, Gadi questions the platoon on Rauf's whereabouts. Bambino tells him that ever since the platoon retreated from the Chouf District, Rauf has been visiting his fiancée, who lives there.

Meanwhile, during Rauf's visit, his fiancée's father asks him where his loyalties lie, to which Rauf replies that his loyalties lie with the IDF and he would seek peace. The next day, Rauf's body is discovered, to the shock of the entire platoon, who are unsure as to who killed him.

Due to Rauf's recent death, the platoon performs a raid on the village, much to Hajj Ismail's dismay.

Later, in another routine activity, the platoon fires at what they thought was a militant but then discovers is actually one of the kids from the village nearby, who Bambino had interacted with days earlier. The platoon is completely shocked by this, and Bambino in particular has a nervous breakdown of his own.

The platoon then recruits Hajj Ismail's help in raiding the village, and Ismail agrees, much to the villagers' ire.

In the film's climax, B Company raids Abu Nabil's house, and while Abu Nabil is killed in the raid, Gadi himself is badly wounded but survives. During B Company's last day in Lebanon, an M113 APC gets stuck in mud, so Tuvia requests a new cable to pull the APC out. An Israeli reporter asks Tuvia how he feels now that the war is over, and he replies that he feels a lot of relief. In the hospital, Gadi, along with Miki beside him, watches the soldiers of B Company sing a song about him. The film ends with them finally leaving Lebanon.

== Cast ==
Cast taken from EDb.

- Roni Pinkovitch as Gadi, the platoon leader.
- Shaul Mizrahi as Tuvia, the company commander.
- Alon Abutbul as Georgie, the rocket launcher soldier.
- Dudu Ben Ze'ev as Bambino, the machine-gunner.
- Boaz Ofri as Effi, the combat support soldier.
- Nazzy Rabach as Rauf, the Druze sergeant of the platoon.
- Ossi Hillel as Miki, the operations officer.
- Hasson Wahba as Hajj Ismail.
- Maxi Bloom as the battalion commander.
- Ana Chen as Gania
- Micha Shagrir as Gadi's father.
- Ido Hezekiah as the Lebanese boy.
- Eldad Refaeli as Boaz, the previous platoon leader.
- Yoram Eshkol as Shimon, the operations officer.
- Angel Shakhani as Rauf's fiancée.
- Rafi Osman as Osman the mechanic.
- Yael Shoham as Gadi's mother.
- Shaul Mofaz as himself (uncredited cameo).
- Yitzhak Mordechai as himself (uncredited cameo).

== Production ==
=== Pre-production ===
Shtei Etzbaot MiTzidon first began conceptualization at the start of the 1982 Lebanon War as an instructional film. Eli Cohen, the film's director, was serving his reserve duty in the IDF Spokesperson's Unit at the time. Cohen had a conversation with an officer in the unit, Yaacov Even, during which Even brought up his concern over the morale of soldiers in the area. This inspired Cohen to pitch a film to Eli Dori, the head of the filming department of the unit, who approved of the idea. Afterwards, Cohen invited Dr. Baruch Nevo and Tzvika Kertzner to help with writing the film's screenplay. Initially, the film was meant to be an instructional film and was not intended for a commercial release. Because it was produced by the IDF directly, the film could not afford to have civilian actors. Due to this, most of the actors cast for the film were soldiers serving in the IDF, and thus, they were not paid at all for their involvement in the film.

=== Shooting ===
The film was shot at Al-Khiyam during the last stages of the IDF's withdrawal from the country in 1985. During filming, the cast of the film underwent training to enhance the realism of the film. Residents of the village participated in the film as uncredited extras. Soldiers from the Golani Brigade were also present at the film's shooting for security purposes.

=== Music ===
The film's soundtrack was composed by Beni Nagari and includes the theme song of the film "Shtei Etzbaot MiTzidon", with lyrics written by Cohen himself (under the pseudonym of Eli Madursky), performed in the film by Boaz Ofri. The lyrics were based on a letter that a soldier named Mickey Berkovich wrote to Cohen in January 1985.

== Release and reception ==
=== Initial showings ===
Due to it being intended as an instructional film, Shtei Etzbaot MiTzidon was first screened at the IDF Officers' School, where it was received positively. Shish Koller, who was present at the early screenings, offered to have the film distributed commercially for $80,000 and to send it as Israel's representative at the Cannes Film Festival.

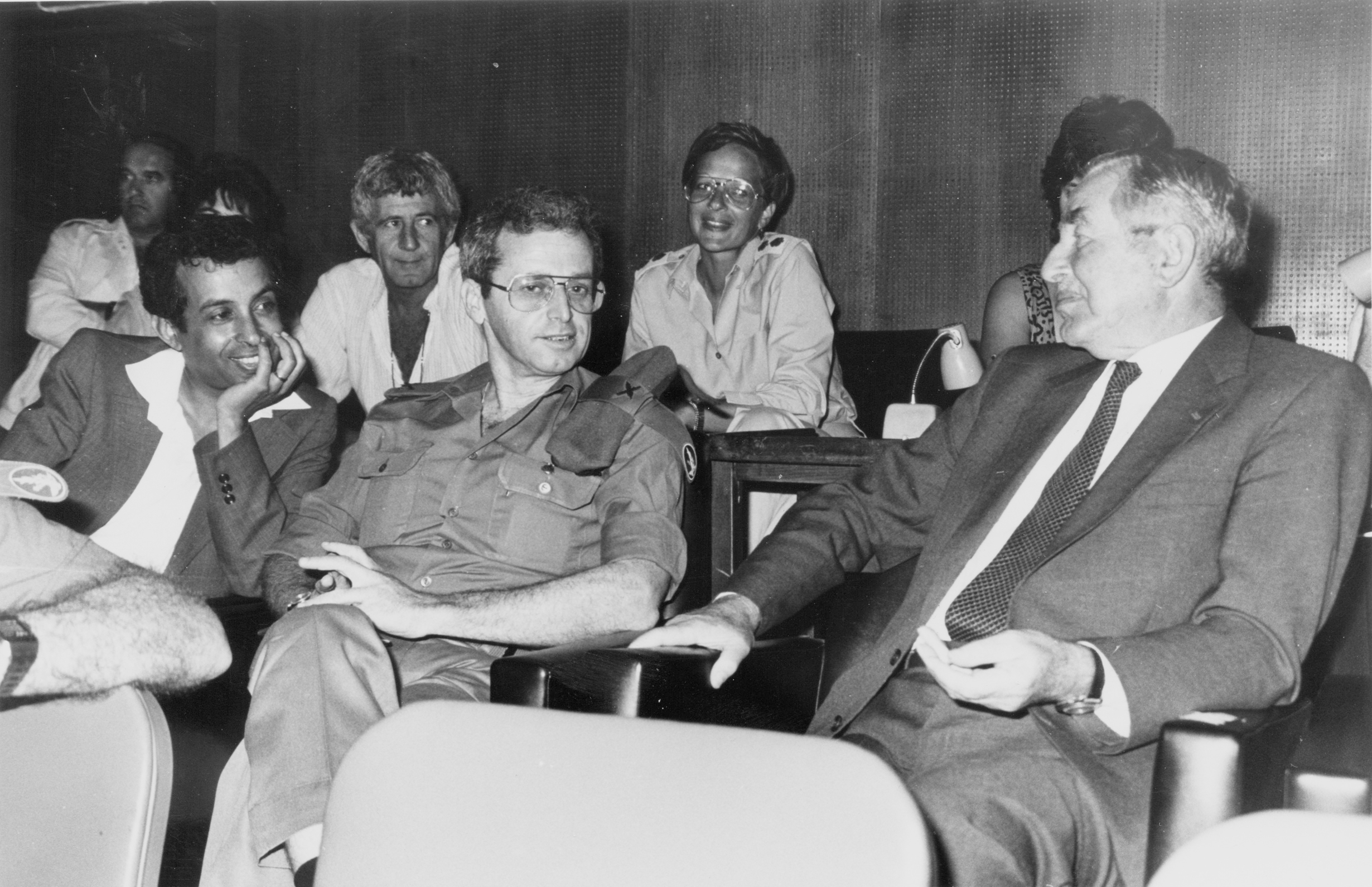
Chaim Herzog, the then-President of Israel, at an early showing of the film.

Shtei Etzbaot MiTzidon first premiered commercially at the 1986 Cannes Film Festival under the English title of Ricochets in the Un Certain Regard section of the festival in May 1986. Its reception at the festival was positive, though it did not receive any awards at the festival. Reception from Arab journalists was mixed; Egyptian journalist Rauf Taufik labelled the film propaganda, whereas Anis Mansour questioned Cohen privately on how the IDF approved of it.

Later in June, the Foreign Affairs and Defense Committee convened over the film regarding its purpose and whether a commercial film of its nature should be produced by the IDF directly. Two Druze citizens from Kisra-Sumei filed a complaint to prevent the film's release in Israel. Early screenings of the film in Israel included a screening in the Knesset. It received a wide release on August 8, 1986.

=== Critical reception and commercial performance ===
Reviews of the film were mixed. Negative reviews of the film considered the film kitschy and little more than propaganda; in particular, negative reviews highlighted the negative depiction of Lebanese civilians in the film. Positive reviews of the film praised the performances of the main cast but still questioned the neutrality of the film over the justification of the war.

Despite the mixed reception, the film sold over 900,000 tickets and became one of the most commercially successful Israeli films of all time.

The film also received international attention, including being featured on 60 Minutes as part of a larger section about the war featuring an interview with Eli Geva.

==== Awards ====
The film earned the IDF Spokesperson's Unit the Yitzhak Sadeh Prize.

The film won four Silver Menorah Awards in 1988: Best Picture, Best Director (Eli Cohen), Best Cinematographer (Yehiel Ne'eman), and Best Supporting Actor (Alon Abutbul).

=== Legal issues ===
Shish Koller appealed to Supreme Court of Israel against the selection of Avanti Popolo as Israel's submission for the Academy Award for Best International Feature Film at the 59th Academy Awards, in the hopes that Shtei Etzbaot MiTzidon would be selected instead. The appeal was rejected on the grounds that it was not the Supreme Court's responsibility whether a film gets selected or not. Avanti Popolo remained the submission for the Academy Awards, where it ultimately did not get selected as a nominee.

In February 1987, the main cast of the film also filed for legal action due to their lack of pay for their involvement in the film.

Later, in December 1987, Koller again filed for legal action to prevent the film's broadcasting on Channel 1, on the grounds that the film's distribution contract did not include broadcasting rights. This followed up on a previous round of legal disputes between Koller and the Ministry of Defense over Koller's role as the film's distributor.
