= Erez Lev Ari =

Israeli singer-songwriter

Erez Lev Ari ארז לב ארי
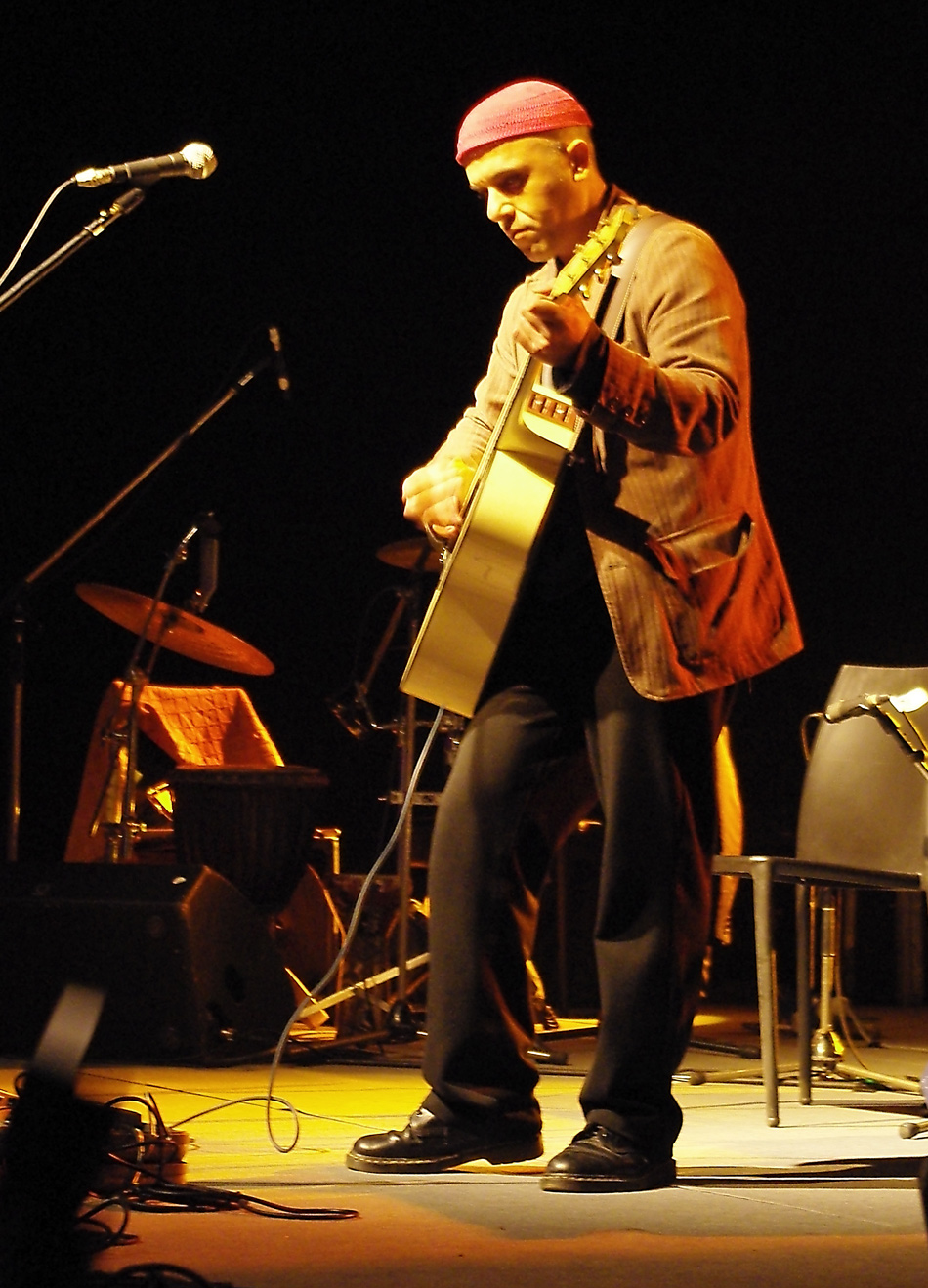
- Erez Lev Ari

Background information
- Born: Erez Ezerzer; 16 August 1970 (age 56)
- Origin: Kiryat Ata, Israel
- Genres: Israeli rock; Jewish music
- Occupation: Singer-songwriter
- Instruments: Vocals; Guitar
- Years active: 1996–present
- Label: NMC

Erez Lev Ari (Hebrew: ארז לב ארי; born 16 August 1970) is an Israeli singer-songwriter. His music often incorporates Jewish teachings and themes.

== Music career ==
In 1996 Lev Ari joined the musical group When Nico Starts Talking (כשניקו תתחיל לדבר) just before they disbanded. He went on to contribute to two albums by the band's lead singer Patrick Sabag (פטריק סבג), and played guitar on the solo albums of the band's keyboardist Eyal Kaufman (אייל_קופמן). He has collaborated with numerous other artists such as Etti Ankri, Meir Banai and Manny Beger (מני בגר).

In 2006 and 2007 he released several singles and on 4 December 2007 his first album, The Joy in Small Details (שמחת הפרטים הקטנים) was released on the Israeli record label NMC. Lev Ari produced and arranged the songs for the album, with Patrick Sabag participating in the arrangements.

In 2008 he composed, wrote and sang Ana Efnè (אנה אפנה), the opening song for the Israeli drama Srugim. The single was added to his album The Joy of Small Details and the album was re-issued. In March 2011 the album reached Gold Album status.

His second album Crimson (ארגמן) was released in 2010 preceded by the two singles Good Morning (בוקר טוב) and At the End of the Day (בסוף היום).

In 2012 he collaborated with Yoni Ganot (יוני גנוט) on the album Letter to Letter (אות לאות).

In 2013 he released a joint album with Patrick Sabag called The Lonely Tree (העץ הבודד).

In March 2016 Lev Ari released his fourth album (third solo album) The Stains of Culture (כתמים של תרבות).

On 30 May 2023, he released his fourth solo album (and sixth overall) titled "Love and Release" (לאהוב ולשחרר). Four singles were released from the album: the title track "Love and Release", followed by a live version of the single which was also included in the album, "Yehidati", and "I Don't Remember Faces" (לא זוכר פנים), featuring rapper and singer Raviv Fiddler (Ravid Plotnik). On 17 August, the song "Coat of Many Colors 2023" (כתונת פסים 2023) was released, in which he participated alongside many other Israeli artists.

== Personal life ==
Lev Ari was raised by his grandmother in Kiryat Ata, Israel and is of Moroccan and Yemeni descent. He learned to play the guitar when he was young and became known for his talent in Haifa and the Krayot Area. After completing his military service as a paratrooper he moved to Tel Aviv where he still lives with his wife Hadas and three children

== Discography ==
- 2007 – The Joy in Small Details (שמחת הפרטים הקטנים)
- 2008 – Ana Efné (אנה אפנה) – theme song for the Israeli TV series Srugim
- 2010 – Crimson (ארגמן)
- 2013 – The Lonely Tree (העץ הבודד)
- 2016 – The Stains of Culture (כתמים של תרבות)
- 2018 – The Guest (האורח)
