= Shai Abuhatsira =

Israeli public servant

- שי אבוחצירה
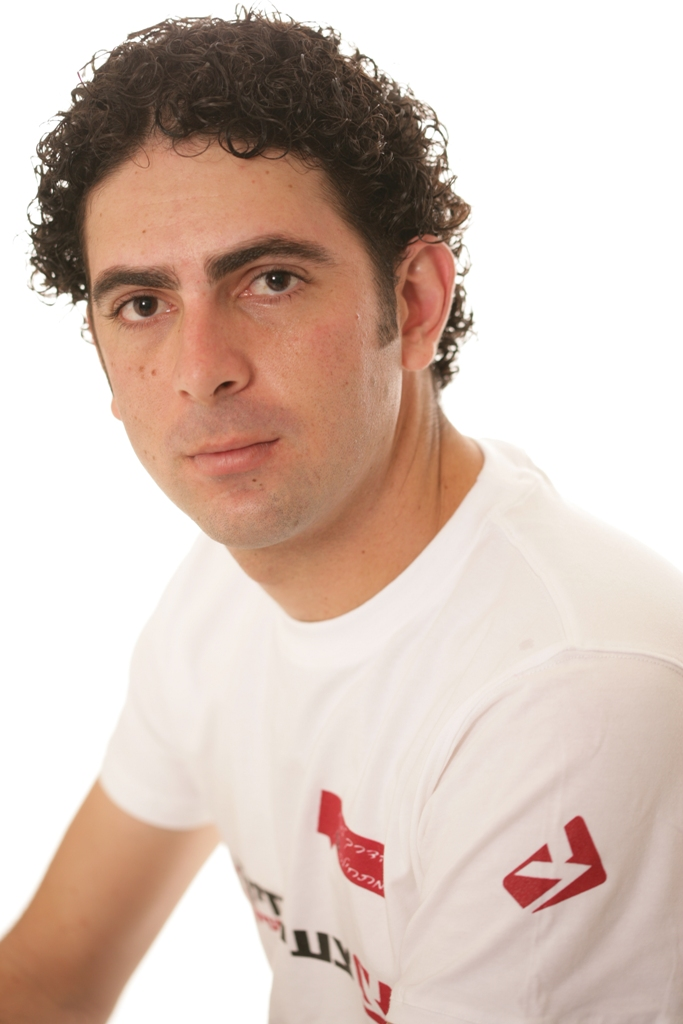
- Abuhatsira in 2008
- Born: July 19, 1980 (age 45); Kiryat Ata, Israel
- Education: University of Haifa
- Known for: Tenure as Deputy Mayor of Haifa (2011-2018)

Shai Abuhatsira (Hebrew: שי אבוחצירה; born July 19, 1980) is an Israeli public servant. He served as a deputy Mayor of Haifa between 2011 and 2018. Abuhatsira is the youngest to ever serve in this position.

== Early life ==
Abuhatsira is the son of Eliyhau and Nelly. Abuhatsira is the fourth son in his family and he has three sisters. He was born and raised in Kiryat Ata and is of Jewish Moroccan descent. He is a distant relative of Moroccan Sephardi rabbi Baba Sali. He graduated from high school at age 18 and shortly after military service, he attended the University of Haifa.

== Career ==
=== National Union of Israeli Students ===
In 2004 Abuhatsira was elected chair of the University of Haifa student union. He made comprehensive efforts and played an important part in promotion of students, environmental accessibility to disabled students and the building of the students legal and academic status. In 2006 Abuhatsira was elected deputy chair in the National Union of Israeli Students. He played an important part in the national tuition reduction campaign, which was accompanied by national strikes and student demonstrations.

=== Haifa City Council ===
During 2008, Abuhatsira and other public activists founded the Tzeirey Haifa (Hebrew: צעירי חיפה) political party, which participated in Haifa's local city elections. The party achieved success in elections and won two seats on the council. Abuhatsira became a member of the city's municipal coalition, headed Mayor Yona Yahav. He became the deputy mayor and the head of the youngsters population affairs.

Abuhatsira helped many young population initiatives and is an important supporter of city's growth development and students promotion.

== Recent Activity ==
Afikim Advanced Transport Services Ltd, Director and Board Member, since November 22, 2020.
