= Kiryat Ata =

City in the Haifa district, Israel

Kiryat Ata קריית אתא
- City (from 1969)

Hebrew transcription(s)
  - ISO 259: Qiryat ʔataˀ
  - Also spelled: Qiryat Atta (official); Kiryat Atta (unofficial); Qiryat Ata (unofficial)
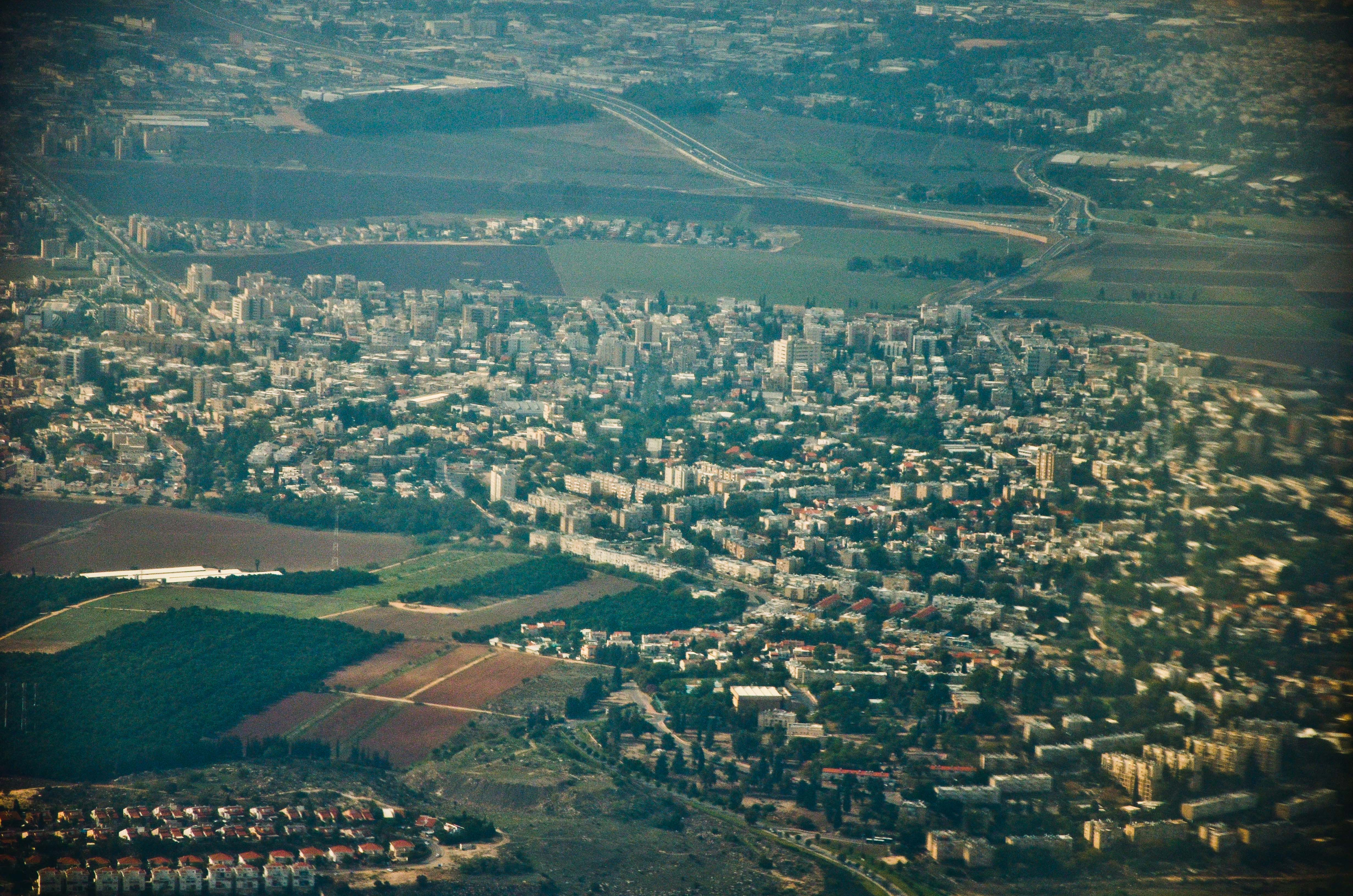
- View of Kiryat Ata

- Coat of arms

- Location within Haifa region of Israel Location within Israel
- Coordinates: 32°48′N 35°06′E
- Grid position: 160/244 PAL
- Country: Israel
- District: Haifa
- Subdistrict: Haifa

Government
  - Mayor: Yaakov Peretz

Area
  - Total: 16,706 dunams (16.706 km^{2}; 6.450 sq mi)

Population (2024)
  - Total: 62,585
  - Density: 3,746.3/km^{2} (9,702.8/sq mi)

Ethnicity
  - Jews and others: 99.7%
  - Arabs: 0.3%
- Name meaning: City of Ata

Kiryat Ata (Hebrew: קריית אתא, lit. 'City of Ata', Arabic: كريات آتا) also spelled Qiryat Ata, is a city in the Haifa District of Israel. In 2024 it had a population of 62,585, 92% of whom were Jewish citizens.

== History ==
The Early Bronze Age site at Kiryat Ata has been extensively excavated since 1990, revealing stratified remains from the Neolithic, EB (=early Bronze Age), IB and EB II periods. At Tell el ‘Idham remains from a continuous habitation from the early Bronze Age, through the Persian age down to the Roman era have been identified.

Archaeologists Mordechai Aviam and Dan Barag (1935–2009) thought it to be the Capharatha (Greek: Καφαραθ᾽) mentioned by Josephus in the Lower Galilee, one of several views tentatively identified for the site.

Rock-hewn winepresses dating to the Byzantine era have been found here. Some have had crosses and Greek letters incised, supporting the theory that there was a Byzantine monastery located in the area. Ceramics from the Byzantine era have also been found here, and a building from the Byzantine or early Islamic period has been excavated.

In 1283 it was mentioned as part of the domain of the Crusaders, according to the hudna between the Crusaders and the Mamluk sultan Qalawun. At the time it was called Kafrata. Ceramics from the Mamluk era have also been found here. An excavation at Independence Street, Kiryat Ata, showed nearly continuous settlement dating from the Persian and Hellenistic eras up to the Mamluk era (late eleventh–early fifteenth century CE).

=== Ottoman era ===
Incorporated into the Ottoman Empire in 1517, Kufrata appeared in the census of 1596, located in the Nahiya of Acca, part of Safad Sanjak. The population was 15 households, all Muslim. They paid a fixed tax rate of 20% on wheat, barley, fruit trees, cotton, goats and beehives, in addition to occasional revenues; a total of 1,508 akçe.

The village appeared under the name of Koufour Tai on the map that Pierre Jacotin compiled during Napoleon's invasion of 1799, while in 1856 it was named Kefr Ette on Kiepert's map of Palestine published that year.

In 1859 the population was estimated to be 100, and the cultivation was 16 feddans. In 1875 Victor Guérin visited, and found the village to have 50 houses.

In 1881 the Palestine Exploration Fund's Survey of Western Palestine described Kefr Etta as "a small adobe village, on the plain, with a well on the north and olives on the east."

A population list from about 1887 showed that Kh. Kefr Etta had about 285 inhabitants; all Muslims.

=== British Mandate era ===
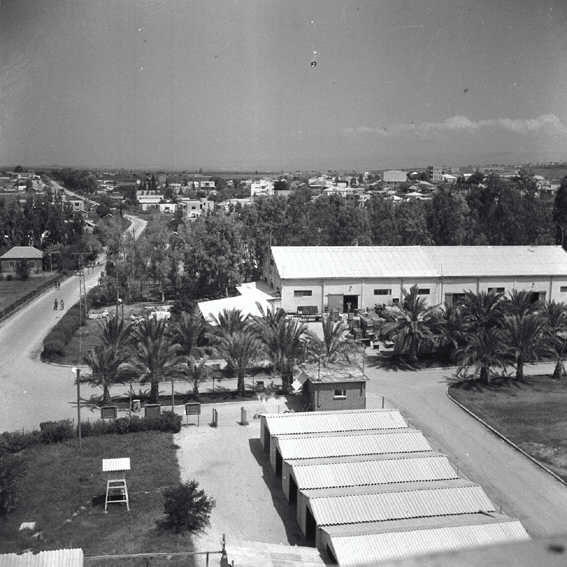
Kiryat Ata 1945

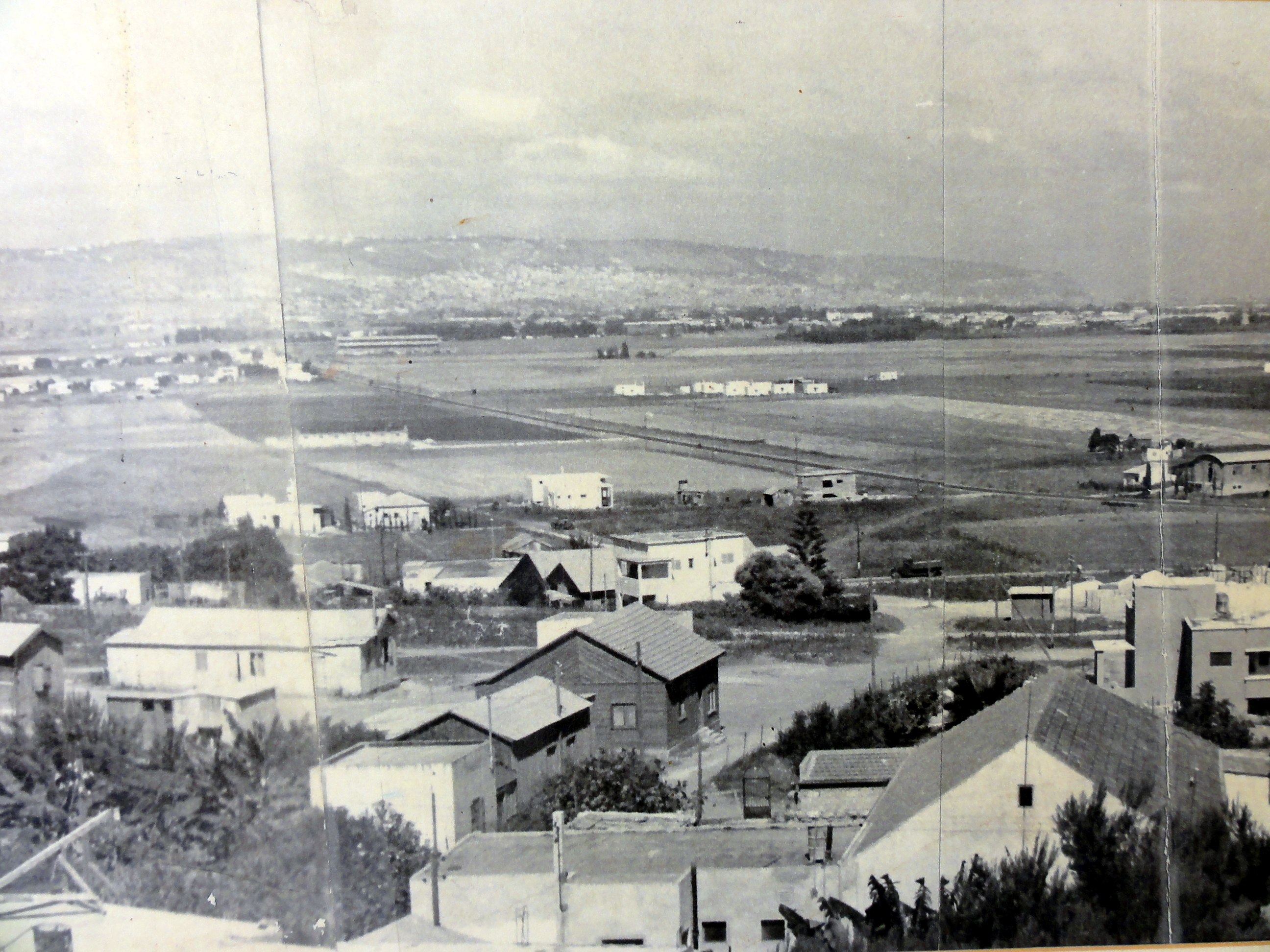
Kiryat Ata, 1947

In the 1922 census of Palestine conducted by the British Mandate authorities, Kufritta showed a population of 400; 7 Christians and 393 Muslims, where all the Christians were of the Orthodox faith.

The area was acquired by the Jewish community as part of the Sursock Purchase. In 1925 a Zionist organisation purchased 10,000 dunums from Alexander Sursock, of the Sursock family of Beirut. At the time, there were 75 families living there.

In the 1931 census Kufritta had a population of 4 Muslims and 29 Jews, in a total of 13 occupied houses.

In 1934, one of the country's largest textile plants, ATA, was established there.

In the 1945 statistics the population of Kfar Atta (Kufritta) consisted of 1,690 Jews and the land area was 6,131 dunams, according to an official land and population survey. Of this, 6 dunams were designated for citrus and bananas, 39 dunams for plantations and irrigable land, 1,527 for cereals, while 3,591 dunams were built-up (urban) areas.

=== Kiryat Ata ===
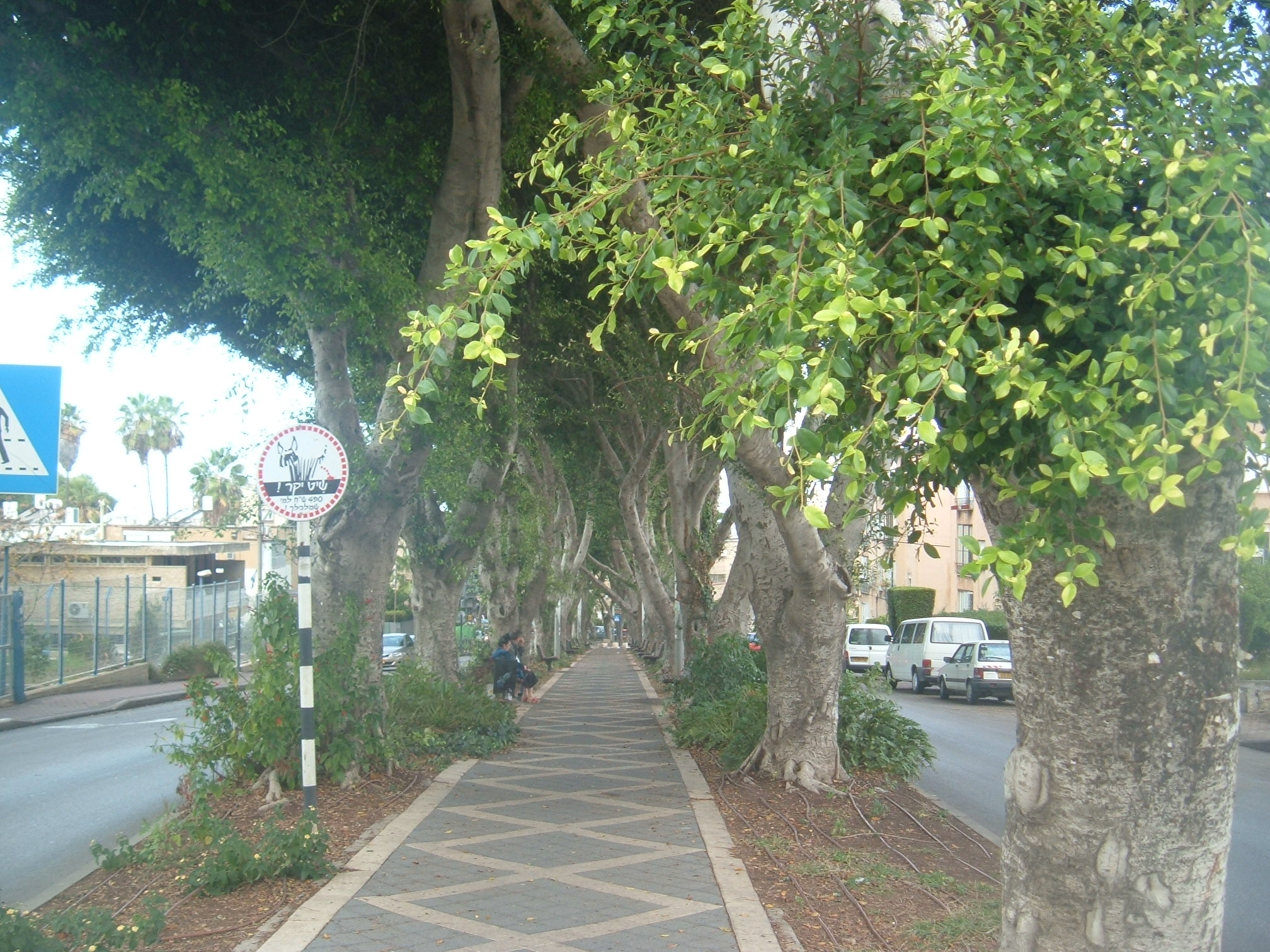
HaTzionut Boulevard

In the early twentieth century, the lands of the Arab village of Kefr Etta were purchased by a Warsaw religious foundation named "Avodat Israel" through intermediaries in the American Zion Commonwealth. Avodat Israel founded Ata in 1925. During the 1929 Arab riots the town was attacked and abandoned. A year later the residents returned and rebuilt the community. The town was renamed Kfar Ata in 1940, which was also the name of the local textile factory. In 1965, when the village was merged with adjacent Kiryat Binyamin, the name became Kiryat Ata.

== Climate ==
Kiryat Ata has a Mediterranean climate with hot, dry summers and cool and rainy winters. The hottest month is July and the coldest is February. Snowfall is rare, but snow was recorded three times in the 20th century: in 1950, 1992 and 1999. Annual precipitation is approximately 524 millimeters (20.6 in).

== Demographics ==
Historical population
Year	Pop.	±%
1972	27,300	—
1983	33,800	+23.8%
1995	43,300	+28.1%
2008	50,400	+16.4%
2022	60,465	+20.0%
2024	62,584	+3.5%

According to CBS, in 2001 the ethnic makeup of the city was 99.8% Jewish and other non-Arab, without a significant Arab population. See Population groups in Israel. According to CBS, in 2001 there were 23,700 males and 24,900 females. The population of the city was spread out, with 31.4% 19 years of age or younger, 15.7% between 20 and 29, 18.5% between 30 and 44, 18.3% from 45 to 59, 4.1% from 60 to 64, and 11.9% 65 years of age or older. The population growth rate in 2001 was 0.8%.

== Education ==
In 2000, there were 20 schools and 8,762 students in the city: 14 elementary schools with 4,899 students, and 11 high schools with 3,863 students. 52.0% of 12th graders were entitled to a matriculation certificate in 2001. In 2024 there are 22 schools.

== Landmarks ==
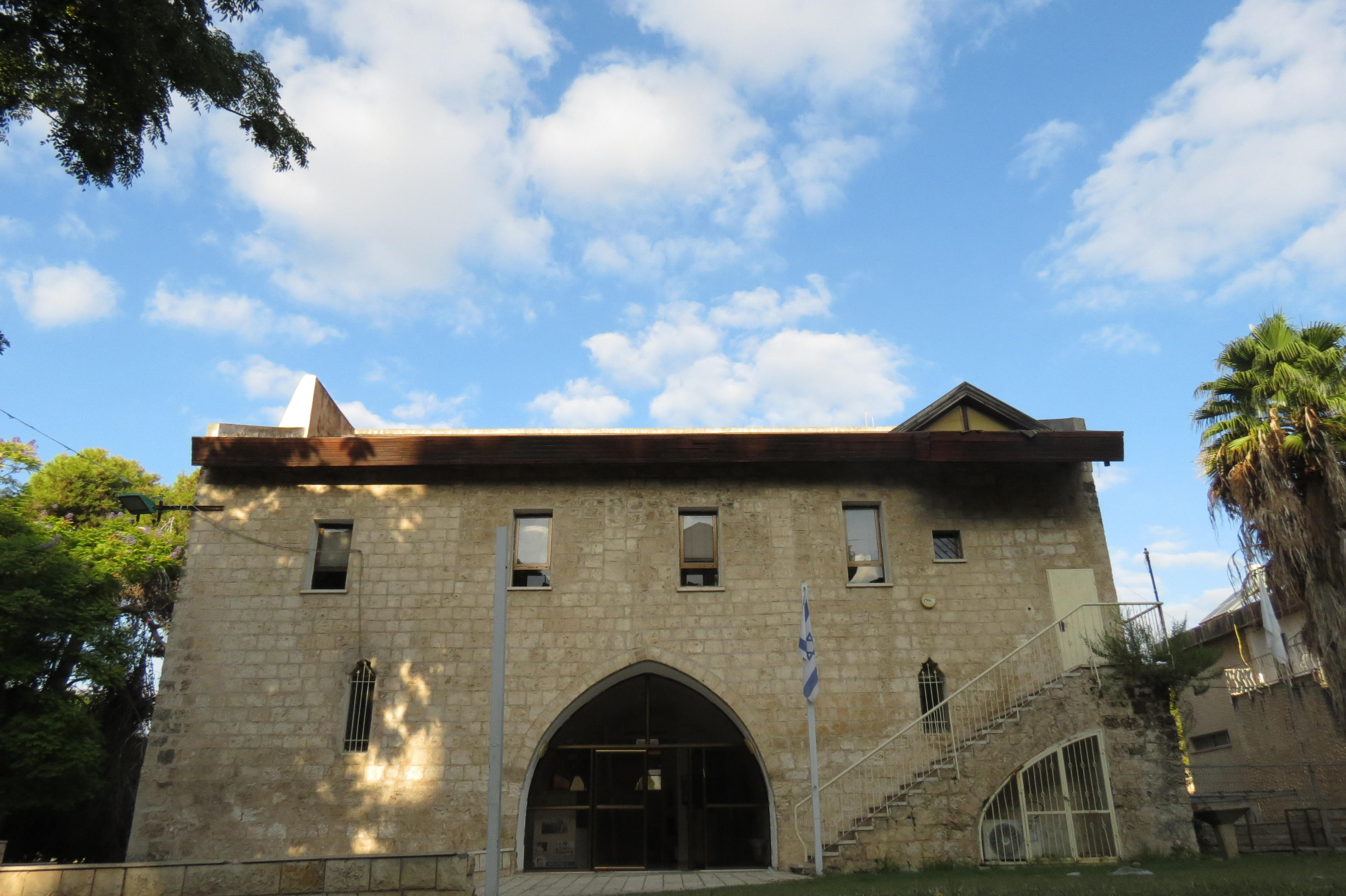
Beit Fisher Museum

The Fisher House, home of Yehoshua Fisher, one of the pioneers and leaders of the Kfar Ata Jewish community, was refurbished. The 19th-century building houses the Municipal Museum of the History of Kiryat Ata.

== Sports ==
The city's main football club, Maccabi Ironi Kiryat Ata, plays in Liga Alef, the third tier of Israeli football. The local basketball club, Elitzur Kiryat Ata, are in Ligat HaAl, the top division.

== Archaeology ==
Archaeological surveys at Khirbet Sharta in the northeast part of the city revealed traces of habitation dating to the Bronze, Iron, Hellenistic, Roman, Byzantine, and Mamluk eras. In 2010, an archaeological survey was conducted at the ancient site of Kiryat Ata by Hagit Turge on behalf of the Israel Antiquities Authority (IAA), and in 2014 and 2016 by Orit Segal.

== Voting Patterns ==
In the 2022 election, 67 percent of voters in Kiryat Ata voted for the parties of the right-wing coalition led by Benjamin Netanyahu, while 30 percent voted for the parties of the center-left coalition led by Yair Lapid and 0.07 percent voted for the Arab parties.

In the 2026 election, 61 percent of voters in Kiryat Ata voted for the parties of the right-wing coalition led by Benjamin Netanyahu, while 32 percent voted for the parties of the center-left coalition led by Gadi Eisenkot and 0.2 percent voted for the Arab parties. An additional 3.2 percent voted for the Reservists, and 2.2 percent voted for Amcha Yisrael. Voter turnout increased 16 percent from the 2022 election.

== Sister cities ==
- Reinickendorf, Germany (since 1976)
- Šabac, Serbia

== Notable people ==
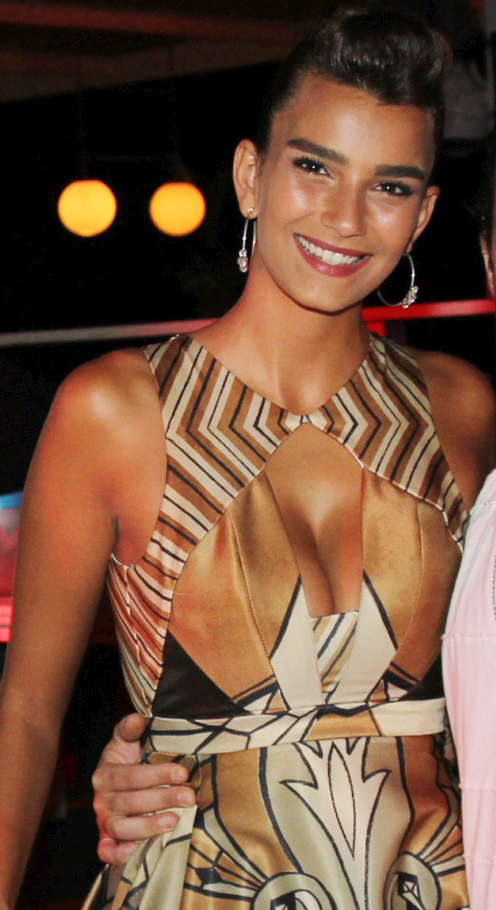
Shani Hazan - Miss Israel 2012

- Shai Abuhatsira (born 1980), deputy mayor of Haifa
- Alon Abutbul (1965–2025) , actor
- Avraham Abutbul (1961–2012), actor and singer
- Erez Lev Ari, singer-songwriter
- Ami Omer Dadaon (born 2000), Paralympic champion swimmer
- Tal Friedman (born 1963), comedian, actor and musician
- Yuval Noah Harari, author and historian, was born in Kiryat Ata
- Shani Hazan (born 1992), beauty pageant titleholder (Miss Israel 2012)
- Ishtar (born 1968), French-Israeli singer
- Yaniv Katan (born 1981), association football player
- Oded Liphshitz, playwright
- Hovi Star, singer
- Meir Tapiro (born 1975), basketball player, and current CEO of Ironi Nes Ziona
- Tomer White Glasses (born 1983), celebrity during the 2026 Iran war
- Haim Yavin (born 1932), television anchor and documentary filmmaker
- Yossi Yona (born 1953), academic and politician
- Ozzy Zoltak (born 1983), singer-songwriter, born in Kiryat Ata

== Bibliography ==
- Aviam, Mordechai (2004). Jews, Pagans and Christians in the Galilee. Vol. Land of Galilee 1. Rochester, N.Y.: University of Rochester Press, Institute of Galilean Archaeology. ISBN 1-58046-171-9.
- ‘Awawdy, Eiad (11 September 2007). "Qiryat Ata" (119). Hadashot Arkheologiyot – Excavations and Surveys in Israel.
- Barag, D. [in Hebrew] (1979). "A new source concerning the ultimate borders of the Latin Kingdom of Jerusalem". Israel Exploration Journal. 29 (3/4): 197–217. JSTOR 27925726.
- Barron, J.B., ed. (1923). Palestine: Report and General Abstracts of the Census of 1922. Government of Palestine.
- Bouchenino, Aviva (5 December 2005). "Qiryat Ata" (117). Hadashot Arkheologiyot – Excavations and Surveys in Israel.
- Conder, C.R.; Kitchener, H.H. (1881). The Survey of Western Palestine: Memoirs of the Topography, Orography, Hydrography, and Archaeology. Vol. 1. London: Committee of the Palestine Exploration Fund.
- Dauphin, C. (1998). La Palestine byzantine, Peuplement et Populations. BAR International Series 726 (in French). Vol. III : Catalogue. Oxford: Archeopress. ISBN 0-860549-05-4.
- Government of Palestine, Department of Statistics (1945). Village Statistics, April, 1945.
- Golani, Amir (3 September 2006). "Qiryat Ata" (118). Hadashot Arkheologiyot – Excavations and Surveys in Israel.
- Golani, Amir (5 November 2012). "Qiryat Ata" (124). Hadashot Arkheologiyot – Excavations and Surveys in Israel.
- Guérin, V. (1880). Description Géographique Historique et Archéologique de la Palestine (in French). Vol. 3: Galilee, pt. 1. Paris: L'Imprimerie Nationale.
- Hadawi, S. (1970). Village Statistics of 1945: A Classification of Land and Area ownership in Palestine. Palestine Liberation Organization Research Center.
- Hamid, Amani Abu (17 November 2010). "Qiryat Ata" (122). Hadashot Arkheologiyot – Excavations and Surveys in Israel.
- Hütteroth, W.-D.; Abdulfattah, K. (1977). Historical Geography of Palestine, Transjordan and Southern Syria in the Late 16th Century. Erlanger Geographische Arbeiten, Sonderband 5. Erlangen, Germany: Vorstand der Fränkischen Geographischen Gesellschaft. ISBN 3-920405-41-2.
- Karmon, Y. (1960). "An Analysis of Jacotin's Map of Palestine" (PDF). Israel Exploration Journal. 10 (3, 4): 155–173, 244–253. Archived from the original (PDF) on 22 December 2019.
- Mills, E., ed. (1932). Census of Palestine 1931. Population of Villages, Towns and Administrative Areas. Jerusalem: Government of Palestine.
- Palmer, E.H. (1881). The Survey of Western Palestine: Arabic and English Name Lists Collected During the Survey by Lieutenants Conder and Kitchener, R. E. Transliterated and Explained by E.H. Palmer. Committee of the Palestine Exploration Fund.
- Rhode, H. (1979). Administration and Population of the Sancak of Safed in the Sixteenth Century. Columbia University. Archived from the original on 1 March 2020.
- Schumacher, G. (1888). "Population list of the Liwa of Akka". Quarterly Statement - Palestine Exploration Fund. 20: 169–191.
- Shadman, Amit (15 November 2006). "Qiryat Ata" (118). Hadashot Arkheologiyot – Excavations and Surveys in Israel.
- Tabar, Murad Anton (25 May 2010). "Qiryat Ata" (122). Hadashot Arkheologiyot – Excavations and Surveys in Israel.
- Talmi, Limor (17 October 2013). "Qiryat Ata, Giv'at Allonim (B)" (125). Hadashot Arkheologiyot – Excavations and Surveys in Israel.
- Talmi, Limor (26 May 2013). "Qiryat Ata, Giv'at Allonim (A)" (125). Hadashot Arkheologiyot – Excavations and Surveys in Israel.
- Torgë, Hagit; Sa‘id, ‘Abed a-Salam (23 December 2015). "Qiryat Ata" (127). Hadashot Arkheologiyot – Excavations and Surveys in Israel.
- Volynsky, Felix (28 November 2012). "Qiryat Ata" (124). Hadashot Arkheologiyot – Excavations and Surveys in Israel.
- Zaharoni, M. [in Hebrew] (1978). Israel Guide - Lower Galilee and Kinneret Region (A useful encyclopedia for the knowledge of the country) (in Hebrew). Vol. 3. Jerusalem: Keter Publishing House, in affiliation with the Israel Ministry of Defence. OCLC 745203905.
