= A Place in Heaven =

2013 film

- Film poster
- Hebrew: מקום בגן עדן
- Directed by: Yossi Madmoni
- Written by: Yossi Madmoni
- Produced by: David Mandil; Moshe Edery; Leon Edery
- Starring: Alon Aboutboul
- Cinematography: Boaz Yehonatan Yaacov
- Edited by: Arik Lahav Leibovich
- Music by: Ophir Leibovitch
- Production companies: United King Films; Movie Plus Prods.
- Distributed by: United King Films
- Release date: 30 June 2013 (Karlovy IFF)
- Running time: 118 minutes
- Country: Israel
- Language: Hebrew

A Place in Heaven (Hebrew: מקום בגן עדן Makom beGan Eden) is a 2013 Israeli drama film written and directed by Yossi Madmoni. It was screened in the Contemporary World Cinema section at the 2013 Toronto International Film Festival.

== Cast ==
- Alon Moni Aboutboul as Bambi
- Tom Graziani as Nimrod
- Rotem Zisman-Cohen as Ayala
- Yossi Pollak as Rabbi Simcha
- Sophia Ostritsky as Yulia, Bambi's companion
- Keren Berger as Hila, Nimrod's wife
- Michael Aloni as Young Nimrod
- Sasha Avshalom Agarounov as the Butcher
- Gabi Amrani as Ayala's father

== Accolades ==
The film received 10 nominations at the Ophir Awards, in the following categories:

- Best Actor (Alon Abutbul)
- Best Actress (Rotem Zisman Cohen)
- Best Supporting Actress (Keren Berger)
- Best Cinematography (Boaz Yehonatan Yaacov)
- Best Screenplay (Joseph Madmony)
- Best Production Design (Miguel Markin)
- Best Costume Design (Laura Sheim)
- Best Makeup (Ronit Dugo Arviv)
- Best Original Music (Ophir Leibovitch)
- Best Original Soundtrack (Tuli Hen, Alex Claude, Daniel Meir)
