= Tzufit Grant =

Israeli television personality

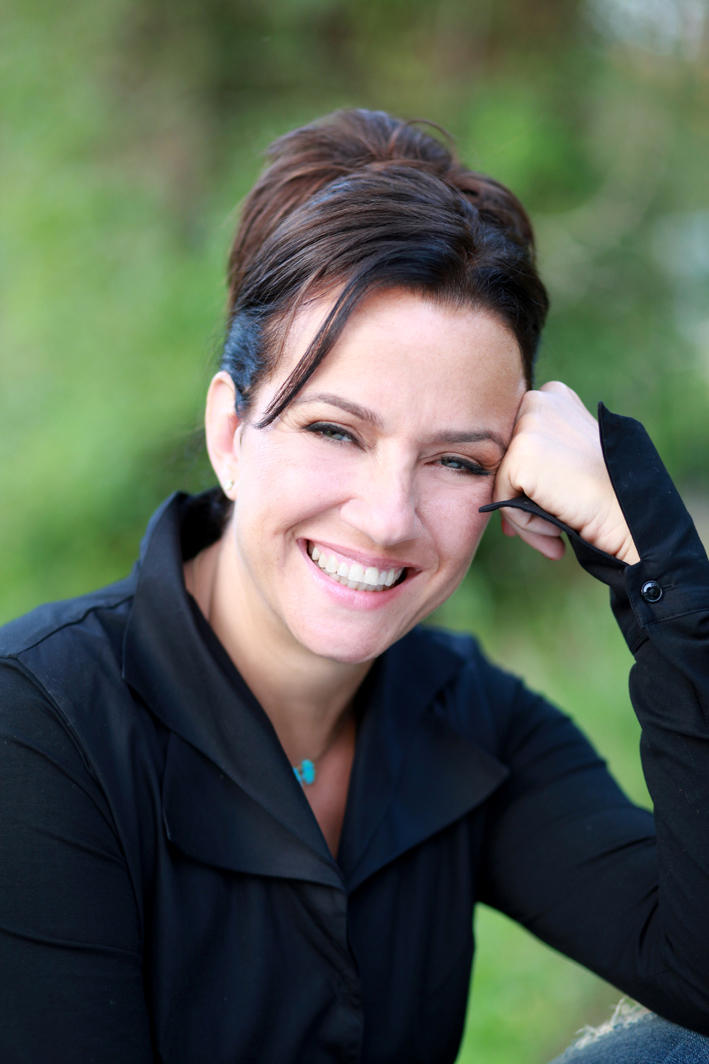
Tzufit Grant

Tzufit Grant (also spelled Tzofit; Hebrew: צופית גרנט; born 13 November 1964) is an Israeli actress and former host of the television show Milkshake. She was born in Petah Tikva, Israel.

== Career ==
Grant has acted in several TV shows and films, among them Matok VeMar and Distortion.

In 2011 she started hosting a television documentary series called Lost (Hebrew: אבודים), which helps reunite family members that have lost contact with one another, including adopted children and their biological parents. The show often involves international travel and ends with dramatic revelations.

== Personal life ==
Grant was married to Avram Grant and they have a son and daughter. Since 2020, she has been in a relationship with singer and creator Shuli Rand and the two were married on November 9, 2021.
