= Ozzy Zoltak =

Israeli musical artist

Ozzy Zoltak אוזי זולטק
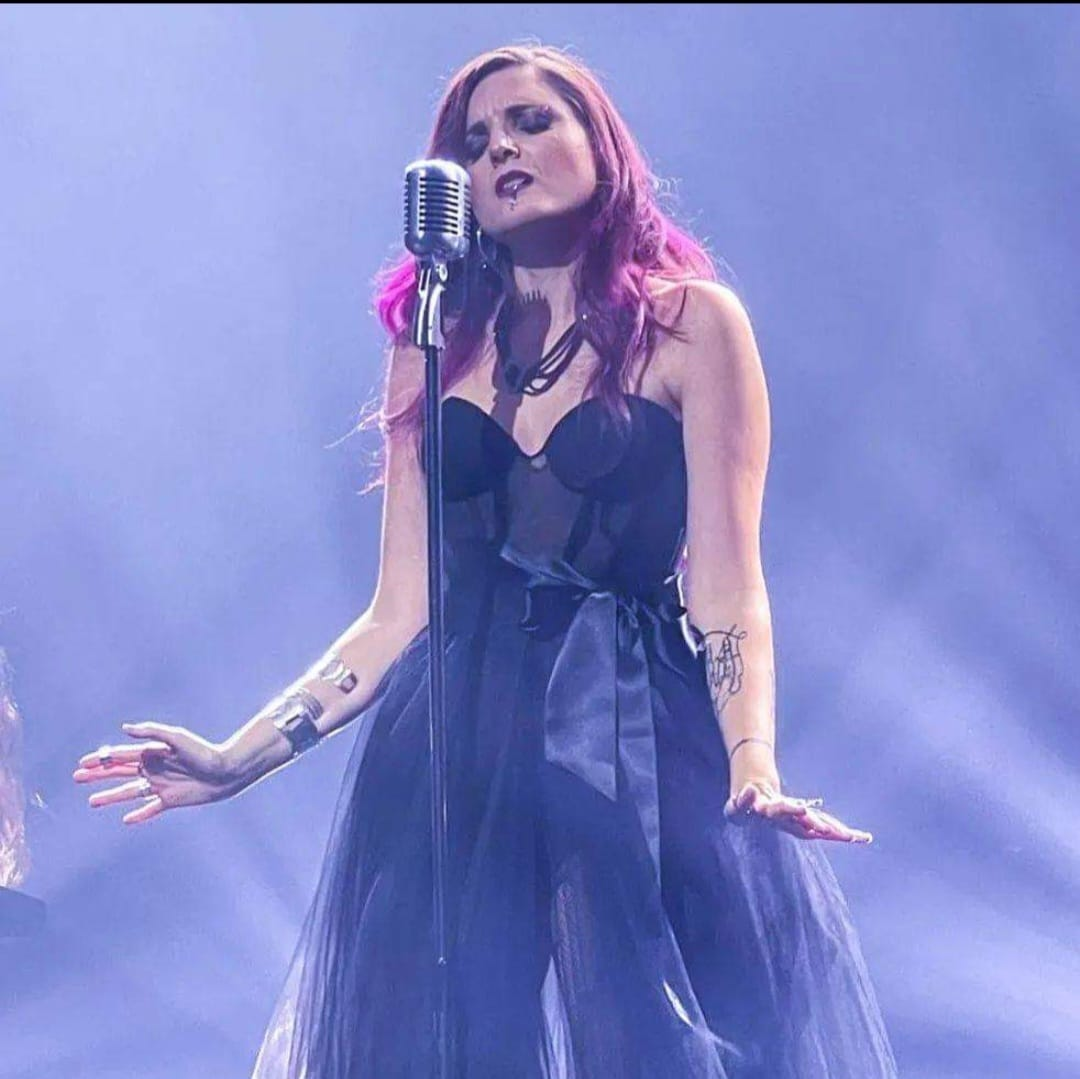
- Zoltak performing in 2021

Background information
- Born: Oshrat Zoltak; 6 June 1983 (age 43); Kiryat Ata, Israel
- Genres: Rock, pop, alternative rock
- Occupation: Singer

Ozzy Zoltak (Hebrew: אוזי זולטק; born June 6, 1983, as Oshrat Zoltak; Hebrew: אושרת זולטק) is an Israeli singer-songwriter known for her work in pop, pop-rock, alternative rock and electronic rock genres. Emerging in the EBM, synth-pop, and new wave scenes, she collaborated with German bands contributing to Tel Aviv's alternative culture. After her participation in the VIP season of the TV series Ma SheKore BeEilat, Zoltak gained significant publicity.

Zoltak, a hearing-impaired woman, openly discusses her hearing loss, aiming to break the stigma around it and promote the use of hearing aids.

== Biography ==
Born in Kiryat Ata, her parents immigrated from Poland and Russia during the 1970s wave of Aliyah from the Soviet Union.

Her first single, "Achshav Tori Ledaber" ("Now It's My Turn to Speak"), aired on Channel 24 in 2005 and entered the channel's playlist. During this period, she adopted the stage name "Emili".

In 2011, she opened for the German new wave band And One at Barby Club in Tel Aviv. In 2013, she opened for the German synth-pop and EBM band VNV Nation at the same venue. In 2015, she performed with Felix Marc and the German synth-pop band Diorama at the Barby Club in Tel Aviv.

In 2013, Zoltak released the single "Ma She'ata Hitchalta" ("What You Started") in collaboration with rapper HaTzel, but before the music video was released, a conflict arose between them due to ideological differences following the outbreak of Operation Protective Edge. Zoltak addressed the dispute stating, "Our energies are probably not on the same wavelength. I prefer to do things calmly, accept everyone, and be accepted by anyone who accepts me, regardless of origin or religion."

A year later, in 2014, Zoltak released her debut album, Ekdach Ta'un (Loaded Gun). From this album, the single "Lo Tamid" ("Not Always") was played on the radio and performed live on Channel 24.

Zoltak has collaborated with prominent artists such as Sihai Ma'ayan, Amir Dadon, and Eifo HaYeled. In 2023, she released a single she wrote and composed titled "Khalula" ("Void").

== Public activity ==
Zoltak is an advocate for the rights and awareness of hearing-impaired and deaf individuals. Since 2020, she has been serving as an ambassador for the organization Circle of Hearing. Within this role, she has participated in various campaigns to inspire children and adolescents with hearing impairments, using herself as a model as a woman with hearing loss who also uses hearing aids.

In the same year, she initiated the project Zoltak Kashevet, a voice development lesson for students in grades 6 to 9, teaching them how to sing properly, perform, and present.
