= Ushpizin =

- Directed by: Gidi Dar
- Written by: Shuli Rand
- Produced by: Gidi Dar; Rafi Bukai
- Starring: Shuli Rand; Michal Bat-Sheva Rand; Shaul Mizrahi; Ilan Ganani
- Music by: Nathaniel Méchaly
- Release dates: 11 July 2004 (Jerusalem Film Festival); August 2004
- Running time: 90 minutes
- Country: Israel
- Language: Hebrew

Ushpizin (Hebrew: האושפיזין, romanized: HaUshpizin, lit. 'The Sukkot guests') is a 2004 Israeli film directed by Gidi Dar and written by Shuli Rand.

The film was shot at the Schneller Compound and the Rand family’s home in Jerusalem, where some neighborhood residents participated in the production. It was made with special permits from rabbis. As part of the agreement with the rabbis, the film was not screened in cinemas on the Sabbath. The movie portrays the atmosphere and lifestyle of Jerusalem's ultra-Orthodox neighborhoods with considerable accuracy, showcasing typical characters and incorporating authentic expressions spoken by the actors. It was produced with the support of the Gesher Multicultural Film Fund.

The lead actors are Shuli Rand and his then-wife Michal Bat-Sheva Rand, alongside Shaul Mizrahi, Ilan Ganani, Avraham Abutbul, and others. The film's title is based on the concept of Ushpizin, which is associated with the Jewish holiday of Sukkot.

== Plot ==
Moshe (Shuli Rand) and Mali (Michal Batsheva Rand) Balanga are an impoverished, childless, Hasidic baalei teshuva ("returnees to Judaism") couple in the Breslov community in Jerusalem. After Moshe is passed over for a stipend he expected, they cannot pay their bills, much less prepare for the upcoming Jewish holiday of Sukkot.

After recalling a saying of Rabbi Nachman that difficult times are a test of faith, both of them pray independently before both receiving unexpected gifts: Mali receives a large sum of money after another person who was supposed to receive that stipend unexpectedly died, and Moshe's friend helps him move up a sukkah he thinks is abandoned. With the money, Moshe buys a very beautiful etrog, known as "the Diamond" for 1000 shekels (~300 USD).

The couple is visited by a pair of escaped convicts, one of whom, Eliyahu Scorpio (Shaul Mizrahi) knew Moshe in his earlier, non-religious life, and Eliyahu's friend, Yossef (Ilan Ganani). The convicts become their guests (ushpizin) in the sukkah. They are very disrespectful and ungrateful throughout their stay, with Eliyahu questioning Moshe's transformation in personality while reminding him of his earlier days, prompting Moshe to lie to them that he and Mali have to visit Mali's parents, a commitment that had been made before they expected guests, in order to get them to leave. Mali regrets this decision, recalling the story of Abraham and Sarah, who would invite anyone into their tent, even heretics and criminals, and teach them about God. She says that if this is a test from God, they failed miserably.

Eventually, Eliyahu and Yossef suspect that Moshe had been lying to them all along, and come back, to Moshe and Mali's relief. They try to be as hospitable as possible and ignore their disrespect. Eventually, the guests start grilling meat and peppers in the middle of the street playing loud techno music, despite the pleas of the community leaders, and Mali, to stop, prompting the police to come. Moshe tells Mali to tell the guests to hide immediately, leading to Mali's discovery that they are escaped convicts; angry at Moshe, she leaves to go to her mother's house, telling Moshe that he is not coming back. Eliyahu eventually acknowledges Moshe's transformation and tells Moshe that he respects that. However, later, when Eliyahu and Yossef mistake the expensive etrog for a lemon and use it in a salad, Moshe almost reverts to his old anger issues, before throwing the box down and running away, pleading with God that the test has been taken too far. After returning, he discovers that Mali has returned and is pregnant; nine months later, their son, Nachman, has his brit milah.

== Cast ==
- Shuli Rand as Moshe Bellanga
- Michal Batsheva Rand as Mali Bellanga
- Shaul Mizrahi as Eliyahu Scorpio
- Ilan Ganani as Yossef
- Avraham Abutbul as Ben Baruch

== Locations ==
Ushpizin was filmed on location in Jerusalem, Israel. While a few scenes were shot in Haredi neighbourhoods, most of the film was shot at the Schneller Orphanage and in Jerusalem's Nachlaot neighbourhood. Several streets in Nachlaot feature frequently in the film: Rama Street (where Ben-Baruch meets Moshe and offers him the Sukkah, and where Moshe and Malli part), Zichron Tuvyah (where Moshe's Yeshiva is located) and Tavor Street, while others appear less frequently or even in single shots. The stone buildings of Nachlaot substitute for the Shmuel Hanavi area, though landmarks such as the Wolfson Towers and the Yad Labanim building reveal the true location.

== Soundtrack ==
No separate soundtrack has been sold, though two of the main songs—"Ata Kadosh" and "Yesh Rak HaKadosh Baruch Hu"—were later released on an album by Adi Ran.

== Release and reception ==
The film received mostly positive reviews, and was described as a heartwarming tale for the Sukkot holiday. Michal Batsheva Rand's performance won many praises, being her first performance on screen.

The film was a box-office success, becoming one of the most financially successful Israeli movies of 2005. It attracted many religious and Haredi viewers who normally do not go to the cinema.

Following the release, Ushpizin was ranked by review aggregator Metacritic who gave it 70% out of a 100. Rotten Tomatoes gave the film 94% approval, which was based on 63 reviews. The site's consensus reads: "Ushpizin offers a rare and warmly intimate look into ultra-Orthodox Jewish culture".

== Haredi culture ==
Rand, for religious/modesty reasons, insisted that his wife, who had never acted before, star opposite him in the film.

The film was not directed at the Haredi film consumer, since Haredim do not go to movie theatres. Nonetheless, it attracted much attention and this led to heavy downloading and infringement of the movie from people who otherwise had no access to see the film. After inquiries from people who had watched unauthorized copies of the film asking how to pay, pashkvilen were put up in Haredi neighbourhoods. The advertisements told the public of the financial problem that resulted from the file sharing, a reminder of the prohibition against stealing and included a post office box and telephone number in which to pay with a credit card. Another way to repay the makers of the movie was to call movie theatres, order tickets, and not show up.

== Awards and nominations ==
The film was nominated for three Ophir Awards and Shuli Rand won for Best Actor. In his speech, he thanked God and Rabbi Nachman of Breslov. The film was also nominated for Best Screenplay for Shuli Rand and Best Supporting Actor for Shaul Mizrahi.
