= Alon Abutbul =

Israeli actor (1965–2025)

- אלון אבוטבול
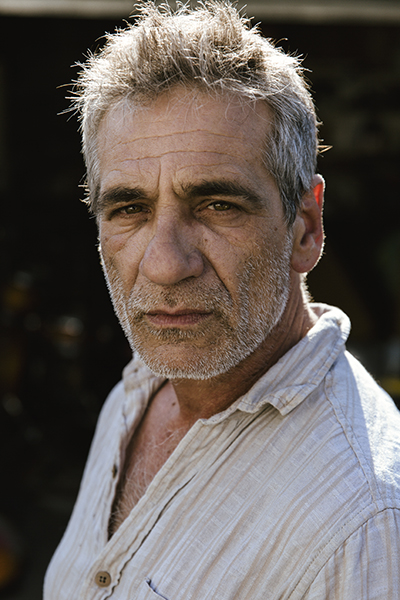
- Abutbul in 2019
- Born: Alon Moni Abutbul; 28 May 1965; Kiryat Ata, Israel
- Died: 29 July 2025 (aged 60); Dor-HaBonim Beach (near HaBonim, Israel)
- Other name: Alon Aboutboul
- Occupation: Actor
- Years active: 1979–2025
- Partner: Shir Bilya
- Children: 4
- Relatives: Avraham Abutbul (brother)

Alon Moni Abutbul (Hebrew: אלון מוני אבוטבול; 28 May 1965 – 29 July 2025) was an Israeli actor.

He won the Best Actor award at the 1986 and 1989 Jerusalem Film Festivals, the Film Actor of the Decade award at the 2000 Haifa International Film Festival, the 2003 Best Supporting Actor Ophir Award (Israeli Film Academy), and the 2013 Best Actor Award at the 44th International Film Festival of India.

He appeared in many films, including the 1986 Israeli war drama movie Shtei Etzbaot MiTzidon (Two Fingers from Sidon), the 1988 American action film Rambo III, the 2005 American historical action thriller film Munich directed by Steven Spielberg, the 2008 American action thriller film Body of Lies directed by Ridley Scott, the 2012 American superhero blockbuster The Dark Knight Rises, and the 2016 American action thriller film London Has Fallen. His last movie was the 2026 American historical drama film Monument, directed by Bryan Singer, in which Abutbul acted alongside Jon Voight and Joseph Mazzello.

== Early life ==
Abutbul was born in Kiryat Ata, Israel, to his parents, Moni and Arlette Aboutboul, in a Sephardic Jewish family from Egypt and Algeria. He attended the Thelma Yellin High School of Arts in Givatayim, Israel. His older brother Avraham Abutbul was also a notable actor.

Before launching his acting career, Abutbul completed his mandatory military service as a combat soldier and paratrooper in the Paratroopers Brigade of the Israel Defense Forces. His background in the paratroopers later informed his role as a company commander in the 1989 military drama Ehad Mishelanu (One of Us).

== Film career ==
=== 1980s ===
After graduating from the Thelma Yellin High School of Arts in 1983, Abutbul appeared in the Israeli coming-of-age drama film Hapnimiyah (The Boarding School). In 1986 Abutbul starred in the crime drama movie Bar 51 directed by Amos Guttman alongside Mosko Alkalai and Smadar Kilchinsky. That same year, he took part in the Israeli satirical comedy film The Battle for the Chairmanship (HaKrav Al HaVa'ad), performing alongside the popular Israeli comedy trio HaGashash HaHiver. In 1986 Abutbul appeared in the high school drama film Malkat Hakitah (The Classroom Queen).

Abutbul's first role in a big popular film was in 1986 when he was cast in the leading role in the Israeli war drama movie Shtei Etzbaot MiTzidon (Two Fingers from Sidon), a film which took place during the 1982 Lebanon War. For his performance in this film Abutbul was awarded the "Best Actor" award at the Jerusalem Film Festival. That year he also appeared in the American-Israeli romantic period drama co-production Every Time We Say Goodbye in which he played alongside Gila Almagor. In 1987 Abutbul appeared in the Israeli romantic drama Photo Roman. A year later, Abutbul played in the Israeli social drama film Makom L'Yad Hayam (A Place by the Sea) alongside Anat Tzachor, and in the American action film Rambo III alongside Sylvester Stallone.

In 1989, after appearing in a short drama film called Ha-Kluv (The Cage) and in the Israeli-American coproduction political drama Streets of Yesterday, Abutbul appeared in the Israeli military thriller/drama film Ehad Mishelanu (One of Us), alongside Dan Toren and Sharon Alexander. For his performance in the film Abutbul was awarded the "Best Actor" award in the Jerusalem Film Festival.

=== 1990s ===
In 1991, Abutbul featured in the American action film Killing Streets. A year later, in 1992, Abutbul starred in the Israeli drama film Roked Al Hahof (Dancing on the Beach). In 1993 Abutbul played in the Israeli drama film Ha-Yerusha (The Inheritance) alongside Avi Toledano. In 1993 Abutbul played in the direct-to-video American action film Deadly Heroes directed by Menahem Golan in which he played alongside Uri Gavriel.

In 1995, Abutbul produced Gur Bentwich's cult sci fi/drama film Ha-Kochav Hakachol (Planet Blue) in which he played the leading role. In 1995 Abutbul appeared in the Israeli comedy drama film Leylasede (Passover Fever) alongside Gila Almagor and Anat Waxman, and also played in the Israeli comedy film Ha-Khetzi HaSheni (The Second Half) alongside Orna Banai.

In 1998 Abutbul played in the Israeli TV film Mazal dagim (Pisces) and the Israeli drama film Gentila, and starred in the short film Im Hukim (With Rules), which won the Jury Award at the Munich International Festival of Film Schools and was a finalist for the Cinéfondation award at the Cannes Film Festival. In 1999 he participated in the Israeli drama movie Love at Second Sight (Ahava Mimabat Sheni).

=== 2000s ===
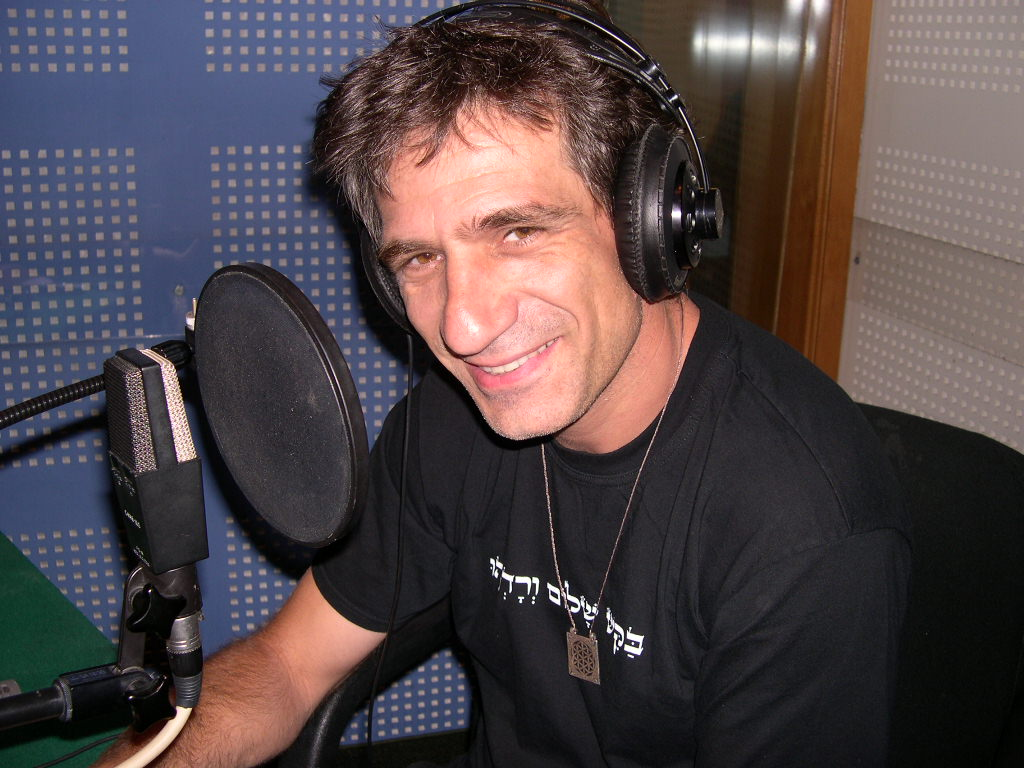
Abutbul in 2007

In 2000, Abutbul won the "Film Actor of the Decade" award at the Haifa International Film Festival.

In 2001, Abutbul played in the American action-adventure film The Order alongside Jean-Claude Van Damme and Charlton Heston among others. That same year he participated in the Israeli films Mars Turkey, a crime comedy, and A Five Minutes Walk, a crime drama.

In 2003, Abutbul starred in the Israeli comedy-drama film Nina's Tragedies alongside Ayelet Zurer and Yoram Hatab. The film won the Ophir Award for Best Film, and he was honored as Best Supporting Actor.

In 2005, Abutbul played alongside Moni Moshonov and Yuval Segal in the Israeli drama film Dance. That year he also appeared in the American historical action thriller film Munich directed by Steven Spielberg. In 2006 Abutbul played in the award-winning Israeli war drama film Beaufort directed by Joseph Cedar. In 2007 Abutbul played alongside Mili Avital and Anat Waxman in the comedy-drama film Noodle directed by Ayelet Menahemi and starred in the Israeli drama film Rak Klavim Ratzim Hofshi (Only Dogs Run Free) alongside Lior Ashkenazi, Ayelet Zurer and Assi Dayan.

In 2008, Abutbul played in the Israeli drama film Shiva (7 Days), and in the American action thriller film Body of Lies directed by Ridley Scott in which he played alongside Leonardo DiCaprio and Russell Crowe. In 2009 Abutbul starred in Yigal Burstein's drama film Hand of God alongside Moshe Ivgy and Dorit Bar-Or. In July 2008 Abutbul and Moshe Ivgy were awarded the Best Actor Award at the Jerusalem Film Festival for their roles in this film.

=== 2010s ===
In 2012, Abutbul appeared in the American superhero blockbuster The Dark Knight Rises, as an original character, Dr. Leonid Pavel. Abutbul starred in A Place in Heaven (2013), winning the Silver Peacock Award for Best Actor at the 44th International Film Festival of India. In 2015 he played in the American historical drama film Septembers of Shiraz as Mohsen, an Islamic Revolutionary Guard interrogator who releases Ishak (Adrien Brody) and destroys evidence of his collaboration with the Shah's regime, selling jewellery to the empress.

In 2016, Abutbul co-starred in the American action thriller film London Has Fallen, as the arms dealer turned terrorist mastermind Aamir Barkawi, alongside Gerard Butler, Aaron Eckhart, and Morgan Freeman.

=== 2020s ===
In 2024, he won the VIP season of the cooking competition My Kitchen Rules (Israel).

Abutbul's last movie was the 2026 American historical drama film Monument, directed by Bryan Singer, in which he acted alongside Jon Voight and Joseph Mazzello. The film was released in 2026, months after his death.

== Theater ==
Throughout the years, Abutbul played many theatre shows, mostly in the Habima Theatre, which included, among others: Hamlet, Caviar and Lentils, Blood Brothers, Closer, and Forgiveness. Abutbul also played in the Haifa Theater in various plays which included among others King Lear, Andorra, Yair, and Ben-Shitrit's Baby.

== Television ==
In 1997, Abutbul played alongside the Israeli actress Tinker Bell and Sivan Shavit in the Israeli drama A Speck on the Eyelash. In 1998, Abutbul played in the Israeli drama series Campaign. That same year he starred alongside Rivka Michaeli in the Israeli TV film Im Hukim. Since 1999 Abutbul began playing in the award-winning Israel drama series Shabatot VeHagim, alongside Dror Keren, Merav Gruber, Lior Ashkenazi and Yael Abecassis. The series lasted five seasons until 2004. Abutbul also directed one episode of the series.

In 2004, Abutbul participated in the Israeli TV movie Egoz. In 2005 Abutbul played alongside Yigal Adika in the Israeli drama series Melanoma My Love aired on the Israeli Channel 2. In 2006 Abutbul starred alongside Maya Dagan and Orna Banai in the Israeli Drama series Ima'le broadcast on the Israeli channel 2.

In 2007, Abutbul participated in the third season of the reality tv competition Dancing with the Stars which was broadcast on the Israeli Channel 2 and in addition to that he appeared in the Israeli drama series Lost and Found. In 2009 Abutbul participated in the third season of the Israeli telenovela Ha-Alufa. In 2010, Abutbul made guest appearances in several American television series, including NCIS, Fringe, The Mentalist, and Castle.

In 2012, Abutbul made an appearance in several more American television series, including the spy comedy-drama Burn Notice and the season 2 finale of espionage thriller Homeland. In 2013, Abutbul made appearances in the AMC crime drama series Low Winter Sun. Abutbul was a cast member of the FX TV crime drama series Snowfall. He appeared in 25 episodes from 2017 to 2022, as the character Avi Drexler.

Abutbul starred in the Tales of Arcadia animated science fantasy series in 3Below where he voiced the series main villain General Val Morando. In 2020, he appeared as Zev Shazam in Season 10, Episode 13 of the American police procedural drama Hawaii Five-0. In 2022–23, he appeared as Pavel Novikoff in two episodes of the American police procedural series FBI: International, seasons 1 and 2. In 2025, he appeared as Amos Shapira in eight episodes of the Israeli TV series The German. Prior to his sudden passing in July 2025, he was in pre-production to write and direct his feature directorial debut, Jacob's Dream.

== Personal life and death ==
Abutbul was in a relationship with Israeli director Shir Bilya, with whom he had four children. In the early 2010s, Abutbul and Shir Bilya relocated their family to Los Angeles to accommodate his growing international film and television career, splitting their time between the United States and Israel.

Abutbul was known for his social and political involvement: During the 2006 elections in Israel, Abutbul supported and ran as a candidate for the Knesset as a member of the Israeli Labor Party. During that time he wrote a special column titled "The Democratic Block" in the Israeli web portal Walla! and the popular Israeli news website Ynet and in addition he composed a special song titled "Tignov" ("Steal"), which dealt with corruption in Israeli society and leadership.

On 29 July 2025, Alon Abutbul collapsed while visiting Dor-HaBonim Beach (near HaBonim, Israel). After failed attempts at resuscitation, Magen David Adom declared him dead at age 60. At the time of his death, he was scheduled to start filming a new television series for the Israeli satellite television network, yes.

== Filmography ==
=== Film ===
Year	Title	Role	Notes
1980	Morning Star (Kohav Hashahar)		
1983	Hapnimiyah	Doron	
1986	Bar 51	Aranjuez	
1986	Shtei Etzbaot MiTzidon	Georgie	
1986	Every Time We Say Goodbye	Joseph	(as Alan Abovtboul)
1986	Malkat hakitah		
1986	Kol Abuvatai		
1986	Battle of the Chairmanship		
1987	Photo Roman		
1988	Rambo III	Nissem	(as Alon Abutbul)
1988	A Place by the Sea		
1989	Streets of yesterday	Amin Khalidi	
1989	One of Us	Yotam	
1991	Killing Streets	Abdel	
1992	Roked Al hahof		
1993	Deadly Heroes	Patrick	
1993	Ha- Versha		
1995	Leylasede	Nethanel	
1995	Ha-Kochav hakachol	Mulli	
1996	Marco Polo: The Missing Chapter	Aris	
1996	Ha-Khetzi HaSheni	Avi	
1997	Itha L'Netza		
1997	Im Hukim		A student film project
1997	Campaign		
1997	Gentila	Chaim Shoshana	
1999	Love at Second Sight		
2001	Mars Turkey	Reuven Shechter	
2001	A Five Minutes Walk		
2001	The Order	Avram	
2003	Nina's Tragedies	Avinoam	
2005	Munich	Israeli soldier with Zamir	(as Alon Aboutbul)
2006	The Belly Dancer	Goldy	
2007	Beaufort	Brig. Gen. Kimchi	
2007	Noodle	Izzy Sason	
2007	Rak klavim ratzim hofshi		
2008	Shiva	Itamar Obayon	
2008	Out of the Blue	Shabtai	Film renamed for the international release
2008	Body of Lies	Al-Saleem	
2012	The Dark Knight Rises	Dr. Leonid Pavel	(as Alon Moni Aboutboul)
2012	The Dealers	Sagi	
2013	A Place in Heaven	Bambi	(as Alon Moni Aboutboul)
2013	She is Coming Home	Zeev	
2014	Is That You?	Ronnie	
2015	Septembers of Shiraz	Mohsen	
2015	Harmonia	Abraham	
2016	London Has Fallen	Aamir Barkawi	(as Alon Moni Aboutboul)
2016	Boyka: Undisputed	Zourab	
2018	Beirut	Roni Niv	(as Alon Moni Aboutboul)
2018	Noble Savage	Yom Tov	
2021	Lansky	Yoram Alroy	
2022	MK Ultra	Townsend	
2026	Monument	Uri Lubrani	released after his death

=== Television ===
Year	Title	Role	Notes
2011	Fringe	Dr. Armand Silva	
2015	Dig	Mordechai	1 episode
2017–2022	Snowfall	Avi Drexler	25 episodes
2020	Hawaii Five-0	Zev Shazam	
2022–2023	FBI: International	Pavel Novikoff	2 episodes (as Alon Moni Aboutboul)
2025	The German	Amos Shapira	8 episodes
