= Adi Ran =

Israeli musician

Adi Ran עדי רן
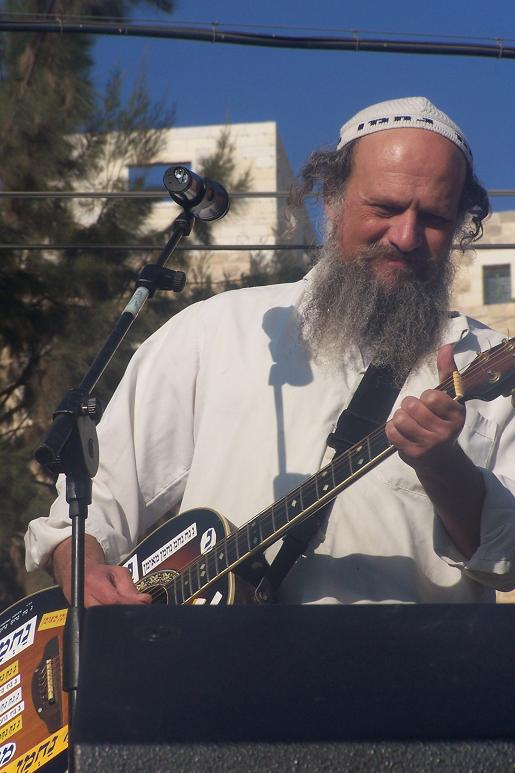

Background information
- Born: 1961 (age 64–65); Ramat Gan, Israel
- Genres: Jewish rock
- Occupations: Singer, musician, lyricist and composer
- Years active: 1993–present

Adi Ran (Hebrew: עדי רן; born 1961 in Ramat Gan) is an Israeli singer, musician, lyricist and composer who innovated a new music genre called Hasidic Underground (also known as Alternative Hasidic). He is a Na Nach Breslover. He has been called "The Bruce Springsteen of religious music".

== Biography ==
Ran began his musical career as coordinator in the Ramat Gan tribe of the Israel Boy and Girl Scouts Federation. Later, he attracted a loyal group of fans after starting to perform in Tel Aviv pubs on the local underground music scene.

In 1993, Ran became a baal teshuva and continued his music career heavily influenced spiritually by Breslov Hasidism in the new genre that he perhaps created and which he remains unique, Hasidic Underground.

== Ushpizin soundtrack ==
He rose to fame after the 2005 release of the film Ushpizin, whose soundtrack featured two of his older songs, "Atah Kadosh" and "Yesh Rak HaKadosh Baruch Hu".

As the title indicates, the Unplugged album is a 2-disc set of acoustic renderings of many of the songs from his studio recordings, performed in an often boisterous and exuberant manner, including a live version of "Atah Kadosh."

There is also a concert DVD of Adi Ran performing in Tsfat.

== Influences ==
His music is influenced by Israeli singers Meir Ariel, Arik Einstein, and Shalom Hanoch, and foreign acts like Bob Dylan, Led Zeppelin, TRex, and Pink Floyd. Adi Ran's music has frequent references to Breslov concepts.

He has recently been featured occasionally on Rabbi Lazer Brody's blog, "Lazer Beams," and travelled to Uman with Brody for Rosh Hashanah 2008.

== Discography ==
- 1998 – HaAharon SheBaAm, האחרון שבעם
- 2001 – Al Take BaSela, אל תכה בסלע
- 2004 – Ma Yesh Lakhem Lid'og, מה יש לכם לדאוג
- 2006 – Adi Ran Unplugged, עדי רן והגיטרה – אלבום אנפלאגד
- 2007 – Adi Ran and Srulik Herschtik, עדי רן ושרוליק הרשטיק
- 2007 – Live, בהופעה חיה
- 2009 – Hitbonenut, התבוננות
