= Balfouria =

Balfouria: בַּלפוּרְיָה (Hebrew)
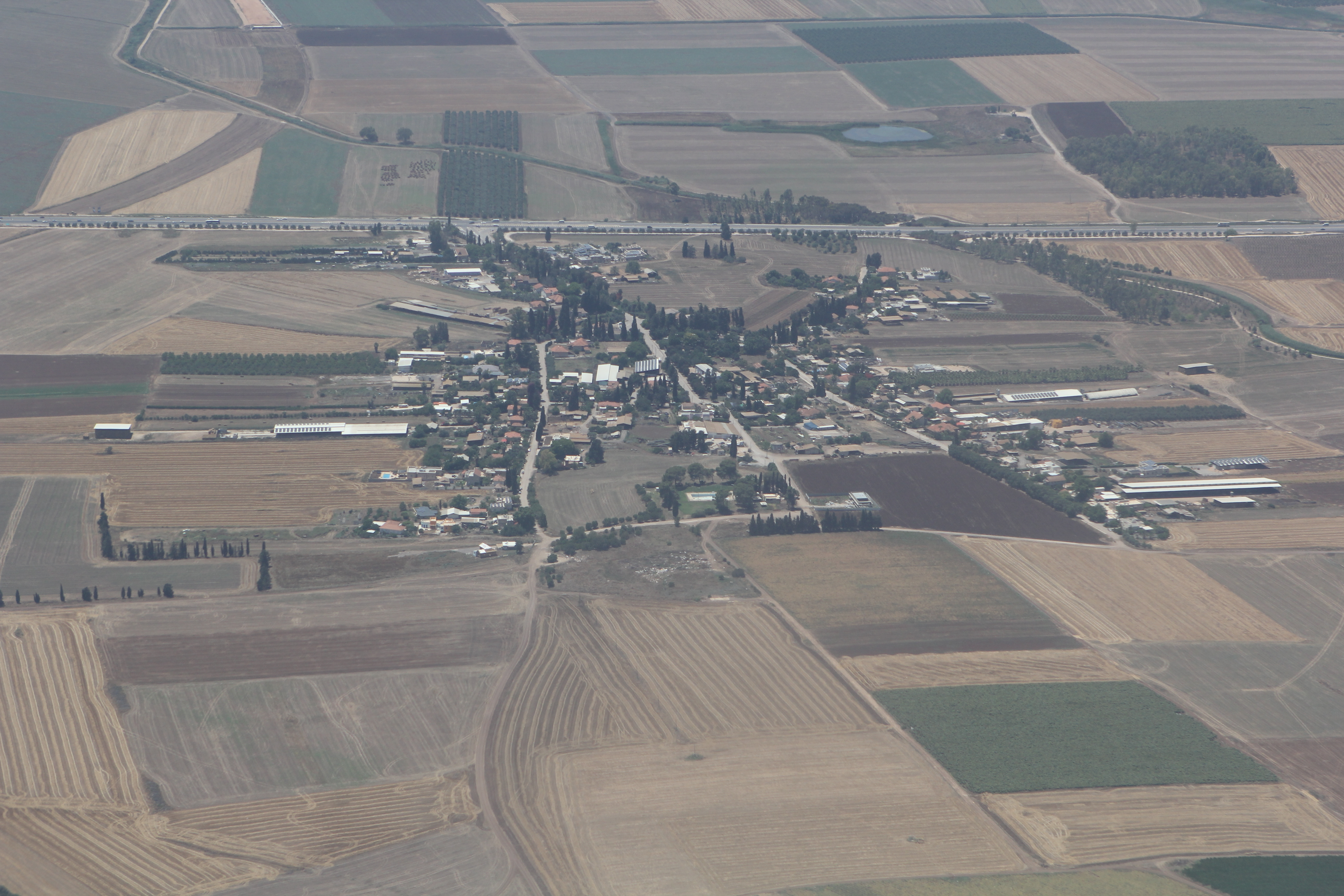
- Aerial view of Balfouria

- Location within Jezreel Valley region of Israel Location within Israel
- Coordinates: 32°37′49″N 35°17′47″E
- Country: Israel
- District: Northern
- Subdistrict: Jezreel
- Council: Jezreel Valley
- Affiliation: Moshavim Movement
- Founded: 1922
- Founder: American Zion Commonwealth
- Population (2024): 643

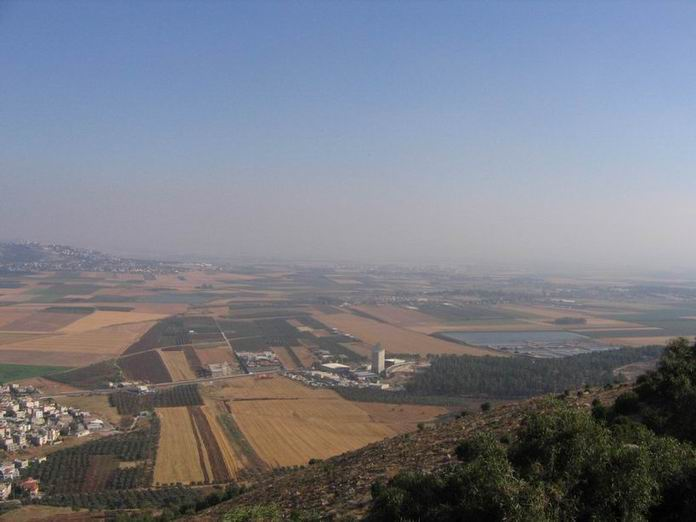
Jezreel Valley

Balfouria (Hebrew: בַּלפוּרְיָה) is a moshav in northern Israel, south of Nazareth. Located near Afula, it falls under the jurisdiction of Jezreel Valley Regional Council. As of 2024 it had a population of 643.

== History ==
The initial core of settlers assembled in 1919 and began training for the establishment of an agricultural settlement. A tract of land was purchased with the funds of the American Zion Commonwealth, and Keren Hayesod acquired equipment. The moshav was founded in 1922, the third to be established in Palestine, and was named after The 1st Earl of Balfour, writer of the Balfour Declaration (who consented to lending his name to the settlement), which embraced Zionist plans for a Jewish "national home". According to a census conducted in 1922 by the British Mandate authorities, Balfouria had a population of 18 Jews. According to a Jewish National Fund publication of 1949, Balfouria was the first village to be founded in Palestine after the Balfour Declaration.

The founders were joined by former kibbutz residents, a number of people from the Co-operative in Merhavia, as well as many settlers from Petah Tikva. The houses and dairy barns built with the funds of the Commonwealth were of concrete and had shingled roofs, thus earning the settlers of Balfouria the sobriquet "the millionaires". Lord Balfour visited the moshav in 1925 and gave the settlers his blessings.

In 1939, the lands of the moshav were transferred to the Jewish National Fund and leasing agreements were signed with Keren Hayesod. In 1934, the settlers completed the digging of a new well which increased agricultural activity in the area. In 1959, the connection with the Mekorot water company was sealed.

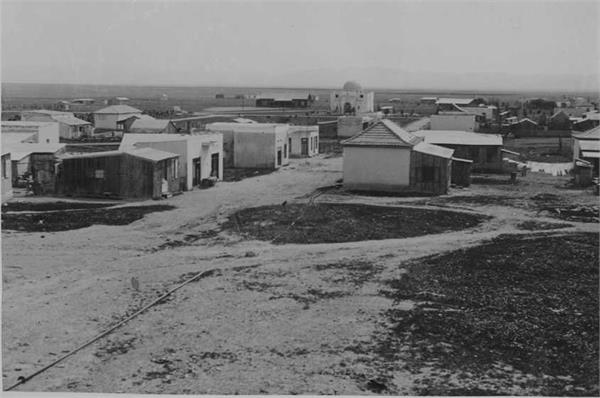
Balfouria 1945

== Balfouria nature reserve ==
North-east of the moshav are an ancient tell and springs - remnants of the Valley's swamps - that were declared a 45-dunam nature reserve, in 1979. Atop of the tell, a monument was erected in honor of the moshav's founders and those who fell in Israel's wars.

== Sports ==
The local football club, Hapoel Balfouria, spent two seasons in the top division in the mid-1950s. However, they later folded.
