= American Zion Commonwealth =

Former settlement corporation

The American Zion Commonwealth (Hebrew: קהילת ציון אמריקאית) was a Zionist settlement corporation that played an important part in the Jewish settlement of Palestine before the establishment of the State of Israel.

The American Zion Commonwealth company was founded in New York State in the United States in 1914 by American Zionists with the purpose of acquiring and developing lands for Jewish settlement in the Land of Israel. During World War I, the company's activities were suspended, but with the conquest of the land from the Turks by the British and the establishment of the British Mandate, the company returned to full operation. It was most active in the 1920s.

== Activities and acquisitions ==
The company acquired land in the heart of the western Jezreel Valley on which it established Moshav Balfouria in 1922. The town was named after the English Lord Arthur James Balfour, writer of the Balfour Declaration, which embraced Zionist plans for a Jewish "national home" in Palestine.

In 1924, the company purchased the lands of the village of Al-fula from an absentee landowner residing in Beirut. In 1925, the city of Afula was established on these lands. Already before the city's founding, the company purchased lands on which a "Children's Village" was founded, which today lies within Afula's boundaries. Its inhabitants were all young, and in World War II the village served as a training camp for the guards and as a glider club. With the establishment of the state, the village became a military base, which was used by the Israeli army until the 1990s.

In western Jezreel, the company purchased the lands of the village of Jida, on which Ramat Ishai was established in 1925.

In the Zebulun Valley, the company purchased the lands of the Arab village "Kofrita" as an agent for a Warsaw religious foundation "Avodat Yisra'el". This organization founded Kfar Ata in 1925, which eventually came to be called Kiryat Ata.

The jewel in the crown of the group's activities was the acquisition of a barren piece of land north of Tel Aviv on which the city of Herzliya was founded in 1925. The city was named after Theodor Herzl, the founder of modern Zionism, and is today one of the largest cities in Israel.

== Investors and later history ==
The company sold the lands it purchased to Jews in the United States and Poland. Many of the Polish buyers realized their acquisitions and settled the lands they bought, but others were murdered in the Holocaust and their land remained unclaimed. With the wave of immigration from the former USSR came descendants of these buyers who staked their claim to the land. American Jews who bought land from the company considered it as something between a charitable contribution and an investment for the Messianic age. Many of their descendants are fulfilling the investment today.

The company was unique among similar organizations in that it transferred full ownership rights to its buyers - as opposed to the Jewish National Fund which granted leasing rights only. As the years passed, the company became less active and its management was transferred to the government. In 1983, the company was dispersed. Land purchasers and their descendants who did not receive ownership of the lands by that year became creditors of the company. Since many of these buyers were considered missing, their litigation rights were transferred to the public trust. With this, the important role the company played in the history of the Zionist settlement came to an end.

== Other ==
In the two largest cities founded by the company, Afula and Herzliya, there are streets bearing the name קהילת ציון (Zion Commonwealth) in commemoration of its achievements.
