= Love at Second Sight (1999 film) =

- Theatrical release poster
- אהבה ממבט שני
- Directed by: Michal Bat-Adam
- Written by: Michal Bat-Adam
- Produced by: Michal Bat-Adam
- Starring: Michal Zoharetz; Alon Abutbul; Yossi Yadin; Nathan Cogan; Yigal Sade; Chaim Banai; Devorah Bertonov; Davida Karol; Matti Bahar; Ruth Geller; Orly Katan; Ra'anan Hefetz; Sami Huri; Shachar Bar; Shosh Shlam; Micha Celektar; Amir Bone; Michael Teplitzky; Itzik Farage; Guy Loel; Uri Omanuti; Ma'ayan Erez; Dror Shaked; Anat Salonim; Mira Kazdan; Shlomit Arnon; Daniel Mizrahi; Tal Yakobovich; Roee Hassan; Amos Ungar; Tammy Gropper; Leonid Kresnik; Doron Avrahami; Raz Binyamin; Yossi Eliyahu; Ariel Horowitz; Uzi Adarbi; Sandra Er; Elior Hemo; Eli Ben-David; Eli Salama; Shaul Biton; Marius van Dam; Göran Bergqvist; Sergey Selinkin; Uzi Dvir; Ran Bone; Limor Prag; Ruth Sheffer; Tal Terem; Gil Ben-David; Netanel Alon; Dror Ruth
- Cinematography: Yoav Kosh
- Edited by: Boaz Leon
- Music by: Daniel Mizrahi; Yehuda Oppenheimer
- Production companies: Ahava Mimabat Sheni Productions; Israel Broadcasting Authority; Israel Film Fund; The Yehoshua Rabinovich Tel Aviv Foundation for the Arts
- Distributed by: National Center for Jewish Film
- Release date: 18 February 1999 (Israel)
- Running time: 90 Minutes
- Country: Israel
- Language: Hebrew
- Budget: $ 400,000

Love at Second Sight (Hebrew: אהבה ממבט שני, romanized: Ahava Mimabat Sheni) is a 1999 Israeli independent underground dramatic art film directed by Michal Bat-Adam.

== Synopsis ==
Nina (Michal Zoharetz), a 25-year-old photographer living with an 80-year-old senior, Frumin (Nathan Cogan), with whom she is in a relationship, and, who developed an interest in the field due to the fact that her grandfather, Olek (Yossi Yadin, played by Micha Celektar as a younger man), was one too, discovers one day in one of the photos she took an interesting-looking man, Dan (Alon Abutbul), she did not notice while taking the picture. She begins looking for him, becoming obsessed with this search: Although Nina knows nothing about this man, she feels as if her relation to him is not some caprice, and knows he is meant for her and that she must find him, for, otherwise, she may not be able to live with herself.

== Reception ==
Writing in Haaretz, critic Uri Klein opined that the film, "although taking place in contemporary times, has something old in it, of an older, different, Israel, much older in fact, in which young women lived with elderly men and served their most elementary romantic fantasies."
