= Shuli Rand =

Israeli film actor, writer, and singer (born 1962)

Shuli Rand שולי רנד
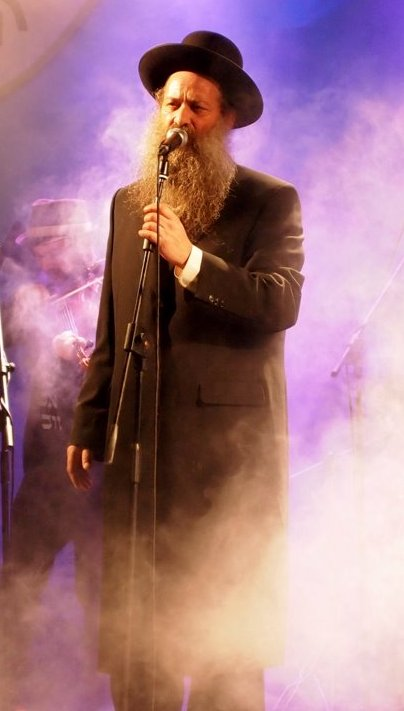
- Rand during a performance in Haifa, May 2011

Background information
- Born: Shalom Rand; 6 February 1962 (age 64); Bnei Brak, Israel
- Occupations: Singer, actor
- Years active: 1988-present

Shalom "Shuli" Rand (also spelled Shuly; Hebrew: שולי רנד; born 6 February 1962) is an Israeli film actor, writer, and singer. He is a Breslover Hasid and is best known in the English-speaking world for his role as the protagonist in Ushpizin (2004), for which he wrote the screenplay.

== Biography ==
Shalom Rand was born to a Religious Zionist family in Bnei Brak. His father, Professor Yaakov Rand, a winner of the Israel Prize for his contribution to special education, is a chazzan. He attended the Or Etzion yeshiva until age 18. After compulsory army service, Rand attended the Nissan Nativ Acting Studio in Tel Aviv and became an actor, abandoning Orthodox practice.

In 1996, he returned to observant Judaism. He later joined the Breslov Hasidic movement and moved to Jerusalem. He is a student of Rabbi Shalom Arush. Rand withdrew from acting to realize his religious aspirations, but after a six-year hiatus he returned to the theater, performing in one-man plays.

Rand and his first wife had seven children together. In 2004 he and his wife founded the Jewish Theatre of Jerusalem.

Rand wanted to divorce his first wife in 2016, but she refused to receive the get. After a year, Rand was granted a permission from 100 rabbis to remarry. He then married TV presenter Tzufit Grant.

== Acting and film career ==
Rand rose to stardom at age 26 after playing the lead role in Andrzej Wajda's play The Dybbuk at Habima theater. Rand was chosen Israel's Theater Actor of the Year several times. In 2004 Rand wrote, directed, and starred in the film Ushpizin. He cast his wife, Michal Batsheva Rand, also a baalat teshuva, as the protagonist's wife. While Michal Batsheva had no prior acting experience, Rand insisted on playing opposite her rather than another woman for halakhic reasons. In keeping with the halakhic standards of tzniut (modesty), the fictional husband and wife do not touch each other on screen.

Rand has also acted in Hameuad, Eddie King (1992), Life According to Agfa (1992), and New Land (1994). In 2018 he appeared in the dystopian drama miniseries, Autonomies.

Rand co-wrote the animated drama film Legend of Destruction (2021) with Gidi Dar. He also voiced one of the lead roles in the film.

== Singing career ==
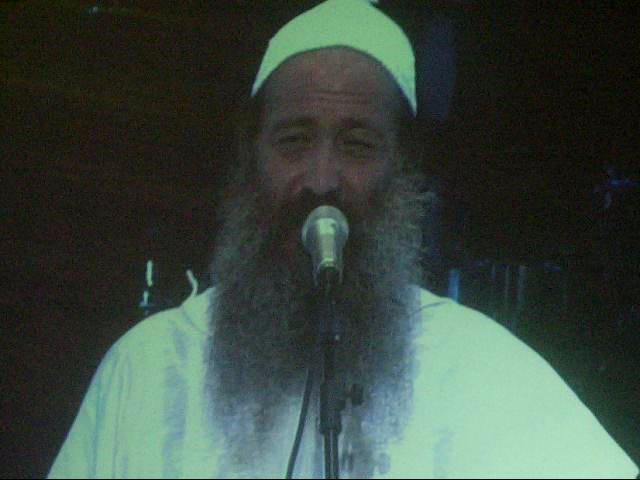
Rand during a performance in Caesarea, October 2009

After Ushpizin, Rand embarked on a music career, performing mostly for secular audiences. In 2008 he released his first album, Nekuda Tova (Hebrew: נקודה טובה, "Good Point") with 11 songs, which he composed himself based on the teachings of Rebbe Nachman of Breslov. Over 30,000 copies of the self-released CD were sold within 4 months, and it was awarded a gold album in Israel.

== Awards and recognition ==
Rand won the Ophir Award given by the Israel Film Academy twice. He was named Best Supporting Actor in 1993 for Life According to Agfa, and Best Actor in 2004 for Ushpizin.

== Discography ==
- Good Point (2008)
- Shuli Rand Live (2010)
- Back and Forth (2018)
- Shuli Sings Benayoun (2022)
