= Kugel (TV series) =

Israeli television drama series

- קוגל
- Genre: Drama
- Created by: Yehonatan Indursky
- Directed by: Erez Kav-El
- Starring: Sasson Gabai; Hadas Yaron; Mili Avital; Roy Nik; Igal Naor
- Music by: Tom Meira Armony; Assa Raviv
- Country of origin: Israel
- Original languages: Hebrew; Yiddish; Flemish
- No. of seasons: 1
- No. of episodes: 8

Production
- Producers: Dikla Barkai; Eitan Abot; Guy Hameiri
- Cinematography: Guy Raz
- Editors: Itamar Goldwasser; Amir Winkler
- Running time: 41–57 minutes
- Production company: yes

Original release
- Network: yes Drama
- Release: 5 December 2024

Kugel (Hebrew: קוגל) is an Israeli television drama series and prequel to the Israeli television drama series Shtisel. The show was created and written by Yehonatan Indursky, with Sasson Gabai and Hadas Yaron reprising their roles from Shtisel. The series takes place in Antwerp's Haredi community.

The series premiered on yes Drama in Israel on 5 December 2024.

== Development ==
Indursky, who previously created the Israeli television drama series Shtisel after abandoning Haredi religious practice, has since resumed an observant lifestyle. He initially conceived that a spin-off of Shtisel would focus on the Weiss family, led by Giti (Neta Riskin), Lipa (Zohar Strauss), and Ruchama (Shira Haas). He wrote two episodes, but put the project on hold to return to a third season of Shtisel.

He later returned to the idea of a spin-off. Beginning by considering focusing on Nuchem (Gabi), he then had a chance encounter in a bar with Yaron (who played Nuchem's daughter, Libbi). Yaron suggested revisiting her character, as Shtisel fans often asked Indursky about her fate. Speaking to Haaretz about Nuchem and Libbi in Shtisel, he explained: "Their characters had no autonomy, they just supported the story. So, it's kind of poetic justice that they get their own series now."

The series was shot entirely on location in Antwerp, Belgium. Non-actors from the city's Haredi community were hired for some minor roles. As American investors were interested, Indursky had considered setting the series in Brooklyn, but ultimately chose Antwerp, faithful to the backstory of Nuchem and Libbi in Shtisel.

== Plot ==
Set in the years preceding the events of Shtisel, Kugel centers on Nuchem Shtisel (Gabai), a charismatic and morally flexible jewelry merchant, and his daughter Libi (Yaron). They live in Antwerp in Belgium, where Nuchem's business dealings and personal choices begin to unravel his family life. His wife, Yides (Avital), frustrated by his dishonest behavior, seeks a divorce, prompting Nuchem to juggle efforts to salvage his marriage with aspirations of wealth and status.

Nuchem also becomes interested in Pnina Baumbach (Abuhab), a widow who inherits a restaurant famed for its Jerusalem-style noodle kugel.

== Cast ==
- Sasson Gabai as Nukhem Shtisel
- Hadas Yaron as Libbi Shtisel, Nukhem's daughter
- Mili Avital as Yidis Shtisel
- Roy Nik as Yolish Vermout
- Rotem Abuhav as Pnina Baumbach
- Igal Naor as Rabbi Vermout
- Aury Alby as Burech Slonim
- Rivka Michaeli as Madam Feintouch

== Release ==
The series premiered on yes Drama in Israel on 5 December 2024.

The series was released internationally by IZZY – Stream Israel on 28 February 2025.

The show received a premiere screening at Israel's Ministry of Foreign Affairs in April 2025.

== Reception ==
The show received critical acclaim upon its release in Israel.

The show series was praised by Rukhl Schaechter, writing in The Forward: "For Shtisel fans who’ve been waiting for another television series that depicts the members of a Hasidic community as real people rather than one-dimensional caricatures, Kugel really delivers. It tells a story filled with subtle cultural references and the witty irony of the Eastern European Yiddish tradition and, just as Shtisel did during its three seasons, draws us into the day-to-day lives of people in a Hasidic community as if these were our next-door neighbors."

The series was praised by Eliana Jordan for The Jewish Chronicle: "With its phenomenal writing, perfect pacing and all-round excellent storytelling this new Israeli series does its predecessor proud."

Lior Zaltzman praised the series in a review for Kveller, stating that it feels like a "Haredi fairytale", drawing favourable parallels with the work and themes of Haredi filmmaker, Rama Burshtein. Zaltzman praised the acting and cinematography and concluded "it is a marvelously warm comfort and a treat for the eyes and the heart, a little like the dish it is named after."

== See also ==
- Israeli television
- Haredim and Zionism
- Culture of Israel
