= Saint Petersburg International Film Festival =

Saint Petersburg International Film Festival (Russian: Са́нкт-Петербу́ргский междунаро́дный кинофестива́ль, translit. Sánkt-Peterbúrgskiy mezhdunaródniy kinofestivál; abbreviated as SPIFF) takes place as part of the Saint Petersburg international film forum. This is Saint Petersburg's first competitive international festival for feature-length fiction films.

== 2013 boycott ==
On 22 August 2013, media reported that Wentworth Miller would boycott the festival—to protest against laws banning "homosexual propaganda" in Russia.

== 2012 ==
=== Competition Programme ===
There were 14 films from different countries selected for the 2012 competition programme:

- White Elephant / Elefante blanco, 2012, dir. Pablo Trapero, Argentina-Spain
- Our Children / À perdre la raison, 2012, dir. Joachim Lafosse, Belgium-France
- Children of Sarajevo / Djeca, 2012, dir. Aida Begić, Bosnia and Herzegovina-Germany
- Invasion, 2012, dir. Dito Tsintsadze, Germany-Austria
- Off White Lies / Orhim le-rega, 2011, dir. Maya Kenig, Israel-France
- Hotchpotch / Shir tou Shir, 2011, dir. Ebrahim Forouzesh, Iran
- War Witch / Rebelle, 2012, dir. Kim Nguyen, Canada
- La playa DC, 2012, dir. Juan Andrés, Colombia
- Kolka Cool, 2011, dir. Juris Poškus, Latvia
- The End / Al Nihaya, 2011, dir. Hisham Lasri, Morocco
- I Also Want It / Ya tozhe hochu, 2012, dir. Alexei Balabanov, Russia
- Inside / Yeraltı, 2012, dir. Zeki Demirkubuz, Turkey
- Captive, 2012, dir. Brillante Mendoza, Finland-France-Germany-Great Britain
- Road North / Tie Pohjoiseen, 2012, dir. Mika Kaurismäki, Finland

=== The opening and closing films ===
The festival's opening film
Le grand soir, 2012, dir. Benoît Delépine, Gustave Kervern, France-Belgium
The festival's closing film
Shadow Dancer, 2012, dir. James Marsh, Great Britain-Ireland

=== Out-of-competition programmes ===
The out-of-competition programmes showed films which displayed the most recent trends in world cinema as well as several retrospectives. 2012's festival had 11 out-of-competition programmes:

- Shooting Stars EFP
- Bergman-Andersson-Donner (for the 30th anniversary of the release of I. Bergman's film Fanny and Alexander)
- Movies with a taste of Honey
- Movies of India without songs and dances
- The Unknown Lenfilm
- Films from East Asia
- Films from Nordic Countries
- Landmarks of Berlinale’s Forum (the best films from the International forum of young cinema
- Screenings in Honour of Filmmakers (Emir Kusturica, Nuri Bilge Ceylan, Aku Louhimies, Mihael Kalatozov)
- Please meet: Jerusalem IFF
- Premiere Before Premiere (pre-release screenings)

=== The Jury ===
President of the Jury

- Emir Kusturica, Serbia (Director, Scriptwriter, Producer, Actor, Composer)

Jury

- Aku Louhimies, Finland (Director, Scriptwriter, Producer)
- Erika Gregor, Germany (Film Historian, Expert)
- Gilli Mendel, Israel (Director of Film and Media Education at the Jerusalem Film Center)
- Elena Yatsura, Russia (Producer)
