= Thirteen Steps Down =

Thirteen Steps Down may refer to:

- Thirteen Steps Down (novel), a 2004 novel by Ruth Rendell
- Thirteen Steps Down (TV series), a 2012 television series based on the novel
