= Cameron Lawther =

English/Irish film producer and director

Michael Cameron Lawther (born 2 March 1990) is an English/Irish film producer and assistant director.

Lawther started his career as an assistant director while also working as an assistant to Brad Pitt on films including World War Z and Fury. He spent time as a set assistant to Kenneth Branagh, Gerard Butler, Jason Statham and F. Gary Gray. He produced the BAFTA nominated and Academy Award shortlisted film, Wale (2018).

He has directed music videos for Deyaz, a 28 minute one-take video & Keli Holiday.

In 2025, him and Gavin Kilduff founded “NINA Pictures”, a production company with development and funding capital, based out of Dublin, Ireland.

He is the brother of actor Alex Lawther.

== Filmography as producer ==
Year	Film	Producer	Writer	Director	Notes
2010	The Fear	Yes	Yes	Yes	Starring Alex Lawther.
2013	Puzzled	Yes	No	No	Short film. Won British Lion Award for Best Independent Film.
2014	Marmalade	Yes	No	No	Short film. Written by Chuck MacLean.
2015	Yussef is Complicated	Yes	No	No	Short film. Became educational programming in Taiwan. Directed by Vaughn Stein, starring Alex Lawther.
2015	My Fare Lady	Yes	No	No	Short film. Starring Sean Brosnan.
2015	AfterDeath	Yes	No	No	Starring Sam Keeley, Elarica Johnson, Miranda Raison, Daniella Kertesz.
2018	Wale	Yes	No	No	Nominated for a BAFTA and shortlisted for an Academy Award.
2023	For People In Trouble	Yes	No	No	Short film. Alex Lawther Directorial Debut
2023	Dog Run	Yes	No	No	Short film.
2024	Turning	Yes	No	No	Starring Will Hochman
