= Autonomies =

2018 Israeli TV miniseries

- Genre: Dystopian drama
- Created by: Ori Elon; Yehonatan Indursky
- Written by: Ori Elon; Yehonatan Indursky
- Directed by: Yehonatan Indursky
- Starring: Assi Cohen; Rotem Sela; Shuli Rand; Dana Ivgy; Daniella Kertesz
- Country of origin: Israel
- Original languages: Hebrew; Yiddish
- No. of seasons: 1
- No. of episodes: 6

Production
- Running time: 40 min
- Production company: Keshet Broadcasting

Original release
- Network: Hot 3
- Release: September 6, 2018 – present

Autonomies (Hebrew: אוטונומיות) is an Israeli dystopian drama miniseries created by Ori Elon and Yehonatan Indursky. The story is set in an alternate reality of present-day Israel, a nation torn and divided by a wall into the secular "State of Israel", with Tel Aviv as its capital, and the "Haredi Autonomy" in Jerusalem, run by a Haredi religious group. The series stars Assi Cohen, Rotem Sela and Shuli Rand. Keshet received its Israeli premiere on Hot 3 on 6 September 2018. The series received its world premiere on 1 May 2018 at the Festival Séries Mania in France. The series was also the centrepiece of the New York Jewish Film Festival in January 2019.

== Plot summary ==
The series is set in an alternative reality in which the State of Israel is split into two territories, a secular state with its capital in Tel Aviv, and a Haredi "autonomy" with Jerusalem as its capital. The series takes place in a parallel present, about thirty years after the bloody events of 1989, which ultimately led to the establishment of a Haredi federation in Jerusalem where Jewish law reigns. However, Bnei Brak became a suburb of secular Tel Aviv. In order to move between the two entities, permits and border controls are necessary. The local economy in the Haredi autonomy is facing difficulties. In addition, the government is governed by Jewish law and its Haredi interpretation, which includes a prohibition on selling non-kosher food. The police in the autonomy are known as "guards" and dress in Hasidic coats on which the ranks and symbols of the state are placed. They are tasked with maintaining order and the laws of religion and modesty in the autonomy.

At the center of the plot is a Haredi "macher" named Broide (Assi Cohen), who makes his living from smuggling minor contraband between the secular State of Israel and the Haredi autonomy. Goni, a girl raised by the secular couple Batia (Dana Ivgy) and Asher Luzzatto (Jacob Zada Daniel), turns out to be the daughter of Elka (Tali Sharon) and Hilik Rein (Dan Castoriano), the daughter and son-in-law of the Rebbe of Kreinitz (Shuli Rand).

Broide gets an offer from the Rebbe, who also receives smuggled books from him, in which he is required to kidnap the girl who is at the centre of a legal battle over custody between the two Haredi and secular families. When Broide declines the offer, he is coerced by the Rebbe and his henchmen into accepting. In the end, he agrees to do so only after being arrested on murder charges and the Rebbe gives him the option to accept the task or stand trial. Demanding that the Rebbe make a commitment to take care of his family in the event that he's harmed and to grant him a divorce from his wife, Blumi (Rotem Sela), the Rebbe accepts his terms. Broide goes on a mission and together with Anna, a woman from the secular State of Israel, they kidnap the girl and smuggle her to Ukraine while on the journey, Broida cuts off his beard and wigs and plans to start a new life in Europe with Anna.

During the events Elka accuses her father of organizing the kidnapping for political purposes to scorch the proposal of a union between the religious autonomy and the secular State of Israel. Independently of her father, she cooperates with Batia, which leads to criticism of her father which causes the Rebbe's health to deteriorate and to return to his community in the town of Kreinitz in Europe. This is where he also plans to reunite the kidnapped girl with her biological parents, but after his daughter tells the media that she is renouncing her claim to her daughter, he demands the return the child to her adoptive parents. The two parents leave for Europe to take the child back from the kidnappers. The girl gets away from her abductors, Broide and Anna. She is reunited at the local police station with both her adoptive and biological parents, where the adoptive parents then take her home with them.

In the meantime, the Rebbe dies, and Broide and Anna continue on a journey into Europe without the child. They are involved in a fatal train accident in which Anna dies and Broide is seriously injured. The body of a dead passenger is mistakenly identified as the body of Broide, and a message is transmitted to his ex-wife, who is married to Brody's friend Leibish. Broide struggles with his demons and meets the late Rebbe in a vision and responds to his request for absolution. Then he wakes up and returns to the Haredi autonomy. Upon returning he realizes that his ex-wife has remarried. He enters a Beit Midrash of a yeshiva and finds himself in a struggle between those who refuse to join the army and the Israeli Defence Force who are in the autonomy as part of the plan to annex the autonomy to the secular State of Israel. He becomes a conscientious objector and martyrs himself in opposition to the draft of Haredi men.

== Cast and characters ==
- Broide (Assi Cohen) – works in a Haredi community and smuggles objects from the secular state to the Haredim. He is married to Blumi (Sela) with whom he has children but develops an extra-marital affair with Anna Blum (whom he calls "Hannah"). The Rebbe of Kreinitz assigns him the task of returning the Rebbe's granddaughter from the State of Israel to the Haredi autonomy. He is forced to agree after the other choice for him is to stand trial for the (accidental) murder of Bevchik. He goes on a kidnapping mission to Ukraine during which he undergoes a deep process of internal identity struggles. At the end of the series, he sets himself on fire as a protest against the enlistment of Haredim into the IDF.
- Blumi Broide (Rotem Sela) – Yona's wife. She supports her husband but after pressure from the police on her and her children she begins to oppose his activities. Yona grants her a divorce, enabling her to marry Leibish.
- The Rebbe of Kreinitz (Shuli Rand) – leader of the Haredi Autonomy. After learning about the fate of his granddaughter being raised by a secular couple in the State of Israel, he embarks on an uncompromising struggle to return the child to her parents and for this reason he also puts pressure on Yona Broide (Cohen) to return the child to the autonomy. In retrospect, it appears that he apparently did so in order to influence the Council of Sages to reject the proposal for unification with the State of Israel. After the procedure failed, his medical condition deteriorates and after a few days he dies. After his death, Broide sees him in a vision / dream, where he asks forgiveness for everything that happened between them.
- Anna Blum (Daniella Kertesz) – a Tel Aviv jazz artist who develops a relationship with Broide after burying Gabriel, her partner who died of liver cancer. She helps Yona with his kidnapping mission. In the end, she is killed in a train accident in Ukraine.
- Batia Luzzatto (Dana Ivgy) – Goni's French adoptive mother, married to Asher with whom she is in the process of divorcing. The struggle to maintain custody of their child brings them together.
- Asher Luzzatto (Jacob Zada Daniel) – the adopted French father of Goni, who is married to Batya and is in the process of divorcing her.
- Goni Luzzatto (Nir-Nur) – the biological daughter of the Reins and the granddaughter of the Rebbe of Kreinitz. After her birth, she was swapped without the knowledge of her parents in the hospital with Batya's original baby, who died, and she grew up in the home of the French couple in Tel Aviv. While her parents are about to divorce, the Raines' family demand that the child returns to the autonomy to be raised by her religious biological parents. Ultimately she stays with her adoptive parents.
- Elka Rein (Tali Sharon) – daughter of the Rebbe of Kreinitz and wife of Hilik. Her daughter was switched at birth with Asher and Batia's dead baby and she is determined to get her back. Later she gives up her fight, for the good of the child.
- Yechiel "Hilik" Rein (Dan Castoriano) – Elka's husband, son-in-law and disciple of the Rebbe Makrinitz, who listens more to him than to his wife.

== Reception ==
An acclaimed series in its country of origin, Israel, The Jerusalem Post described the show as darker than Shtisel, the previous TV collaboration of Elon and Indursky, concluding that "Autonomies is a disturbing, thought-provoking and alarming look at a world that never was." A Haaretz writer was so intrigued by the concept of the show, suggesting it as a political point of discourse in Israel "I do not claim that Israel's cantonization would solve all of the country's problems. But Autonomies shows that it could lead to the point where Israel's various cultures could begin to appreciate each other's beauty rather than feeling mutually threatened." Tablet compared the series favourably to Fauda and described it as "suspenseful."

== U.S. adaptation ==
Keshet International is in the early planning stages of an English-language adaptation of the format, set in the United States and using America's own blue state–red state divide as a substitute for the original Israeli plot.
