= Matt Milne =

English actor and director

- Born: 18 November 1990 (age 35); Hereford, Herefordshire, England
- Education: University of East Anglia
- Occupations: Actor, director
- Years active: 2011–2022

Matt Milne (born 18 November 1990) is an English actor and director.

== Life and career ==
Milne was born in Hereford, in the West-Midlands of England.

In 2010, he filmed Steven Spielberg's War Horse based on the book of the same name by Michael Morpurgo playing a character not in the book: Andrew, a farm hand.

He graduated from the University of East Anglia with a B.A. in 2011.

During Autumn 2011, Milne performed with the National Youth Theatre in James Dacre's reimagining of the ancient legend Orpheus and Eurydice at the Old Vic Tunnels. He acted in the promenade piece and also played the bass guitar in the band as the actors took turns to play the score written by Nick Cave and the Bad Seeds.

As War Horse was released during late 2011 and early 2012, Milne joined ITV period drama Downton Abbey as the character of Alfred, a footman. He made his first appearance on Downton Abbey on the first episode of Season 3 and continued to appear until the finale episode of Season 4 in 2013. He travelled to the Bronx to film the Chuck MacLean short film Marmalade for Cameron Lawther in between.

Milne was part of the Jon Brittain play Margaret Thatcher: Queen of Soho during 2014, and the Michael Attenborough directed play Dangerous Corner. Milne directed the documentary What's the craic?! The International Dublin Gay Theatre Festival with Dublin-based filmmaking collective Kino-Dublin, or 'KinoD'.

== Filmography ==
=== Film ===
Year	Title	Role	Notes
2011	War Horse	Andrew Easton	
2012	Wrath of the Titans	Elite Guard 1	
2014	Marmalade	Rory	Short film
2014	Process	Man	Short film
2014	What's the Craic?! The International Dublin Gay Theatre Festival	Director	Documentary Short
2015	Dusha Shpiona	Additional Voices	
2016	Arnika	Paul	Short film
2016	Grant Me Safety: Life in the Migrant Camp Outside Calais	Director	Documentary
2017	Modern Life Is Rubbish	Gus	

=== Television ===
Year	Title	Role	Notes
2012 – 2013	Downton Abbey	Alfred Nugent	17 episodes
2016	Dog Squadron	Sergeant Stubbs	TV Short
