= Yehonatan Indursky =

Israeli filmmaker (born 1984)

- יהונתן אינדורסקי
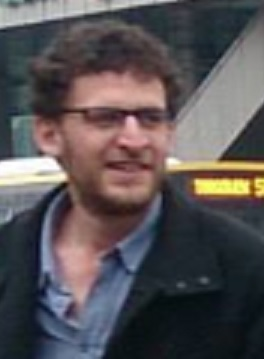
- Born: 1984 (age 41–42); Jerusalem, Israel
- Education: Sam Spiegel Film and Television School
- Occupations: Film director, scriptwriter
- Years active: 2011–present
- Spouse: Eva Indursky

Yehonatan Indursky (Hebrew: יהונתן אינדורסקי; born 1984) is an Israeli filmmaker and the creator of the successful Israeli drama series Shtisel, which was broadcast internationally by Netflix.

== Early life and education ==
Yehonatan Indursky was born in Jerusalem, the youngest of five children, to an ultra-Orthodox Jewish (Haredi Jewish) family of the Litvaks branch. His father worked as a copy editor and was also a synagogue cantor. His maternal grandparents were Holocaust survivors of concentration camps.

He studied at the Ultra Orthodox Yeshiva Ponevezh in Bnei Brak, Israel,. Whilst a student at the yeshiva, Indursky encountered the secular poetry of Rachel Bluwstein at a public library, marking the beginning of his departure from Haredi religious practice. His parents did not reject him for his decision to become secular and invited him to live with them in their apartment, where he was not expected to live an observant lifestyle. He visited a movie theater for the first time, seeing the Holocaust drama The Pianist, where he was overwhelmed by the depiction of “our most broken days,”. He later studied at the Sam Spiegel Film and Television School, Jerusalem, Israel.

His final short movie that he made at the school, detailing the lives of two Haredi Men, was awarded the Best Film Award at the School's graduation and was screened at the Jerusalem Film Festival.

== Career ==
=== Filmography ===
- "Driver" (Short, 2011) - graduation movie in Sam Spiegel Film School. Won the Best Film and Best Acting Awards of the SSFS in 2011 and been selected to the Jerusalem Film Festival;
- "Ponevezh Time" (2014) - Indursky's first full-length film: documentary, a rare and intimate look at one of Israel's leading yeshiva, Ponevezh Yeshiva, premiered in official competition in the Haifa Film Festival 2012 and was nominated for Best Documentary Film at the Israeli Academy Awards (Ophir);
- "The Cantor and the Sea" (Short, 2015);
- "Shtisel" (2013 - 2016) - as a screenwriter he created and wrote (with Ori Elon) the highly acclaimed Israeli drama series, Shtisel (in Hebrew שטיסל). In 2018 the series was broadcast on Netflix International.
- "Autonomies" (2018) - A dystopian mini TV drama series about an alternate reality of present-day Israel, a nation torn and divided by a wall between the secular capital of Tel Aviv, and the Haredi (ultra-Orthodox) Autonomy in Jerusalem. won Reflet d'Or, The Best International Television Series in Geneva International Film Festival 2018.
- "Driver" (2018) - an intimate exploration of lives at the fringes of Bnei Brak’s ultra-Orthodox community. The film won 3 prizes - Best Picture, Best actor and Best Screenplay from The Israeli Film Critics Forum 2018.
- "Kugel" (2024) - a prequel to Shtisel, set in the Haredi community of Antwerp.

== Awards ==
- 2011: The Best Film from Sam Spiegel Film and Television School for the "Driver";
- 2013: The Best Debut Film Award from the Israeli Documentary Filmmakers Forum for "Ponevezh Time";
- 2014: Warsaw Phoenix for the best documentary film, 10th International Film Festival Jewish Motifs for "Ponevezh Time".
- 2015: The best director prize in Jerusalem Film Festival for "The cantor and the sea".
- 2017: Israeli Television Academy Award for "Shtisel" (17 awards including "Best Series" and "Best Screenplay")
- 2018: Reflet d'Or, The Best International Television Series in Geneva International Film Festival for "Autonomies".
- 2018: Best film, Best actor and Best Screenplay for "Driver" from The Israeli Film Critics Forum.

== Personal life ==
Indursky has since resumed his observant lifestyle after twenty years, and now practises Hasidic Judaism.

He lives in Tel Aviv with his wife, Eva, an observant Jewish immigrant from France, as they favor the city's cultural liberalism. The couple have a daughter together.
