= Laura Illeborg =

Danish singer and songwriter (1969–2024)

- Illeborg in 2021

Background information
- Born: Anne Laura Illeborg; 8 January 1969; Nørrebro, Denmark
- Died: 1 October 2024 (aged 55) Østerbro, Denmark
- Genres: Pop; folk; rock
- Occupations: Singer; songwriter
- Years active: 19??–2024
- Website: laurailleborg.dk

Anne Laura Illeborg (8 January 1969 – 1 October 2024) was a Danish singer and songwriter.

== Career ==
Illeborg grew up on Nørrebro, Copenhagen, with her mother and younger brother, Jakob Illeborg. She began her music career in the group Sold Out, which included her brother and Oliver Zahle. Illeborg made her solo debut with her first studio album Lyv Mig Natten Lys in 1996, which was received positively by Danish music critics. The same was true with her follow-up album Sværger og Lover in 1998, which prompted a positive response from GAFFA writer Jan Opstrup Poulsen. She saw commercial success with the release of her album Lidt in Love in 2002, with the title song from the album used in several Danish-language films including Shake It All About.

Next followed God Vagt in 2007, before a number of group projects put Illeborg's solo releases on hold. She resumed them in 2018 accompanied by Niels Dahl and Knud Møller on the album Det Går Tit Godt and Exitstrategi in 2020. That was followed in 2022 by Disse Kanter, which now included Rune Funch on guitar and Jesper Elnegaard on drums. The albums spawned three nationwide tours from 2019 to 2022.

== Collaborations ==
In conjunction with her solo projects, Illeborg was involved in several collaborative projects over the years. The first of these resulted in the duo album Hjertekamre with Jens Lysdahl in 2004. Later, she teamed up with her longtime friend and singer Channe Nussbaum in the project Illeborg & Nussbaum, which resulted in a self-titled album from 2012 and Månen Ligger På Gulvet from 2016.

During the COVID-19 pandemic, Illeborg released the EP Syv Andre Sange, under the stage name Velur alongside Peter Hegård. In her last years, she played concerts in the company of Bagkataloget, a newly started project, where she, together with radio host and debater Torben Steno, reworked songs from both musicians' discographies in a live format. Her final album, Falder du, was released posthumously in March 2025. The album was released in collaboration with Frans Bak.

== Personal life and death ==
Illeborg became a nurse in 2006 and began working at Rigshospitalet. She was married to her husband, Jakob Kvist. The couple lived in Copenhagen and had three children.

On 28 September 2024, Illeborg performed at a concert in Tisvilde alongside Niels Dahl. During the show, Illeborg suffered a fall, resulting in a brain hemorrhage. She died on 1 October, announced on Facebook by her husband the following day.

== Discography ==
=== Studio albums ===
- 6.09 C.E.T. (1995)
- Lyv Mig Nattan Lys (1996)
- Sværger & Lover (1998)
- Lidt in love (2002)
- Hjertekamre (2004)
- God vagt (2007)
- Illeborg & Nussbaum (2012)
- Månen Ligger På Gulvet (2016)
- Det Går Til Godt (2018)
- Exitstrategi (2020)
- Disser Kanter (2022)
- Sange fra Søerne (2024)
- Falder du (2025)
