= Hadas Yaron =

Israeli actress

- הדס ירון
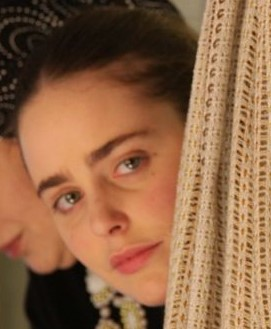
- Yaron as Shira in Fill the Void (2012)
- Born: April 12, 1990 (age 36); Israel
- Citizenship: Israel
- Occupation: Actress
- Years active: 2006–present

Hadas Yaron (Hebrew: הדס ירון; born April 12, 1990) is an Israeli actress. She began acting as a child and made her film debut as a supporting actress in the 2006 film, Out of Sight. Yaron played lead character Shira Mendelman in the 2012 Israeli drama film, Fill the Void. In September of that year, she received an Ophir Award and became the first Israeli to win the Volpi Cup for Best Actress at the Venice Film Festival.

== Early life ==
Yaron was born in Israel, to a secular Jewish family. She was raised in Tel Aviv. As an adolescent, she attended Tichon Eroni Alef Art School where she studied theatre.

After completing high school, Yaron served in the Israel Defense Forces (IDF) for two years as it is compulsory for women to serve in the military in Israel. "I was like a soldier but I wasn't a soldier," she said of her role in the army. "I was wearing my uniform, but I was in the educational system. I was kind of a guide in boarding school, like with kids and teenagers. I had a group and was with them all year long." She describes her years in the IDF as being "like a pause in your life".

== Career ==
"This is what ruins everything: fear. You are walking into a room and they are going to look at you and examine you and you feel very vulnerable in a way because you're very exposed. I said to myself, 'they are giving you an opportunity to read lines and to act,' so that helped me in a lot of auditions."

— Hadas Yaron on auditions

Hadas Yaron began acting at the age of eight and was first cast to perform in her first film, Out of Sight, at the age of 14. Out of Sight focuses on a young blind woman (Tali Sharon) who returns to Israel from the United States on learning that her cousin, Talia, has committed suicide, and her attempts to discover the reasoning behind it. Yaron portrayed a young Talia for flashbacks.

During and after her service in the army, Yaron worked as a waitress at a coffee shop in Dizengoff Street, Tel Aviv to make ends meet. She voiced the opinion that it's "funny that one night you're in an evening gown and the next you're back to serving coffee in the café". In an interview on "Good Evening with Guy Pines", the owner of the café remarked, "She's not a very good waitress. She trips and falls over everything."

Yaron auditioned for Rama Burshtein's film, Fill the Void, in 2010, and was cast in the lead role of Shira. Burshtein stated, "Hadas came towards the end of the process. I had seen everyone in Israel, but then she walked in and started the audition and I just burst out laughing like crazy because I knew that I had found her. The beauty of Hadas is that she didn't really understand what was happening. At one point I said to her, Hadas, you're 20 and you might be a huge star, what are you gonna do? She just smiled at me - this not understanding is really her beauty and what came through so well in the character of Shira."

The movie follows the lifestyle and choices of a family living among the Haredi Jewish community in Tel Aviv. Yaron's character, Shira, is an 18-year-old girl who is pressured to marry her deceased older sister's husband after the latter dies in childbirth. "It's all about emotions and choices and what leads you to do what you do," said Yaron. "I'm also young. But Shira is different from me because she is not familiar with all these feelings she experiences for the first time." Yaron found certain aspects of her character's relationship with her brother-in-law, Yochay, difficult to convey because she "had never done a part where there was romance" before. To become better acquainted with the traditions and regulations of Orthodox lifestyle, she began to learn the Hebrew blessings and, at Burshtein's request, attended all of the events that take place within the movie, including a wedding and a circumcision. The film was received well, and critics praised Yaron's performance. In September, she won Best Actress at the Venice Film Festival and the Ophir Awards, Israel's version of the Oscars.

In 2013, she had another prominent role as Libbi, a Haredi woman and the wife of the protagonist, Akiva Michael Aloni in the Jerusalem-set Shtisel. The show was popular in Israel but also had an international audience through streaming on Netflix. In 2014, Yaron again played a Haredi woman in the Montreal-set Canadian drama, Felix and Meira. Her performance was praised by Variety: "Yaron has a natural radiance that comes through as Meira starts to open up. Her expressions show that same precocity Woody Allen saw in Mariel Hemingway when making “Manhattan”: a young woman ripe and ready for experience, temporarily held back by her own naivete. To watch her face light up when she tries on a pair of jeans, say, or illuminated by the lights of Times Square during her own trip to New York, is to feel a sense of intuitive identification with the character."

In 2018, Yaron appeared as Sarah in the film Mary Magdalene, written by Helen Edmundson and directed by Garth Davis.

In 2024, Yaron appears alongside Aloni, Logan Lerman, Joey King and Lior Ashkenazi in the Hulu series, We Were the Lucky Ones.

== Filmography ==
Year	Title	Role	Notes
2006	Out of Sight	Young Talia Wolach	
2012	Fill the Void	Shira Mendelman	
2013	Shtisel	Libbi Shtisel, Akiva's cousin	First appearance in Season 2. Then a series regular.
2014	Felix and Meira	Meira	
2014	The Complexity of Happiness	Achinoam	
2018	Mary Magdalene	Sarah	
2018	Lucia's Grace	Madonna	
2020	Polygraph	Orr	Short film
2023	The Milky Way	Nili	
2024	We Were the Lucky Ones	Mila Kurc	Main cast
2024	Kugel	Libbi Shtisel	A spin-off from the hit show Shitsel.
2026	Our Loves		

== Awards ==
Year 2014	Award Best Actress	Category 32nd Torino Film Festival	Film Felix & Meira	Result	Ref(s)
2012	Venice Film Festival	Volpi Cup for Best Actress	Fill the Void	Won	
2012	Ophir Awards	Best actress	Fill the Void	Won	
2014	Whistler Film Festival	Best Actor in a Borsos Film Award	Félix & Meira	Won	
2015	Canadian Screen Awards	Best Actress	Félix & Meira	Nominated	
