= The Milky Way (2023 film) =

- Promotional release poster
- Directed by: Maya Kenig
- Written by: Maya Kenig
- Produced by: Maya Fischer; Gal Greenspan; Roi Kurland; Leon Edery; Alona Refua; Roni Shamiss
- Starring: Hila Ruach; Hadas Yaron
- Cinematography: Amit Yasur
- Edited by: Maya Kenig
- Music by: Assa Raviv; Tom Meira Armony; Hila Ruach
- Production companies: Green Productions; Les Films du Poisson
- Distributed by: Greenwich Entertainment (North America)
- Release date: November 14, 2023 (PÖFF)
- Running time: 98 minutes
- Countries: Israel; France
- Language: Hebrew

The Milky Way (Hebrew: חלב, romanized: Halav) is a 2023 Israeli-French dystopian black comedy film written, edited and directed by Maya Kenig. Starring Hila Ruach and Hadas Yaron. It is about a young musician and single mother who joins a company that extracts breast milk from poor women to sell to rich mothers.

== Synopsis ==
Tala is a 33-year-old woman who has become a single mother and is unsuccessful as an unconventional musician. Desperate for an income, she goes to work for 'The Milky Way', a breast milk dairy that provides rich mothers with the best quality breast milk from poor mothers. Her work and her meeting with one of the clients will take her on a journey about the complexity of motherhood.

== Cast ==
- Hila Ruach as Tala
- Hadas Yaron as Nili
- Omer Barnea as Eitan
- Milan Balalty as Sheleg
- Samira Saraya as Manar
- Tali Sharon as Manager of Milky Way
- Evgeny Moliboga as a Milkman
- Charlotte Philomena Crasta as Angie
- Seymor Daniel as Shoshana
- Maayan Turjeman as Betty
- Orli Roth Feldheim as Tala's mom
- Michael Fridburg as Lavi
- Kosta Kaplan as Tala's ex-boyfriend
- Elisabeth Kedem as Milky Way nurse
- Nuria Dina Lozinsky as Head nurse at the nursery

== Release ==
It had its world premiere on November 14, 2023, at the 27th Tallinn Black Nights Film Festival, then screened on June 10, 2024, at the Israel Film Center Festival, on July 20, 2024, at the 41st Jerusalem Film Festival, and on July 26, 2024, at the 44th San Francisco Jewish Film Festival. In early August 2024, the North American distribution rights to the film were acquired by Greenwich Entertainment.

== Accolades ==
Year	Award / Festival	Category	Recipient	Result	Ref.
2023	27th Tallinn Black Nights Film Festival	Critics' Picks Competition - Best Film	The Milky Way	Nominated	
2023	27th Tallinn Black Nights Film Festival	Special Jury Mention	The Milky Way	Won	
2024	41st Jerusalem Film Festival	Haggiag Award - Best Israeli Feature Film	The Milky Way	Nominated	
2024	41st Jerusalem Film Festival	Best Screenplay	Maya Kenig	Won	
2024	35th Ophir Awards	Best Picture	The Milky Way	Nominated	
2024	35th Ophir Awards	Best Director	Maya Kenig	Nominated	
2024	35th Ophir Awards	Best Supporting Actress	Hadas Yaron	Nominated	
2024	35th Ophir Awards	Best Screenplay	Maya Kenig	Won	
2024	35th Ophir Awards	Best Cinematography	Amit Yassour	Nominated	
2024	35th Ophir Awards	Best Music	Asa Raviv, Tom Meira Armoni & Hila Ruach	Nominated	
2024	35th Ophir Awards	Best Editing	Maya Kenig	Nominated	
2024	35th Ophir Awards	Best Art Direction	Hefi Boehm	Nominated	
2024	35th Ophir Awards	Best Costume Design	Raquel Ben Dahan	Nominated	
2024	35th Ophir Awards	Best Sound	Aviv Aldema	Nominated	
