= Frans Bak =

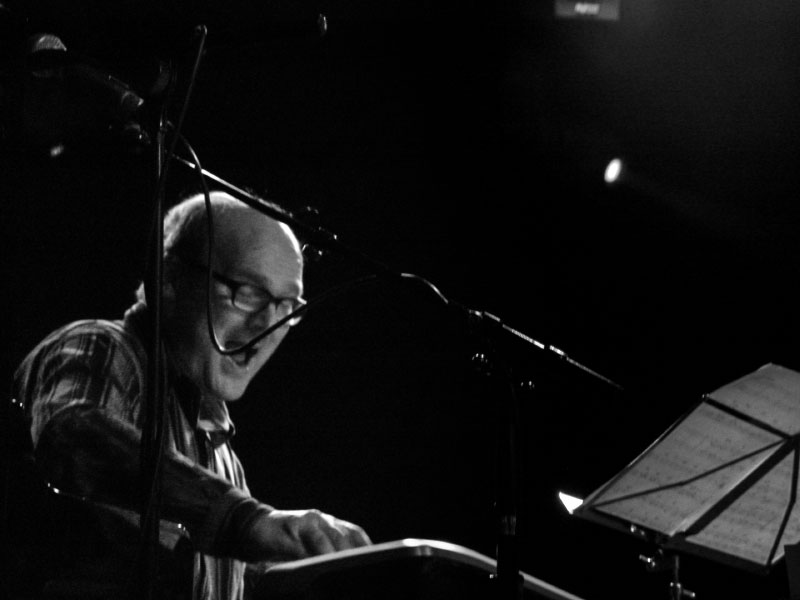

Background information
- Occupations: composer; conductor; musician
- Instruments: saxophone; piano

Frans Bak (born 7 February 1958 Copenhagen, Denmark) is a Danish composer, choral conductor, saxophonist, and pianist. He is a graduate of the Royal Danish Academy of Music and has worked as a jazz performer and composer of film music. In 1994, he founded the composer's association Den 3. Vej. He plays saxophone, keyboards, and piano.

== Career ==
Bak was a member of the bands Blast, Buztop, Santa Cruz, Det Glatte Lag, and Jazzgruppe 90. He was the leader of a quartet and of a big band that included Bob Berg and Randy Brecker. He recorded with Hans Ulrik on the album Fusion.

He wrote the score for the Danish television series Forbrydelsen and American remake, The Killing on AMC. He worked on Lilyhammer on NRK1/Netflix starring Steven Van Zandt, the British adaption of the Ruth Rendell novel Thirteen Steps Down and in 2015 the first series of Doctor Foster for the BBC.

Bak has scored commercials, short films, and feature films, including three Academy Award-nominated shorts: Ernst & The Light, Sweethearts?, and Helmer & Son.

In 2016 Bak released the album Sound of North which featured new compositions plus selections from The Killing. He went on to perform the album live in Beijing's Danish Cultural Centre in March 2017.

In 2020 Bak released the album PIANO. He discovered the piano he learned to play on as a child in a Copenhagen music shop window for sale, and bought it. Playing on this piano again, he revisited his childhood years and his love of creating simple and beautiful piano melodies.

In March 2025, alongside Laura Illeborg, released an album entitled Falder du. It was released posthumously following Illeborg's death in 2024.

== Discography ==
- Hymn to the Rainbow (L+R, 1992)
- Live in Copenhagen (Olufsen, 1993)
- Natsange (Stunt, 1999)
- Bossa Nuts (Stunt, 2011)
- The Killing (Decca, 2012)
- Doctor Foster OST (Drama Republic, 2015)
- The Sound of North (Mercury Classics, 2016)
- Conspiracy of Silence OST (Spinnup, 2018)
- Piano (Dharma Records, 2020)

== Film scores ==
- Huller i suppen (1988)
- Lad isbjørnene danse (1990)
- Casanova (1990)
- Karlsvognen (1992)
- Sidste time (1995)
- Operation Cobra (1995)
- Davids bog (1996)
- Albert (1998)
- Hatten i skyggen (2002)
- Forbrydelsen (2007)
- Forbrydelsen II (2009)
- Den som dræber (2011)
- The Killing (2011)
- Lilyhammer (2011)
- Min søsters børn alene hjemme (2012)
- The Killing season 2 (2012)
- Thirteen Steps Down (2012)
