= Ori Elon =

Israeli writer and filmmaker

Ori Elon (Hebrew: אורי אלון; born 1981) is an Israeli writer and filmmaker.

== Early life ==
Elon was born in kibbutz Shluhot, Israel, and had an Orthodox Jewish upbringing. He graduated from the Ma'aleh School of Television, Film and the Arts in Jerusalem.

== Career ==
Elon is the co-creator and writer (with Yehonatan Indursky) of the television drama series Shtisel (in Hebrew שטיסל), initially broadcast on satellite television station Yes Oh, and later picked up by Netflix. He is also one of the writers of the drama series Srugim (in Hebrew סרוגים), and the 2018 miniseries Autonomies.

In 2008 Elon authored The Invisible Show published by Keter Publishing House, a collection of short stories. In 2010, he also published the children book King Gogol also through Keter. In January 2020 Green Bean Books published another children's book called A Basket Full of Figs, illustrated by Menahem Halberstadt. Green Bean Books has also announced publication of a new children's book by Ori Elon called In the Market of Zakrobat for November 2021, again illustrated by Menahem Halberstadt.

== Awards ==
- Israeli Ministry of Culture's Cinema Prize for The Invisible Show
- Israeli Television Academy Award for Shtisel (10 awards including "Best Series" and "Best Screenplay")
- Israeli Television Academy Award for Srugim
