= AfterDeath =

2015 film directed by Gez Medinger and Robin Schmidt

- Directed by: Gez Medinger; Robin Schmidt
- Written by: Andrew Ellard
- Produced by: Cameron Lawther
- Starring: Miranda Raison; Sam Keeley; Daniella Kertesz; Elarica Johnson; Lorna Nickson Brown
- Cinematography: Benedict Spence
- Music by: Steve Wright
- Release date: 19 October 2015 (United Kingdom)
- Running time: 88 minutes
- Country: United Kingdom
- Language: English

AfterDeath is a 2015 horror film directed by Gez Medinger and Robin Schmidt, produced by Cameron Lawther. It stars Miranda Raison, Sam Keeley, Daniella Kertesz, Elarica Johnson and Lorna Nickson Brown as five twentysomethings who mysteriously end up in a remote cabin by the sea following a nightclub fire.

== Plot ==
Strong willed and organised Robyn wakes up unexpectedly on a strange beach. Panicked and with strange supernatural events happening around her she runs to a small cabin not far away. There she finds Seb is enjoying himself in a threesome with outgoing Patricia and the youngest, kind-hearted, Livvy. Uncertain of where she is she speaks to the three and finds out that they are in some sort of afterlife following the collapse of a roof in an overcrowded nightclub. Suddenly quiet and shy Onie appears out of no-where, suggesting she may be teetering between life and death. Clues are provided by the cabin itself, the different rooms, and two paintings inside the cabin.

Whilst the five get to know each other tensions flare as they try and work out why they are all there. A nearby lighthouse causes them all to have terrifying flashbacks accompanied by deafening sounds. Any attempt to walk away from the cabin towards the lighthouse is met by them somehow ending back up at the hut.

Despite Onie trying to self-harm, and the girls trying to kill Seb, it appears they can no longer 'die' again as they are already dead. A supernatural being of unknown power, manifesting as black smoke, takes over the bodies of Seb and Robyn at various points.

As time passes the 'bubble' they are trapped in slowly grows smaller around the cabin, which contains different rooms from each of the occupants' lives. It is determined that the house is a single occurrence of a cosmic test which everyone must undergo upon death (each group of deceased people encountering a unique house but the same test), with the solution being not to sin again having reached the tabula rasa ("blank slate") house. It is also determined that no-one has ever passed the test, that everyone outside the bubble is in Hell, and that Heaven is empty because of this.

Onie reappears and disappears for one last time having decided to live, leaving a blanket to control the smoke monster. Livvy uses the blanket to make Robyn possessed, revealing that she figured out Robyn's sin (she was the night club manager who let too many people in and caused the collapse) and convincing her to use the demon power to take Livvy to Heaven (hoping it will cause a destruction of all afterlife, harking back to a saying Patricia's father had said about Heaven being destroyed if a sinner were to enter). Upon destruction of the afterlife, Hell would theoretically also be destroyed, freeing every soul who ever died from it.

At the end the bubble closes on itself and the film ends abruptly, with the result of Livvy's plan left ambiguous.

== Cast ==
- Miranda Raison as Robyn
- Sam Keeley as Seb
- Daniella Kertesz as Onie
- Elarica Johnson as Patricia (credited as Elarica Gallacher)
- Lorna Nickson Brown as Livvy

== Filming location ==
The lighthouse in the film is the Happisburgh Lighthouse in Happisburgh, on the North Norfolk coast of eastern England.

== Critical response ==
The film received mixed reviews critically, scoring well for originality, but failing to deliver on early promise plot-wise.
