= Thirteen Steps Down (novel) =

Novel by Ruth Rendell

- First edition (UK)
- Author: Ruth Rendell
- Language: English
- Genre: Crime, Mystery novel
- Publisher: Hutchinson (UK); Crown (US); Doubleday Canada (Canada)
- Publication date: 2004
- Publication place: United Kingdom
- Media type: Print (Hardback & Paperback)
- Pages: 314 pp
- ISBN: 0-09-179975-9
- OCLC: 56640663
- Dewey Decimal: 823/.914 22
- LC Class: PR6068.E63 T47 2004b

Thirteen Steps Down (2004) is a psychological thriller novel by Ruth Rendell.

Its publication in the UK marked Rendell's 40th anniversary of being published, and all hardcover copies of the book had a special promotional notice on the cover celebrating this.

== Synopsis ==
Mix Cellini is a lonely, maladjusted young man who works for a company that repairs exercise equipment, and lives in the upstairs apartment of an old Victorian house on Notting Hill. While his reclusive landlady, Gwendoline Chawcer, spends her time reading and pondering lost loves, Mix grows dangerously obsessed with serial killer John Christie and a local model, Nerissa Nash, despite the fact that she hardly even acknowledges his existence.

== TV version ==
Thirteen Steps Down was filmed on location in London and Dublin as a two part thriller broadcast by ITV on 13 and 20 August 2012 starring Luke Treadaway, Geraldine James, and Elarica Gallacher.
