= The Forgotten (2014 film) =

- Theatrical film poster
- Directed by: Oliver Frampton
- Written by: Oliver Frampton; James Hall
- Produced by: Lee Arnold; Jennifer Handorf
- Starring: Clem Tibber; Shaun Dingwall; Elarica Gallacher
- Cinematography: Eben Bolter
- Edited by: Thomas Perrett
- Production company: Stickyback Pictures
- Release date: 22 August 2014 (FrightFest)
- Country: United Kingdom
- Language: English

The Forgotten is a 2014 British horror film, helmed by Oliver Frampton in his directorial debut, that premiered on 22 August 2014 at FrightFest, featuring a teenage protagonist who becomes the focus of attention of a ghost.

== Plot ==
Tommy (Clem Tibber) is a fourteen-year-old boy who goes to live with his father Mark (Shaun Dingwall) after his mother has a nervous breakdown. Dismayed upon learning that his father is now a squatter in an empty council estate destined for demolition, he nonetheless tries to make the best of it. Tommy is awoken each night by strange noises and on one occasion, finds that he and all of his belongings have been dragged from one side of the room to the other. Growing ever more terrified, Tommy tries to talk to his father but finds him becoming ever more bizarre and disturbing in behaviour.

== Cast ==
- Clem Tibber as Tommy
- Shaun Dingwall as Mark
- Elarica Gallacher as Carmen
- James Doherty as Martin
- Lyndsey Marshal as Sarah
- Lee Arnold as Police Officer
- Isaura Barbé-Brown as Carmen's Mother
- James Capel as Ian Wilson
- Luke Kidd as Youth
- Carys Lewis as Nurse
- Jennifer Matter as Candy
- Katherine Mount as Anna
- Conor Short as Adam

== Reception ==
SciFiNow wrote a mostly positive review, writing "There are one or two hiccups along the way, and the loose ends are all tied up a little too neatly to bring about the finale, but it’s a strong finish for a film that slowly finds its way under your skin. Genuinely affecting and chilling, this is an impressive and mournful debut." The Screen Daily was also mixed in their review, stating "The haunted, empty flat – with its red walls and deep shadows – is an impressive locale, but the ghost story element is a little too ordinary to leave a lasting impression." Nerdly wrote a similar opinion, ultimately saying that the movie "is a fantastic British horror movie that, even with its flaws, should be seen by all and marks director Oliver Frampton and writer James Hall as ones to watch."
