= Fill the Void =

2012 Israeli film

- Theatrical release poster
- Directed by: Rama Burshtein
- Written by: Rama Burshtein
- Produced by: Assaf Amir
- Starring: Hadas Yaron; Chaim Sharir; Ido Samuel; Irit Sheleg; Yiftach Klein; Hila Feldman
- Cinematography: Asaf Sudry
- Edited by: Sharon Elovic
- Music by: Yitzhak Azulay
- Production companies: Reshet Broadcasting; Avi Chai fund Sundance
- Distributed by: Sony Pictures Classics (US)
- Release dates: 1 September 2012 (Venice); 18 October 2012 (Israel)
- Running time: 90 minutes
- Country: Israel
- Language: Hebrew
- Box office: $2.4 million

Fill the Void (Hebrew: למלא את החלל - lemale et ha'ḥalal) is a 2012 Israeli drama film written and directed by Rama Burshtein. It focuses on life among the Haredi Jewish community in Tel Aviv, Israel. Hadas Yaron stars as Shira Mendelman, an 18-year-old girl who is pressured to marry her older sister's husband, following the death of her sister in childbirth.

The film required a lengthy production period, taking over a year for the casting to be completed, and another year and three months for editing. Burshtein, who was doubtful as to how much of the process would be completed, took a step-by-step approach, focusing first on the writing, then on accumulating enough funding for the project, followed by the filming and editing. Burshtein became the first Haredi Jewish woman to direct a film intended for wide distribution. The film premiered at the 69th Venice Film Festival on 1 September 2012, and was later released in the United States on 24 May 2013.

Fill the Void was well received by critics for its depiction of Haredi Jews and their lifestyle. It won seven Israeli Academy Awards, and lead actress Hadas Yaron won Best Actress for her portrayal of Shira at the Venice Film Festival.

== Plot ==
Shira Mendelman, an 18-year-old Hasidic girl living in Tel Aviv, is looking forward to an arranged marriage with a young man whom she likes. However, on Purim, her family suffers a tragedy when Shira's older sister Esther dies in childbirth. Shira's father subsequently delays the engagement so as not to have to deal with an empty house so soon after Esther's death. Esther's husband, Yochay, begins to regularly bring their son, Mordechai, to the Mendelman's house, where Shira cares for him.

One day, Yochay's mother approaches Shira's mother, Rivka, about the possibility of Yochay remarrying, believing it to be best for Mordechai. She plans to suggest an offer from a widow in Belgium. Rivka is distraught by the idea of Mordechai being taken out of the country, and suggests that Yochay marry Shira instead. He and Shira both initially oppose the prospect, though he eventually warms to it, and she agrees to take it into consideration on learning that her previous engagement has been called off due to her father's delays. However, she had hoped for a younger husband; her dream was of someone who would discover married life for the first time together with her.

Shortly afterwards, Frieda, a friend of Esther who has never received any marriage proposals, tells Shira that Esther would have preferred that Yochay marry her in the event of her death. As a result, Shira tells Yochay that Frieda is more suitable, which he takes as an affront.

Shira and Yochay remain distant from one another afterwards, and he announces that he plans to move with Mordechai to marry the widow in Belgium. Shira, pressured by her family, agrees to go forward with the engagement to Yochay, believing it to be the best scenario for everyone. However, the rabbi realizes that Shira is half-hearted, and he refuses to condone the marriage.

Time passes, and Shira eventually concludes that she was meant to be with Yochay and his baby. She approaches the rabbi and asks again that she and Yochay be married, and he agrees this time. The film closes with their wedding.

== Cast ==
- Hadas Yaron as Shira Mendelman
- Chaim Sharir as Aharon Mendelman
- Ido Samuel as Yossi Mendelman
- Irit Sheleg as Rivka Mendelman
- Yiftach Klein as Yochay Goldberg
- Hila Feldman as Freida
- Razia Israeli as Aunt Hanna
- Renana Raz as Esther Goldberg
- Yael Tal as Shiffi
- Michael David Weigl as Shtreicher
- Neta Moran as Bilha
- Melech Thal as Rabbi

== Production ==
=== Writing and themes ===
Fill the Void was written and directed by Rama Burshtein, who, in the course of its production, became the first Haredi Jewish woman to direct a film intended to be viewed outside of the Haredi community. In doing so, she hoped to create a greater understanding of the Haredi community, in part by dispelling the common misconceptions that women are often forced into arranged marriages; despite the differences in structure, the woman is always given the final say in whom she marries. Burshtein also deliberately avoided depicting a divide between the religious and secular Jews, a theme that commonly appears in films about the Haredim. She explained:

As a people, we are thousands of years old, and we exist without that conflict of the secular and the religious. The truth is that most of us do not want to leave our communities. All of those films were always about someone either trying to get out or someone from the outside trying to get in, and it was very important for me to say that we also just exist and feel and love and struggle and hurt by ourselves, not always because we're in conflict.

In her director's notes, Burshtein wrote, "I love Jane Austen. She's romantic, intelligent, and full of humor. ... The parallel is also quite obvious in that 'Fill the Void' takes place in a world where the rules are rigid and clear. The characters are not looking for some way to burst out of that world. Instead, they are trying to find a way to live within it." Critics noted the similarities between Austen's characters and those in Fill the Void, and Stephanie Merry from The Washington Post likened the character of Frieda to Charlotte Lucas from Pride and Prejudice. Frieda, like Charlotte, has never had any marriage prospects, and is the subject of others' pity as a result.

Merry suggested that, regardless of cultural differences, the story is universal, due to "its themes of loss and family loyalty, not to mention the realization that life may not align with our idealized expectations". Boston Globe correspondent Peter Keough agreed that the "themes of love and loss, self-sacrifice and self-preservation" are applicable to audiences both in and outside the Haredi community. John Podhoretz, an editor of The Weekly Standard, was surprised that the "state of grace" featured prominently in Fill the Void, perceiving it to be an uncommon concept in Jewish movies.

=== Casting ===
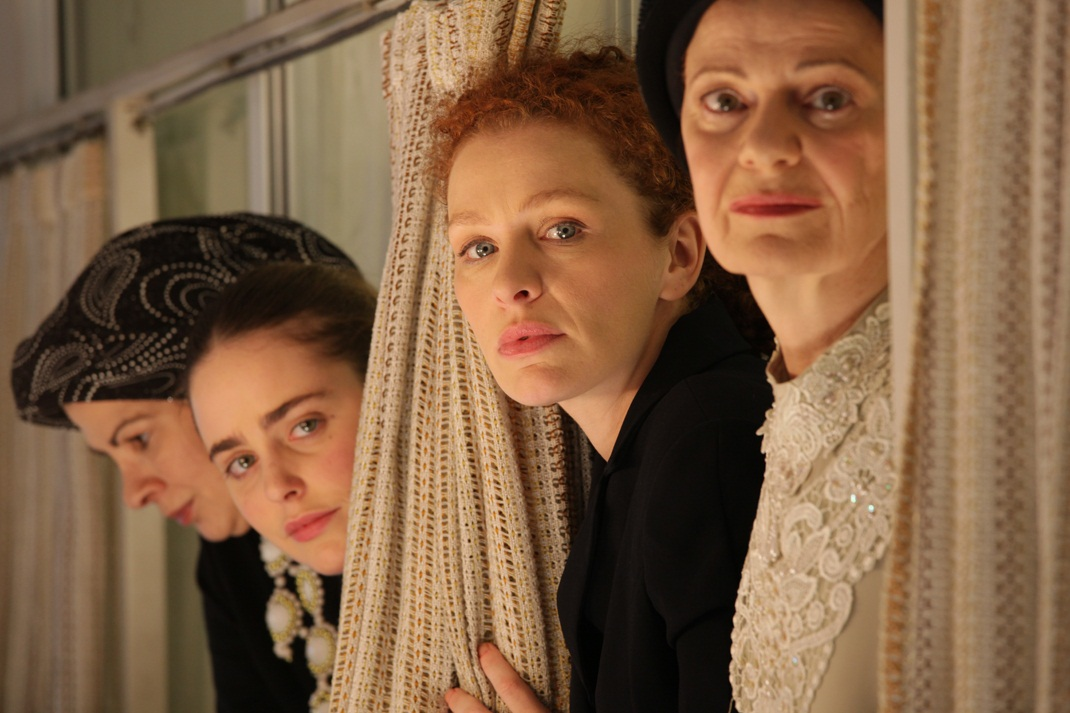
From left to right: Irit Sheleg as Rivka, Hadas Yaron as Shira, Hila Feldman as Frieda, and Razia Israeli as Aunt Hanna

Casting the film took a full year to complete, largely because, according to Burshtein, she "didn't know what [she] wanted". She initially considered using "regular people" with no background in acting, before realizing that "non-actors couldn't handle the complexities of their characters".

Israeli actress Hadas Yaron, then aged 20, was cast for the role of Shira, the protagonist of the film. She commented that her character "is much more naïve at 18 than I was when I was 18, and there was something so special about that, and it was like going back to the basics". Yaron was unfamiliar with Haredi practice prior to participating in Fill the Void. In order to become better acquainted with Shira's lifestyle, she started memorizing all of the Hebrew blessings, saying: "There's something so beautiful about it because you're being so grateful all the time for everything you do and hoping that everything works out okay, and I started doing those blessings every day, and it sounds silly, but it helps you feel that you are closer to the character."

Yiftach Klein was cast to act alongside her as Yochay Goldberg. Burshtein remarked that Klein "is a big star in Israel, and has played a pimp, a homosexual, and a cop (among many other roles); so, I was not sure you could really believe him as this Orthodox guy. But his audition, and then his chemistry with Hadas, were just perfect".

"The extras in the film are all from the [Orthodox community]. But among the main actors, only the rabbi and the matchmaker are religious; all the rest are secular professional actors."

— Rama Burshtein in a 2013 interview.

Additional cast members include Hila Feldman as Frieda, Irit Sheleg as Rivka Mendelman, Chaim Sharir as Aharon Mendelman, Razia Israeli as Aunt Hanna, Renana Raz as Esther Goldberg, Ido Samuel as Yossi Mendelman, Yael Tal as Shiffi, Michael David Weigl as Shtreicher, Neta Moran as Bilha, and Melech Thal as Rabbi.

As most of the main cast was not from the Haredi community, Burshtein instructed them to attend all of the major events that take place within the film, including a wedding and a circumcision. Yaron commented: "[At the wedding], it was so intense, and [the bride] was crying, and she was really in it, and I felt like she was my sister because I'm going to be like her in a while. So, it was really helpful to experience all these things, and to see how it is and to feel a part of it actually."

=== Costumes ===
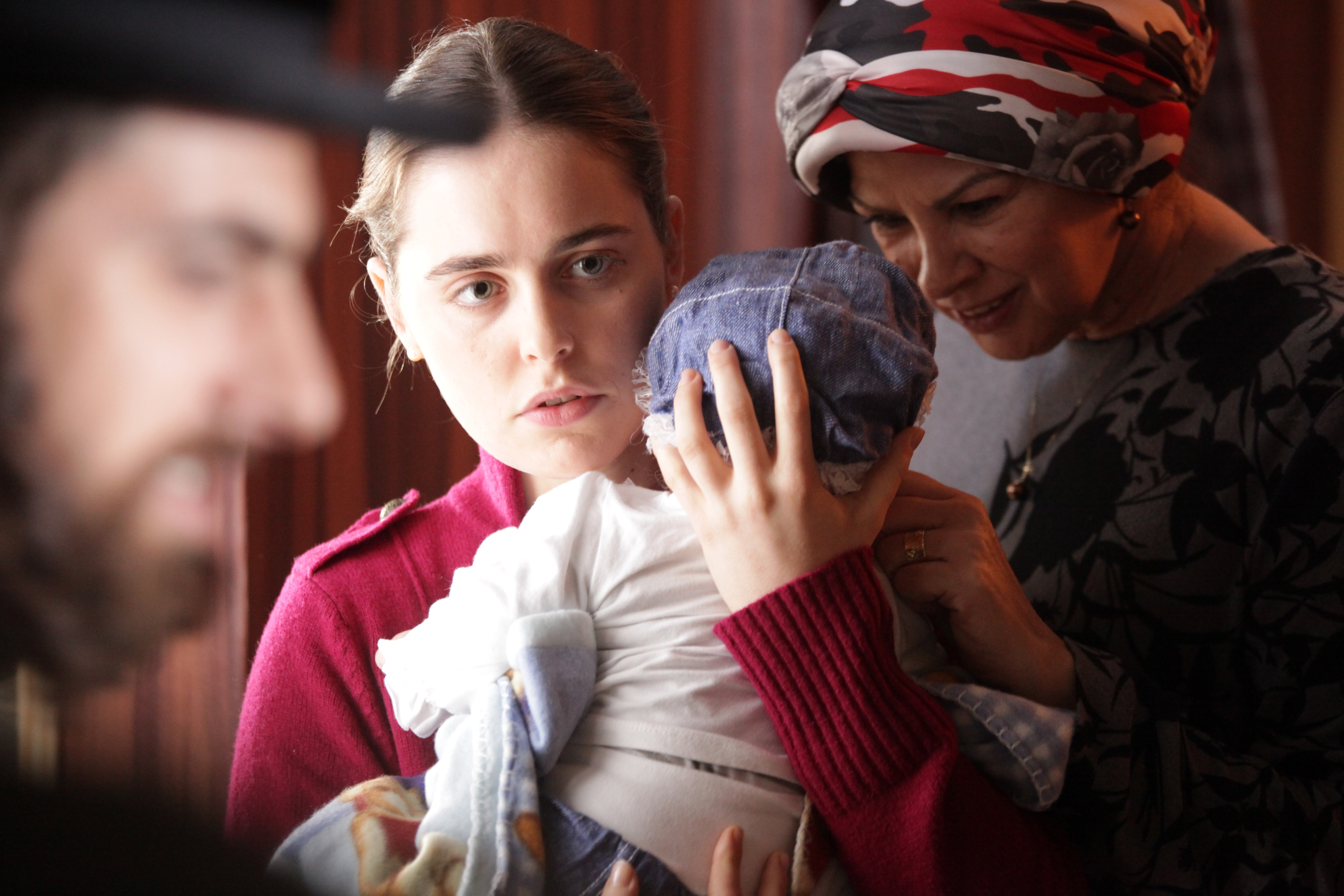
Hadas Yaron and Irit Sheleg in costume

Chani Gurewitz oversaw costume design for the film, and much of the low budget was spent on the clothing worn by the actors, which was designed to be soft and colorful. Hasidic style of dress was used, including headgear and heavy attire worn by the males and modest dresses and head coverings worn by the females.

=== Filming ===
Burshtein found creating a believable relationship between Yiftach Klein and Hadas Yaron to be one of the more challenging aspects of the production. She hoped to keep the relationship between Yochay and Shira enigmatic, with a strong undercurrent of tension, throughout the film. One method of doing so was ensuring that the actors never touched while filming. She explained, "That's how we see the enigma—the power of wanting and then restraining. The restraining is the power. The passion cannot exist if you have it all the time—the passion is only for something that you don't have. You have to work to keep the passion. Judaism is all about that." Burshtein considered including a scene in which Shira and Yochay kissed about halfway through the movie but decided against it, believing that the energy would be lost.

Yaron had never acted in a role with a romance before and at certain points found it difficult to portray the emotions her character felt when interacting with Yochay. Cinematographer Asaf Sudry assisted in conveying to the audience that the marriage between the lead characters would eventually take place by frequently using sunlight for their scenes.

In general, Sudry designed the visual effects in Fill the Void to create a claustrophobic view point. Blurred backgrounds were often utilized to focus on the faces of the characters, and most of the long takes were shot from an interior perspective. Sudry used Arri Alexa cameras and short-range lenses with limited camera movements to maintain the effect. Burshtein explained that this was done to illustrate that "the heart is very colorful and very small" and that "we as human beings only see fragments of the big picture; God sees the whole thing!" While a "documentary feel" was retained throughout most of the film's duration, the style was switched for the wedding scene to create a euphoric atmosphere similar to those used in productions by Terrence Malick and David Lynch.

The film relied on subtext, requiring the actors to "read between the lines" for a number of their scenes. Most of the sentiments are understated, and Burshtein avoided having any of the characters break down or openly become angry when pressured. Yaron described a scene between Yochay and Rivka as her favorite, saying, "I think it's because there is so much pain there; it touches you the most when people feel something and try to hide it and you see it."

Following the completion of filming, Burshtein continued to edit the footage for another year and three months until it was declared complete.

=== Music ===
Yitzhak Azulay composed the music played in Fill the Void. He chose primarily melodic and traditional pieces, using them frequently throughout the film. Other soundtrack is composed largely of contemporary Orthodox pop music, and the prayers are "regularly chanted rather than spoken". The song "Im Eshkachech Yerushalayim" (Hebrew: אם אשכחך ירושלים, 'If I Forget Thee Jerusalem') features prominently in the film, playing at all three of the major events: the funeral, the Bris Milah, and the wedding. Azulay used an a cappella version of the song, which is derived from an excerpt of Psalm 137 and expresses the yearnings of the Jewish people in exile following the Babylonian conquest of Jerusalem in 586 BCE: "If I forget you, O Jerusalem, let my right hand wither; Let my tongue stick to my palate if I cease to think of you, if I do not keep Jerusalem in memory even at my happiest hour."

Shira is frequently shown playing the accordion, which Hadas Yaron did not know how to play. She described it as a "very difficult instrument" and stated, "There was so much noise in [one scene]. It was like rrrrrrnnnnngh [as I tried to play], I was faking the melody and it was ugly, very weird stuff. I had to really switch this button [in my head] like don't listen to it and feel what you’'re feeling. It took a while because at the beginning, I was very aware of playing this horrible melody, if you could call it a melody, and I knew I had to feel something. It took a few takes because I thought, 'oh, how could [the crew] listen to that? The cinematographer!' It took a while to ignore that and just be in the moment."

== Reception ==
=== Box office ===
First released in Israel in September 2012, Fill the Void grossed $59,164 on its opening weekend. It appeared in three theaters with an average of $19,721 per theater, ranking at #38 in the country. During the film's eight-week release, it appeared in 64 theaters and reached a figure of $1,468,587 for total domestic gross. It was later released in the United States in May 2013, grossing $2,418,587 worldwide.

=== Critical reviews ===
Fill the Void received generally positive reviews, garnering an 89% "fresh" rating based from 74 reviews on review aggregator website Rotten Tomatoes; the consensus states: "Graceful, complex, and beautifully layered, Fill the Void offers a sympathetic portrait of an insulated culture by exploring universal themes." Several critics compared the female characters to Jane Austen's novels. The Weekly Standard editor John Podhoretz opined, "I don't know when I've ever seen a film as eerily perfect in tone and taste as Fill the Void...There isn't a moment when Burshtein goes wrong, goes melodramatic, goes didactic, goes false. Working as a woman of faith in a medium looked on with understandable suspicion and skepticism by those who believe as she does, Rama Burshtein has made a work of art of overwhelming beauty and impact." The New York Post critic Farran Smith Nehme disagreed, writing, "While the social milieu is nicely realized, other parts of the drama are not. Too often Burshtein cuts off a scene prematurely, darting away just as the crucial moment of emotion or confrontation appears."

The Boston Globe correspondent Peter Keough gave the film a highly favorable review:

Films tend to confirm, not confront, stereotypes. Not so Israeli director Rama Burshtein's exquisitely acted, radiantly shot, and delicately nuanced "Fill the Void," a melodrama set in the ultra-Orthodox Haredi Jewish community of Tel Aviv. By bringing to life complex and sympathetic characters in a precisely observed setting and social framework, and by presenting that isolated world as a microcosm, Burshtein has achieved a gripping film without victims or villains, an ambiguous tragedy drawing on universal themes of love and loss, self-sacrifice and self-preservation.

Deborah Young from The Hollywood Reporter also published a good review, adding that it was "more realistic than beautiful, though when the story calls for it she has no trouble injecting poetry into a scene." A review in Slant Magazine was equally positive, adding that the film used "long static takes, restricting her shots largely to interiors and strategically alternating between depth staging and blurry backgrounds, Rama Burshtein brings a sense of inevitability and constriction to the insular world of Israeli Hassidic Judaism." More broadly, Screen International suggested that director "Burshtein paints a perfect bubble that can last only as long as it has no contact with the world outside (no secular presence is allowed in here)."

Additionally, critics praised the respect shown to the film's portrayal of Orthodox Jews. Jane Esiner from The New York Times suggested that, "While the film may deliver a message at odds with contemporary feminism in the eyes of some critics, the movie portrays female characters with a strength that is both subtle and believable." A. O. Scott, also from The New York Times, added, "Their routines are dominated by prayer, ritual observance and obedience to Jewish law, but their world does not seem narrow and austere. On the contrary, it is at times almost unbearably full of feeling and significance."

Scott further commended the acting by Hadas Yaron, saying, "Shira is modest and sensible, forthright with her opinions and discreet about expressing emotion, but the way Ms. Yaron composes her features—and the way she is lighted by Ms. Burshtein and the cinematographer, Asaf Sudry—seems to offer direct access to her soul." Likewise, Los Angeles Times film critic Kenneth Turan found Yaron's performance "exceptional". By contrast, Peter Cavanese from Pleasanton Weekly disliked the idea of Shira marrying under the circumstances in the film and wrote that she "comes across as temperamentally battered by her mother and her potential husband, who is himself slow to see the wisdom of marrying Shira".

=== Awards ===
The film won seven Ophir Awards, the Israeli equivalent of the American Oscars, including one for best director and one for best film. It was selected to compete for the Golden Lion award at the 69th Venice International Film Festival, and Hadas Yaron won the Volpi Cup for Best Actress. In September 2012, the film was selected as the Israeli entry for the Best Foreign Language Oscar at the 85th Academy Awards, but it did not make the final shortlist.

Award	Category	Recipient	Result	Source
Ophir Awards	Best Feature Film		Won	
Ophir Awards	Best Director	Rama Burshtein	Won	
Ophir Awards	Best Actress	Hadas Yaron	Won	
Ophir Awards	Best Supporting Actor	Chaim Sharir	Nominated	
Ophir Awards	Best Supporting Actress	Irit Sheleg	Won	
Ophir Awards	Best Cinematography	Asaf Sudry	Won	
Ophir Awards	Best Editing	Sharon Elovic	Nominated	
Ophir Awards	Best Casting	Michal Koren	Nominated	
Ophir Awards	Best Screenplay	Rama Burshtein	Won	
Ophir Awards	Best Production Design	Uri Aminov	Nominated	
Ophir Awards	Best Costume Design	Chani Gurevich	Nominated	
Ophir Awards	Best Original Soundtrack	Moti Hefetz, Aviv Aldema	Nominated	
Ophir Awards	Best Makeup	Eti Ben Nun	Won	
Venice Film Festival	Best Actress	Hadas Yaron	Won	
Venice Film Festival	Golden Lion Award		Nominated	
European Film Awards	Carlo Di Palma European Cinematographer Award	Asaf Sudry	Won	

== See also ==
- List of submissions to the 85th Academy Awards for Best Foreign Language Film
- List of Israeli submissions for the Academy Award for Best Foreign Language Film
