= Sasson Gabai =

Israeli actor (born 1947)

- ששון גבאי
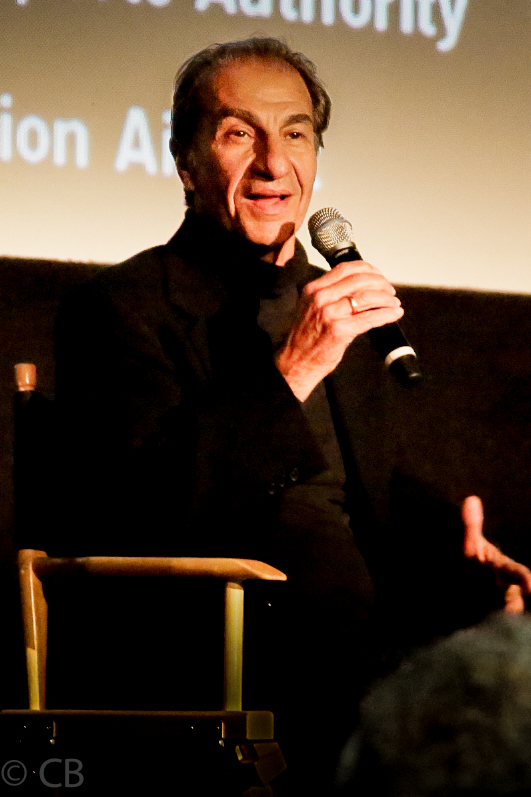
- Gabai at the Atlanta Jewish Film Festival 2014 screening of Kidon
- Born: 24 November 1947 (age 78); Baghdad, Iraq
- Occupation: Actor
- Years active: 1973–present

Sasson Gabai (or Gabay; Hebrew: ששון גבאי; born 24 November 1947) is an Israeli actor. He is the winner of an Ophir Award, Asia Pacific Screen Award (nominated), European Film Awards and Jerusalem Film Festival in 2007 as Best Actor in the highly acclaimed Israeli film The Band's Visit.

== Biography ==
Gabai was born in 1947 in Baghdad, Iraq, to a Baghdadi Jewish family. During his childhood he immigrated together with his family to Israel. After serving his mandatory military service in the Israel Defense Forces, he studied theater and psychology at the Tel Aviv University. After graduating, he began playing in the Khan Theater in Michael Alfreds group. Afterwards, he played in several stage productions at the Hacameri Theater, the Be'er Sheva Theater and the Beit Lessin Theater. He is one of the permanent staff members at the Beit Lessin Theater. Among the many plays he participated in were Servant of Two Masters, Catch-22, Who's Afraid of Virginia Woolf?, and Rain Man. Gabai also played in the 1989 children's musical Peter Pan as Captain Hook.

Through the years, Gabai played in various Israeli and international films: Sipurei Tel-Aviv;Time for Cherries, for which he won an Ophir award; Rambo III; the Escape from Saudi Arabia; Made in Israel; Aviva, My Love and many others.

Gabai has also been on Israeli television in series The Haim Neighborhood (שכונת חיים), Siton (סיטון), Late Night Stories (סיפורים לשעת לילה מאוחרת), and in the drama series The Kastner Trial (משפט קסטנר) in which he played Rudolf Kastner. He was a host in the comedy series Zehu Ze!, and played a cameo role in the popular comedy series Krovim Krovim, in addition to many other productions.

== Career highlights ==
- In 2007 Gabai starred in the critically acclaimed film The Band's Visit, a role for which he won an Ophir Award and a European Film Award.
- In 2008 he played the role of Ahmed Hassan al-Bakr in the American TV mini-series House of Saddam.
- In 2009 Gabai began to play the lead role in the TV series Polishuk, a role for which he won an Israeli Television Academy Award in the category of best actor in a comedy series.
- In 2011 he played the lead role in a film Restoration, a role for which he was nominated for an Ophir Award. He won the IFFI Best Actor Award (Male) at the 42nd International Film Festival of India.
- Gabai also played one of the leading roles in the highly acclaimed Israeli TV series Shtisel, which to date, has run for three seasons (2013-2021). Gabai played the role of Nuchem Shtisel, the paternal uncle of the main protagonist, Akiva Shtisel. Nuchem is also the brother of Shulem Shtisel and father of Libbi Shtisel, Akiva's first cousin, and love interest. Nuchem is an Antwerp-based travel agent who shows up at Shulem's apartment with his daughter Libbi, at the beginning of Season 2. One of Nuchem's first lines in the show is when he explains why he is late, blaming the immigration/custom officials at Ben Gurion airport, and calling them Reshaim Arrurim (Yiddish vernacular for "accursed evil people"). Reshaim Arrurim is a line Nuchem reprises to great comedic effect, at the slightest perceived slight, throughout the season.
- It was initially announced on 28 February 2018 that Gabai would reprise his role as Tewfiq in the Broadway adaptation of The Band's Visit in the summer of 2018. The lead producer of The Band's Visit, Orin Wolf, confirmed the news in a press conference on 10 June, following the 72nd Annual Tony Awards (in which The Band's Visit won ten awards, including Best Musical). The news was later confirmed by Broadway.com.

He has acted in at least seven different languages: Hebrew, Arabic, Persian, Yiddish, English, French, and Flemish.

== Filmography ==
List of film and television credits
Year	Title	Role	Notes
1973	Or Min Hahefker	Shaya	
1974	Hayeladim Meshchoonat Khaiyim	Sasson	
1987	The Impossible Spy	General Haled	
1988	Rambo III	Mousa Ghani	
1991	Time for Cherries or Cherry Season	Choko	Original title: Onat Haduvdevanim
1991	Not Without My Daughter	Hamid	
1992	Blink of an Eye	Khalil	
1998	Escape: Human Cargo	Suliman Nasir Rasi	TV movie
1999	Delta Force One: The Lost Patrol	Minister Oman	
2001	The Order	Yuri	
2006	Aviva My Love	Oded Zar	
2007	The Band's Visit	Lt. Col. Tawfiq Zacharya	Original title: Bikur Ha-Tizmoret
2008	Hello Goodbye	Police chief	
2008	House of Saddam	President Ahmed Hassan al-Bakr	TV drama
2009–2015	Polishuk	Minister Polishuk	TV series
2011	When Pigs Have Wings	Jafaar	
2011	Restoration	Yaakov Fidelman	Original title: Boker Tov Adon Fidelman
2013	Hunting Elephants	Eliyahu	Original title: Latzud Pilim
2013	Kidon	Yair Yitzhaki (as Sasson Gabay)	
2013–present	Shtisel	Nukhem Shtisel	TV drama series
2014	Gett – The Trial of Viviane Amsallem	Rabbi Shimon	
2018	The Angel	President Anwar Sadat	
2018	The Other Story	Shmolo Abadi	
2018–2020	Stockholm	Amos Barazani	TV dark comedy-drama series
2019	A Brother's Love	Hichem	
2021	Oslo	Shimon Peres	TV movie
2022	Karaoke	Meir	Theatrical Film
2023	My daughter, my love	Shimon	
2024	Kugel	Nukhem Shtisel	TV drama series
2024	Bliss	Sassi	
2024–2025	Tehran	Nissan Yousefzadeh / The Owl	TV series

== Family ==
Gabai resides in Tel Aviv, is married and has five children.
