= Yael Tal =

Israeli actress

- יעל טל
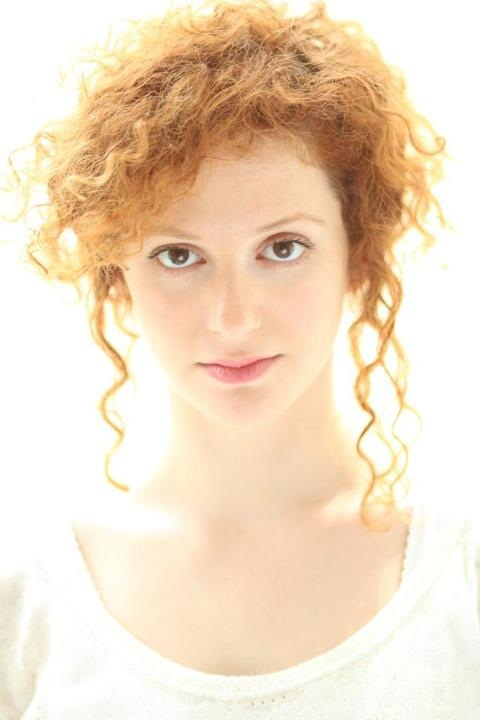
- Born: 26 May 1983 (age 42); Tel Aviv, Israel
- Occupation: Actress
- Years active: Since 2008

Yael Tal (Hebrew: יעל טל; born 26 May 1983 in Tel Aviv) is an Israeli actress, whose work spans film, theater, television and voice acting for animated shows. She is a graduate of Thelma Yellin High School for the Arts and the Yoram Leowinstein performing arts Studio.

== Life and career ==
Yael Tal grew up in Tel Aviv. From 1997 2001 she studied acting at the Thelma Yellin High School for the Arts. In 2007 she graduated from the Yoram Leowinstein performing arts Studio.

=== Theatre ===
In March 2012 Tal could be seen in the theatre play The School for Wifes (בית ספר לנשים). Furthermore, she played Bambi in The new criminals (הפושעים החדשיםהפושעים החדשים).

== Television roles ==
- The Golden Girls (Israeli version)
- Split
- Operation Porcupine
- Room Service
- Bekrov Etzlech
- Virgin Susie and the Holy Sisters from Petah-Tikva

== Movies ==
- Fill the Void (2012)

== Theater ==
- Love Story – Beit Lesin Theater
- A member of the comedy ensemble "Hagdud Ha’ivri" – The Tzavta Theater
- School For Wives (as Aniges) – The Cameri Theater

== Personal life ==
Yael Tal lives with Israeli musician Ido Ofek (Zigo), formerly a member of popular rock groups Dorbanim and Devek, and the two have collaborated on stage as part of the Hagdud Ha'ivri comedy ensemble.
