= Kidon (film) =

2013 spy action comedy film

- Film poster
- Hebrew: כידון
- Directed by: Emmanuel Naccache
- Written by: Emmanuel Naccache
- Produced by: Manuel Munz, Michael Sharfshtein, Moshe Edery, Leon Edery
- Starring: Tomer Sisley, Lionel Abelanski, Kev Adams, Hippolyte Girardot, Bar Refaeli, Sasson Gabai
- Music by: Tom Sharfshtein
- Release date: September 2013 (Haifa Film Festival)
- Running time: 97 minutes
- Country: France/Israel
- Languages: Hebrew and French

Kidon (Hebrew: כידון) is a 2013 French-Israeli spy action comedy film about the Israeli Mossad's attempts to find out who killed Hamas senior military commander Mahmoud Al-Mabhouh in 2010. In real life, Kidon is a secretive Mossad special operations killing unit.

Kidon was written and directed by Emmanuel Naccache. The hotel scenes were filmed at a hotel in Eilat, Israel, standing in for the Dubai hotel where the actual killing took place.

When the family of Al-Mabhouh learned that in one of the scenes his character drinks alcohol and submits to Israeli "temptress" Bar Refaeli, the family said it would sue to stop the film's distribution arguing that it hurt the Hamas commander's reputation.

== Cast ==
- Tomer Sisley as Daniel
- Lionel Abelanski as Eric
- Kev Adams as Facebook
- Hippolyte Girardot as Monsieur Garnier
- Élodie Hesme as Solène
- Bar Refaeli as Einav
- Sasson Gabai as Yair Yitzhaki (as Sasson Gabay)

== Accolades ==
Kidon was nominated for the 2013 Ophir Awards of the Israeli Film Academy for Best Actress (Reymonde Amsallem) and Best Sound (Itai Elohev and Gil Toren). The film was also voted "Best Film Audience Choice Award" at the SERET 2014 film festival.
