= Shtisel =

Israeli television drama series

- שטיסל
- Genre: Drama
- Created by: Ori Elon; Yehonatan Indursky
- Directed by: Alon Zingman
- Starring: Dov Glickman; Michael Aloni; Neta Riskin; Shira Haas; Sasson Gabai; Hadas Yaron; Eliana Shechter; Zohar Strauss; Ayelet Zurer
- Country of origin: Israel
- Original languages: Hebrew; Yiddish
- No. of seasons: 3
- No. of episodes: 33

Production
- Running time: 41–57 minutes
- Production company: yes

Original release
- Network: yes Oh (Israel); Netflix (International)
- Release: 29 June 2013 – 14 February 2021

Shtisel (Hebrew: שטיסל) is an Israeli television drama series about a fictional Ashkenazi orthodox family living in Geula, Jerusalem. Created and written by Ori Elon and Yehonatan Indursky, the series premiered on 29 June 2013 on yes Oh. It commenced distribution via the online streaming service Netflix in 2018. The first two seasons have 12 episodes per season, and the third season has 9 episodes.

In May 2019, the show was renewed for a third season, though filming was delayed due to the COVID-19 pandemic. A trailer was released in September, revealing that Season 3 is set seven years after the death of Akiva's mother (six years after the events of the first episode). Season 3 premiered on 20 December 2020, and became available on Netflix starting 25 March 2021. Due to the end of the streaming contract between Yes Studios and Netflix, all three seasons were removed from Netflix on 25 March 2023.

== Overview ==
The series follows the lives of Shulem Shtisel (Dov Glickman), the Shtisel patriarch and a rabbi at the local cheder, and other members of his family. Shtisel is set in a Haredi, Internet-free neighborhood. The community follows strict Haredi customs, and violating the norms often causes chaos within the family. However, the characters who are more open to a secular lifestyle reflect Geula's moderation in comparison to their neighbors in Mea She'arim, the adjacent community known for even harsher religious fundamentalism.

== Cast ==
- Dov Glickman as Shulem Shtisel
- Michael Aloni as Akiva Shtisel
- Neta Riskin as Giti Weiss
- Shira Haas as Ruchami Weiss / Tonik
- Sarel Piterman as Zvi Arye Shtisel
- Zohar Strauss as Lippe Weiss
- Moon Shavit as Esti Gottlieb
- Orly Silbersatz Banai as Aliza Gvili
- Ayelet Zurer as Elisheva Rotstein
- Sasson Gabai as Nukhem Shtisel
- Gal Fishel as Yosa'le Weiss
- Ori Ilovitz as Haim'ke Weiss
- Hadas Yaron as Libbi Shtisel
- Eliana Shechter as Tovi Shtisel
- Daniella Kertesz as Racheli Warburg
- Hanna Rieber as Malka Shtisel (grandmother, season 1)
- Lea Koenig as Malka Shtisel (grandmother, season 2, recast due to death of Rieber)
- Yoav Rotman as Hanina Tonik
- Maya Maron as Hadassa Levi

== Plot ==
=== Season 1 ===
Akiva Shtisel, a 26-year-old, single Haredi man, lives with his widower father, Shulem Shtisel. After starting work as a cheder teacher, Akiva falls in love with the twice widowed Elisheva Rotstein, the mother of a student in his class. He asks a matchmaker to set up a meeting for them, much to the chagrin of Shulem, who wants Akiva to wed a never-married young Haredi woman. Elisheva and Akiva meet but she refuses to continue. Shulem urges Akiva to meet with 19-year-old Esti Gottlieb. On their second meeting, Akiva, still in love with Elisheva, says he is not yet ready for marriage, and Esti starts to cry. Faced with guilt, Akiva proposes marriage to Esti, and they get engaged.

Giti Weiss, Shulem's daughter and Akiva's sister, says goodbye to her husband Lippe Weiss, who flies to Argentina for six months as part of his job as a kosher butcher. Lippe's boss tells Giti that her husband has run away with a Gentile woman. A disgraced Giti looks to provide for her five children, first by working as a babysitter for a secular woman, and then exchanging money at home. Though she still loves him, she confesses the hardship her husband has put them through to her eldest daughter Ruchami, who grows resentful of Lippe. Later feeling guilty, he decides to return home, and struggles to find forgiveness from Ruchami. Giti refuses to discuss the past, but her anger shows up in other ways.

Zvi Arye, Giti and Akiva's brother, competes for a teaching job at the kolel, where he studies hard, but he doesn't get the job.

Grandmother Malka, Shulem's mother, lives in a nursing home, and is exposed to television for the first time in her life, which Zvi Arye and Shulem find abhorrent, and they come up with many ways to prevent her from viewing it. She maintains a genial frenemies relationship with a neighbor.

Akiva finds a job as a painter. He paints for Leib Fuchs, a well-known Haredi artist. Their agreement consists of Akiva painting for him, and Fuchs selling the paintings as if they were his own.

Shulem has a relationship (he eats her cooking at the cheder and in her home) with Aliza, a divorced Haredi who is the secretary at his cheder. However, his refusal to clarify his intentions with her motivates her to look elsewhere. This eventually prompts Shulem to do some matchmaking of his own.

Akiva, still harboring doubt about his engagement, consults with his maternal uncle, Sucher, who cancelled a match and has remained single all his life. His uncle tells Akiva to ask Elisheva if she loves him. In an emotional conversation, she tells him that she is too old for him, and refuses him once more. Despite this, he informs Esti's father that he does not love Esti, and Esti's father angrily cancels the engagement. The enraged Shulem expels Akiva from his home. Akiva sleeps in different places, until Shulem and Akiva reconcile.

Akiva continues to contact Elisheva, and ultimately, she does admit to loving him. Akiva gets her to consent to become engaged by promising a six-month engagement and taking it slowly. However, when the engagement contract is signed, Akiva makes it for only one month. He paints a portrait of her, and realizes he desires immediate marriage. Elisheva would prefer to move to London and escape the expectations of their community. After Akiva asks Shulem for advice, and, in so doing, reveals the true confines of their engagement, Shulem visits Elisheva in secret, and explicitly tells her to leave Akiva alone. Elisheva abruptly removes her son Israel from school one day, and calls Akiva from the airport, saying she is leaving, and their relationship is over. She reveals Shulem visited her. This leads to a rift, and Akiva leaving home once again.

Suddenly, the family is confronted with a crisis as Malka Shtisel suffers an accident by falling down a staircase when trying to watch her favourite TV show downstairs, after having given up on her own TV after the machinations of her son, Shulem. She incurs a serious life-threatening head injury, becoming unconscious and being admitted to the ICU. Concerned she might die, the family comes together to support her.

=== Season 2 ===
Shulem's younger brother, Nukhem, and Nukhem's daughter, Libbi, arrive in Jerusalem to visit the ailing matriarch Malka and seek a match for Libbi. Akiva and Libbi become friends and begin to consider the possibility of marrying, but some family members, especially Nukhem, object because they are cousins. Akiva is now exhibiting his paintings at a gallery, and Libbi worries that he will get so swept up in his art that he will forget to daven. Nukhem and Libbi set the condition that Akiva must give up painting if he wishes to become engaged to Libbi; Akiva agrees, but later breaks the promise, prompting Libbi to break off the engagement.

Giti and Lippe, who are expecting a sixth baby, consider the possibility of naming him "Zelig", in return for a payment from a childless widow who wishes to have a child named after her deceased husband. Giti impulsively offers to name the child "Zelig" without payment; unbeknownst to her, Lippe does accept a sum of money from the widow. When Giti is bothered by the widow's intrusive behavior at the hospital when she is giving birth, she decides that she wants to name the baby something else, but at the bris, Lippe names him Zelig. Their marriage becomes troubled again; slowly, they work through their problems, and Giti opens a restaurant with a sum of money that Lippe made on the stock market.

Ruchami, aged fifteen, befriends a devout yeshiva student, Hanina, and brings him food so that he can study late into the night. After Ruchami overhears her parents talking about how gossip about the Weiss family may affect her marital prospects, she elopes with Hanina, and they marry in front of witnesses at a café. Ruchami's parents are shocked, and they, especially Giti, attempt to separate the young couple. Eventually, Giti persuades Lippe to tell Hanina that Ruchami wants a divorce, and a date for the delivery of a get is arranged. But after Giti meets Hanina by chance at her restaurant, and gets to know him slightly, she relents.

At the end of the season, Giti and Lippe reconcile with each other, with Ruchami, and with Hanina. Ruchami and Hanina plan a conventional, festive wedding with her parents' blessing; despite Ruchami's best efforts, Hanina's estranged father does not appear. Libbi realizes that she wants to marry Akiva, without conditions.

=== Season 3 ===
Akiva is now a widower with a baby daughter, Dvora'le. We learn that Libbi has died in the interval between Seasons 2 and 3. Akiva sees visions of Libbi, and carries on intense conversations with her as he tries to find his way through grief. Nukhem, also grieving and severely depressed, goes to live with his brother, Shulem.

Sucher comes to visit, with a surprise announcement: He has re-connected with Nechama, his ex-fiancée from decades ago, and they are once again engaged. Before they can marry, Sucher dies suddenly. Shulem tentatively courts Nechama, but she becomes engaged to Nukhem instead, giving him a new lease on life. Having won the lottery, Nechama donates all of her winnings to Shulem's cheder.

Akiva is agonized to learn that three of his paintings of Libbi have been sold to a collector, while he hesitated over granting his permission; he considers them too personal to sell. He meets the collector, Racheli, and attempts to recover them, but she will agree only if he paints her another three paintings equally good — however, his attempt to do so fails to satisfy her. After a mix-up when a friend of Akiva's picks up the wrong child from day care, social services investigate Akiva and temporarily remove Dvora'le from his care. Advised to get married as quickly as possible to prove that he can make a good home for Dvora'le, Akiva abruptly marries Racheli, and the two of them successfully put on a charade for social services. The attraction between Akiva and Racheli is real, but the relationship becomes even more complicated when Racheli reveals that she has bipolar disorder. Moreover, Akiva still pines for Libbi.

Ruchami is now happily married to Hanina and working as her grandfather's secretary, but she longs for a child. Her first pregnancy ended disastrously, in a medically necessary abortion, and she has been advised that she cannot safely carry a pregnancy to term, having only a 1/1000 chance of survival. She and Hanina explore the possibility of having a child through a surrogate, with Ruchami faking a pregnancy so that the surrogacy can remain completely confidential. Hanina reluctantly agrees, after taking counsel from a rabbi and finding inspiration in a pertinent text. But Hanina reveals his ambivalence about surrogacy, causing Ruchami to secretly remove her IUD and conceive a child, not telling Hanina until the pregnancy is well advanced.

Meanwhile, Giti and Lippe's second child, Yosa'le, is beginning to date. He falls in love with the first girl he meets, not realizing that he had mixed one Shira up with another in the hotel lobby — and the girl he fell for is not the one his parents had in mind, but a Sephardi Algerian university student of whom they would not approve. Under parental pressure, Yosa'le meets and becomes engaged to the Shira Levinson who was picked out for him, but it becomes clear that they do not have much in common. Eventually, he re-connects with the first girl he met, Shira Levi, and breaks his engagement with the other Shira.

At the end of the season, Yosa'le becomes engaged to Shira Levi; Akiva moves in with Racheli; Ruchami can't breathe, is rushed to the hospital, and undergoes surgery delivering the baby. As Akiva and Nuchem leave Shulem's home, Shulem insists upon a final goodbye beverage, during which he expresses that "the deceased are always with us". That penultimate scene becomes dream-like, with various dead relatives sitting at the table (Libbi, Devorah, and Shulem's mother, etc.) and interacting with the living relatives. In the last scene, Ruchami is on a hospital bed, is handed a healthy baby, and breaks the fourth wall to look at the viewer shedding a tear.

== Reception ==
The series is considered innovative for its treatment of an irregular group of Haredi Jews, by stripping them of their political associations and offering a true-to-life portrayal.

In October 2016, it was announced that Amazon Studios was planning to remake Shtisel, set in Brooklyn, New York, under the title Emmis.

In May 2019, Shtisel was renewed for a third season. In May 2019, a dispute with the Israeli Actors' Association delayed the signing of contracts for the third series. In August 2019, producer Dikla Barkai said, "We cannot confirm Season 3 yet. There are many reasons. Let's hope. We are thinking positively. I would say it will."

In April 2020, series producer Barkai confirmed that a third season of Shtisel had been due to begin filming in May 2020, but would have to be postponed on account of the COVID-19 pandemic. Production resumed in June and a trailer was later released in September.

On 17 December 2020, an online world première event for Season 3, Episode 1, was hosted by the Temple Emanu-El Streicker Center. Season 3 started streaming on Netflix on 25 March 2021.

Rare for a television series, Shtisel was accorded an episode-by-episode study of its themes and structure by a Canadian film scholar, Maurice Yacowar. "Reading Shtisel" covered seasons one and two, "After Shtisel" season three and the writers' intervening series, Autonomies.

== Awards ==
The first season of the series was nominated in 12 categories at the Israeli Television Academy Awards 2013, including two nominations for each of best actor and actress in a drama series – Dov Glickman and Michael Aloni, as well as for Ayelet Zorer and Neta Riskin. At the ceremony, held on 24 January 2014, the series won 11 awards: for Best Drama Series, Best Actor in a Drama Series (Dov Glickman), Drama Director (Alon Singman), Drama Screenplay (Uri Alon and Jonathan Indursky), Design Costumes, Make-Up, Photography, Original Music (Avi Belleli), Soundtrack, Artistic Management, and Editing.

At the Israeli Television Academy Award ceremony in 2015, the second season won directing awards for the drama series (Alon Singman), acting awards in the actor and actress category (Dov Glickman in his second win with the series, and Neta Riskin), original music, art design, and costumes.

== Developments ==
On 4 August 2016, Amazon Prime Video acquired the American remake of the series with Etan Cohen set to direct, write, and produce the series with Marta Kauffman's Okay Midnight production company.

In 2024 a prequel to Shtisel called Kugel was released with Sasson Gabai starring as Nukhem Shtisel.

== See also ==
- Israeli television
- Haredim and Zionism
- Culture of Israel
