= Maya Kenig =

Israeli film director, writer, film editor and actress

- מאיה קניג
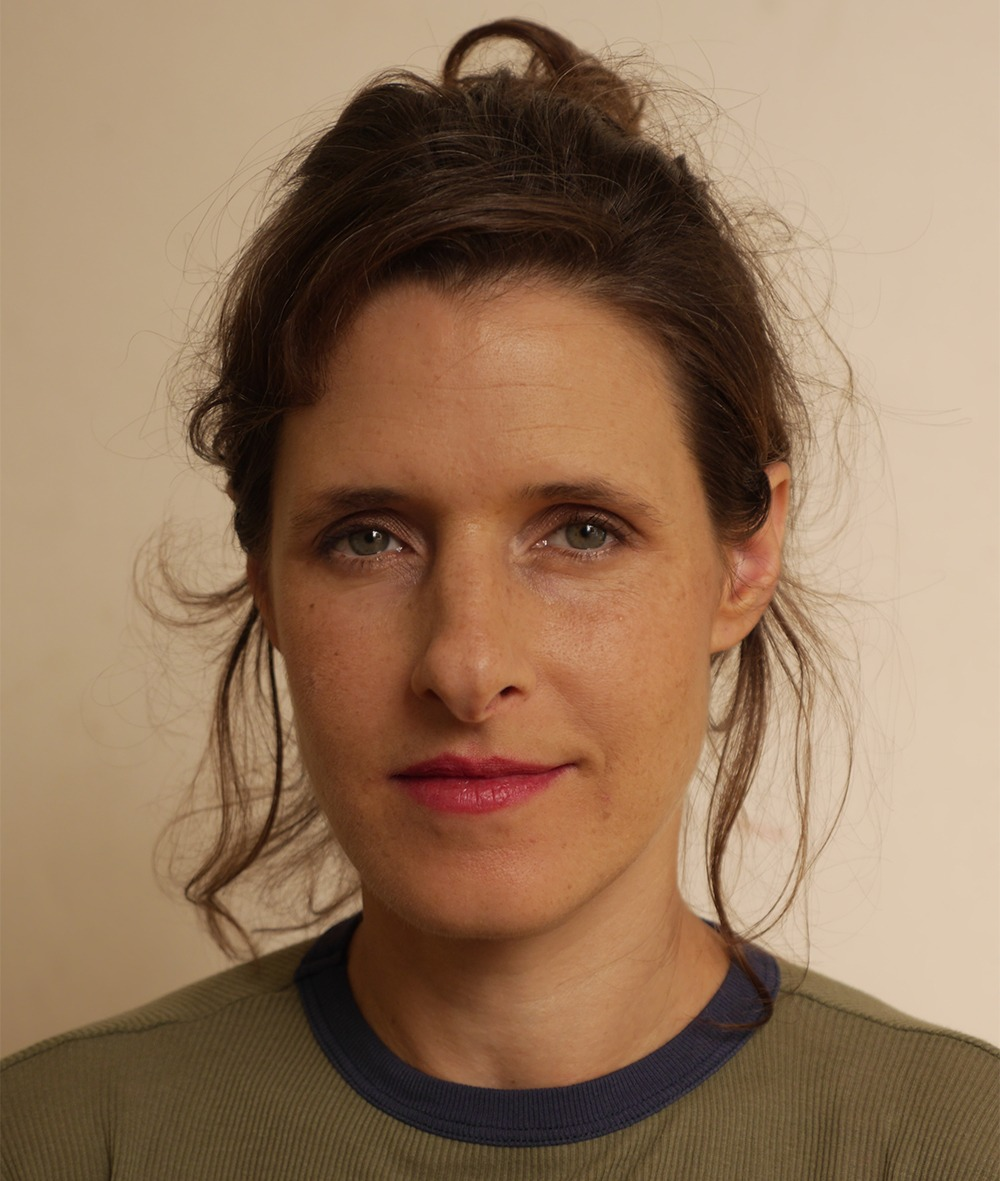
- Kenig in 2024
- Born: Tel Aviv, Israel
- Education: Sam Spiegel Film and Television School
- Occupations: Film director, writer, film editor and actress
- Notable work: Off-White Lies; On the Spectrum; The Milky Way
- Spouse: Gur Bentwich

Maya Kenig (Hebrew: מאיה קניג) is an Israeli film director, writer, film editor and actress. She is best known for her work on The Milky Way (2023), In the Shade of the Palm Tree (2018), The Bentwich Syndrome (2015), Off White Lies (2011) and Top of the World (2005). Her films were awarded in many festivals worldwide.

As an editor, she is known for On the Spectrum (TV series, 2018), Uri and Ella (TV series 2016), Up the Wrong Tree (Feature film 2012) and Connected (TV series 2009).

As an actress she is known for A Round Trip (2018), You're Next (2016), A Strange Course of Events (2014), Up the Wrong Tree (2013) and Petah Tikva(2007).

== Childhood ==
Born in 1979 in Tel Aviv, Maya Kenig spent her early childhood in Germany. She came back to Israel with her family at 6 years old and later on as a teenager, began developing in films.

== Career ==
=== Filmmaking ===
Kenig graduated with excellence the acclaimed art High school Alon and majored in literature and film. Her graduation film The Latchkey Kid (1997) won two prizes at the Jerusalem film Festival. In the army Maya served at a film unit, where she had the chance to practice filmmaking and specialized mainly on editing photographing and teaching.

In 2001 she studied filmmaking at The London Film School, where she made several shorts, One of them called Still water received a special mention note. After one year of studies there she went back to Israel and started studying at the Sam Spiegel film school in Jerusalem. Where she has made the film Top of the world screened in many festivals around the world, and My Mom a short documentary that was screened at the Docaviv FF and was broadcast on TV in Israel.

Off-White Lies (2011) is her first feature film, premiered at the Berlinale, and it was nominated for the Israeli academy awards in many categories, including for best film, script and directing. Gur Bentwich received the Best Actor award at the Jerusalem Film Festival 2011- for his role in the film.

== Prizes and festivals ==
Milk was at the Berlinale talent Market this year – 2018 and it won the VFF Talent Highlight Award.
