= Thirteen Steps Down (TV series) =

- Genre: Thriller
- Created by: Book by Ruth Rendell
- Written by: Adrian Hodges
- Directed by: Marek Losey
- Starring: Luke Treadaway; Geraldine James; Elarica Gallacher
- Composer: Frans Bak
- Country of origin: United Kingdom
- Original language: English
- No. of series: 1
- No. of episodes: 2

Production
- Executive producers: Alan Moloney; Mary Callery; Adrian Hodges
- Producer: Neil Zeiger
- Cinematography: Seamus Deasy
- Running time: 45-50 mins
- Production company: Parallel Films

Original release
- Network: ITV
- Release: 13 August – 20 August 2012

Thirteen Steps Down is a 2012 two part television thriller based on the 2004 novel by Ruth Rendell first broadcast by ITV.

== Plot ==
Mix Cellini is a lonely, maladjusted young man who works for a company that repairs exercise equipment, and lives in the upstairs apartment of an old Victorian house on Notting Hill. His reclusive elderly landlady, Gwendolen Chaucer, spends her time reading and pondering lost loves. Mix, on the other hand, is obsessed with the serial killer John Christie, who had once lived nearby, and also with a local model, Nerissa Nash.

Mix begins stalking Nerissa and learns that she visits a gym in the area. He goes to the gym and offers to repair their equipment at a lower rate than their usual engineer. Whilst there, he flirts with receptionist Danila and asks her out, but mainly because he sees her as a means to learn more about Nerissa.

On his second date with Danila, Mix takes her back to his flat. But the evening turns sour when Danila criticises his choice of 60s music, is revolted by a “cocktail” Mix has concocted, and makes derogatory remarks about Nerissa, after seeing framed photos of the model in the flat. After she breaks one of Mix’s pictures, he beats her to death with a heavy torch.

Mix wraps Danila’s corpse in plastic, and buries her beneath the floorboards of an empty room in the house. He continues to stalk Nerissa and sees her meet with a friend - a man called Darel to whom she’s attracted.

Meanwhile Miss Chaucer has noticed a smell of decay coming from the room where Danila is buried. Thinking it’s due to a woodworm infestation, she calls an exterminator. But she then falls ill and Mix turns the exterminator away while Miss Chaucer is in bed. A doctor attends the old lady, diagnoses pneumonia, and arranges for her to be taken to hospital. During her absence, Mix moves Danila’s body from under the floorboards and buries her in the garden.

Miss Chaucer arranges for her niece’s daughter to drive her home from hospital. But the daughter is Nerissa, who is appalled to find that her stalker, Mix, lives in the house. Mix tries to flirt with her, but she hurries away in disgust.

Miss Chaucer finds Danila’s thong on her bedroom floor, where Mix inadvertently dropped it as he was moving the body. She questions him and says she has also noticed he has been digging in the garden. When he cannot supply satisfactory answers, she gives him notice to quit, and says she will call the police the next morning. That night, Mix goes to her room and smothers her, not realising that she has died in her sleep. He puts her body under the floorboards and tells Miss Chaucer’s friends that the old lady has gone away to convalesce. However they are suspicious and call the police.

Mix’s mental state has deteriorated to the extent that he believes Nerissa is his girlfriend. He goes to her house and pushes his way in, but she calls Darel, who arrives and throws Mix out, humiliating him in the process. Afterwards, Darel and Nerissa have sex, but when he is about to leave, she realises he does not return her feelings for him.

At Miss Chaucer’s house, the police have found the bodies and evidence of Mix’s obsession with Nerissa. As one of Miss Chaucer’s friends had seen Mix leaving armed with a knife, the police rush straight to Nerissa’s address.

Meanwhile Mix has arrived back at Nerissa’s. She and Darel are standing in the drive and Mix slashes him on the arm before the police arrive and arrest him.

Darel asks Nerissa to help with his wound, but she walks away from him, saying it’s just a scratch. Back at Miss Chaucer’s house, her friends sadly reflect on what has happened.

== Production ==
Set in London's Notting Hill and the nearby home of John Christie at 10 Rillington Place filming took place over five weeks in London and Dublin.

== Cast and characters ==
Luke Treadaway, Anna Calder-Marshall, Gemma Jones, and Geraldine James

- Luke Treadaway as Mix Cellini
- Geraldine James as Gwendolen
- Elarica Gallacher as Nerissa Nash
- Gemma Jones as Olive
- Anna Calder-Marshall as Queenie
- Victoria Bewick as Danila
- Sam O'Mahony as Darel
- Maryam d'Abo as Madame Odette
- Laura Pyper as Kayleigh
- Ben Shafik as Abbas
- Brian Bovell as Tom
- Carrie Crowley as Hazel
- Melanie Gray as Colette
