= Daniella Kertesz =

Israeli actress (born 1989)

- דניאלה קרטס
- Born: March 11, 1989 (age 37); Ramat HaSharon, Israel
- Occupation: Actress
- Years active: 2003–present
- Known for: World War Z

Daniella Kertesz (Hebrew: דניאלה קרטס; born March 11, 1989) is an Israeli actress. She played Segen in the film World War Z, and starred as Onie in the psychological thriller film AfterDeath. She played a starring role as Racheli Warburg in Season 3 of the international Israeli hit show Shtisel.

== Early life ==
Kertesz was born in Ramat HaSharon, Israel, to a family of Jewish background. Her father Gabriel Kertesz is an architect and was born in Romania. Her mother Dorothy is an English teacher and was born in Belgium. Kertesz is the youngest child in her family.

Kertesz spent her childhood growing up in the Yemin Moshe neighbourhood in Jerusalem, Israel. She moved with her family to Tel Aviv when she was 15 years old.

Although her father served in an anti-aircraft unit in the Israel Defense Forces, and her brother is a helicopter pilot, Kertesz herself did not serve in the Israeli military due to her being a conscientious objector. She emigrated from Israel when she was 18, and resided in the United States.

== Career ==
Kertesz originally was an avid dancer, studying dance from age three and attending the Rubin Academy of Music and Dance. But her last summer living in Jerusalem, before she was to enter ninth grade, while visiting her brother in Tel Aviv she met a casting director in the stairwell of his building, and the casting director offered her an audition for a new television series. She was given the part, and her first appearance was in the Israeli television series Reds (Adumot), created by brothers Uri Barbash and Benny Barbash, at the age of 14. She was the main character Noa Sperling, a 15-year-old soccer player who creates a girls-only team after being asked to leave the boys' team. The show aired for two seasons.

She then had small roles in two series in 2007, Screenz and Custody (Mishmoret), created by Irit Linur, in which she played Tamar, the young daughter of a twice-divorced father. Kertesz then acted in the drama series "Masks" on the Yes satellite network.

Kertesz came to greater prominence playing in 13 episodes of the 2008 Israeli Channel 10 series The Naked Truth (Ha-Emet Ha’Eroma) as missing 17-year-old Hagar Ben David. That year she also played Avia, an innocent girl, in Israel Channel 10's Loving Anna ( "Le'ehov et anna").

Kertesz played "Segen" (meaning "first lieutenant" in Hebrew), a junior officer in the Israel Defense Forces (IDF) assigned to protect Brad Pitt's character's life, in the 2013 film World War Z. She auditioned for the part in Tel Aviv, and then in Malta with director Marc Forster and the producers.

She also played Onie in the psychological thriller AfterDeath, released in 2015, and was slated to appear in World War Z 2, but that project was ultimately cancelled in 2019.

In 2020, Kertesz joined the cast of Israeli hit show Shtisel, portraying an art dealer for her family trust who has a bipolar diagnosis.

== Personal life ==
As of 2018, she is in a relationship with Israeli photographer Yotam Menda Levi.

== Filmography ==
Year	Title	Role	Notes
2008–2009	Ha-Emet Ha'Eroma	Hagar Ben David	13 episodes
2013	World War Z	Segen	
2015	AfterDeath	Onie	
2018	Autonomies	Anna	6 episodes
2019	Incitement	Nava	
2020-2021	Shtisel	Racheli Warburg	Season 3; 9 episodes
