= IZZY – Stream Israel =

Streaming platform focused on Israeli content

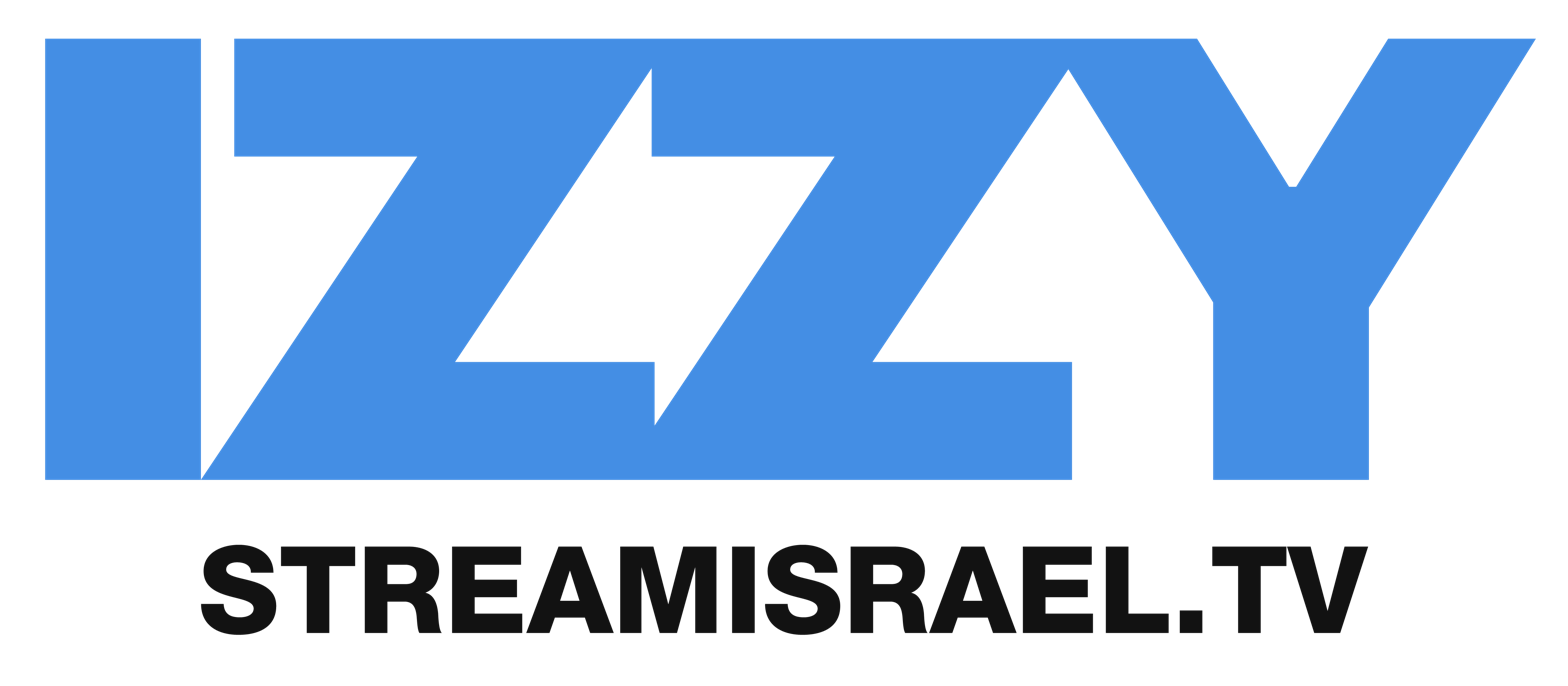
- Founded: 2020
- Headquarters: Tel-Aviv, Boston
- Area served: Worldwide (excluding Israel)
- Founder: Nati Dinnar
- Industry: Streaming media
- Website: izzy.streamisrael.tv

IZZY – Stream Israel is a global subscription-based streaming platform focused on Israeli content, including television series, films, and documentaries. The platform was launched in 2020 by American entrepreneur Josh Hoffman and Israeli television producer Nati Dinnar, with the goal of making Israeli stories accessible to a worldwide audience. It is sometimes referred to as the "Netflix of Israel." It has a content licensing model that includes revenue sharing with content owners. It offers subtitles in multiple languages, including French, Spanish, and Portuguese.
