= Neta Riskin =

Israeli actress and journalist

- נטע ריסקין
- Born: October 28, 1976 (age 49); Tel Aviv, Israel
- Occupation: Actress
- Years active: 2006–present

Neta Riskin (Hebrew: נטע ריסקין; born 28 October 1976) is an Israeli actress, political left-wing activist and journalist, best known for her role as Giti Weiss in the series Shtisel.

Riskin coached Israeli-born American actress Natalie Portman to speak Hebrew with an Israeli accent for A Tale of Love and Darkness.

Riskin was born in Tel Aviv, Israel, to secular Jewish architect parents. Her mother was born in Israel. Her father, a Holocaust survivor, was born in Lithuania. Her grandfather, Asher Gliberman, was an Israeli architect who immigrated from Belarus.

== Controversy ==
In June 2025, Riskin was involved in a public controversy following an exchange on social media with Arab-Israeli activist Yoseph Haddad. Responding to Haddad's post about infants rescued after Iranian missile attacks on Israel, Riskin wrote, "Do you know how many babies we have bombed? Do you think anyone will pity us now? Over a war we started? You are making a joke of us and of yourself." Haddad replied by referencing the events of October 7, 2023, writing: "A war we started? Where were you on October 7?"

Riskin has frequently used her social media accounts to express her opposition to the war and has promoted fundraising campaigns on her Facebook page in support of Palestinian war victims.

== Filmography ==
=== Films ===
- A Tale of Love and Darkness (2015) as Haya
- Norman (2016) as Hannah
- Damascus Cover (2017) as Yael
- Longing (2017) as Yael
- Shelter (2018) as Naomi
- Nandauri (2025) as Marina

=== Television ===
- The Gordin Cell (2012-2015) as Nati Ganot/Nathalia Gordin
- Shtisel (2013–2021) as Giti Weiss
- Der Tel-Aviv-Krimi (2016) as Ronit Levi
- False Flag (2018-2019) as Anat Kedmi
- Very Important Person (2019) as Elie Shine
- The Spy (2019) as Tova
- East Side (2023) as Esti
