= Off White Lies =

- Film poster
- Directed by: Maya Kenig
- Written by: Maya Kenig, Dana Dimant
- Produced by: Yoav Roeh, Orit Zamir
- Starring: Gur Bentvich; Elya Inbar; Tzahi Grad
- Cinematography: Itay Vinograd
- Edited by: Or Ben David
- Music by: Udi Berner
- Release date: 2011
- Running time: 86 minutes
- Country: Israel
- Language: Hebrew

Off White Lies (Hebrew: אורחים לרגע) is a 2011 Israeli drama film directed by Maya Kenig in her feature film debut. It premiered at the 62nd Berlin International Film Festival and received seven nominations for Israel's Ophir Awards, including Best Film, Best Director and Best Screenplay. Gur Bentwich won a Best Actor award at the Jerusalem Film Festival.

== Plot ==
After years of living in the U.S. with her mother, 13-year-old Libby (Elya Inbar) is sent to Israel to live with her estranged father, Shaul (Gur Bentwich), a hapless inventor who is currently “in-between apartments” (i.e. homeless). Libby's arrival coincides with the outbreak of the 2006 Lebanon War and, in order to provide a home for her, Shaul pretends that they are refugees from Northern Israel so that a wealthy Jerusalem family, who want to extend a helping hand to their fellow citizens, can take them in. Finally in a “normal” household, Shaul and Libby begin to build their father-daughter relationship, but their false identities can't last forever, especially as Libby unleashes teenage fury at the lies permeating her life, those she must tell now, and those she's been fed since childhood.

== Cast ==
- Elya Inbar as Libby
- Gur Bentwich as Shaul
- Tzahi Grad as Gideon
- Arad Yeini as Yuval
- Salit Achi-Miriam as Helit
