= Elarica Johnson =

English actress (born 1989)

- Born: 21 August 1989 (age 37); London, England, UK
- Other name: Elarica Gallacher
- Occupations: Actress and model
- Years active: 2008–present
- Notable work: P-Valley

Elarica Johnson (or Gallacher; born 21 August 1989) is a British actress and model. On television, she is known for her roles in the Starz drama P-Valley (2020–2026) and the Sky Atlantic fantasy series A Discovery of Witches (2018).

== Early life ==
Johnson was born in London. She attended the BRIT School and briefly considered becoming a singer.

== Career ==
She began her career with roles in the BBC soap opera EastEnders (2010) and the fantasy film Harry Potter and the Half-Blood Prince (2009). Johnson had one of the main roles on Starz's drama television series P-Valley (2020–2022) for two seasons. She portrayed Autumn Night, a hurricane survivor who finds an abandoned suitcase and a wallet with an ID that she starts using as her own. Autumn begins working at a strip club in Mississippi and has PTSD from a past abusive relationship. Johnson departed the show after the second season's series finale.

== Filmography ==
=== Film ===
Year	Title	Role	Notes
2009	Harry Potter and the Half-Blood Prince	Waitress	
2010	Chatroom	Ushi	
2012	My Brother the Devil	Vanessa	
2013	Powder Room	Jenny	
2014	The Forgotten	Carmen	
2014	The Place We Go to Hide	Celeste	Short film
2015	AfterDeath	Patricia	
2015	Occupy	Nisha	Short film
2017	How to Talk to Girls at Parties	Dark Stella	
2017	Blade Runner 2049	Doxie #3	
2019	Six Days of Sistine	Sistine	

=== Television ===
Year	Title	Role	Notes
2008	Fallout	Alyia	Television film
2010	EastEnders	Kylie	13 episodes
2011	Top Boy	Sophie	3 episodes
2012	Thirteen Steps Down	Nerissa Nash	2 episodes
2013	Jo	Jasmine	Season 1, episode 2: "Pigalle"
2015	The Delivery Man	Comfort Evans	Season 1, episode 4: "Celebrity"
2016	Death in Paradise	Sadie Mernier	Season 5, episode 3: "Posing in Murder"
2017	Strike	Lula Landry	3 episodes
2018	A Discovery of Witches	Juliette Durand	6 episodes
2018	Agatha Raisin	Lucy Trumpington-James	Episode: "The Fairies of Fryfam"
2020–2022	P-Valley	Hailey Colton / Autumn Night / Lakeisha Savage	Main role; 17 episodes
2023–2025	Castlevania: Nocturne	Drolta Tzuentes	Voice; 15 episodes
2026	Mobland	Gemma	
