= The Incredible Journey (film series) =

Disney film franchise

Homeward Bound
- Official franchise logo, as released in 1993.
- Based on: The Incredible Journey by Sheila Burnford
- Starring: Rex Allen; Michael J. Fox; Sally Field; Don Ameche; Ralph Waite; Various actors; (See additional details below)
- Distributed by: The Walt Disney Company
- Country: United States
- Language: English
- Box office: ~≤$78,742,747 (total of 3 films) (Note: This is an approximate figure, based on the publicly released information.)

The Incredible Journey film series (also referred to as the Homeward Bound series), consists of American adventure family-comedy films, based on the 1961 novel of the same name by Sheila Burnford. The plot centers around unlikely trios of pets, who must work together as teams to find their way back through hundreds of miles to their respective homes. Each film uses a combination of voice acting with animal actors to portray for triple leads and emote their thoughts and spirit, alongside the actors for their family of owners.

The franchise includes the 1963 critically esteemed original feature film adaptation of the novel, as well as the 1993 remake and its respective 1996 sequel. The remake was similarly a box office success and met with positive reception with critics, and its sequel was met with mixed reviews.

== Origin ==
The 1961 British adventure children's novel by Scottish author Sheila Burnford, served as the inspiration for The Walt Disney Company's Homeward Bound film series. The story follows three pets: a young Labrador Retriever named Luath, an old English Bull Terrier named Champion Boroughcastle Brigadier of Doune (nicknamed "Bodger" for short), and a loyal Siamese cat name Tao. Together the animals brave over 300 miles through the Northwestern Ontario Canadian wilderness, searching for their masters. The events along the way portray the stress and suffering they experience along the way, as well as the loyalty and love the animals have for their owners.

Burnford has stated that though the novel is associated with children's literature, she did not write it with this intention. The author was inspired to write the story, based on the three family pets that she and her husband had while living in Canada, which each had a remarkably close relationship with each other. Following The Walt Disney Company 1963 adaptation, the studio developed a film franchise, with a reboot and its sequel.

== Films ==
Film	U.S. release date	Director	Screenwriter(s)	Producer(s)
The Incredible Journey	November 20, 1963	Fletcher Markle	James Algar	Walt Disney and James Algar
Homeward Bound: The Incredible Journey	February 3, 1993	Duwayne Dunham	Caroline Thompson and Linda Woolverton	Jeffrey Chernov and Franklin R. Levy
Homeward Bound II: Lost in San Francisco	March 8, 1996	David R. Ellis	Chris Hauty and Julie Hickson	Barry Jossen

=== The Incredible Journey (1963) ===
Professor James Hunter is the proud owner of an aging English Bull Terrier named Bodger. His children Peter and Elizabeth are the owners of a young and rambunctious Labrador Retriever named Luath and a Siamese Cat named Tao, respectively. While the Hunter family is away, they take their pets across the country to their close friend named John Longridge. Under his care, the trio of pets begin to miss their owners. When John goes for a camping trip, leaving the animals in the care of his maid, the pets' loneliness overwhelms them. The three animals decide to find their way home, braving dangers and the 250 miles between. Along the way, the trio work together to overcome hunger, wild animals, and avoid the risks of natural wildlife. Despite the long journey, the trio work together to achieve their goal and return to their owners.

=== Homeward Bound: The Incredible Journey (1993) ===
A trio of animals – a young and adventurous American Bulldog named Chance, a wise and aged Golden Retriever named Shadow, and a reserved Chocolate Point Himalayan Cat named Sassy – are the beloved pets of the Seaver family. When the Seavers prepare to leave for a family vacation to San Francisco, California, they leave their three beloved pets at a family friend's ranch. As the animals grow restless, they begin to suspect that they have been abandoned and left for good. Together they decide to risk their lives, working together to brave the dangerous and exciting journey through the California wilderness to find their way home.

=== Homeward Bound II: Lost in San Francisco (1996) ===
When the Seaver family plans a family trip to Canada, they decide that this time they're bringing their three beloved pets with them. As they arrive at the San Francisco International Airport, and begin checking in their bags as well as their animals, the pets begin to panic thinking that they are being taken to the pound. As a group they break out of their carrier kennels, and rush out into the town. Together Chance, Shadow, and Sassy brave the big city which is home to various stray animals, all while avoiding the local dogcatchers. As they make new friends, the trio decides that they're not fit for vagrant lifestyle and work to once again find their owners and return home.

== Main cast and characters ==
List indicators

This section includes characters who will appear or have appeared in the franchise in main roles.

- An empty grey cell indicates the character was not in the film, or that the character's official presence has not yet been confirmed.
- ^{V} indicates a voice-only role.

Character	Film		
Character	The Incredible Journey	Homeward Bound: The Incredible Journey	Homeward Bound II: Lost in San Francisco
Principal cast
Bodger	Muffy Bull Terrier		
Luath	Rink Labrador Retriever		
Tao	Syn Cat Siamese cat		
The Narrator	Rex Allen^{V}		
Prof. James Hunter	John Drainie		
Nancy Hunter	Sandra Scott		
Peter Hunter	Ronald Cohoon		
Elizabeth Hunter	Marion Finlayson		
Chance		Michael J. Fox^{V} American Bulldog	Michael J. Fox^{V} American Bulldog
Shadow		Don Ameche^{V} Golden Retriever	Ralph Waite^{V} Golden Retriever
Sassy		Sally Field^{V} Himalayan cat	Sally Field^{V} Himalayan cat
Jaimie Burnford-Seaver		Kevin Chevalia	Kevin Chevalia
Peter Burnford-Seaver		Benj Thall	Benj Thall
Hope Burnford-Seaver		Veronica Lauren	Veronica Lauren
Laura Burnford-Seaver		Kim Greist	Kim Greist
Bob Seaver		Robert Hays	Robert Hays
Supporting cast
John Longrige	Émile Genest		
Mrs. Oakes	Beth Amos		
Bert Oakes	Eric Clavering		
Kate		Jean Smart	
Frank		Gary Taylor	
Delilah			Carla Gugino^{V} Kuvasz
Riley			Sinbad^{V} Labrador Retriever-Mix
Sledge			Tisha Campbell^{V} Shetland Collie-Mix
Stokey			Michael Bell^{V} Portuguese Podengo
Spike			Ross Malinger^{V} Jack Russell Terrier
Lucky Lasorda			Tommy Lasorda^{V} Havanese
Sparky Michaels			Al Michaels^{V} Rough Collie
Trixie Uecker			Bob Uecker^{V} German Shepherd
Pete			Adam Goldberg^{V} Bullmastiff
Ashcan			Jon Polito^{V} Boxer

== Additional crew and production details ==
Film	Crew/Detail					
Film	Composer	Cinematographer	Editor(s)	Production companies	Distributing company	Running time
The Incredible Journey	Oliver Wallace	Kenneth Peach	Norman R. Palmer	Walt Disney Productions, Cangary Productions	Buena Vista Distribution	1hr 20mins
Homeward Bound: The Incredible Journey	Bruce Broughton	Reed Smoot	Jonathan P. Shaw	Walt Disney Pictures, Touchwood Pacific Partners I	Buena Vista Pictures	1hr 24mins
Homeward Bound II: Lost in San Francisco	Bruce Broughton	Jack Conroy	Peter E. Berger & Michael A. Stevenson	Walt Disney Pictures, City Dog Productions	Buena Vista Pictures	1hr 29mins

== Reception ==
=== Box office and financial performance ===
Film	North American Box office gross	Box office ranking		Home video sales gross	Total gross income	Budget	Worldwide total net income	Ref.
Film	North American Box office gross	All-time North America	All-time worldwide	North America	Total gross income	Budget	Worldwide total net income	Ref.
The Incredible Journey	Figures not publicly available	—N/a	—N/a	$4,200,000	>$4,200,000	Figures not publicly available	~≤$4,200,000	
Homeward Bound: The Incredible Journey	$41,833,324	#2,107	#3,230	Figures not publicly available	>$41,833,324	Figures not publicly available	~≤$41,833,324	
Homeward Bound II: Lost in San Francisco	$32,709,423	#2,639	#3,817	Figures not publicly available	>$32,709,423	Figures not publicly available	~≤$32,709,423	
Totals	>$74,542,747	x̄ #1,582	x̄ #2,349	>$4,200,000	>$78,742,747	Figures not publicly available	~≤$78,742,747	

=== Critical and public response ===
Film	Rotten Tomatoes	Metacritic	CinemaScore
The Incredible Journey	89% (9 reviews)	87/100 (5 reviews)	—N/a
Homeward Bound: The Incredible Journey	87% (30 reviews)	—N/a	A+
Homeward Bound II: Lost in San Francisco	53% (17 reviews)	—N/a	B+
