= The Incredible Journey (disambiguation) =

The Incredible Journey is a 1961 children's book by Scottish author Sheila Burnford.

The Incredible Journey may also refer to:

== Film ==
- The Incredible Journey (film series)
  - The Incredible Journey (film), a 1963 film based on the book
  - Homeward Bound: The Incredible Journey, a 1993 remake of the 1963 film

== Literature ==
- The Incredible Journey, a 1923 novel by Catherine Edith Macauley Martin
- Incredible Journeys, a 1997 non-fiction book by Nigel Marven

== Television ==
- "Bad Dog's Incredible Journey", Bad Dog season 2, episode 2a (20000)
- "Incredible Journey", The Cat in the Hat Knows a Lot About That! season 1, episode 20a (2011)
- "Incredible Journeys", Finding Your Roots season 8, episode 7 (2022)
- "The Incredible Journey", Betty's Bunch episode 9 (1990)
- "The Incredible Journey", Skooled season 1, episode 2 (2006)
- "The Incredible Journey", South Beach Tow season 3, episode 7 (2013)
- "The Incredible Journey", The 5 Mrs. Buchanans episode 12 (1994)
- "The Incredible Journey", The New World of the Gnomes episode 12 (1997)

== See also ==
- Incredible Adventures, a 1914 short story collection by Algernon Blackwood
- The Incredible Voyage, a 1977 non-fiction narrative by Tristan Jones
- The Incredible Journey of Doctor Meg Laurel, a 1979 American made-for-television medical drama film
- The Incredible Journey of Mary Bryant, a 2005 television miniseries
- The Incredible Human Journey, a 2009 non-fiction work by Alice Roberts
- Amazing Journey (disambiguation)
- Fantastic Journey (disambiguation)
- The Journey (disambiguation)
