= Luath =

Luath is a name for a male dog which is a recurring motif in Scottish literature. The Scottish Gaelic word luath (Scottish Gaelic pronunciation: [ˈl̪ˠuə]) means "swift", "fleet-footed" or "feisty".

In Ossian's Fingal by James Macpherson, published in 1761, Luath is the name of Cuthullin's hunting dog. "Tell Swaran, tell that heart of pride, Cuthullin never yields! I give him the dark-rolling sea; I give his people graves in Erin. But never shall a stranger have the pleasing sunbeam of my love. No deer shall fly on Lochlin's hills, before swift-footed Luäth."

Robert Burns had a favourite Border Collie named Luath that was killed maliciously the night before Burns's father's death in 1786. It is said that Jean Armour tripped over Luath at a wedding, thus giving Burns the chance to speak to the woman who would later become his wife. Burns immortalized the collie in his poem "The Twa Dogs", published in the Kilmarnock Edition, a political satire in which a ploughman's collie named Luath, "a rhyming ranting, raving billie," teaches Caesar, the dog of a member of the gentry, that honest humble poverty can have more worth than sophistication of manners.

William Gordon Stables' novel Sable And White: The Autobiography of a Show Dog, published in 1894, features a talking collie named Luath.

J. M. Barrie had a black-and-white Newfoundland named Luath which was the inspiration for Nana, the Darling children's canine nurse in the 1904 play and novel Peter Pan. The pattern on Luath's coat was copied precisely for Nana's costume in the stage play. Barrie wrote: "I must have sat at table with that great dog waiting for me to stop, not complaining, for he knew it was thus we made our living, but giving me a look when he found he was to be in the play, with his sex changed."

In Sheila Burnford's 1961 children's book The Incredible Journey, and also in the 1963 Disney film, Luath is a young Labrador Retriever with golden red fur.

The Luath Press was established in 1981 as a publisher of Scottish literature.

== Sources ==
- Bauer, Michael; Robertson, William (2009). "Faclair Beag". Faclair Beag Gaelic Dictionary.
- Birkin, Andrew (2003). J.M.Barrie and the Lost Boys: The Real Story Behind Peter Pan. Yale University Press. ISBN 0300098227.
- Blair, Hugh, ed. (2009). "The Poetical Works of James MacPherson" (PDF).
- Cairney, John (2013). The Luath Burns Companion. Luath Press.
- Cosslett, Tess (2006). Talking Animals in British Children's Fiction 1786–1914. Ashgate Publishing.
- Lukens, Rebecca (2006). A Critical Handbook of Children's Literature. Pearson Allyn and Bacon.
- Muir, Margaret (2009). "Nana and Luath - the fact and fiction of a pair of Newfoundland dogs".
- Orr, Jennifer (2014). "The Twa Dogs". BBC Website.
