= HaMidrasha =

HaMidrasha means "Seminary" or "Academy" in Hebrew. It may refer to two specific academies:

== Academies ==
- HaMidrasha – Faculty of the Arts, an art academy in Israel
- HaMidrasha - the academy of the Mossad Israeli intelligence and operations agency

== Television series ==
It may also refer to a Television series:

- Mossad 101 - an Israeli TV series dealing with the Mossad's academy, whose original name is "HaMidrasha"
