= Southern White =

Southern White may refer to:

- White Southerners
- Southern American English
- American Bulldog
- Southern white rhinoceros
