= The Girl from Oslo (TV series) =

Israeli television series

- Genre: Drama, thriller
- Written by: Kyrre Holm Johannessen; Ronit Weiss-Berkowitz
- Directed by: Uri Barbash, Stian Kristiansen
- Starring: Anneke von der Lippe; Amos Tamam; Raida Adon; Aviv Pinkas
- Countries of origin: Norway; Israel
- Original languages: Hebrew; Arabic; Norwegian; English
- No. of seasons: 1
- No. of episodes: 10

Production
- Production locations: Norway, Israel
- Production companies: TV2, HOT

Original release
- Network: TV2, Netflix, HOT
- Release: 8 April 2021

The Girl from Oslo (Hebrew: אזהרת מסע; Norwegian: Bortført, from Norwegian: "Kidnapped") is a 2021 Israeli-Norwegian thriller drama television series starring Anneke von der Lippe, Amos Tamam, and Raida Adon, written by Ronit Weiss Berkowitz together with Norwegian screenwriter Kyrre Holm Johannessen, produced by Netflix, and aired on April 11, 2021, on HOT and Norwegian TV 2. It is co-directed by Uri Barbash and Stian Kristiansen It was filmed mostly in Israel and partly in Norway, and is spoken in four languages (Hebrew, English, Norwegian and Arabic).

Production of the series began in 2019, and in May 2020, pre-production began for filming, but when the coronavirus pandemic broke out in Israel, it was put on hold. Alon Abutbul was initially cast as Arik, but he was replaced by Amos Tamam.

Upon its premiere on HOT in April 2021, the series received lukewarm reviews in Israel, with critics claiming that the plot was predictable and clichéd. However, when it aired on Netflix, it ranked fourth as the most-watched series in the world in the last week of 2021.

In 2024, it was announced that Lior Ashkenazi and Aviv Pinkas had been cast in the second season of the series. Filming for the second season is taking place in Athens.

== Synopsis ==
Nadav (Daniel Litman), a musician who had served in a combat unit of the IDF, grew up in an ultra-Orthodox family, with his father being a rabbi. After he, his mother, and his younger sister (Shira Yosef) came out as secular, the father cut off all contact with them. At one of his performances, he meets Pia (Andrea Berntzsen), a young 24-year-old Norwegian tourist and medical student, who takes a liking to him. He invites her to join him and his sister on vacation in Sinai.

While on vacation in Sinai, the three are kidnapped by ISIS. In exchange for their lives, the terrorist organization demands the release of terrorists imprisoned in Israel and Norway. If the prisoners are not released, the hostages will be executed. The governments of Israel and Norway oppose a deal with ISIS.

26 years earlier, in 1993, behind the scenes of the talks that led to the Oslo Accords, three people from different worlds met outside the negotiating rooms: Arik (Amos Tamam), a junior official in the Foreign Ministry who accompanied the Israeli delegation; Norwegian Alex Bakke (Anneke von der Lippe), an employee of the FAFO Foundation that conducted the talks; and Palestinian Layla (Raida Adon), who came as an interpreter with the Palestinian representatives. They spent most of their time waiting outside the conference room, and the initial hostility between the three turned into friendship, and even a charged love story was born between Alex and Arik. By the time the agreement was signed, each had returned to his own life and they had separated. Arik was not even aware that Alex was pregnant with his child, Pia. Alex quickly married Carl (Anders Andersen) and hoped that her secret would not be revealed.

In the meantime, the mother of the Israeli hostages sets up a protest tent in Jerusalem and tries to exert public pressure for their release.

Although Karl was surprised by his daughter's visit to Israel, his mother understood the reason for it - Pia was flying out of a desire to meet her biological father.

Driven mad with worry, Alex arrives in Israel and tells Arik, now the Israeli Minister of Intelligence, that the kidnapped Norwegian girl is actually his daughter. Now Arik will have to risk everything to save the daughter he never knew existed. Far away, in Norway, Karl is trying to free the terrorist arrested in Norway in order to exchange him for the kidnapped girl, whom he has raised as his own.

Alex, who realizes that the two men, Arik and Karl, are unable to save her daughter, discovers that one of the kidnappers is Layla's son.

Years after the Oslo talks, the Arik/Alex/Layla trio meets again, this time to plan a complex operation to bring their children home.

== Release ==
The Girl from Oslo was released on Netflix on 8 April 2021.

== Cast ==
- Anneke von der Lippe as Alex, Pia's mother
- Amos Tamam as Arik, a member of the Israeli government with a personal history with Alex
- Raida Adon as Layla, another old friend of Alex with connections to the Hamas
- Andrea Berntzen as Pia, Alex's daughter who's abducted by ISIS
- Daniel Litman as Nadav, an Israeli man abducted along with Pia and his little sister Noa
- Aviv Pinkas as Adva
- Shira Yosef as Noa, an Israeli girl abducted along with Pia and her big brother Nadav
- Anders T. Anderseen as Karl, Alex's husband, a lawyer
- Vered Feldman as Anat, mother of Nadav and Noa
- Shadi Mar'i as Yusuf, Layla's son and one of Pia's abductors
- Rotem Abuhav as Dana, Arik's wife
- Jameel Khoury as Bashir, member of the Hamas
- Abhin Galeya as Abu Salim, a terrorist being held prisoner in Norway
- Hisham Sulliman as Ali
- Reut Portugal as Bat-El

== List of Episodes ==
Season 1

1. Hemmeligheten (The secret) 11-04-2021
2. Flukten (The escape) 11-04-2021
3. Redningsaksjonen (The rescue mission) 18-04-2021
4. Etterdønningene (The aftermath) 25-04-2021
5. Etterforskningen (The investigation) 02-05-2021
6. Trusselen (The threat) 09-05-2021
7. Stormen (The storm) 16-05-2021
8. Fellen (The trap) 23-05-2021
9. Forhandlingen (The negotiations) 30-05-2021
10. Utvekslingen (The exchange) 06-06-2021
