= Wait for Me (2022 film) =

- עד שתחזור
- Directed by: Sari Azoulay Turgeman
- Starring: Hallel Yannay Shani; Daniel Litman
- Cinematography: Edan Sasson
- Edited by: Shira Hochman
- Music by: Sapir Matityahu
- Distributed by: United King Films
- Release dates: 14 October 2022 (Warsaw Film Festival); 24 April 2025 (Israel)
- Running time: 95 minutes
- Country: Israel
- Languages: Hebrew; Greek; English

Wait for Me (Hebrew: עד שתחזור) is an Israeli drama film written and directed by Sari Azoulay Turgeman. The film stars Hallel Yannay Shani and Daniel Litman. It premiered in 2022 and was released theatrically in Israel on 24 April 2025.

Maya (Yannay Shani), a skilled young sailor trained by her father, sets off alone on a secretive mission to reach a cargo ship where he works—without her mother's knowledge. When she arrives in Cyprus to find the ship has already departed, she must rely on the help of a reluctant local sailor (Litman) to continue her journey. As hidden motives come to light, her voyage becomes a suspenseful and emotional quest for truth and connection.

== Plot summary ==
Taught to sail by her father, David (Morris Cohen), Maya (Hallel Yannay Shani) is a skilled and self-assured navigator who knows exactly how to reach her destination. Her goal is to rendezvous with a cargo ship where her father is working, though her mother (Adi Gilat) believes she's simply staying with a friend. The reason behind Maya's determination remains a mystery at first, gradually unveiled as the story unfolds. When she reaches Cyprus only to discover the ship has already left port, she finds herself at a crossroads. To make matters worse, her boat's engine refuses to start, and she's met with skepticism and mockery from local sailors when she asks for help. They doubt her ability to pay for repairs and insist on speaking with her father, who she falsely claims is with her.

Meanwhile, a parallel storyline follows her mother and her brother, Assaf (Ofek Pesach), a soldier who abandoned a promising soccer career for military service. Struggling to manage his emotions, Assaf ends up in a serious altercation.

When Maya's mother realizes that her daughter isn't where she claimed to be, and has instead ventured out to sea alone—she desperately urges the authorities to begin a search. As the truth behind Maya's mission is gradually revealed, her journey gains emotional weight, tension builds.

Eventually, she finds help in Nikos (Daniel Litman), a principled and attractive young sailor from Cyprus. He agrees to fix the engine and accompany her to Crete—her intended destination, and a place he also needs to reach due to a strike disrupting transport at the docks.

== Cast ==
- Hallel Yannay Shani as Maya Elkayam, a 16-year-old that sails away in search of her father
- Daniel Litman as Nikos Constantinos, a 34-year-old Greek Cypriot skipper
- Adi Gilat as Orly Elkayam, as Maya's mother
- Ofek Pesach as Assaf Elkayam
- Morris Cohen as David Elkayam, Maya's father

== Production ==
The project was filmed with an Israeli crew during the COVID-19 pandemic. Azoulay Turgeman had previously intended for Litman's role to be played by a local Greek actor. However, due to the pandemic, she began to search for an Israeli actor who could speak English with a Greek accent. Yannay Shani did not have acting experience but was hired based on an audition and her experience as a real-life skipper.

== Release ==
The film was released theatrically in Israel on 23 April 2025.

=== Festivals ===
The film had its international premiere at the Warsaw Film Festival on 14 October 2022. Azoulay Turgeman and the main cast, including Litman and Yannay Shani attended the premiere and participated in a Q&A.

In 2023, it was part of the official selection of the Vittorio Veneto Film Festival in Italy.

In 2024, it premiered at the Judy Levis Krug Boca Raton Jewish Film Festival in Florida.

== Reception ==
The film was praised by Hannah Brown, film critic for The Jerusalem Post, describing it as a "a well-made, atmospheric drama." Brown also praised the cast, describing Yannay Shani as "convincing" and writing that Litman "has real movie star looks and presence, and brings energy and charisma to his role as the good-hearted sailor who helps Maya."

=== Awards and nominations ===
The film was nominated for Best Film at the Warsaw Film Festival in 2022.

In December it won the award for Best International Feature at the Coliseum International Film Festival, held in Rome in December 2023.
