= The Fools in Town Are on Our Side =

1970 novel by Ross Thomas

- First American edition cover
- Author: Ross Thomas
- Language: English
- Genre: Crime, espionage, satire
- Set in: Texas
- Publisher: Hodder & Stoughton (UK); William Morrow (US)
- Publication date: 1970
- Publication place: United Kingdom (1970); United States (1971)
- Media type: Print
- Pages: 383
- ISBN: 9780340127377
- OCLC: 131353

The Fools in Town Are on Our Side is a 1970 crime/espionage/social satire novel by American author Ross Thomas.

== The title ==
The title is a slightly altered quote from Mark Twain's The Adventures of Huckleberry Finn:

"Hain’t we got all the fools in town on our side? And ain’t that a big enough majority in any town?"

== Plot ==
The novel is set around the time of its publication, and follows Lucifer Clarence Dye, who has been freshly exposed as a US intelligence agent following a bungled operation in Singapore (where a Chinese operative Dye had been trying to recruit instead died of a freak heart attack during a routine polygraph test.) Having just been released from a three-month term in a Singaporean jail in exchange for an official US apology (and a large bribe), Dye is cashiered from the small, independent intelligence agency Section 2 only to be immediately offered a job by an eccentric young man, Victor Orcutt. A self-proclaimed genius, Orcutt has decided to address the then-topical challenge of urban decay; however, his immodestly named "Orcutt's First Law" states that "Before things get better, they must get much worse." Dye's assignment is, therefore, to "corrupt me a city."

The city in question is Swankerton, a fictional settlement on the Texas Gulf Coast, where Victor Orcutt Associates has been hired to facilitate the election of a "Reform" slate to city offices. Swankerton hardly needs corrupting, being a cesspool of vice and depravity; the current leadership is knee-deep in drugs, gambling, and prostitution (with the backing by a major New Orleans mob boss, Giuseppe "Joe Lucky" Lucarelli), and the "Reform" candidates are if anything worse. Nevertheless, Dye and Orcutt's other operative, semi-disgraced ex-police chief Homer Necessary, begin disrupting the current municipal leaderships' operations.

Alternating chapters contain flashbacks to Dye's past: his childhood as the ward of Tante Katerine, White Russian madam of Shanghai's fanciest brothel, his adoption by American war correspondent Gorman Smalldane, their internment by the Japanese, his marriage to the daughter of the head of Section 2 and his subsequent recruitment, and the violent rape and murder of his wife during an attempt by an enemy organization to coerce information out of his father-in-law.

The rest of the main story deals with Dye's budding romance with Orcutt's assistant, the ex-prostitute Carol Thackerty, his meteoric ascent through the rotten power structure of Swankerton, and his conflict with Ramsey Lynch (née Montgomery Vicker,) the New Orleans mob's representative in Swankerton and the brother of Gerald Vicker, whom Dye had caused to be dismissed from Section 2 on suspicion of spying for China while Vicker was his subordinate at its Hong Kong station. After his efforts begin to draw attention, Dye is ordered out of the limelight by his former employers, a request he places himself in additional danger by refusing.

== Tone ==
The book is written in first-person POV. Dye's narrative is clipped, matter-of-fact, and unembellished, though wickedly incisive on personal and social matters. While he is capable of acting decisively and forcefully, Dye's overall manner is apathetic and unmotivated, except (slightly) by money. Additionally, he has several odd behavioral quirks, including an aversion to firearms, which apparently stem from the death of his wife. While he does not speak of it, the trauma of her loss seems to have left him in a prolonged state of something resembling shell-shock – his foster-father Gorman Smalldane at one point observes that Dye has spent the last fifteen years acting like a zombie.
