= Air War (film) =

- Directed by: Roy Hornshtein
- Written by: Roy Hornshtein; Yoav Katz
- Produced by: Moshe Edery; Michael Sharfstein
- Starring: Maor Schwitzer; Daniel Litman
- Cinematography: Benji Cohen
- Edited by: Yosef Grunfeld; Roy Hornshtein
- Distributed by: United King Films
- Release dates: 24 December 2023 (Shomron Film Festival); 11 April 2024; (theatrical)
- Running time: 104 minutes
- Country: Israel
- Language: Hebrew
- Budget: 6 million NIS

Air War (Hebrew: קרב אוויר) is a 2023 Israeli action drama film directed by Roy Hornshtein. The film stars Maor Schwitzer and Daniel Litman as Israeli Air Force pilots at the beginning of the Six Day War. It follows the two men and their operation that defeated the combined air forces of Egypt, Syria and Jordan in one day.

== Plot summary ==
A personal rivalry between two fighter pilots, Ran (Schwitzer) and Eitan (Litman) reaches its crescendo on the eve of the Six Day War. In an operational activity, Eitan's respected commander is killed. Ran steps into the role, supported by Eitan as deputy commander. Eitan feels threatened by the sudden appearance of Ran, whom he finds inexperienced. Their power struggle impacts upon the squadron as it becomes dysfunctional.

When the two crash land together in enemy territory, they are forced to learn to cooperate in order to survive. Upon their return to the squadron and the outbreak of the Six Day War, the two face a decisive battle and understand that only through cooperation will they be able to lead the squadron to victory. Eitan learns from his rival Ran how to overcome his fears and succeed.

== Cast ==
- Maor Schwitzer as Captain Ran Nesher
- Daniel Litman as Lieutenant Eitan Rom
- Lihi Kornowski
- Gily Itskovitch
- Amir Shurush
- Gal Amitai
- Yonatan Uziel
- Galy Reshef

== Production ==
Roy Hornshtein, the director, began working in the film in 2007. After securing investors and writing a script, he applied to the Israel Cinema Fund and the Rabinovitch Fund for support of approximately 3 million shekels. The request was denied, for failing to give more emphasis on "anti-war" sentiments and for "avoiding to touch on issues such as the horror of death and the destruction that war causes to both sides." According to Hornstein, these reasons were political and not professional. Hornshtein turned to Culture Minister Miri Regev and asked for an investigation on the subject, and it convened the subcommittee of the Film Council to examine his claims. In the end, Hornshtein received funding from the Yehoshua Rabinowitz Foundation for the Arts and the Shomron Cinema Fund, which was established as part of a reform passed by Regev.

Filming took place at the Israeli Air Force Museum at the Hatzerim Airbase, Kibbutz Yakum and an industrial zone in Ariel.

== Release ==
The film had its first screening on 24 December 2023 at the fourth annual Shomron Film Festival.

On 5 June 2024, it was part of the lineup for Israeli Cinema Day, held in Israel and supported by the Ministry of Culture and Sport.

The film was released theatrically in Israel on 11 April 2024.

== Reception ==
Mako gave the film three out of five stars, praising the period reconstruction and concluding: "In conclusion and a movie, "Krav Avir" deserves to be watched on a big screen. It is clearly made for the audience, and for the most part warrants our attention."
