= Kiss Me Kosher =

Kiss Me Kosher Kiss Me Before It Blows up
- Movie poster
- Directed by: Shirel Peleg
- Written by: Shirel Peleg
- Produced by: Christine Günther
- Starring: Moran Rosenblatt; Luise Wolfram; Rivka Michaeli; Aviv Pinkas
- Distributed by: X Verleih AG (through Warner Bros.) (Germany)
- Release date: September 10, 2020
- Running time: 106 minutes
- Countries: Germany; Israel
- Languages: Hebrew, Arabic, German and English

Kiss Me Kosher (alternate title: Kiss Me Before It Blows Up) is a 2020 German–Israeli film directed and scripted by Venezuelan-born, Israel-raised and German-based Shirel Peleg. The story is based on the true-life love story of Peleg and her partner and is Peleg's debut feature-length film as a director.

The film is about an Israeli woman named Shira (played by Moran Rosenblatt), and a German woman named Maria (played by Luise Wolfram), who through an initial misunderstanding become engaged to be married in Jerusalem. Shira's grandmother, Berta (played by Rivka Michaeli) tries to prevent this. Kiss Me Kosher started in German cinemas on September 10, 2020, and has since been playing in several international film festivals.

== Plot ==
While on vacation in Israel, Maria, a German biologist, meets the bar owner Shira and falls head over heels in love with her. Shortly after the end of the vacation, Maria has decided to stay in Israel and move in with Shira, when a misunderstanding happens and Shira believes she is being given a wedding proposal. Various complications arise, not only about the initial mistaken engagement but also the fact that some members of Shira's family (especially her grandmother Berta) are opposed to her marrying a German.

After hearing about the engagement, Maria's parents soon appear in Israel, and two different family worlds collide in Jerusalem.

== Background and production ==
Kiss Me Kosher was created by Fireglory Pictures in coproduction with SWR, Arte, Erfttal Film, and Big Top Studios. Most of the shooting took place in Tel Aviv, with shooting on individual days in Jerusalem on 27 days between mid-June and mid-July 2019. The film, which bears the alternative title Kiss Me Before It Blows Up, is Peleg's debut feature film.

The production was funded by the German Federal Government's Commissioner for Culture and the Media with 100,000 euros, by the German Film Funding Fund with just under 100,000 euros, and by Medienboard Berlin-Brandenburg with 50,000 euros. The creation of the script was funded by MFG Filmförderung.

The cinema release in Germany and Austria was on September 10, 2020, while the film was released in Switzerland on December 4, 2020. Worldwide sales are carried out by Totem Films based in Paris, and in Germany by X Verleih through Warner Bros. Pictures.

== Reception ==
Eric Langberg of Queerist says the film is a "sprawling family comedy that mostly doesn’t want to resolve any of these tensions, preferring instead to let its characters raise an issue and let it hang in the air awkwardly before laughing it off and moving on. It’s also structurally uneven, paced oddly, and more on-the-nose than it is subversive."

Trent Kinnucan of Hollywood Insider said the "film is international relations, writ small"

Knut Elstermann from MDR Kultur writes: In her debut, Peleg lets prejudices, clichés, insecurities and misunderstandings between Germans and Israelis collide and never forgets that the Shoah is the terrible reason for the deep mistrust.

Martin Schwickert describes Kiss Me Kosher in the Tagesspiegel as a screwball comedy and continues: Peleg stages dialogues that jump from one faux pas to the next. The superficial hectic pace contrasts with the relaxation with which family and political problems are told. Ultimately, it's not about provocation, but about tensing up the laughing cycles. In the ensemble he particularly highlights Riva Michaeli and Moran Rosenblatt.

Carsten Beyer from RBB Kultur writes: “[Peleg's] good knowledge of both cultures can be felt in her loving character drawing. The promised land that she shows is definitely not an ideal world - and laughing at successful situation comedy gets stuck in your throat more than once. If you add the technical details - the expressive pictures, the quick cuts and the original soundtrack - "Kiss me Kosher" is an absolutely successful debut. "

At no point does Peleg drift into incitement, she refrains from any dramatization or even attribution of blame. She is more concerned with everyday life in terms of personal abnormality. The scenes at the border control are just as natural as the interaction between Arab and Jewish residents of Jerusalem. Peleg does not embarrass anyone, but uses the old ideas of guilt and fate to turn their indissolubility into a comedy. She knows her way around the folds of history and can therefore ignore them, writes Ulrich Sonnenschein in Migazin.
