= Ross Thomas (author) =

American writer (1926–1995)

- Born: February 19, 1926; Oklahoma City, Oklahoma, U.S.
- Died: December 18, 1995 (aged 69); Santa Monica, California, U.S.
- Occupation: Writer
- Writing career
- Pen name: Oliver Bleeck
- Genre: Crime fiction
- Notable awards: Edgar Allan Poe Award for Best First Novel (1967); Edgar Allan Poe Award for Best Novel (1985); Gumshoe Award (2002)

Ross Thomas (February 19, 1926, in Oklahoma City – December 18, 1995, in Santa Monica, California) was an American writer of crime fiction. He is best known for his witty thrillers that expose the mechanisms of professional politics. He also wrote five novels under the pseudonym Oliver Bleeck about professional go-between Philip St. Ives.

== Early life ==
Thomas served with the infantry in the Philippines during World War II. He worked as a public relations specialist, correspondent with the Armed Forces Network, union spokesman, and political strategist in the US, Bonn (Germany), and Nigeria before becoming a writer.

== Career ==
Thomas's debut novel, The Cold War Swap, introducing McCorkle and Padillo, was written in only six weeks and won a 1967 Edgar Award for Best First Novel. Briarpatch earned the 1985 Edgar for Best Novel. In 2002 he was honored with the inaugural Gumshoe Lifetime Achievement Award, one of only two authors to earn the award posthumously (the other was 87th Precinct author Ed McBain in 2006).

In addition to his novels, Thomas also wrote an original screenplay for the 1995 movie Bad Company, about a CIA affiliated private spy organization. It was produced by Disney's Touchstone Pictures, scored by Joel and Ethan Coen's regular composer Carter Burwell and starred Ellen Barkin and Laurence Fishburne.

Thomas wrote an unproduced film for producer Robert Evans entitled Jimmy the Rumour. The project is the story of a man born without an identity who works as a thief stealing from other thieves.

The first three novels in the McCorkle-Padillo series are written in the first person, as are a number of others through Yellow Dog Contract. The fourth and final McCorkle-Padillo novel has an omniscient narrator, as do all of the other novels published after 1976. All five of the Philip St. Ives stories, however, are told in the first person.

== Death ==
Thomas died of lung cancer in Santa Monica, California, at age 69.

== Novels ==
- The Cold War Swap (1966)
- The Seersucker Whipsaw (1967)
- Cast a Yellow Shadow (1967)
- Singapore Wink (1969)
- The Fools in Town Are on Our Side (1970)
- The Backup Men (1971)
- The Porkchoppers (1972)
- If You Can't Be Good (1973)
- The Money Harvest (1975)
- Yellow-Dog Contract (1976)
- Chinaman's Chance (1978)
- The Eighth Dwarf (1979)
- The Mordida Man (1981)
- Missionary Stew (1983)
- Briarpatch (1984)
- Out on the Rim (1987)
- The Fourth Durango (1989)
- Twilight at Mac's Place (1990)
- Voodoo, Ltd (1992)
- Ah, Treachery! (1994)

=== As Oliver Bleeck ===
- The Brass Go-Between (1969)
- Protocol for a Kidnapping (1971)
- The Procane Chronicle (1971) – re-released as St. Ives after being adapted as the 1976 movie starring Charles Bronson.
- The Highbinders (1973)
- No Questions Asked (1976)

== Non-fiction ==
- Warriors for the Poor: The Story of VISTA, Volunteers In Service to America (with William H. Crook, 1969)
- Spies, Thumbsuckers, Etc. (1989)

== Recurring characters ==
The following characters appear in more than one novel:

- Cyril "Mac" McCorkle, former Army special-operations officer in World War II Burma and now co-owner of Mac's Place, a bar/restaurant first in Bonn and then in Washington, DC, and his polyglot business partner/friend Michael Padillo, spy/executioner for an unnamed government agency; both are in The Cold War Swap, Cast a Yellow Shadow, The Backup Men, and Twilight at Mac's Place. Padillo appears briefly in The Seersucker Whipsaw, tending bar as "Mike."
  - Fredl Arndt, McCorkle's wife.
  - Herr Horst, the maitre d' of Mac's Place.
  - Karl Triller, the head bartender of Mac's Place, although his last name is not mentioned until Twilight at Mac's Place.
  - Stan Burmser is Padillo's handler in Cold War Swap, has roles in Cast a Yellow Shadow and The Backup Men, and makes a very brief appearance in Mac's Place.
- Artie Wu and Quincy Durant, con men/adventurers, and their associate Maurice "Otherguy" Overby are in Chinaman's Chance, Out on the Rim, and Voodoo, Ltd. Booth Stallings, expert on terrorism, and Georgia Blue, cashiered Secret Service agent, join them in the latter two.
  - "Boy" Howdy, an Australian adventurer, is featured in Out on the Rim. He is mentioned in passing in Missionary Stew.
  - Howard Mott, a Washington lawyer and son-in-law of Booth Stallings, has cameo roles or is mentioned in several novels including Twilight at Mac's Place, in which he plays a fairly important part.
- Ione Gamble, an actress and director, is a central character in Voodoo, Ltd. and is seen briefly in Ah, Treachery!.
- Draper Haere, political money raiser, is a central character in Missionary Stew and is mentioned in Ah, Treachery.
- Minor Jackson and Nicolae Ploscaru, central characters in The Eighth Dwarf, are mentioned in Ah, Treachery.
- Chubb Dunjee is the protagonist of The Mordida Man and is mentioned in Voodoo, Ltd.

In the five Philip St. Ives novels (as by Oliver Bleeck):

- Myron Greene, a New York corporation attorney on Madison Avenue, has a peripheral role as St. Ives's friend, lawyer, and business agent in all five books.
- Eddie the bellhop and Sid the bartender are very minor characters fleetingly mentioned from time to time in the various books as being employees of the Manhattan hotel where St. Ives resides.
- Sergeant Herbert Fastnaught of the Washington, D.C., Metropolitan Police has a secondary role in both The Brass Go-Between and No Questions Asked, by which time he has been promoted to lieutenant.
