= Running Before the Wind =

1987 book by Linda Woolverton

- First edition cover
- Author: Linda Woolverton
- Cover artist: Darryl Zudeck
- Language: English
- Genre: Young adult
- Publisher: Houghton Mifflin Harcourt
- Publication date: April 1, 1987
- Publication place: United States
- Media type: Print (Hardback)
- Pages: 168 (first edition)
- ISBN: 0-395-42116-0
- OCLC: 14412450
- LC Class: PZ7.W88715 Ru 1987
- Preceded by: Star Wind

Running Before the Wind is a young adult novel by American screenwriter and film producer Linda Woolverton, published in 1987 by Houghton Mifflin Harcourt.

== Plot summary ==
For thirteen-year-old Kelly, running is like running away from the anger and the pain - it lets her forget, at least for a few miles a day, just how much she hurts. But when she is invited to join the junior high track team, Kelly's father dashes her hopes with a blunt "No". Kelly knows there is little she can say to change his mind. In fact, she is afraid of saying anything at all. Kelly lives in fear of her father. He could be nice for days, then lash out in frightening violence. While her mother and sister will do anything to keep the peace, Kelly refuses to pretend that nothing is wrong. Then suddenly, miracously, Kelly is freed from her father's unpredictable rage. But now she feels trapped in a life filled with anger and violence of her own.

== Development ==
After quitting her job as a CBS executive in 1984, Linda Woolverton began working as a substitute teacher; it was during that time that she penned Running Before the Wind. By then, she had already written a novel, Star Wind, which was published one year earlier than Running Before the Wind, also by Houghton Mifflin Harcourt.

== Legacy ==
It was due to Running Before the Wind that Woolverton got the screenwriting job in Disney Animation's Beauty and the Beast in the late 1980s. She had taken a copy of the book to the studio, which ended up being read by then Disney Chairman Jeffrey Katzenberg, who then called her for an interview.

== Reviews ==
- "[T]he emotional intensity of Woolverton's narrative will hold readers as the plot, much like a paced long-distance race, drives to its finish." School Library Journal
