= Star Wind =

Book by Linda Woolverton

- First edition cover
- Author: Linda Woolverton
- Cover artist: Paul Mock
- Language: English
- Genre: Young adult
- Publisher: Houghton Mifflin Harcourt
- Publication date: April 28, 1986
- Publication place: United States
- Media type: Print (Hardback)
- Pages: 192 (first edition)
- ISBN: 0-395-41454-7
- OCLC: 13064764
- LC Class: PZ7.W88715 St 1986
- Followed by: Running Before the Wind

Star Wind is a young adult novel by American writer Linda Woolverton, published in 1986 by Houghton Mifflin Harcourt.

== Plot summary ==
When she returns home from summer camp, Camden Douglas finds that her best friend Mitch is running with a new group. They're followers of an older teen who calls himself WT-3 and tells the "kidsters" that "grownies" are "double ungood" bosses who give children no rights. Miffed at her busy parents, Cadmen plunges in, but a series of nightmarish dreams reveal the truth.

== Development ==
Linda Woolverton was a CBS employee when she penned Star Wind during her lunch breaks. It was her first book and was published by Houghton Mifflin Harcourt, which would also publish her second book, Running Before the Wind.

== Excerpts from reviews ==
- "Although the allegorical dream world gets a bit didactic, this is a fine novel with surprising twists and a particularly astute portrayal of the allure and danger for young people of secret societies, cults and drugs." Publishers Weekly
- "Readers will agree with Camden as, toward the end of the book, she snarls, "I've just about had enough of you and your power-units and your secret language and your stupid Game." Suggest Bradbury's Fahrenheit 451 instead." School Library Journal
- "Woolverton's creative dramatic experience shows in this book; it's action filled." Voice of Youth Advocates
