= Homeward Bound II: Lost in San Francisco =

1996 film by David R. Ellis

- Theatrical release poster
- Directed by: David R. Ellis
- Written by: Chris Hauty; Julie Hickson
- Based on: The Incredible Journey; Sheila Burnford
- Produced by: Barry Jossen
- Starring: Robert Hays; Kim Greist; Veronica Lauren; Kevin Chevalia; Benj Thall
- Cinematography: Jack Conroy
- Edited by: Peter E. Berger; Michael A. Stevenson
- Music by: Bruce Broughton
- Production company: Walt Disney Pictures
- Distributed by: Buena Vista Pictures Distribution
- Release date: March 8, 1996
- Running time: 89 minutes
- Country: United States
- Language: English
- Box office: $32.7 million

Homeward Bound II: Lost in San Francisco is a 1996 American adventure comedy film and the sequel to the 1993 film Homeward Bound: The Incredible Journey directed by David R. Ellis in his feature film directorial debut. The film features the three pets from the first film, Shadow the Golden Retriever (voiced by Ralph Waite, replacing Don Ameche after the latter's death in 1993), Sassy the Himalayan cat (Sally Field), and Chance the American Bulldog (Michael J. Fox). It also features the voice work of Sinbad, Carla Gugino, Tisha Campbell-Martin, Stephen Tobolowsky, Jon Polito, Adam Goldberg, Al Michaels, Tommy Lasorda and Bob Uecker. In addition, Robert Hays, Kim Greist, Veronica Lauren, Kevin Chevalia and Benj Thall reprised their roles for the sequel.

The movie was met with mixed critical reception overall, while it fared better with audiences. The film was released by Buena Vista Pictures Distribution on March 8, 1996, and went on to gross over $32 million at the box office.

== Plot ==
Three years after the events of the first film, the Seaver family, owners of Shadow the Golden Retriever, Sassy the Himalayan cat, and Chance the American Bulldog, are about to take a vacation to Canada, and have decided to bring their pets with them. At the San Francisco International Airport, the animals escape after Chance panics while mistaking airport workers for the workers at the pound, after his earlier actions angered Jamie causing Chance to believe that Jamie was sending him back to the pound. In a frenzy, Chance breaks free from his carrier. Shadow and Sassy follow his lead, and together after eluding airport authorities, the animals find themselves in the city of San Francisco. With home on the other side of the Golden Gate Bridge, the trio set out to once again find their way back.

As their journey begins, Chance unintentionally runs into a Boxer and his Bullmastiff friend; named Ashcan and Pete, respectively. Territorial of their terrain, Ashcan refuses to let them pass. As Shadow attempts to explain to them that they are only seeking to find their way home, Ashcan and Pete threaten that they are going to eat Sassy. Shadow begins to fight Ashcan, while Sassy hides safely high upon a nearby window sill. A group of streetwise stray animals known as Riley's Gang, join the confrontation and help overpower Ashcan and Pete. The group explains to the trio that the city is not a safe place for domesticated pets. In the scuffle, Chance had run for safety. Riley sends a member of the gang named Delilah to find him, where she explains that they mean no harm.

Shadow and Sassy make their way through downtown with the rest of Riley's Gang. When a vehicle known as the "Blood Red Van" appears, Riley instructs that they all take cover and explains that the van takes stray dogs off the streets to a place called "the Lab". He further explains that he avoids cars, due to their relation to humans, and he does not trust humans at all. Acknowledging their differences regarding humans, Shadow and Sassy express their thanks to the group and continue to make their way towards the Golden Gate Bridge. While Chance and Delilah make their way through the city, Chance asks about Riley's distrust of humans. She explains that Riley was adopted as a puppy by a married couple as a Christmas gift for their child, but the child did not want him and Riley was promptly abandoned. Having to adapt to survive as a stray, he created his gang to protect all stray animals from humans. When they make their way through the park, Chance begins to be romantically interested in Delilah.

As Shadow and Sassy continue through the city, Ashcan and Pete continue following them. The pair come upon a housefire, caused by one of the "Blood Red Van" drivers carelessly discarding a lit cigarette into a patch of dry grass. Upon hearing the discussion of frantic parents and the San Francisco Fire Department Battalion Chief, they realize that a young boy and his kitten are still inside the house. Shadow rushes into the home through the basement window to rescue the boy, while Sassy follows after him in search of the kitten. Shadow exits moments later with the boy by his side, as the porch collapses following a sudden backdraft of flames. Sassy joins the rest with the kitten, thereafter. Upon witnessing their heroics, Riley and his gang praise their actions and resolve to help them find Chance before returning to the gang's hideout. Upon arriving, they discover that Chance and Delilah are already there. Riley begins to explain to the romantic couple that they are too different for each other, but together they disagree with his assessment and sleep outside the safe haven.

The following morning, Chance begins to chew on a tyre without noticing the "Blood Red Van" approaching. He is captured and abducted by its drivers, who intend to take him back to "the lab". As the vehicle drives off, all of the animals work together to stop the van and free Chance as well as the other dogs in its cages. As the drivers try to avoid the attacking animals, a member of the gang named Bando enters the van, puts it in reverse, and backs it into the water. Reunited, the animals celebrate their victory. Delilah begins to explain to Chance that they may be too different for each other after all, only for him to run away from the group in frustration. Riley agrees to accompany and help Shadow and Sassy reach the Golden Gate Bridge. Just before crossing the bridge, the pair are once again ambushed by Ashcan and Pete. Chance joins the fight, scaring off the attackers. Together again, the trio cross the Golden Gate Bridge and find their owners.

The family returns home with their three pets: Chance, Shadow, and Sassy; though Chance is still saddened about his perceived loss of Delilah. Shortly thereafter during a family picnic, Delilah joins them having found her way to their home. Bob agrees to allow having another dog in the family. Chance and Delilah are reunited, as the family continues having their meal.

== Cast ==
- Robert Hays as Bob Seaver
- Kim Greist as Laura Seaver
- Benj Thall as Peter Seaver
- Veronica Lauren as Hope Seaver
- Kevin Chevalia as Jamie Seaver
- Michael Rispoli as Jack
- Max Perlich as Ralph
- Keegan MacIntosh as Tucker
- Sandra Ferens as Tucker's Mom
- Andrew Airlie as Tucker's Dad
- Will Sasso as Pizza Boy

=== Voice cast ===
- Michael J. Fox - Chance, the American Bulldog
- Carla Gugino as Delilah, the Kuvasz
- Sally Field as Sassy, the Himalayan cat
- Ralph Waite as Shadow, the Golden Retriever
- Jon Polito as Ashcan, the Boxer
- Adam Goldberg as Pete the Bullmastiff
- Sinbad as Riley the Labrador Retriever-mix
- Tisha Campbell-Martin as Sledge, the Shetland Collie-Mix
- Stephen Tobolowsky as Bando, the Bluetick Coonhound
- Michael Bell as Stokey, the Portuguese Podengo
- Ross Malinger as Spike, the Jack Russell Terrier
- Al Michaels as Sparky Michaels, the Rough Collie
- Tommy Lasorda as Lucky Lasorda, the Black and White Havanese
- Bob Uecker as Trixie Uecker, the German Shepherd
- Tress MacNeille as French Poodle
- Jeff Fischer as various characters (uncredited)

== Release ==
=== Home media ===
Homeward Bound II: Lost in San Francisco was released on VHS and LaserDisc on July 31, 1996, by Walt Disney Home Video. It was released on DVD on April 23, 2002, by Walt Disney Home Entertainment.

== Reception ==
=== Critical response ===
The film received an overall mixed reception. The film holds a 56% aggregated critic approval rating on Rotten Tomatoes based on 18 reviews, indicating a below-average viewing score. Noted film critic Stephen Holden praised elements of the film stating: "Homeward Bound 2 may not entirely avoid the coyness and sticky sentiment associated with Hollywood anthropomorphism. But it does a better job than most family films in projecting a child's-eye view of a world where siblings and pets are equally cherished members of the family." Audiences polled by CinemaScore gave the film an average rating of "B+", on an A+ to F scale.

=== Box office ===
The film opened in 2,129 theatres on March 8, 1996, and grossed $8,605,649. Debuting at #2 at the box office, Homeward Bound II: Lost in San Francisco remained in theatres for approximately five weekends. The movie's entire box office run earned over $32,772,492 in domestic ticket sales.
