= Daniel Litman =

Israeli film and television actor (born 1990)

- דניאל ליטמן
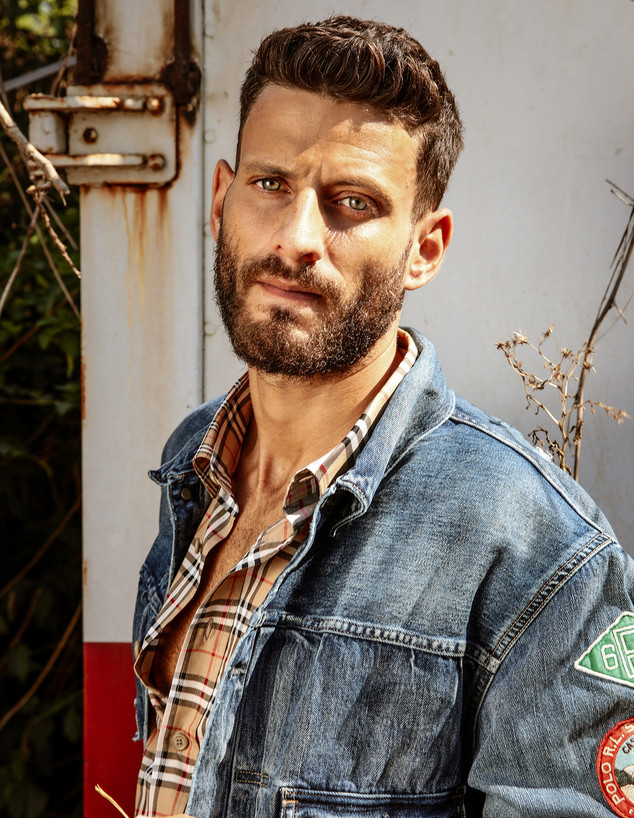
- Born: 19 October 1990 (age 35); Haifa, Israel
- Occupations: Actor; model
- Spouse: Shiri Lubel (m. 2022)
- Children: 1

Daniel Litman (Hebrew: דניאל ליטמן; born 19 October 1990) is an Israeli film, television and stage actor and model. Early in his career, Litman became a well-established actor in the children's and youth genre of Israeli television. Notably, he played Daniel Goren in yes series, The Greenhouse (2012–2016). He later made a successful transition into primetime television and starred in the second season of Channel 2 espionage drama series, Mossad 101 (2017–2018), as well as HOT 3 telenovela, Baalat HaChalomot (2021–2022) alongside Odeya Rush. He has also had lead roles in high-profile Israeli films such as Victory (2023) and Krav Avir (2023).

He has also appeared in a number of international projects, such as the UK's BBC espionage series, The Little Drummer Girl (2018), based on the 1983 novel of the same name by John le Carré. He also starred in the Israeli-Norwegian co-production thriller series, The Girl from Oslo (2021).

In 2021, he began starring alongside Amit Rahav in Habima Theatre's stage production The One My Soul Loves, which was inspired by the 2009 Tel Aviv gay centre shooting.

== Early life ==
Litman was born and raised in Haifa, Israel, to Ashkenazi and Sephardic Jewish parents, Avi, a plumbing contractor and Liza, a beautician, who later pursued a drama degree and opened a design store. Litman's family Jewish ethnicity is Moroccan-Sephardic, Romanian, Bulgarian and Greek.

He grew up with an older brother, Or.

He completed his mandatory military service with the Israel Defense Forces in a non-combat role as he's an asthmatic. He served as a Security Non-Commissioned Officer (NCO) in HaKirya.

== Career ==
Early in his career, Litman was cast in a number of children's and youth-oriented television shows, becoming a well-established name among this audience. Among these roles, he played Daniel Goren, an athlete in yes teen-drama series, The Greenhouse from 2012 to 2016.

In 2015 he performed and sang with the Israeli military ensembles at the Festigal festival, alongside Omer Dror and Yardena Arazi.

In 2016, at the age of 25, he expressed a desire to transition out of the youth genre with his TV projects, and act in projects targeting an adult audience. He also revealed that he had turned down television hosting gigs so as to focus on this goal. He made his primetime debut the following year, starring alongside Yehuda Levi and Tzachi Halevy in the second season of Channel 2's Mossad 101. The series, which Litman partially filmed in Kyiv, Ukraine, also featured his first nude scene. The series later became available internationally on Netflix.

In 2018 he appeared alongside Alexander Skarsgård and Florence Pugh in the BBC One series, The Little Drummer Girl, an adaptation of the 1983 novel of the same name by John le Carré. He played the role of Daniel, an Israeli Mossad agent. Skarsgård spoke about the extreme importance of having Israelis on set: "Through them I was able to understand more about the material we are dealing with. They gave us a real opening to learn and understand the characters."

In 2021 he appeared in the Israeli-Norwegian thriller series, The Girl from Oslo, which aired internationally on Netflix. Litman has spoken about the intensity of playing, Nadav, an Israeli musician taken hostage during a vacation in the Sinai Peninsula: "as an actor I went into a state of mind of paralyzing fear... I knew I had to go all the way."

In 2021, he starred alongside Odeya Rush and Angel Bonanni in HOT 3 telenovela series, Baalat HaChalomot (2021).

In 2021, he shared the role of Adam with Yadin Gellman in Itai Segal's The One My Soul Loves at the Habima Theatre. The play is based on the true events of the Tel Aviv gay centre shooting and Litman plays the boyfriend of the protagonist, Yehonatan (Amit Rahav). He returned to the role for a second run at Habima Theatre in December 2023.

In 2023, he starred in two film projects set during the Six Day War. He plays an Israeli Air Force pilot in Krav Avir. He also stars in the musical Victory. Haaretz described the film as "a colorful yet surprisingly complex musical that is all too relevant to today's Israel."

He was initially cast in the 2024 docudrama series, Martin Scorsese Presents: The Saints, however, the offer was withdrawn as he was told that he looked "too Ashkenazi" for the part and that they wanted an actor with an "Eastern look."

Wait for Me, a maritime drama, which he filmed during the pandemic, was released in Israeli theatres in 2025. Litman portrays a Greek Cypriot skipper and speaks English with a Greek accent.

As a model, he starred in the summer 2025 campaign for Castro. He also starred in a 2026 jeans campaign for Castro, with Bar Refaeli and Israel Atias.

In August 2026, he began performing in a stage musical adaptation of Around the World in Eighty Days by Jules Verne and playing the protagonist, Phileas Fogg at Expo Tel Aviv.

== Personal life ==
In 2012, he survived a serious case of Guillain–Barré syndrome and slowly became paralyzed. He was told by doctors that he would never walk again. He made a full recovery, regaining his functions and had to relearn how to speak and write again, as well as walk.

In 2022, he married Shiri Lubel. They have a son together, born in 2024.

Since the 2023 Hamas-led attack on Israel on October 7, he has been visiting Israelis evacuated from their homes and wounded civilians and soldiers. He and his wife lost two close friends at the Re'im music festival massacre and another friend was taken hostage.

He is opposed to the exemption from military service for Haredi Israelis.

He supports Maccabi Haifa F.C..

== Filmography ==
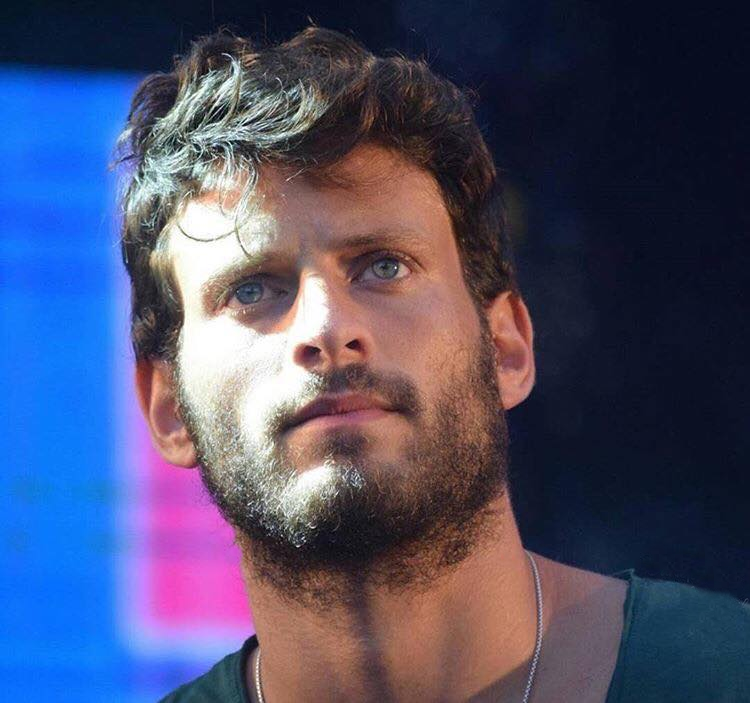
Daniel Litman in 2016

Year	Title	Role	Notes
2012–2016	The Greenhouse	Daniel Goren	Series regular
2015	What Doesn't Kill You	Soldier #1	Short film
2016	Ne'elamim	Itay Goldin	Episode 1.1
2016	Yom Haem	Michael	
2016	Disabled	Lior	Short film
2016	Ne'elamim	Itay Goldin	Episode 1.1
2016	Yom Haem	Michael	Series regular
2016	Disabled	Lior	Short film
2017	Shilton Hatzlalim		
2017	Naor's Friends	Oz	Episode 4.3
2016-2018	Shchuna	Johnny	Series regular
2017-2018	Mossad 101	Tubi Miller	Series regular
2018	The Little Drummer Girl	Daniel	Series regular
2018-2019	Kadabra	Luk	4 episodes
2017–2020	Tzafoof	Daniel 'Ha-Ben'	7 episodes
2020	Taagad (Charlie Golf One)	Omer	Series regular
2021	The Girl from Oslo	Nadav	
2021-2022	Baalat HaChalomot	Yehuda Warburg	Series regular, seasons 1 & 2
2022	Wait for Me	Nikos Constantinos	
2023	Victory	Amos Agmon	
2023	Krav Avir	Eitan Rom	

== Stage ==
Year	Title	Role	Venue	Ref.
2021	The One My Soul Loves	Adam	Habima Theatre	
