= Bad Company (1995 film) =

- Promotional poster
- Directed by: Damian Harris
- Written by: Ross Thomas
- Produced by: Jeffrey Chernov; Amedeo Ursini
- Starring: Ellen Barkin; Laurence Fishburne; Frank Langella; Michael Beach; David Ogden Stiers; Michael Murphy
- Cinematography: Jack N. Green
- Edited by: Stuart H. Pappé
- Music by: Carter Burwell
- Production company: Touchstone Pictures
- Distributed by: Buena Vista Pictures Distribution
- Release date: January 20, 1995
- Running time: 108 minutes
- Country: United States
- Language: English
- Box office: $3,674,841

Bad Company is a 1995 American neo-noir thriller film directed by Damian Harris and written by Ross Thomas.

The film stars Ellen Barkin and Laurence Fishburne as former CIA operatives engaging in a dubious romance while plotting to murder their boss, played by Frank Langella, and take over his firm, which specializes in blackmail and corporate espionage. The film has a supporting cast that includes Michael Beach, David Ogden Stiers, Daniel Hugh Kelly, Spalding Gray, James Hong, and Michael Murphy.

Bad Company would go on to gross just over $3.6 million in a limited theatrical release in the United States. Though the film drew mostly negative reviews from critics, it has since enjoyed lucrative success in the home video market.

== Plot ==
In Seattle, former CIA officer Nelson Crowe is hired by Vic Grimes for a position with his company nicknamed "The Toolshed." Grimes' firm employs people with intelligence service backgrounds to sell their talents with regard to extortion and corporate espionage to domestic and foreign corporations. Grimes' second in command, Margaret Wells begins working with Crowe and seduces him, enticing him with a plot to murder Grimes so they can take over the firm.

The Toolshed's top client, Curl Industries, is being sued in a class action lawsuit in a case currently on appeal at the Washington Supreme Court. Curl Industries is accused of poisoning the water supply to a small town, resulting in the birth of disabled children. Crowe and Wells blackmail Curl Industries' CEO, Walter Curl, into resigning after breaking into his house and catching him having sex with his niece Wanda, who had been secretly paid by The Toolshed and is in on the job. Grimes gives Crowe $1 million to bribe one of the justices, Justin Beach, into swinging the verdict in favor of Curl Industries.

Crowe and Toolshed operative Todd Stapp buy Justice Beach's $25,000 gambling debt from bookmaker Bobby Birdsong and pay for information on Beach's personal life from his friend, Les Goodwin. During a secret progress report meeting, Crowe is revealed to in fact be a mole for the CIA, albeit against his will. Crowe was dismissed from the agency on suspicion of stealing a $50,000 bribe meant for an Iraqi colonel.

Crowe's former boss, William "Smitty" Smithfield, is threatening prison time for the disappearance of the bribe as leverage to get Crowe to infiltrate the Toolshed. The CIA intends to acquire the firm and use it as a black operations hub with Smitty in charge. During the meeting, as he turns over the $1 million bribe money for inspection, Crowe secretly records his conversation with Smitty, who also forces him to sign a receipt. Stapp later discovers Crowe's secret objective and extorts a payoff from Smitty to remain silent about it.

Beach accepts the $1 million bribe delivered by Crowe. He and his mistress Julie Ames sign a receipt to ensure Beach's cooperation. Beach buys tickets for a flight to the Caribbean and sends Julie ahead with the money, telling her he intends to leave his wife and join her. After reneging on his agreement and voting against Curl Industries, Beach commits suicide.

Despite the setback caused by Beach's death and his vote, Wells and Crowe continue with their plan to murder Grimes. Wells spends a romantic weekend with Grimes at his fishing cabin. Crowe sneaks in and shoots Grimes, then beats Wells to make it appear like the murder was a robbery gone wrong.

Wells and Crowe then take over the Toolshed, though Wells now rebuffs Crowe's affections towards her, having used him to get what she wanted. Upon hearing of her lover's death, Julie travels to Europe, sending Goodwin postcards telling him how she's enjoying spending the $1 million. Goodwin sells this information to Crowe, who takes it to Wells. Wells orders Crowe to find and kill Julie because of her knowledge of the bribe attempt. Smitty confronts Wells in her office at the Toolshed and informs her of the CIA's plan to take over and also of Crowe's involvement in the agency's infiltration.

Julie buys a gun from Goodwin and goes to Crowe's apartment to kill him in revenge for Beach's death. She arrives shortly after Wells, who also came to kill Crowe. In a chaotic shootout, Julie blindly fires at both as Crowe and Wells shoot each other dead.

Julie somehow remains unharmed. As she meticulously picks up her shell casings, she finds Crowe's briefcase containing incriminating evidence, including the tape of his conversations with Smitty and the receipt she and Beach signed. After burning the receipt, Julie mails the tape to the U.S. Attorney's office to expose the corrupt dealings of both the CIA and the Toolshed. She then leaves town for good, alone.

== Cast ==
- Ellen Barkin as Margaret Wells
- Laurence Fishburne as Nelson Crowe
- Frank Langella as Vic Grimes
- Michael Beach as Tod Stapp
- Gia Carides as Julie Ames
- David Ogden Stiers as Judge Justin Beach
- Daniel Hugh Kelly as Les Goodwin
- Spalding Gray as Walter Curl
- James Hong as Bobby Birdsong
- Tegan West as Al
- Michelle Beaudoin as Wanda
- Michael Murphy as William "Smitty" Smithfield (uncredited)

== Critical reception ==
The film received mostly negative reviews from critics. As of December 30, 2010, the review aggregator Rotten Tomatoes reported that 27% of critics gave the film positive reviews, based on 11 reviews. Audiences polled by CinemaScore gave the film an average grade of "C" on an A+ to F scale.
