= Fantastic Voyage (disambiguation) =

Fantastic Voyage is a 1966 science fiction film starring Stephen Boyd and Raquel Welch and novelized by Isaac Asimov

Fantastic Voyage may also refer to:

- Imaginary voyage
- Fantastic Voyage (TV series), a 1968 animated series spun off from the film
- Fantastic Voyage II: Destination Brain, a 1987 science fiction novel by Isaac Asimov
- "Fantastic Voyage" (David Bowie song), 1979
- "Fantastic Voyage" (Lakeside song), 1980
- "Fantastic Voyage" (Coolio song), 1994
- Fantastic Voyage (album), a 1980 album by Lakeside
- Fantastic Voyage: The Greatest Hits, a 2001 compilation album by rapper Coolio
- Fantastic Voyage: Live Long Enough to Live Forever, a 2004 non-fiction book by Ray Kurzweil and Terry Grossman
- Fantastic Voyage (video game), a video game published by Fox Video Games and released in 1982
- Fantastic Voyage (1984), a video game developed by Quicksilva and released in 1984
- Fantastic Voyage (1991), a video game for Amiga, developed by Centaur and released in 1991

== See also ==
- Fantastic Journey (disambiguation)
- Voyages extraordinaires, a series of science fiction novels of Jules Verne
