= Monument (film) =

2026 film

- Theatrical release poster
- Directed by: Bryan Singer
- Written by: Alena Alova
- Produced by: Jason Taylor; Bryan Singer; Guy Shalem; Yariv Horowitz
- Starring: Joseph Mazzello; Jon Voight; Aviv Pinkas; Ori Pfeffer; Alon Abutbul; Igal Naor
- Cinematography: Ziv Berkovich
- Edited by: Benj Thall
- Music by: Kenneth Lampl
- Production companies: Bad Hat Harry; Freedom Films
- Distributed by: Abramorama
- Release date: March 20, 2026
- Running time: 113 minutes
- Country: United States
- Language: English

Monument is a 2026 American historical drama film directed by Bryan Singer and written by Alena Alova. The film stars Joseph Mazzello and Jon Voight as real-life Israeli architects Amnon and Yaakov Rechter. It also stars Ori Pfeffer, Alon Abutbul, Igal Naor, and Aviv Pinkas.

Set in 1999 in south Lebanon and Israel, the narrative of the true story follows father and son architects tasked by the Israeli government and the South Lebanon Army to build a controversial war memorial honoring fallen Christian soldiers.

The film was director Bryan Singer's first in eight years, following a career break after sexual abuse allegations. It was filmed in Greece in late 2023.

Monument opened on March 20, 2026, in New York City and Somerset County, New Jersey. It was described as a "surprise film" and received very little marketing or promotion.

== Plot ==
The film is set in 1999 in south Lebanon and Israel. It follows father and son architects (Yaakov Rechter, and his son Amnon Rechter), who are tasked by the Israeli government and the South Lebanon Army to build a controversial war memorial in south Lebanon honoring fallen Christian soldiers. The plot is based on a true story.

== Cast ==
- Joseph Mazzello as Amnon Rechter, a promising young architect.
- Jon Voight as Yaakov Rechter, Amnon's father, a highly celebrated Israeli architect.
- Ori Pfeffer as Ben Brodesky, security head
- Igal Naor as General Antoine Lahad, leader of the South Lebanon Army
- Alon Abutbul as Uri Lubrani, Israeli diplomat
- Aviv Pinkas as Osnat Rechter, wife of Amnon Rechter

== Production ==
=== Development and casting ===
The concept for Monument originated after director Bryan Singer met the contemporary Israeli architect Amnon Rechter in Israel. The father-son dynamic of the script, written by Alena Alova, influenced the casting. Joseph Mazzello accepted the lead role of Amnon because it resonated with him personally given the loss of his own father, and he sought to channel the emotional weight of a son building a legacy alongside an aging patriarch.

=== Filming ===
Cinematography was handled by Ziv Berkovich. Production design replicated late-1990s military transport aesthetics, reflecting the claustrophobia and tension of armored border crossings into active security zones. The music is by Kenneth Lampl.

== Release ==
Monument was distributed to select theaters across the United States, opening on March 20, 2026. The rollout was supported by independent cultural showcases and special regional screenings. These included panels highlighting the historical events and architectural history at institutions such as the Center for Jewish History in New York City.

== Reception ==
Film Threat's Bobby LePire wrote that "Monument is an engaging and dramatic look at an unknown true story". He praised the cast, "led by an outstanding Mazzello", and commented that Bryan Singer "never lost his touch in his time away from the camera. He directs with an eye toward the script's emotions and the creation of tension in the perilous setting. A few minor faults keep it from being perfect, but it sure is close".

In his review for The Detroit Jewish News, John O'Neill called the film "a classic formula of man versus state and man versus self (with the bonus conflict of father versus son)".

Curt Schleier in theJewish Standard concluded that "Monument is an intelligent, exciting, and suspenseful movie about building a peace bridge in the Middle East, specifically Lebanon".

Steven Silver of Splice Today called it "a well-produced and well-put-together treatment of the story", but criticized that "it also leaves a lot out" as well as the attempt to manufacture drama by having Amnon Rechter lie to his wife about the project.
