= Aviv Pinkas =

Actress and screenwriter

- Born: March 12, 1992 (age 34); Tel Aviv, Israel
- Occupations: Actress and television screenwriter
- Years active: 2013–present
- Known for: Acting in the films Kiss Me Kosher and Monument
- Spouse: Gil Landau

Aviv Pinkas (Hebrew: אביב פנקס; born March 12, 1992) is an Israeli actress and television screenwriter. She has performed in domestic television dramas, international co-productions, and theatrical projects, including Kiss Me Kosher and Monument.

== Early life and education ==
Pinkas was born in Tel Aviv, Israel. She relocated with her family to the kibbutz of Ein Carmel in northern Israel at age one. She trained in ballet from a young age, and traveled to Tel Aviv for regional theater youth courses during her early years. Following her compulsory military service as a welfare NCO (Meshakit Tash), she pursued professional training in dramatic arts at the Yoram Loewenstein Performing Arts Studio in Tel Aviv, from which she graduated in 2016.

== Career ==
Pinkas began her professional career in 2013, appearing initially in youth programming such as Flashback and Nalaim. In 2016 when she was cast as Dana in the television medical drama series Charlie Golf One (Taagad). Following her television debut, she branched into stage acting, performing at the Beit Lessin Theater in Tel Aviv.

In 2020, Pinkas portrayed Ella Shalev in the German-Israeli romantic comedy film Kiss Me Kosher (also released internationally as Kiss Me Before It Blows Up). That same year, she secured a primary role as Yael in the historical television drama series Palmach (Rising), set during the British Mandate era. Pinkas also joined the production's writing staff, serving as a television screenwriter for the series during its second and third seasons.

Pinkas continued television work in 2022, co-starring as Noam Gutman in the romantic comedy series Bloody Murray, which received international exposure at festivals including Series Mania in Lille, France. In 2023, she portrayed Batya Werbin in the historical feature film and mini-series The Stronghold (HaMizach), centered on the events of the Yom Kippur War.

She transitioned into international productions, joining the cast of the political thriller series The Girl from Oslo (Season 2) as a Mossad agent, with filming taking place in Athens, Greece. She starred in the 2026 American drama feature film Monument directed by Bryan Singer, starring alongside Joseph Mazzello (as her husband) and Jon Voight (as her father-in-law).

== Personal life ==
Pinkas is married to Israeli musician Gil Landau, the co-founder and guitarist of the indie pop band Lola Marsh. They have one child.

== Filmography ==
=== Television ===
Year	Title	Role	Notes
2016	Charlie Golf One (Taagad)	Dana	Recurring role (Season 1)
2016	Flashback		Youth series
2017	Nalaim		Youth series
2020–2022	Palmach (Rising)	Yael	Main role; also screenwriter (Seasons 2–3)
2021	Shababnikim	Keshet	Guest role (4 episodes)
2022	Bloody Murray	Noam Gutman	Main role
2023	The Stronghold (HaMizach)	Batya Werbin	Mini-series adaptation
2025	The Girl from Oslo	Adva / Michal	Season 2 main cast; Mossad agent

=== Film ===
Year	Title	Role	Notes
2018	Broken Mirrors	Aviv	Feature film
2020	Kiss Me Kosher	Ella Shalev	German-Israeli co-production
2023	The Stronghold	Batya Werbin	Feature film adaptation
2026	Monument	Osnat Rechter	International feature film
