= Fantastic Journey =

Fantastic Journey may refer to any of the following:

- Imaginary voyage
- The Fantastic Journey, a science fiction series from 1977 that lasted 10 episodes.
- The Fantastic Flying Journey, a novel of Gerald Durrell
- Gokujo Parodius, also known as Fantastic Journey, a video game

== See also ==
- Fantastic Voyage (disambiguation)
- Magical Journey, an album by Taiwanese girl group S.H.E.
- The Incredible Journey, a novel by Sheila Burnford
- Voyages Extraordinaires, a series of science fiction novels of Jules Verne
