= Jeffrey Chernov =

American film producer

- Born: United States
- Occupation: Film producer

Jeffrey Chernov is an American film producer, unit production manager and executive.

He was the Vice President of Physical Production for Walt Disney Pictures and Television/Touchstone Pictures/Hollywood Pictures from 1987 through 1989 and the Senior Vice President of Physical Production at Spyglass Entertainment from 2001 through 2005.

He has also served as a first and second assistant director. Early in his career, he frequently collaborated with filmmaker John Carpenter.

During his time with Disney/Touchstone/Hollywood, Chernov oversaw production on such films as Dead Poets Society and Pretty Woman. Afterwards, he became an independent producer, although he would produce or executive produce a number of movies for Touchstone.

In 2001 he was appointed Senior VP of production at Spyglass. He is credited as production executive on many films produced by Spyglass.

Chernov made his directorial debut with A Line in the Sand, which he is also producing.

He recently worked as executive producer on Star Trek for J. J. Abrams and Paramount Pictures, replacing Stratton Leopold. His son Max and daughter Zoe had small roles in the film as a young Spock's Vulcan schoolmates.

== Filmography ==
- Richard Pryor: Live in Concert (1979) – associate producer
- Escape from New York (1981) – second assistant director
- Body Heat (1981) – second assistant director
- Halloween II (1981) – production manager
- The Thing (1982) – second assistant director
- Halloween III: Season of the Witch (1982) – unit production manager, executive in charge of production
- The Dead Zone (1983) – associate producer
- Fire and Ice (1982) – live-action production supervisor
- Children of the Corn (1984) – production executive
- The Philadelphia Experiment (1984) – first assistant director
- Starman (1984) – Second Unit first assistant director
- Clue (1985) – associate producer, Unit Production Manager
- Ruthless People (1986) – Unit Production Manager
- Eddie Murphy Raw (1987) – Co-producer, Production Manager
- Johnny Be Good (1988) – Co-producer, Unit Production Manager
- Sleeping with the Enemy (1991) – executive producer
- Homeward Bound: The Incredible Journey (1993) – producer
- Father Hood (1993) – executive producer
- Bad Company (1995) – producer
- First Kid (1996) – Co-producer
- Desperate Measures (1998) – executive producer
- Holy Man (1998) – executive producer
- 10 Things I Hate About You (1999) – executive producer
- The Replacements (2000) – executive producer
- The Country Bears (2002) – producer
- Reign of Fire (2002) – production executive
- The Recruit (2003) – production executive
- Shanghai Knights (2003) – production executive
- Connie and Carla (2004) – production executive
- The Pacifier (2005) – production executive
- The Hitchhiker's Guide to the Galaxy (2005) – production executive
- Stay Alive (2006) – production executive
- Stick It (2006) – production executive
- The Lookout (2007) – production executive
- The Invisible (2007) – production executive
- Underdog (2007) – production executive
- Balls of Fury (2007) – production executive
- From a Place of Darkness (2008) – producer
- A Line in the Sand (2008) – Director, producer
- Star Trek (2009) – executive producer
- Battle: Los Angeles (2011) – producer
- Mission: Impossible – Ghost Protocol (2011) – executive producer
- Star Trek Into Darkness (2013) – executive producer
- Tomorrowland (2015) – producer
- Star Trek Beyond (2016) – executive producer
- Black Panther (2018) - executive producer
- Shazam! (2019) - executive producer
