= Benj Thall =

American actor

- Born: Benjamin Thall; July 10, 1978 (age 48); New York City, U.S.
- Other name: Ben Thall
- Education: University of Southern California School of Cinema-Television
- Occupations: Director, film editor, screenwriter, former child actor
- Years active: 1990–present
- Known for: Playing Peter Burnford in Homeward Bound: The Incredible Journey; Editor and co-producer of Monument

Benjamin Thall (born July 10, 1978) is an American actor best known for his role as a child actor in the movie Homeward Bound: The Incredible Journey as Peter Burnford. He later studied filmmaking at the USC School of Cinema-Television, and worked in entertainment marketing and movie trailer campaigns. In 2026, he served as editor and co-producer alongside director Bryan Singer of the historical drama feature film Monument.

== Life and acting career ==
Benj Thall was born on July 10, 1978, in New York City, New York, and grew up primarily in the Los Angeles area. His career began with him as a child actor at 11 years old in the 1990 comedy horror film Repossessed in which he played Ned Aglet. He later had guest acting roles in the early 1990s on television series, including the sitcoms Cheers and Drexell's Class.

Thall played Peter Burnford in the1993 Disney family adventure film Homeward Bound: The Incredible Journey, when he was 14 years old. He played the same role in the 1996 sequel Homeward Bound II: Lost in San Francisco. He also acted in the 1994 science fiction horror film The Puppet Masters as Jeff, and the 1996 television drama series L.A. Firefighters. His other film appearances include the 2000 drama film The Prime Gig as Tolstoy.

== Filmmaking and production career ==
After Thall was a child actor, he studied filmmaking at the USC School of Cinema-Television. He began working behind the camera, and worked as a set lighting technician, gaffer, and foley artist. He then focused on directing, editing, and screenwriting. He has produced, directed, and written various short films.

As a film editor, Thall has worked in entertainment marketing and movie trailer campaigns, on projects for studio films including Harry Potter and the Goblet of Fire (2005), Watchmen (2009), and Tron: Legacy (2010).

Thall wrote and directed the short film Penny (2010), which premiered at the 2011 Cleveland International Film Festival and screened at multiple international film events. In television, he co-created, produced, and directed the National Geographic Kids educational children's animated series Amazing Animals. The series won the 2014 Cynopsis Kids !magination Award for best interstitial series, for short-form programming under six minutes.

He later served as editor and co-producer alongside director Bryan Singer of the 2026 historical drama feature film Monument.

== Filmography ==
=== Film ===
- Repossessed (1990) - Ned Aglet
- The Haunted (TV movie; 1991) - Kid
- Homeward Bound: The Incredible Journey (1993) - Peter Burnford
- The Puppet Masters (1994) - Jeff
- Homeward Bound II: Lost in San Francisco (1996) - Peter Burnford
- The Prime Gig (2000) - Tolstoy
- Bet on Red (2014) - Garry

=== Television ===
- The Torkelsons (pilot; 1991) - Steve Floyd Torkelson
- Harry and the Hendersons (1991) - Lance
- Drexell's Class (1991) - Student
- High Incident (1996) - Stewart

=== Produced and directed ===
- Penny (Short; 2010; director and producer)
- Weird But True News (TV movie; 2015; director)
- The Secret Admirer (Short; 2017; director, writer, and editor)

=== Editor ===
- Monument (Feature film; 2026; editor, co-producer, score producer)

=== Electrician ===
- The Minus Man (1999)

== See also ==
- List of former American child actors
