= Linda Woolverton =

American screenwriter, playwright and novelist (born 1952)

- Born: December 19, 1952 (age 73); Long Beach, California, U.S.
- Education: California State University, Long Beach (BFA); California State University, Fullerton (MA)
- Occupations: Screenwriter; playwright; novelist
- Spouse: Lee Flicker (divorced)
- Children: 1
- Writing career
- Genres: Fantasy, fairy tale, comedy-drama
- Notable works: Beauty and the Beast (1991); Homeward Bound: The Incredible Journey (1993); Beauty and the Beast (musical); The Lion King (1994); Alice in Wonderland (2010); Maleficent (2014)

Linda Woolverton (born December 19, 1952) is an American screenwriter, playwright, and novelist, whose most prominent works include the screenplays and books of several acclaimed Disney films and stage musicals. She is the first woman to have written an animated feature for Disney, Beauty and the Beast (1991), which is also the first animated film ever to be nominated for the Academy Award for Best Picture. She also co-wrote the screenplay of The Lion King (1994), provided additional story material for Mulan (1998), and adapted her own Beauty and the Beast screenplay into the book of the Broadway adaptation of the film, for which she received a Tony Award nomination and won an Olivier Award.

Her recent work includes the screenplays for Alice in Wonderland (2010) and Maleficent (2014), both of which were significant box office successes. The former made her the first female screenwriter with a sole writing credit on a film that grossed $1 billion. She subsequently wrote the screenplays of the sequels for both of those films—Alice Through the Looking Glass (2016) and Maleficent: Mistress of Evil (2019).

== Early life and education ==
Woolverton was born in 1952 in Long Beach, California. As a child, she began acting in the local children's theater as an escape from what she has described as a "traumatic childhood." She graduated from high school in 1969 with honors in the school's theater program. She attended California State University, Long Beach, graduating with a BFA in theater arts in 1973. After the college graduation, she attended the California State University, Fullerton. She received her master's degree in theater for children in 1979.

== Career ==
=== First works ===
Upon the completion of her master's degree, Woolverton formed her own children's theater company. She wrote, directed and performed all over California in churches, malls, schools, and local theaters. She also began to work as a creative drama instructor in 1979. In 1980, she began working as a secretary for CBS, where she eventually became a programming executive concentrating on both children's and late-night programming. During her lunch breaks, Woolverton wrote her first novel, the young adult Star Wind. After quitting her job in 1984 and starting working as a substitute teacher, she wrote her second novel, the also young adult Running Before the Wind. Released in 1986 and 1987, respectively, both were published by Houghton Mifflin.

During this time, Woolverton began penning scripts for children's television shows. From 1986 to 1989, she wrote episodes for animated series as Star Wars: Ewoks, Dennis the Menace, The Real Ghostbusters, The Berenstain Bears, My Little Pony and Chip 'n Dale Rescue Rangers. After growing tired of writing for animated television shows, she expressed interest in working for Disney's theatrical animation studio, but was discouraged by her agent, who assessed that she "wasn't ready." Not agreeing with it, Woolverton went over to Disney offices in Burbank, California, and dropped off a copy of Running Before the Wind to a secretary, asking her to "give it to somebody to read." Two days later, she received a call from Jeffrey Katzenberg, then-Disney studio chairman, scheduling her for an interview.

=== Works for Disney ===
Woolverton was hired to write the script for Disney Feature Animation's Beauty and the Beast, thus becoming the first woman to write an animated feature for the studio. From early 1985 to 1988, two different teams of writers had taken a turn at adapting Jeanne-Marie Le Prince de Beaumont's tale into a feature film, but Woolverton succeeded by incorporating her own ideas into the story, such as making the protagonist a bookworm. Upon its release in 1991, Beauty and the Beast received universal acclaim, becoming the first animated film ever to be nominated for the Academy Award for Best Picture, and winning the Golden Globe Award for Best Motion Picture – Musical or Comedy.

The success of Beauty and the Beast led Woolverton to work in several projects with Disney. She co-wrote the screenplay of the live-action film Homeward Bound: The Incredible Journey, released in 1993, and worked again with Disney Animation by helping the pre-production story development of Aladdin, released in 1992, and co-writing the screenplay of The Lion King, released in 1994. Aladdin and The Lion King were both critical and box office hits. During this time, she also adapted her own Beauty and the Beast screenplay into a Broadway musical, which opened to critical acclaim in 1994, leading her to be nominated for a Tony Award for Best Book in a Musical and to win an Olivier Award for Best New Musical. She provided additional story material for Mulan, released in 1998, and co-wrote the book of the stage musical Aida, which opened on Broadway in 2000 to critical acclaim.

In 2007, she completed a screenplay where an older Alice, from Lewis Carroll's Alice's Adventures in Wonderland, returns to Wonderland, from an idea she had in her head for many years. She presented the screenplay to producers Suzanne Todd, Jennifer Todd, and Joe Roth, who took it to Disney. The studio immediately accepted the project, attaching Tim Burton to direct. Released in 2010, Alice in Wonderland earned more than $1 billion at the worldwide box office, making Woolverton the first female screenwriter with a sole writing credit on a film that grossed $1 billion.

In 2010, Disney invited her to write the screenplay of Maleficent, a retelling of the animated film Sleeping Beauty from the point of view of the titular villain. As with Beauty and the Beast, the film had been in development hell until Woolverton was attached to write it. She later described her version of the tale as a complete "reinvention, not just the retelling of the same story." Maleficent was released in 2014.

She subsequently wrote the screenplays of the sequels for both of those films—Alice Through the Looking Glass (2016) and Maleficent: Mistress of Evil (2019).

=== Other works ===
Woolverton wrote the book of the Broadway musical Lestat, an adaptation of The Vampire Chronicles by Anne Rice, which pre-debuted in 2005 in San Francisco to become the highest-earning pre-Broadway play in the city's history. The musical opened on Broadway in 2006. She co-wrote the narration script of the National Geographic theatrical documentary film Arctic Tale, released in 2007. In 2014, she announced that she was pitching a pilot for a television series.

It was later announced that Lifetime had decided to adapt the novel The Clan of the Cave Bear with Woolverton as executive-producer of the series and writer of the pilot episode. However, Lifetime decided to pass on the series when the network and the producers of Fox 21 could not agreed on an episode count.

== Themes ==
=== "Strong female characters" ===
"[A strong female character] means somebody who is proactive in their world, who affects their world, isn't a victim, even victimized by it — or if they are victimized by it, they take action to change that for themselves. They look at the world in interesting ways, maybe another way than the culture does. That makes a strong woman if she's vocal about it, or even goes about trying to make change without being vocal about it. There are so many interesting ways to describe women besides just strong, even this pure difficult strength. It's strong-willed."
— Woolverton on the "strong female character" trope.

Woolverton's works are known for their "strong female characters." She is recognized for having paved the way inside Disney for the creation of strong female protagonists, mainly due to her writing of Belle, the protagonist of Beauty and the Beast. Belle is an intelligent and strong young woman, a Disney heroine who does "something other than wait for her prince to come." Empire hailed Belle as "a feminist heroine who [is] more rounded than previous Disney characters." Woolverton herself said that Belle "moved us forward a few inches. She was a reader. She didn't rely on her beauty to get herself through the world. She wasn't a victim waiting for her prince to come. She was a proactive character."

In Alice in Wonderland, she gave the protagonist Alice Kingsleigh an adventurous, inquisitive, nonconforming personality, which leads the character to question the values of the Victorian society, and ultimately dismantle an engagement to become a world explorer. For this, Elle said: "In her version of Wonderland, she [Woolverton] gave audiences a female character that was not dependent on a man for happiness or commercial success." Describing her work in the film, Woolverton said: "My whole point in Alice was that you have to forge your own path. You can't go down anybody else's [road]. It's your dream; it's your life. You don't have to be told by other people what to make of yourself. You decide."

Reflecting on her female characters, Woolverton said: "I came up as a feminist, in my day. And when I was first approached to do Beauty and the Beast, I knew that you couldn't do a throwback Disney victim/heroine. We weren't going to buy it as women after a whole awakening in the 70s. No one is going to accept that. So that started me on a path at relooking at these Disney princesses in a sort of different way. I feel that you have to have an empowering message or you're not going to be relevant. If you don't stay relevant to how people are and how women are approaching life now, it's not going to feel true."

== Personal life ==
Woolverton is divorced from producer Lee Flicker, with whom she has a daughter, named Keaton, born in 1991. She lives in Hancock Park, Los Angeles, and had two dogs in 2014. She is represented by United Talent Agency.

== Filmography ==
=== Film writer ===
Year	Title	Director	Notes
1991	Beauty and the Beast	Gary Trousdale; Kirk Wise	
1993	Homeward Bound: The Incredible Journey	Duwayne Dunham	
1994	The Lion King	Roger Allers; Rob Minkoff	
2007	Arctic Tale	Adam Ravetch; Sarah Robertson	Narration script
2010	Alice in Wonderland	Tim Burton	
2014	Maleficent	Robert Stromberg	
2016	Alice Through the Looking Glass	James Bobin	
2019	Maleficent: Mistress of Evil	Joachim Rønning	Also executive producer

=== Theatrical productions ===
Year	Title	Notes
1994	Beauty and the Beast	Book by
1997	The Lion King	Adapted from the screenplay by
2000	Aida	Book by
2005	Lestat	Book by

=== Novels ===
Year	Title	Publisher	ISBN	Pages
1986	Star Wind	Houghton Mifflin Harcourt	978-0-3-9541454-5	192
1987	Running Before the Wind	Houghton Mifflin Harcourt	978-0-3-9542116-1	168

=== TV writer ===
Year	Title	Notes
1986	Wildfire	2 episodes
1986	Star Wars: Ewoks	2 episodes
1986	My Little Pony 'n Friends	2 episodes
1986	Dennis the Menace	65 episodes
1986	Popples	
1986–1987	The Berenstain Bears	3 episodes
1986–1987	Teen Wolf	8 episodes
1987	Garbage Pail Kids	2 episodes
1988	CBS Storybreak	1 episode
1988	The Adventures of Raggedy Ann and Andy	
1989	Chip 'n Dale Rescue Rangers	1 episode

== Awards and nominations ==
Tony Award

- Nomination for Best Book of a Musical for Beauty and the Beast (1994)

Laurence Olivier Award

- WINNER for Best New Musical for Beauty and the Beast (1998)

Newport Beach Film Festival

- WINNER for Outstanding Contribution to Screenwriting (2016)
