= Franklin R. Levy =

American film producer

Franklin R. Levy (June 20, 1948 – March 17, 1992) was an American film producer whose credits include the 1986 film Picnic and the 1993 film Homeward Bound: The Incredible Journey. He died of pulmonary embolism during the production of Homeward Bound, which was dedicated to his memory.
