= Mossad 101 =

- המדרשה
- Genre: Drama, Action
- Written by: Uri Levron; Izhar Harlev
- Directed by: Daniel Syrkin
- Starring: Yehuda Levi; Yehoram Gaon; Tzachi Halevy; Daniel Litman; Aki Avni; Itay Tiran; Hana Laszlo
- Composer: Frank Ilfman
- Country of origin: Israel
- Original language: Hebrew
- No. of seasons: 2
- No. of episodes: 25

Production
- Producers: Udi Segal; Amit Gitelzon
- Cinematography: Giora Bich
- Production company: Reshet

Original release
- Network: Channel 2
- Release: October 31, 2015 – present

Mossad 101 (Hebrew: המדרשה, romanized: HaMidrasha, lit. The Seminary) is an Israeli television action drama series that premiered on Channel 2 on October 31, 2015. The series follows a fictional training course for the Israeli intelligence agency the Mossad and focuses on the humane side of its agents and their personal experiences.

It reveals different methods to track down, sort and recruit successful agents and shows the moral difficulties of this occupation.

The series became available on Netflix on 10 October 2016.

The second season premiered on 26 October 2017, initially on Israel's Channel 2, and from November 2017 on Reshet's new standalone channel, Reshet 13.

== Plot ==
The series revolves around a secret Mossad compound called 'HaMidrasha', which is surrounded by surveillance cameras and is equipped with technological devices. The compound operates a training course in which 13 trainees are sent to complicated missions in order to test their suitability for the occupation, and their improvisation, seduction and impersonation abilities.

Yona, the commander of the course, criticizes the mediocrity of Mossad's agents and demands from the new trainees a higher level of execution. He decides to create a new training program to test his trainees via unusual and radical situations, in which, apart from excellence, Yona demands a creative "out of the box" thinking.

As individual trainees fail in different ways (physically, psychologically, ethically), they are unceremoniously dropped from the training program (and mostly from the show).

== Cast and characters ==
- Yehuda Levi as Yona Harari ("Kinder"): Commander of the course, a grounded Mossad agent
- Liron Weismann as Avigail: Supervisor and former wife of Yona, a psychologist
- Yehoram Gaon as Simon: Retired Mossad agent, was called to serve as the guide of the course
- Shai Avivi as Micha: Deputy Mossad director
- Aki Avni as Giora Hafner: Trainee of the course, a wealthy businessman
- Itay Tiran as Avishay: Trainee of the course, body language expert
- Hana Laszlo as Doris Levi: Trainee of the course
- Omer Barnea as Uri Spector: Trainee of the course, born in the United States
- Rom Barnea as Ziv Spector: Trainee of the course, born in the United States
- Soraya Torrens as Katarina Anolyo: Trainee of the course, born in Brazil
- Alex Cheqon as Max Elbaz: Trainee of the course, born in France
- Dan Shapira as Hanoch Gat: Trainee of the course, a former F-16 pilot
- Yaniv Biton as Kobi Frechdal ("The Persian"): Trainee of the course, born in Iran
- Gal Toran as Avital Vexler: Trainee of the course, an actor
- Genya Snop as Sveta Sheransky: Trainee of the course, born in Russia
- Daniel Litman as Tubi Miller (season 2)
- Tzachi Halevy as Liron Hariri (season 2)

== Episodes ==
No. overall	No. in season	Title	Directed by	Original release date
1	"1"	No One Will Get Hurt Part 1	Daniel Syrkin	31 October 2015
2	"2"	No One Will Get Hurt Part 2	Daniel Syrkin	3 November 2015
3	"3"	Cover Stories	Daniel Syrkin	10 November 2015
4	"4"	Coffee	Daniel Syrkin	17 November 2015
5	"5"	The Weinbergs	Daniel Syrkin	24 November 2015
6	"6"	The Honey Trap	Daniel Syrkin	1 December 2015
7	"7"	Rotten Apple	Daniel Syrkin	8 December 2015
8	"8"	Operation Job	Daniel Syrkin	15 December 2015
9	"9"	Good Luck Trophy	Daniel Syrkin	22 December 2015
10	"10"	Exposure	Daniel Syrkin	29 December 2015
11	"11"	The Spear	Daniel Syrkin	5 January 2016
12	"12"	Operation Bucharest	Daniel Syrkin	12 January 2016
13	"13"	Revolt of the Minions	Daniel Syrkin	19 January 2016

Season 2 (2017-2018)

Episode 1. Mr. & Mrs. X (26-10-2017) 14

Episode 2. Sarcophagus operation (02-11-2017) 15

Episode 3. Recruitment attempt (09-11-2017) 16

Episode 4. Sign from God (14-11-2017) 17

Episode 5. Fireworks (21-11-2017) 18

Episode 6. I shall come to your door (27-11-2017) 19

Episode 7. Hariri’s monkey (14-12-2017) 20

Episode 8. Trust-building measures (21-12-2017) 21

Episode 9. The messenger (24-12-2017) 22

Episode 10. Kaddish (31-12-2017) 23

Episode 11. A bent lid for a broken pot (07-01-2018) 24

Episode 12. Forgiveness is divine (18-01-2018) 25
