= Veronica Lauren =

American actress (born 1980)

- Born: December 17, 1980 (age 45); United States
- Occupation: Actress
- Years active: 1989–2010

Veronica Lauren (born December 17, 1980) is an American actress. She played Alice, the young girlfriend of Elijah Wood's character, in Forever Young (1992), and is best known for playing Hope Seaver in the 1993 film Homeward Bound: The Incredible Journey and its 1996 sequel Homeward Bound II: Lost in San Francisco. Her other film credits have included roles in The Grass Harp (1995), Charlie's Ghost Story (1995) and American Pie (film series) (1999). She also had roles on TV shows including Dark Shadows, Days of Our Lives, Home Improvement and Cold Case.
