= The Incredible Journey (film) =

1963 film by Fletcher Markle

- Re-release theatrical poster
- Directed by: Fletcher Markle
- Written by: James Algar
- Based on: The Incredible Journey by Sheila Burnford
- Produced by: James Algar; Walt Disney
- Starring: Émile Genest; John Drainie; Tommy Tweed; Sandra Scott
- Narrated by: Rex Allen
- Cinematography: Kenneth Peach
- Edited by: Norman R. Palmer
- Music by: Oliver Wallace
- Production company: Walt Disney Productions
- Distributed by: Buena Vista Distribution
- Release date: November 20, 1963
- Running time: 80 min.
- Countries: United States; Canada
- Language: English
- Box office: $4.2 million (US/Canada) (rentals)

The Incredible Journey is a 1963 adventure film directed by Fletcher Markle and produced by Walt Disney Productions. Based on the 1961 novel of the same name by Scottish writer Sheila Burnford, the film follows the adventure of Luath the Labrador Retriever, Bodger the Bull Terrier, and Tao the Siamese cat as they journey 300 miles (480 km) through the Canadian wilderness to return to their home. The film's human cast consists of Émile Genest, John Drainie, Tommy Tweed, and Sandra Scott, with Rex Allen providing narration.

Released on November 20, 1963 by Buena Vista Distribution, the film received $4.2 million in overall rentals. It was the final film to be scored by longtime Disney composer Oliver Wallace, who died two months prior to its release.

== Plot ==
One night, deep in the forests of Ontario, bachelor John Longridge plans a long hunting trip. His housekeeper Mrs. Oakes is coming the next day, so he leaves her a note, including how he plans to let the three animals staying with him – Tao the Siamese cat, Luath the Yellow Labrador, and Bodger the elderly English Bull Terrier – out for a morning run. He retires to bed, and reflects on how his friend John Hunter (Luath's owner, who lives nearly 200 miles away) received an offer for a visiting fellowship at the University of Oxford. Tao and Bodger belong to Hunter's children Elizabeth and Peter, respectively, and Longridge offered to take in all three pets while the family was away. Tao, meanwhile, accidentally knocks the crucial half of the note into the fireplace, destroying it.

The next day, Longridge lets the animals into his yard for a run, and departs. Before Mrs. Oakes can arrive, Luath hears wild geese migrating home, and decides he wants to go home, too. He leaves the yard, and the other two follow. They intend to travel due west until they get there, not knowing how far it is. Mrs. Oakes and her husband Bert arrive, and assume that Longridge has taken the animals with him.

The animals soon realize Bodger, due to his age, is a liability. Having no means of getting food from humans without getting caught, they continue to forge ahead, but Bodger eventually collapses. Tao goes off to hunt some birds, and Luath goes off in search of water. Two American black bear cubs discover Bodger, but he does not respond to their play, so they decide to wrestle each other. The mother bear comes running at the noise, thinks Bodger has hurt her cubs, and tries to attack. Tao and Luath return and drive off the bear, and Bodger eats a bobwhite that Tao has killed for him, regaining his strength.

The animals travel on, hunting as they go. They pass through the yard of a sawmill, where Bodger attempts to raid the cookhouse trash can, only to be shot at by the cook. Luath catches a rabbit, but Bodger and Tao discover an eccentric old hermit, Jeremy, who tries to serve them food, but then distractedly eats it all himself. Later still, the two dogs swim across a river while Tao leaps across an opening in a beaver dam. He falls short and the dam gives way. Tao is washed downstream where he is rescued by a Finnish girl named Helvi. After she nurses him back to health with her parents' help, he departs one night to catch up with the dogs. Along the way he takes shelter from a thunderstorm and narrowly avoids being eaten by a lynx. Luckily, a young hunter appears from the trees and chases away the lynx.

Shortly after being reunited, the animals encounter a porcupine, which quills Luath in the face. Seeking cool water to alleviate the burning, Luath is found by hunter James Mackenzie. He takes Luath to his farm, where Bodger has already arrived and made friends with Mackenzie's wife, Nell. Luath is treated, both dogs are fed and then locked in the barn for the night. Meanwhile, Longridge returns home, and he and Mrs. Oakes quickly piece together the truth. Longridge starts calling all the ranger stations and outposts for help, and news of sightings comes in from all over. Tao manages to free the dogs, and the trio wander into the harsh Ironmouth Mountains, where there will be no more help from humans, and a harsh wintery climate.

The Hunters return home to the sad news that Mackenzie was the last to see the animals. Elizabeth refuses to believe Tao won't make it back, but Peter accepts that elderly Bodger probably won't survive, and the parents agree. They decide to celebrate Peter's birthday to take their minds off the situation. During the celebration in the yard, Elizabeth hears a dog barking in the distance and believes it's Luath. Peter then asks his father to call for him. Luath appears, followed by Tao, joyfully reuniting with the family. Peter mourns for Bodger, who is not there, but then notices the old dog slowly approaching, far behind the others. Peter runs to meet him while the other two animals return to Bodger's side, all completing their incredible journey.

== Cast ==
- Emile Genest as John Longridge
- John Drainie as Professor James Hunter
- Sandra Scott as Nancy Hunter
- Marion Finlayson as Elizabeth Hunter
- Ronald Cohoon as Peter Hunter
- Tommy Tweed as The Hermit
- Robert Christie as James MacKenzie
- Beth Lockerbie as Nell MacKenzie
- Beth Amos as Mrs. Oakes
- Eric Clavering as Bert Oakes
- Jan Rubeš as Carl Nurmi
- Syme Jago as Helvi Nurmi
- Muffy the Bull Terrier as Bodger
- Rink the Labrador Retriever as Luath
- Syn Cat the Siamese cat as Tao
- Rex Allen as The Narrator

== Production ==
Before filming, producer Jack Couffer visited Burnford in Port Arthur, Ontario to photograph the surrounding countryside which he used to pinpoint a filming location that fit the area as close as possible. This was necessary as the season in Ontario was too short to schedule the necessary filming.

There were three animal handlers; Hal Driscoll looked after the Labrador, Bill Koehler the Bull Terrier, and Al Niemela the cat.

Burnford spent seven days with the film crew, including one session where they filmed the Siamese cat "fishing in a creek, and landing its flapping catch with a lightningswift professional paw" as often as the director wished.

== Remake ==
In 1993, Disney made a new version of the film, entitled Homeward Bound: The Incredible Journey featuring the voices of Don Ameche, Sally Field, and Michael J. Fox in the roles of the animals. Unlike the original, the film keeps the same basic story line, but adds a subplot in which the kids are dealing with a new stepfather. All three pets are renamed, the breeds of the dogs are changed, the cat is changed from male to female, and the ages of the original Labrador/Golden Retriever and Bull Terrier/American Bull Dog are switched. It also has vocalizations of the animals' thoughts and communications with each other.

Unlike the original story, the wilderness through which the three animals journey is in the Sierra Nevada mountains, not the forest of Ontario.

The film was also followed by a sequel in 1996, entitled Homeward Bound II: Lost in San Francisco.
