= Amazing Journey (disambiguation) =

"Amazing Journey" is a 1969 song by The Who

Amazing Journey may also refer to:

- Amazing Journey: The Story of The Who, a 2007 documentary about The Who
  - Amazing Journey: The Story of The Who (soundtrack), the soundtrack to the documentary, released in 2008
- Amazing Journey (Baptist Youth), the Association of Baptist Churches in Ireland
