= Kim Greist =

American actress

- Born: May 12, 1958 (age 68); Stamford, Connecticut, U.S.
- Occupation: Actress
- Years active: 1983–2001

Kim Greist (born May 12, 1958) is a retired American actress and model. Her credits include C.H.U.D. (1984), Miami Vice (1985), Brazil (1985), Manhunter (1986), Throw Momma from the Train (1987), Punchline (1988), Homeward Bound: The Incredible Journey (1993), Roswell (1994) Houseguest (1995), and Judging Amy (2001).

== Career ==
Greist trained for the stage and spent some of her late teenage years as a professional model in Europe. She then returned to the United States at age 20 and launched her acting career in the off-Broadway comedy Second Prize: Two Months in Leningrad in 1983.

Her later stage credits included appearances in the New York Shakespeare Festival.

Greist's first film appearance was in the horror film C.H.U.D. (1984). In 1985, she made a guest appearance in the 1985 Miami Vice episode "Nobody Lives Forever" (S01E21), and also starred alongside Robert De Niro, Jonathan Pryce, and Ian Holm in the Terry Gilliam film Brazil (1985).

Other films in which she appeared during the 1980s included Michael Mann's Manhunter (1986), Throw Momma from the Train (1987), and Punchline (1988). She continued to appear in films and television into the 1990s, with roles in Homeward Bound: The Incredible Journey (1993) and Roswell (1994). She played Emily Young opposite comedians Sinbad and Phil Hartman in the film Houseguest (1995).

In 2001, her last acting role was in an episode of Judging Amy called "The Last Word". Greist resided as of 2012 in her hometown of Stamford, Connecticut.

== Filmography ==
=== Film ===
Year	Title	Role	Notes
1984	C.H.U.D.	Lauren Daniels	
1985	Brazil	Jill Layton	
1986	Manhunter	Molly Graham	
1987	Throw Momma from the Train	Beth Ryan	
1988	Punchline	Madeline Urie	
1990	Why Me?	June Daley	
1993	Homeward Bound: The Incredible Journey	Laura Burnford-Seaver	
1995	Houseguest	Emily Young	
1996	Homeward Bound II: Lost in San Francisco	Laura Seaver	
1998	The Rose Sisters		
1999	Rockin' Good Times	Samantha	Short
2000	The Hiding Place	Holly	
2001	Zoe	Mrs. Callahan	

=== Television ===
Year	Title	Role	Notes
1985	Miami Vice	Brenda	Episode: "Nobody Lives Forever"
1988	Tales from the Darkside	Claire	Episode: "Going Native"
1989	Wiseguy	Kay Gallagher	4 episodes
1990	Monsters	Sarah / Mandy	Episode: "The Bargain"
1991	Payoff	Justine Bates	TV film
1992	Duplicates	Marion Boxletter	TV film
1994	Roswell	Vy Marcel	TV film
1994–95	Chicago Hope	Laurie Geiger	7 episodes
1996	Last Exit to Earth	Eve	TV film
1999	H-E Double Hockey Sticks	Marie Antoinette	TV film
2000	Touched by an Angel	Shawn Sullivan	Episode: "With God as My Witness"
2000	Diagnosis: Murder	Lou Tyler, P.I.	Episode: "The Unluckiest Bachelor in L.A."
2000	Shriek If You Know What I Did Last Friday the 13th	Mrs. Peacock	TV film
2000	The X-Files	Lisa Underwood	Episode: "Invocation"
2001	Judging Amy	Michelle Crouse	Episode: "The Last Word"
