= American Bulldog =

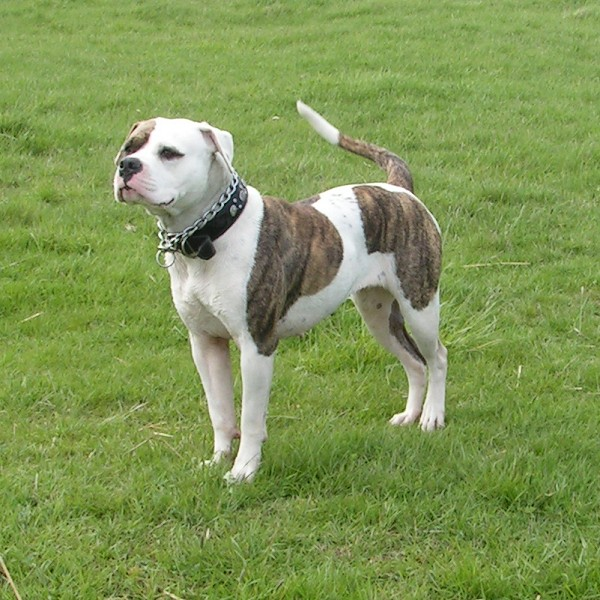
- American Bulldog
- Other names: Southern White; White English; Old Southern White Bulldog; Hill Bulldog; Country Bulldog; English White Bulldog
- Origin: United States
Traits
Height	Males	50–65 cm (20–26 in)
	Females	51–61 cm (20–24 in)
Weight	Males	34–52 kg (75–115 lb)
	Females	27–41 kg (60–90 lb)
- Coat: Short, harsh
- Color: All white or white with patches of red or varying degrees of brown, brindle, or fawn.
Kennel club standards
- UKC: standard

The American Bulldog is a large, muscular breed of mastiff-type dog. Their ancestors were brought to the British North American colonies where they worked on small farms and ranches.

== History ==
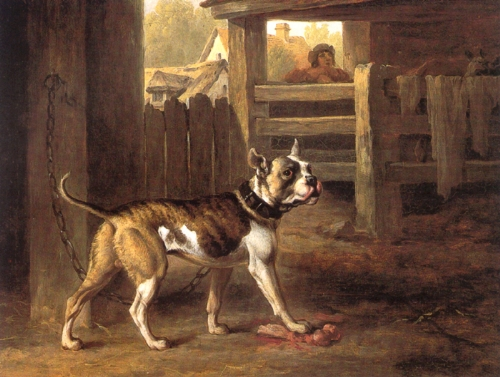
Old English Bulldog by Philip Reinagle, 1790

The American Bulldog, like the English Bulldog, descends from the Old English Bulldog. Dog breeds defined to any standard only came into being with the rise of kennel clubs and breed registries. This happened in the United States in 1884. Before this, no records were kept and instead of breeds, there were informal landrace strains that initially depended on where a dog's parent or master originated.

Dogs resembling bulldogs in England were first mentioned by the ancient Romans as "pugnaces Britanniae." The vocabulary used to describe dogs has changed over time, but these are believed to be the ancestors of the alaunt and the later bulldog. Dogs had been used since the 13th century in bull-baiting, but the first known mention of bulldogs by name is not found until a seventeenth-century letter requesting them to be sent from London to St. Sebastian, Spain. Different strains of English bulldogs were developed for cattle-droving, bull-baiting, farm dogs, and butcher's dogs. They found their way to the North American British colonies as working dogs, where smaller farm and ranch owners used them for many tasks, including farm guardians, stock dogs, and catch dogs. Cynographia Britannica defined the physical and behavioral characteristics of the bulldog in print in 1800. In 1835, bull-baiting was banned in the United Kingdom and breeders there minimized the aggressive, athletic traits of the breed. This ban was not in effect in the United States; however bull-baiting lost popularity as a form of entertainment, contributing to the rarity of the dogs.

Breeding decisions for the majority of these American dogs were based on temperament and work abilities as farm dogs instead of bloodline. Eventually, several separate dog strains of the bulldog-type were kept by ranchers as utilitarian dogs working to catch cattle and kill predatory wildlife that threatened farm property. Following World War II, this type of dog was on the verge of extinction. The few surviving dogs were kept primarily on farms in the southeastern US. John D. Johnson and Alan Scott are widely regarded as rescuing the landrace from extinction. Johnson scoured the backroads of the South, looking for the best specimens to revive it. During this time, the young Alan Scott became interested in Johnson's dogs and began to work with him on his revitalization project. At some point, Scott began breeding bulldogs from working Southern farms with Johnson's lines, creating what is now known as the Standard or Scott-type American Bulldog. At another point, Johnson began crossing his original lines with an English bulldog from the northern UK that had maintained its pre-ban genetic athletic vigor, creating the Bully type American Bulldog, also known as the Johnson type or the Classic type. On January 1, 1999, the United Kennel Club first recognized the American Bulldog as a breed. In November 2019, the breed was added to the American Kennel Club (AKC) Foundation Stock Service (FSS).

The American Bully is an entirely separate breed that evolved from the American Pitbull Terrier mixed with the American Bulldog, English Bulldog, and Olde English Bulldogge. The United Kennel Club recognized it as such on July 15, 2013.

== Appearance ==
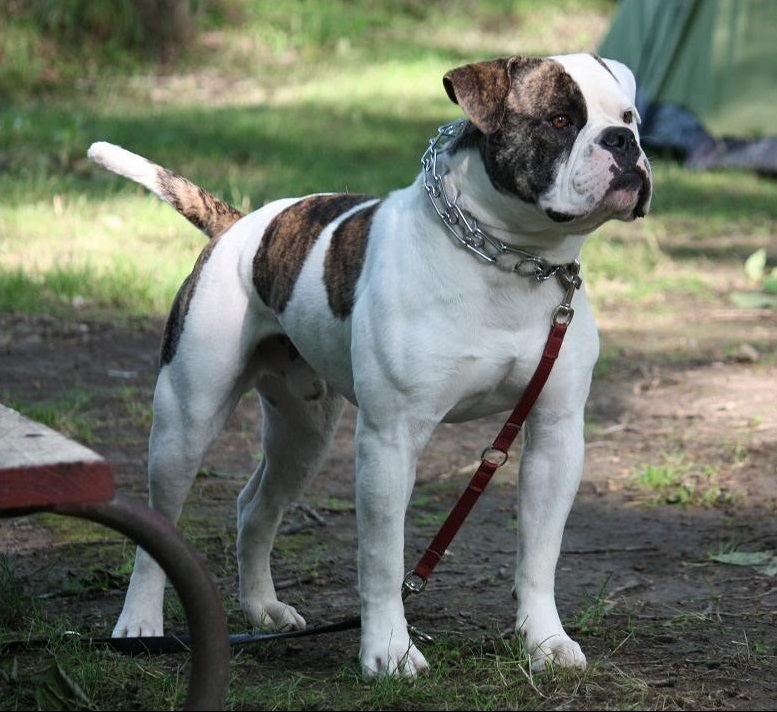
An American Bulldog; the typical mandibular prognathism is evident

The American Bulldog is a stocky and heavily built dog with a large head and a muscular shoulders and forearms. Its coat is short and generally smooth, requiring little maintenance except a bath every few weeks. The breed is a light-to-moderate shedder. Colors, while historically predominantly white with patches of red, black, or brindle, have grown in recent years to include many color patterns, including black, red, brown, fawn, and all shades of brindle. Black pigmentation on the nose and eye rims is traditionally preferred, with only some pink allowed. Eye color is usually brown, but heterochromia also occurs, although this is also considered a cosmetic fault. American Bulldogs are known to drool more than other breeds of dogs. The Bully type is generally a larger, heavier dog with a shorter muzzle, but the muzzle should never be so short that it causes difficulty with breathing. Standard types are generally more athletic, with longer muzzles and a more square head. Many modern American Bulldogs are a combination of the two types, usually termed "hybrid". In general, American Bulldogs weigh between 27–54 kilograms (60–119 lb) and are 52–70 centimetres (20–28 in) at the withers, but have been known to greatly exceed these dimensions, especially in the "out of standard" nonworking stock.

== Health ==
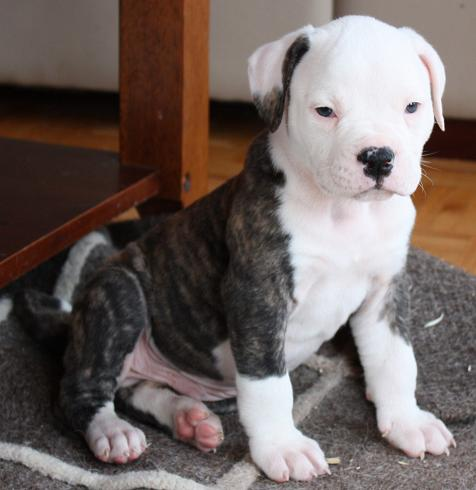
A six-week-old male American Bulldog puppy

Neuronal ceroid lipofuscinosis (NCL) has been identified in some American Bulldogs.

The American Bulldog is predisposed to the following dermatological conditions: allergic skin disease, ichthyosis, solar dermatosis, and squamous cell carcinoma.

A review of patient records in the US from over 600 hospitals found the American Bulldog to be predisposed to juvenile-onset demodicosis with a 3.4 odds ratio.

== In popular culture ==
- In Tucker & Dale vs. Evil (2010), Jangers, Tyler Labine's character's dog, is played by an American Bulldog named Weezer.
- An American Bulldog features prominently as the titular character's companion in the 2013 film Joe.
- The company logo for Zynga features the silhouette of an American Bulldog; the company was named after founder Mark Pincus’ dog "Zinga".
- Chance, from the feature film Homeward Bound: The Incredible Journey (1993) and Homeward Bound II: Lost in San Francisco (1996).

== Gallery ==
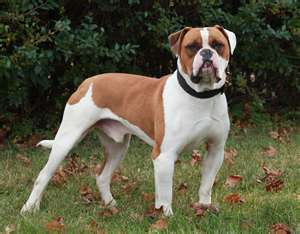

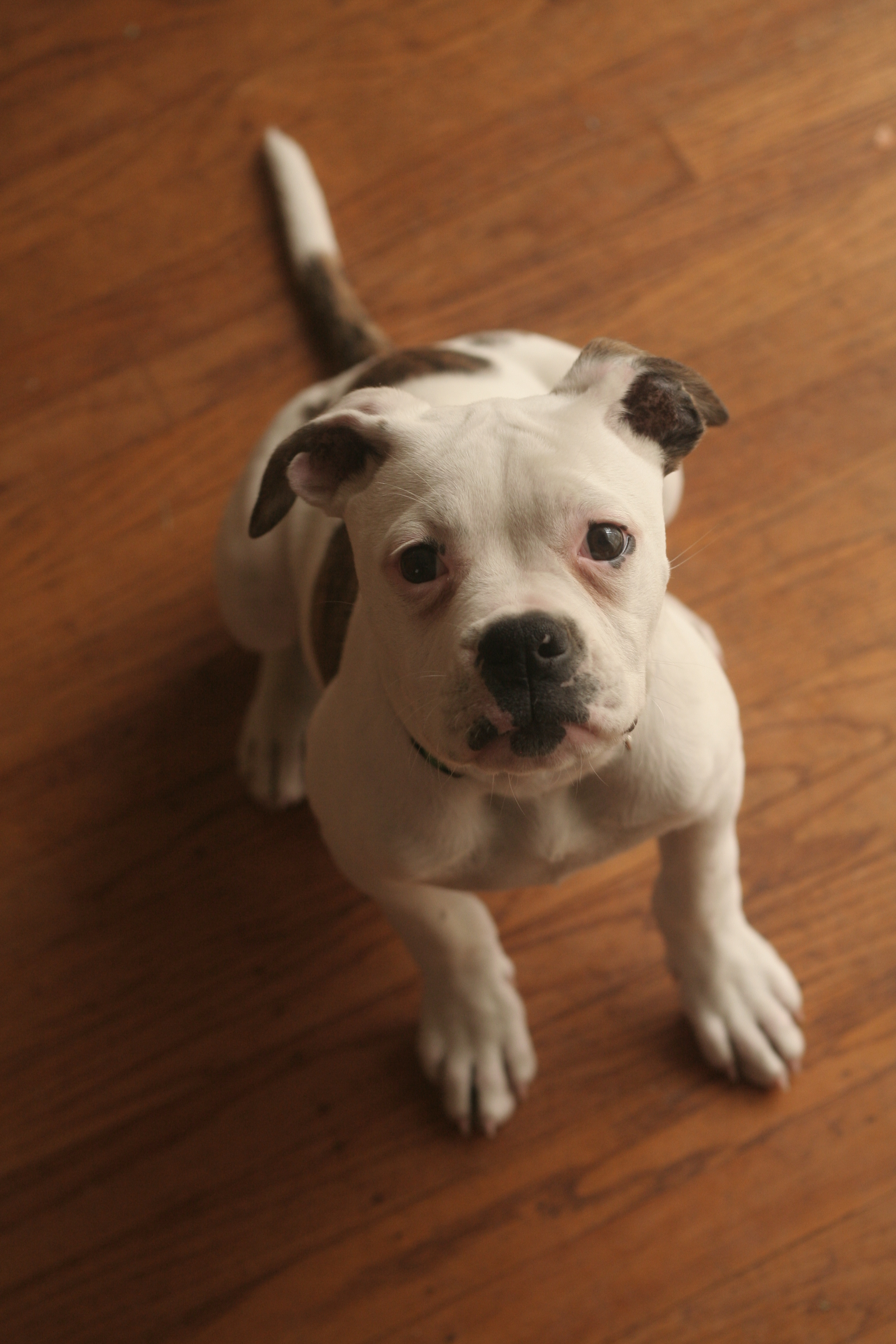

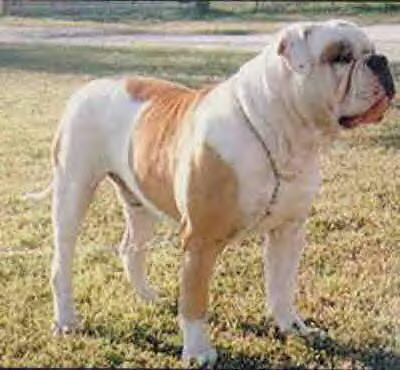

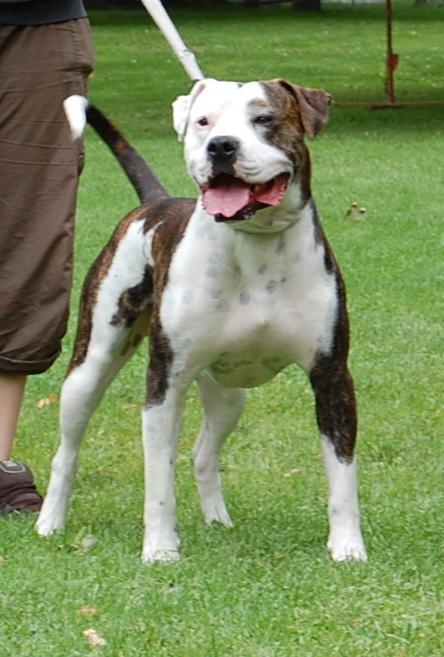

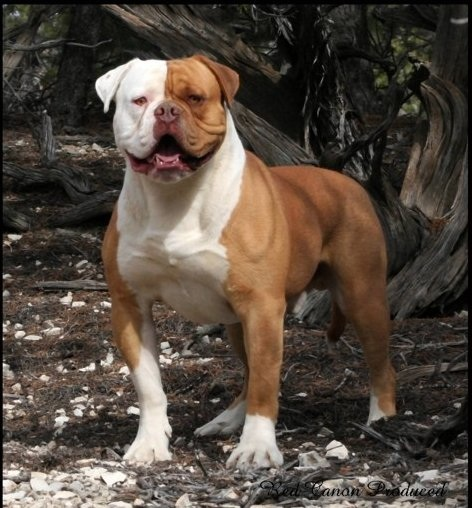

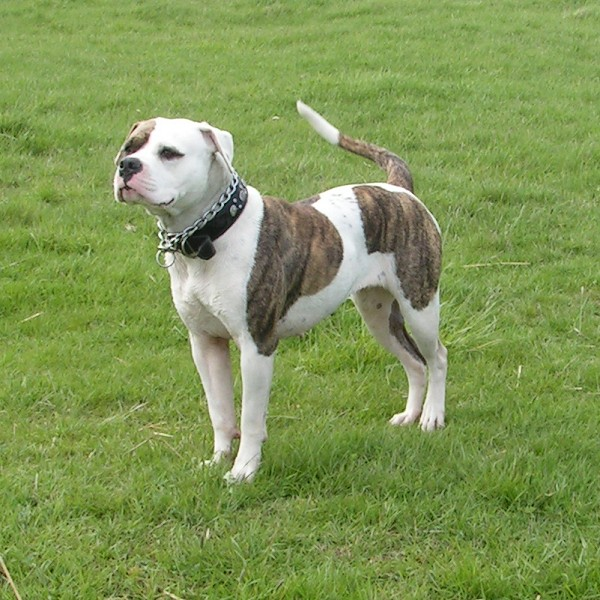

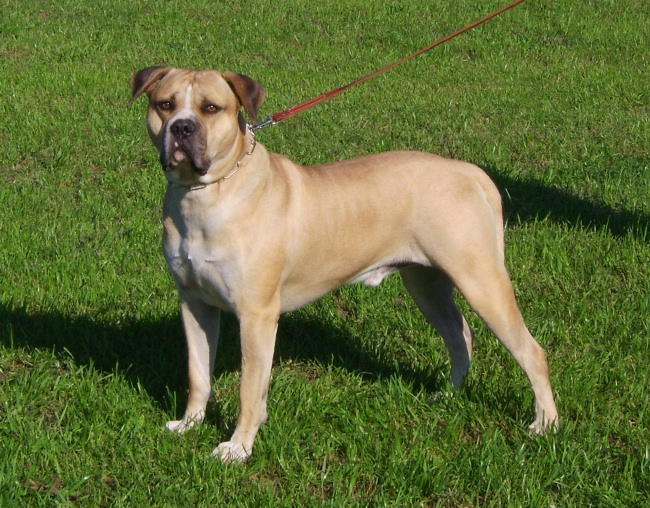

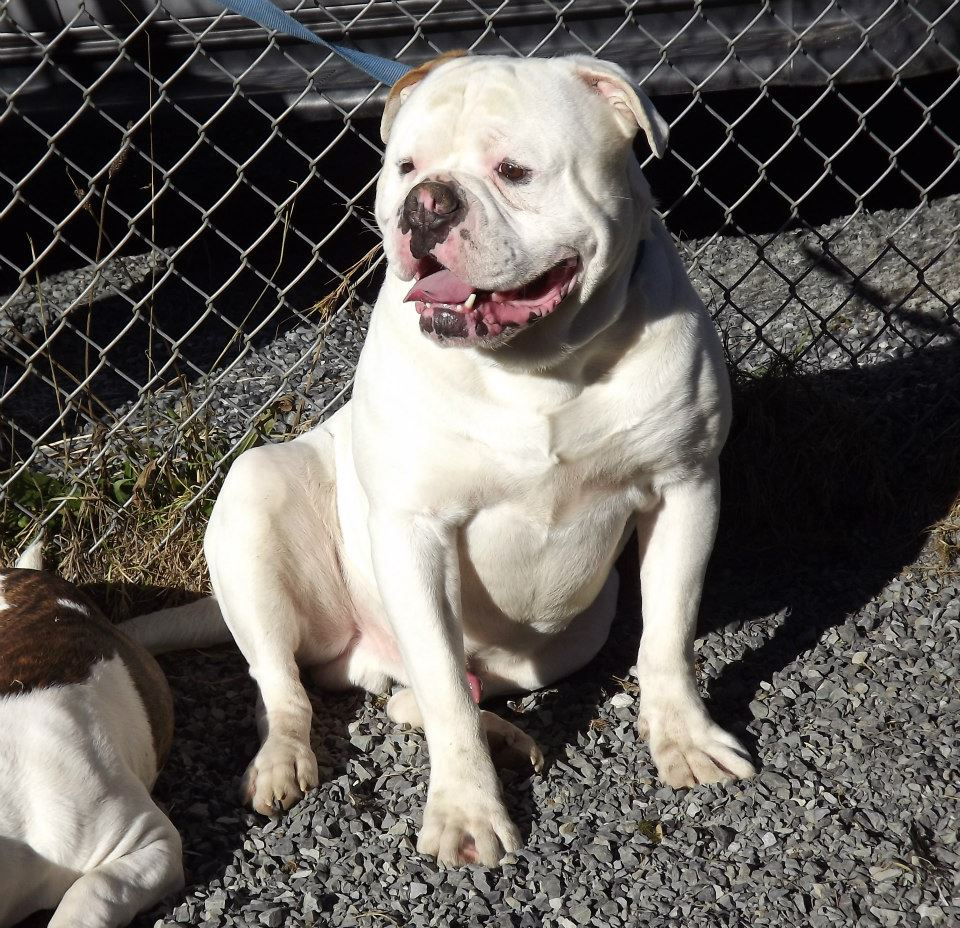

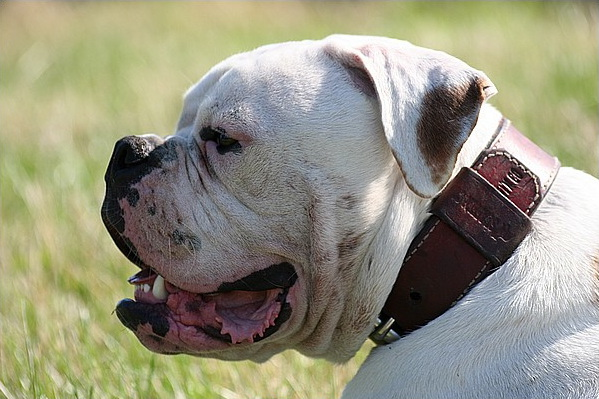

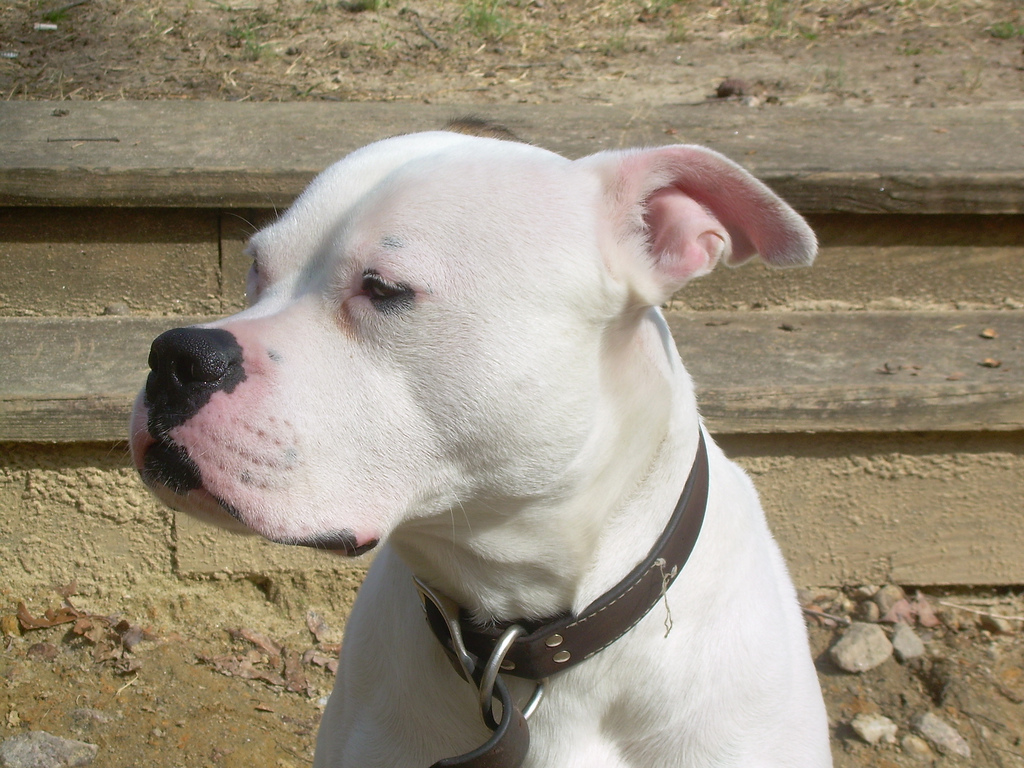

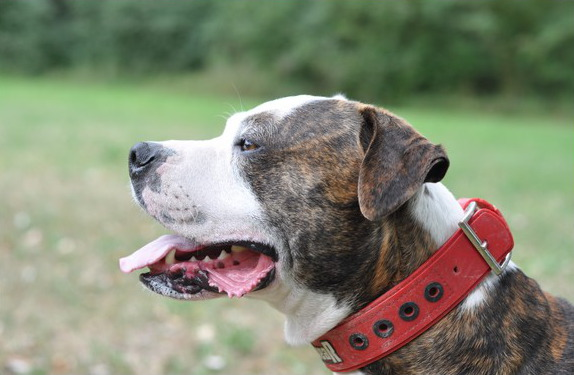

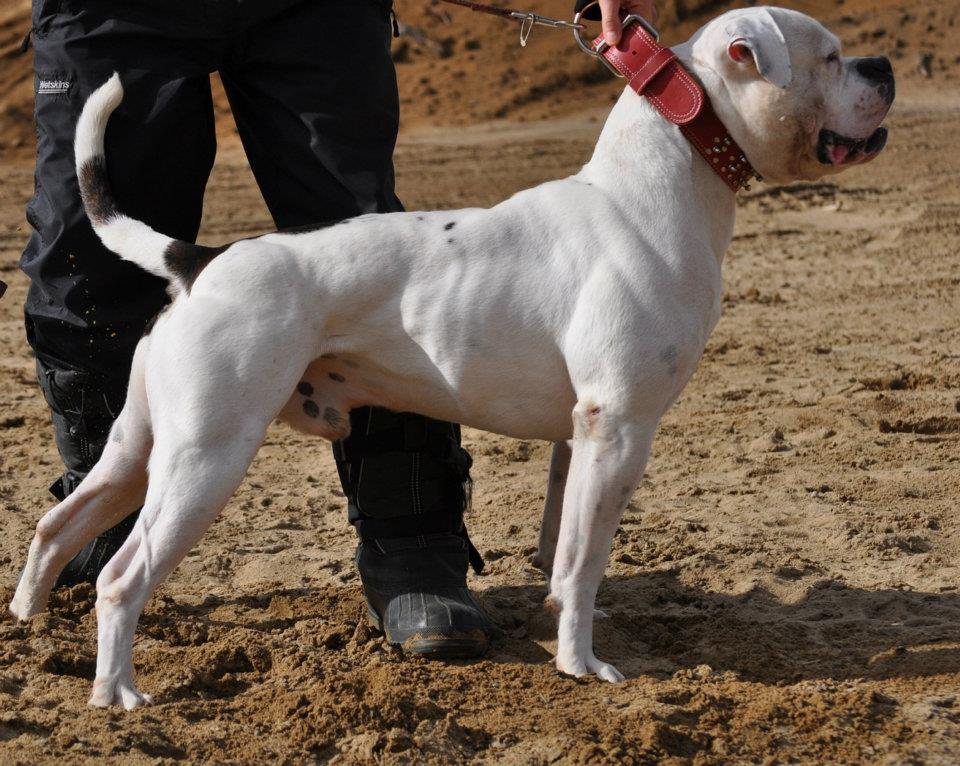

== See also ==
- List of dog breeds
- American Bulldog Association
- American Bully
- Bulldog type
- Molossus
