= Homeward Bound: The Incredible Journey =

1993 film by Duwayne Dunham

- Theatrical release poster
- Directed by: Duwayne Dunham
- Screenplay by: Caroline Thompson; Linda Woolverton; Jonathan Roberts (uncredited)
- Based on: The Incredible Journey by Sheila Burnford
- Produced by: Jeffrey Chernov; Franklin R. Levy
- Starring: Robert Hays; Kim Greist; Veronica Lauren; Kevin Chevalia; Benj Thall
- Cinematography: Reed Smoot
- Edited by: Jonathan P. Shaw
- Music by: Bruce Broughton
- Production company: Walt Disney Pictures
- Distributed by: Buena Vista Pictures Distribution
- Release date: February 3, 1993
- Running time: 84 minutes
- Country: United States
- Language: English
- Box office: $57 million

Homeward Bound: The Incredible Journey is a 1993 American adventure comedy film and a remake of the 1963 film The Incredible Journey, which was based on the 1961 novel of the same name by Sheila Burnford. Directed by Duwayne Dunham in his feature film directorial debut and including the voice talents of Michael J. Fox, Sally Field and Don Ameche, it was released on February 3, 1993. It grossed $57 million worldwide and was followed in 1996 by the sequel Homeward Bound II: Lost in San Francisco. This film is dedicated to producer Franklin R. Levy, who died during production, and Ben Ami Agmon, and it also marked the final film released in Don Ameche's lifetime.

== Plot ==
Chance, an immature American Bulldog and the narrator of the film, explains that he is the pet of Jamie Burnford, but expresses no desire in his owner or being part of a family. He shares his home with Shadow, a wise old Golden Retriever owned by Jamie's brother Peter, and Sassy, a pampered Himalayan cat owned by Peter and Jamie's sister Hope. That morning, the children's mother, Laura Burnford, marries Bob Seaver, and Chance causes trouble by devouring the wedding cake in front of all the guests.

Shortly after the wedding, the family has to temporarily move to San Francisco because Bob must relocate there for his job. They leave the pets at a ranch belonging to Kate, Laura's college friend. Shadow and Sassy miss their owners immediately, but Chance sees it as an opportunity to relax and be free. Later in the week, Kate goes on a cattle drive, leaving the animals to be looked after by her neighbor Frank. However, half of her message to him is lost, leading him to believe that she has taken them along, leaving the animals alone. Unsure about the disappearance of their host, the animals fear they have been abandoned. Shadow, refusing to think that his boy would abandon him, decides to make his way home. Not wanting to be left alone on the ranch, Chance and Sassy decide to accompany Shadow on his journey.

They head into the rocky, mountainous wilderness of the Sierra Nevada with Shadow leading. After a night spent in fear of the woodland noises, the group stops to catch breakfast at a river. However, two black bear cubs interrupt Chance and a large brown bear causes the group to retreat. At another river, Sassy refuses to swim across to follow the dogs and instead tries to cross via a wooden path further downstream. Halfway across, the wood breaks and she falls into the river. Shadow tries to save her, but she goes over a waterfall to her apparent death. Guilt-ridden, Shadow and Chance go on without her. Unknown to them, Sassy survives and is later found on the riverbank by an old man named Quentin, who nurses her back to health.

Over the next two days, Shadow and Chance unsuccessfully attempt to catch food and encounter a mountain lion, which chases them to the edge of a cliff. Shadow gets an idea to use rocks positioned like a seesaw as a way to outsmart the mountain lion. While Shadow acts as bait, Chance pounces onto the end of the rock and sends the mountain lion over the cliff and into a river. Sassy hears the dogs barking in celebration and follows the sound to rejoin them.

Meanwhile, Kate returns home to her farm; Frank confronts her about the note she left him, and she tells him that she did not bring the animals. She contacts a forest ranger and then informs Bob that the animals are lost in the woods. The family grieves their loss, and Peter quarrels with his stepfather over whether or not they should search for them, believing that Bob wanted him to abandon Shadow. Peter unsuccessfully tries to enlist the help of the police, while their quarrel inspires Bob to send flyers to park rangers in hopes of relocating the animals.

The animals continue on their way, but Chance begins harassing a porcupine and ends up with several quills in his cheek. They then encounter a missing little girl named Molly, and following their loyalty instincts they stand guard over her during the night. In the morning, Shadow finds a rescue party and leads them back to the girl. Two forest rangers recognize them from one of the flyers, and take them to the local animal shelter, where the medical staff remove the quills from Chance's cheek. However, believing it to be an animal pound, the trio panic and Sassy escapes, later returning to free Shadow. Together, they retrieve Chance and escape the shelter, unaware that their owners are on their way to reclaim them.

Finally reaching their hometown, the animals cross through a train yard, where Shadow falls into a muddy pit and injures his leg. He despondently tells the others to continue without him, but a heartbroken Chance insists he will not let the older dog give up. Near dusk, Chance and Sassy finally make it home and are happily reunited with their owners. Shadow eventually limps into view behind them, rejuvenated by his reunion with Peter. The film ends with Chance musing about the lessons he learned, and his new appreciation for his family, before happily running into the house at the smell of food.

== Cast ==
- Robert Hays as Bob Seaver
- Kim Greist as Laura Burnford-Seaver
- Jean Smart as Kate
- Veronica Lauren as Hope Burnford-Seaver
- Kevin Chevalia as Jamie Burnford-Seaver
- Benj Thall as Peter Burnford-Seaver
- William Edward Phipps as Quentin
- Mark L. Taylor as Kirkwood
- Ed Bernard as Desk Sergeant
- Gary Taylor as Frank
- Bart the Bear as Bear
- David MacIntyre as Foote
- Caroll Spinney as Dog in Pound
- Rattler as Chance
  - Michael J. Fox as the voice of Chance
- Tiki as Sassy
  - Sally Field as the voice of Sassy
- Ben as Shadow
  - Don Ameche as the voice of Shadow

== Production ==
Filming took place in Oregon in spring 1991. Downtown Portland was used for urban shots in San Francisco and additional scenes were filmed in Joseph, Oregon. The scenes set in the Sierra Nevada mountains were filmed at the Eagle Cap Wilderness area.

The film makes extensive use of animal actors. American Humane certified the film as not harming animals. Animals were mostly filmed separately to prevent conflict, and scenes were then cut together to create the illusion of the animals interacting. Stand-in animals were also used for the main characters, with 10 cats playing the role of Sassy.

== Reception ==
The film received positive reception. The film holds an 87% aggregate critic approval rating at Rotten Tomatoes based on 30 reviews, with the consensus stating "Disney's remake of The Incredible Journey successfully replicates, and in some ways improves upon, the simple charms of the original, with its cross-country animal odyssey sure to delight kids." According to movie critic Roger Ebert, the movie is "frankly designed for kids, and yet it has a certain craftsmanship and an undeniable charm, and if you find yourself watching it with a child you may end up liking it almost as much." Audiences polled by CinemaScore gave the film a rare grade of "A+" on an A+ to F scale.

The film grossed $41.8 million in the United States and Canada and $15.5 million internationally for a worldwide total of $57.4 million.
