= Sheila Burnford =

Scottish writer (1916–1984)

- Born: 11 May 1916; Edinburgh, Scotland
- Died: 20 April 1984 (aged 67); Hampshire, England
- Education: St. George's School, Edinburgh & Harrogate Ladies College
- Occupation: Writer
- Spouse: David Burnford (m. 1941)
- Children: 3

Sheila Philip Cochrane Burnford née Every (11 May 1916 – 20 April 1984) was a Scottish writer. She is best known for her novel The Incredible Journey about two dogs and a cat traveling through the Canadian wilderness.

== Life and work ==
Burnford was born in Edinburgh, Scotland and lived in Ayrshire during her teenage years. She attended St. George's School, Edinburgh, and Harrogate Ladies College. She also attended schools in France and Germany. In 1941 she married Dr. David Burnford, with whom she had three children. During World War II, Burnford worked as a volunteer ambulance driver. In 1951 she emigrated to Canada, settling in Port Arthur, Ontario.

Burnford is best remembered for The Incredible Journey, published by Hodder & Stoughton with illustrations by Carl Burger in 1960. The story of three animal pets traveling in the wilderness won the Canadian Library Association Book of the Year for Children Award in 1963 and the ALA Aurianne Award in 1963 as the best book on animal life written for children ages 8–14. It is marketed for children, but Burnford has stated that it was not intended as a children's book. It was a modest success commercially and became a bestseller after release of the 1963 Disney film, The Incredible Journey (which was remade in 1993 as Homeward Bound: The Incredible Journey). Another book, Bel Ria, about a dog's survival in wartime, was based on her own experiences as an ambulance driver.

Burnford later wrote other books on Canadian topics, including One Woman's Arctic (1973) about her two summers in Pond Inlet, Nunavut on Baffin Island with Susan Ross. She traveled by komatik, a traditional Inuit dog sled, assisted in archaeological excavation, having to thaw the land inch by inch, ate everything offered to her, and saw the migration of the narwhals.

Burnford died of cancer in the village of Buckler's Hard in Hampshire at the age of 67.

== Works ==
- The Incredible Journey, illustrated by Carl Burger (Toronto and London: Hodder & Stoughton; Boston: Little, Brown, 1961); also published as Homeward Bound: The Incredible Journey or Homeward Bound
- The Fields of Noon (1964)
- Without Reserve: Among the Northern Forest Indians (1969), illus. Susan Ross
- One Woman's Arctic (Hodder & Stoughton, 1972)
- Mr. Noah and the Second Flood, illus. Michael Foreman (1973)
- Bel Ria (1977); also published as Bel Ria: Dog of War

Library of Congress and WorldCat library records do not clearly show any other works published as books (six, as of 2018). WorldCat records show four of Burnford's books published in the US as Atlantic Monthly Press books, then an imprint of Little, Brown.
