= The Incredible Journey =

1961 children's book by Sheila Burnford

First edition (UK)

The Incredible Journey (1961), by Scottish author Sheila Burnford, is a children's book first published by Hodder & Stoughton, which tells the story of three pets as they travel 300 miles (480 km) through the Canadian wilderness searching for their beloved masters. It depicts the suffering and stress of an arduous journey, together with the unwavering loyalty and courage of the three animals. The story is set in the northwestern part of Ontario, which has many lakes, rivers, and widely dispersed small farms and towns.

It is usually considered a children's book, although Burnford has stated that she did not write it specifically for children. The book was a modest success when first published, but became widely known after 1963 when it was loosely adapted into a film by the same name by Walt Disney. The story was again adapted loosely when Disney remade the film in 1993 as Homeward Bound: The Incredible Journey.

Burnford based the fictional story on the animals she and her husband owned while living in Canada: a Bull Terrier brought from England; a Siamese cat, whose mutual relationship with the terrier she described as "closer than any other cat-and-dog relationship I had ever seen"; and a young Labrador Retriever, who also developed a close relationship with the older dog.

== Plot ==
The animals' owners, the Hunters, leave to go to England for several months because Jim, the father, is scheduled to give a series of university lectures there. They leave their pets in the care of John Longridge, a family friend and godfather of their daughter, Elizabeth. One day, after John Longridge leaves for a two-week duck hunting trip, the animals, feeling the lack of their human helpers, set out to try to find their owners, the Hunters. Mrs. Oakes, who is taking care of Longridge's home, does not find the animals and thinks that John must have taken them with him. The animals follow their instincts and head west, towards home, 300 miles away through the Canadian wilderness. They face many obstacles in their path; from rivers to irritable people, but nonetheless, they struggle bravely on, until they finally reach home.

=== Characters ===
- Luath: Luath is a young Labrador Retriever. His fur is golden red, his eyes are brown, and he is strongly built. Of the Hunters' three pets, he is the most recent addition. He is also the most determined to push forward and reach home and the Hunters. Luath usually walks on Bodger's left side.
- Bodger: Bodger (whose full name is Champion Borough Castle Brigadier of Doune) is an old English Bull Terrier. His fur is white with a slight pinkish tint. Bodger's left eye is nearly blind. The dog was born to fight and endure (as he does in the book). Because he is eleven years old, Bodger tires easily, but he is a brave, loyal, persevering, and tenacious companion. He is very fond of humans, particularly children, and whenever the group comes across humans in their travels, he tries to charm them for affection and snacks, with varying results. He has an intense hostility towards all cats save Tao, who earned his respect by standing up to him when Tao first joined the Hunter family as a small kitten. Though they care deeply for Luath, Bodger and Tao have a special bond. Bodger is the first of the animals to have joined the Hunter family. Despite his advanced age and diminished senses, Bodger is still every bit the fighter he was in his prime, at one point saving Luath from a Border Collie sicced on them by an irate farmer.
- Tao: Tao is a slender, seal-point, old-style Siamese cat with sapphire eyes. Tao has a royal white body with dark black features such as his face, feet, and tail. An element of humor in the book is that Tao, like Bodger, despises other cats, and the two once shared many adventures terrorizing the other felines in their neighborhood; when they encounter other domesticated cats in their travels, Tao often fights them, successfully. Tao is able to open most doors, a help to the dogs in several situations. Tao is a tireless, bold, and loyal animal. Tao is probably the best equipped of the three to survive in the wilderness, and has no difficulty surviving on his own when separated from the two dogs; despite this, he spends all his time seeking to rejoin them, a testament to the bond between the animals. The cat is an independent and natural hunter, catching small birds for the group. When Tao is separated from them, the dogs fare more poorly without Tao than Tao does without them. Therefore, Tao is crucial to the dogs' survival.
- John Longridge: John Longridge is Elizabeth Hunter's godfather. He lives in a stone house in a small village about 300 miles from the college town where the Hunters live. Mr. Longridge wrote several historical books, is a writer by profession, and a bachelor.
- The Hunter Family: The Hunter Family consists of the father Jim, the mother and their two children, 11-year-old Peter and nine-year-old Elizabeth. Jim owns Luath, Elizabeth owns Tao, and Peter owns Bodger.
- Mrs. Oakes: Mrs. Oakes is the owner of the three animals while John is gone on his trip.
- The Nurmi Family: The Nurmi family is a family of Finnish immigrants. Ten-year-old Helvi discovers Tao unconscious in the river by her house, after he had been swept up by flotsam from a broken beaver dam while trying to swim across with the dogs upstream. Her family nurses him back to health, and he stays with them a few days before moving on.
- The Mackenzies: James and Nell Mackenzie are elderly farmers who live alone, now that their eight children have grown, and they are instrumental in helping the dogs to survive. Bodger charms his way into their home and their pantry, and Luath appears soon afterward, his instincts leading him to fetch for James while he is duck hunting. James removes porcupine quills from Luath's muzzle, allowing the dog to recover and continue his journey. Tao is present at the farm while his companions rest and recover, and instrumental in freeing the dogs from the barn, but he is unseen by the Mackenzies.
- The Lynx: The Lynx tried to attack and eat Tao, but a hunter killed him, without realizing Tao was in a rabbits' den the Lynx was digging into.
- Farm Dog: The Farm Dog was a sheepdog who attacked Luath, but Bodger intervened and fended him off.
- Bear cub: The Bear cub thought Bodger was a toy and pawed at him with his sharp claws until Tao intervened and tried to protect him.
- Mother Bear: The Mother Bear tried to protect her cub when Tao attacked him until she was chased off by Luath.

== Awards ==
- 1963 Dorothy Canfield Fisher Children's Book Award winner
- 1963 Canadian Library Association Book of the Year for Children Award winner
- 1963 American Library Association Aurianne Award winner
- 1964 International Board on Books for Young People (IBBY) honour

== See also ==
- Animal navigation
