= List of Srugim characters =

List of characters on Israeli television series Srugim

Srugim is an Israeli television drama which originally aired on Yes TV between 2008 and 2012. It was directed by Laizy Shapiro, who co-created it with Hava Divon.

The series contains five main characters played by Ohad Knoller, Amos Tamam, Ya'el Sharoni, Tali Sharon, Sharon Fauster, and Uri Lachmi.

== Main ==
=== Dr. Nati Brenner ===
Nethaniel Brenner
- Srugim character
- First appearance: "Episode 1"; 1x01, 23 June 2008
- Portrayed by: Ohad Knoller

In-universe information
- Nickname: Nati
- Title: Surgical intern
- Occupation: Doctor
- Family: Aaron (Grandfather); Gershon (father); Hadassah (mother); Roi (brother); Hani (sister); Atara (sister)

Portrayed by Ohad Knoller. His father is Gershon, he has a younger brother Roi, and two sisters, Hani and Atara. Nati is a Surgical intern at Hadassah Medical Center, originally from Ra'anana. During season 1 Nati turns 31. Went to Bnei Akiva seminary with Yifat. He is allergic to Eggplant. His only travel has been to China and India.

Nati lives in Jerusalem and goes to synagogue at Yakar. After Amir's divorce, Amir moves into Nati's apartment and they stay roommates until Amir moves out following his wedding to Yifat. When Nati's brother Roi moves to Jerusalem, he becomes Nati's roommate.

Nati's mother Hadassah died on the day of Amir and Yifat's wedding. Nati does not take his mother's death well and struggles with how to handle things with his father. Four months after his mother passes away, his father begins dating another woman named Vera, which makes Nati very uneasy.

At age 12 Nati dated a girl named Shira Berkowitz, who he agreed to marry if she was still single at age 30. Two weeks prior to her 30th birthday, Shira reaches out to Nati while visiting Jerusalem. When she arrives she informs him she is about to be engaged to her boyfriend, Nadav. After she leaves Nati realizes he loves her, drives to the north to propose to her, upon returning he believes it was a mistake, however she had already broken up with Nadav.

After Yifat tells Nati that she loves him, Nati says that he isn't sure how he feels, and describes himself as stone or tin. Despite his fears, when she asks if he wants to try, he says yes. Nati ends up spending the night, when Yifat asks him to come back for lunch, he says yes, but instead goes home to have lunch alone. Nati continues to avoid Yifat, and when he sees her inside a store her runs outside, where he is hit by a car. Yifat winds up spending Shabbat in the hospital with Nati, and he apologizes to her, and told her he just didn't know what to say. Nati eventually realized that he does in fact love Yifat and he is missing out on what it would be like with her, however when he tells her she tells him it is too late.

Nati meets Nitzan at his hospital's fundraiser and begins to form a relationship with her. He later finds out that she was asking about him several weeks before in synagogue, and the way they met was clearly set up. Despite his reservations about dating her, he continues to and her father gets Nati an internship at Mt. Sinai Hospital in New York City. After Nitzan throws Nati a surprise birthday party, Nati tells her he is a private person and that was the most embarrassing day of his life, causing Nitzan to break up with him saying he was ungrateful. Nitzan later tells Nati that she loves him and still wants to be with him, but Nati states that he doesn't want to continue.

=== Amir Yechezkel ===
Amir Yechezkel
- Srugim character
- First appearance: "Episode 1"; 1x01, 23 June 2008
- Portrayed by: Amos Tamam

In-universe information
- Occupation: Grammar teacher
- Family: Meir (grandfather)
- Spouses: Naama (ex-wife); Yifat (wife)

Portrayed by Amos Tamam. Amir is a graduate of Hesder. He has an ex-wife named Naama, and his grandfather was named Meir. He is 30-years-old as of season 1. He is a grammar teacher at a girl's high school. He served in a religious unit of the army. He wear tzitzit daily but only learns Torah about once a month. He views himself to the right politically.

Amir is a Sephardic Jew of Tunisian descent. Amir grew up with no connection to his Tunisian Sephardic heritage as his father studied in Ashkenazi institutions and attends an Ashkenazi synagogue. While wearing his grandfather's old Tunisian style hat, Amir got pulled into the Tunisian synagogue to help make a minyan. After this Amir wanted to reconnect with his past and began attending services there more often, as well as taking lessons from the cantor.

Following his divorce from Naama he moves in with Nati. Amir and Naama originally were married right after she graduated from Bar Ilan University. Amir never actually proposed to Naama, and never bought her a ring, she told him they were getting married. While married they lived at 9 Rambam St in Jerusalem. When Amir meets up with Naama at their old apartment to clean it out, they end up having sex, making him need to give her another get. Following the divorce, Amir continues to wear his tallit to services, but ultimately has a stressful dream that makes him reconsider this decision.

After Yifat moves to Ma'ale Elisha, Amir begins visiting her more, first with Reut and then alone. After asking Yifat to go to a wedding with him, Amir gets angry and asks Yifat what their status is and what she wants from him. Although at the time she states she is confused, she eventually calls him in the middle of the night and says she wants to go to the wedding with him. Amir later asks Yifat to marry him, which she agrees to, however when she finds out he had sex with Naama after their divorce she is so upset she throws him out of her house, however after she moves back to Jerusalem they decide to get married.

As Amir and Yifat struggle to get pregnant, Amir tries making her chrysanthemum tea based on Shmuel's recommendation.

=== Yifat ===
Yifat
- Srugim character
- First appearance: "Episode 1"; 1x01, 23 June 2008
- Portrayed by: Ya'el Sharoni

In-universe information
- Occupation: Graphic artist
- Family: Ishai (brother); Eli (brother); Yoni (brother)
- Spouse: Amir (husband)

Portrayed by Ya'el Sharoni. She is originally from Petah Tikva, and has three brothers Ishai, Eli and Yoni. She went to Bnei Akiva seminary with Nati, where she was in the Malabes chapter.

Yifat is a graphic artist. Her career has mostly been making wedding invitations, bar mitzvah invitations, and various brochures. After Amir suggests that she should try and do more with her talents, Yifat creates a new ad and website, and gets the job to make the CD cover for Hamadregot.

At the beginning of the show she lives in Jerusalem and goes to synagogue at Ohel Nehama, and is roommates with Hodaya, in an apartment she inherited from her grandmother. Yifat eventually decides that the city is too much for her and she will move to Ma'ale Elisha. After living in Ma'ale Elisha, Yifat decides she wants to move back to Jerusalem with Hodaya, only to find out that Hodaya is no longer religious.

When she was born her parents did not throw her a kiddush, which she comes to understand is the reason why she is single at 30. She ultimately tells Nati about the kiddush, and that she was throwing it rather than tell him that she loves him. After professing her love, although he is nervous, she is able to convince Nati that it is worth trying. After spending that night however, Nati stands her up for lunch the next day. After the heartbreak, Yifat considers moving to Ma'ale Elisha (15 minutes from Jerusalem, down Alon Road), after she does a brochure for the settlement. Nati later comes to Ma'ale Elisha to see Yifat and profess his love for her, however she tells him she doesn't feel the same way anymore and kicks him out.

After moving to Ma'ale Elisha, Amir begins visiting Yifat more and they become closer. After being questioned by Amir as to her true feelings toward him, Yifat admits that she is confused and does not know how to answer him. After talking to her neighbor, Yaeli, Yifat realizes that she is meant to be with Amir. Amir eventually proposes to Yifat, to which she says yes, however after Amir admits he had sex with Naama, she kicks him out of her house. After moving back to Jerusalem, Amir and Yifat decide to get married anyway.

When Yifat realized that she would be niddah on her wedding day, she got so upset she told Amir that although she wants to keep family purity laws in their marriage she didn't want to on their wedding day. This continued to be a struggle for her in the days following the wedding, as she felt like without being able to touch Amir that they were just like roommates.

=== Hodaya Baruchin ===
Hodaya Baruchin
- Srugim character
- First appearance: "Episode 1"; 1x01, 23 June 2008
- Portrayed by: Tali Sharon

In-universe information
- Occupation: Cleaning woman Waitress
- Family: Miriam (mother); Shvut (cousin)

Portrayed by Tali Sharon. At the beginning of the show she was roommates with Yifat. She is originally from the Golan Heights. As a kid she was in the Achdut group of Bnei Akiva, in the Hispin chapter. During season 2, Hodaya turned 30. Her mother is Miriam and her father is a rosh yeshiva. She studied biblical criticism, to piss off her father, at Hebrew University of Jerusalem.

At the beginning of the show Hodaya cleaned apartments for a living. After becoming non-religious she becomes a waitress. During a stressful day in the restaurant, Hodaya walks out, and Yifat suggests she use her bible degree to become a tour guide at the Bible Lands Museum, which she attempts to do, however she runs out during her introduction.

While she struggles with her faith she begins wearing pants, however she is embarrassed by it when she sees her grandmother on the streets and avoids her. Later, after forgetting to turn off the light in the fridge, she turns it off on Shabbat, causing a big fight between her and Yifat.

While she continues to struggle with her lifestyle when she meets a man on the bus named Avri that asks her to see a movie Friday night, to which she is embarrassed to admit why she won't go. He later invites her out to dinner, only to surprise her with a home cooked meal which included both milk and meat, but she again is too embarrassed to admit that she keeps kosher and reluctantly eats a bite before excusing herself, as just seeing the meat and cheese together made her physically ill. She ultimately tells Avri it won't work, without giving a reason, and calls Yoav, a religious man she met at the bus stop, to go on a date. Hodaya changes her mind and agrees to go out with Avri again, despite her reluctance to tell him the truth. After Avri tries to kiss Hodaya she pulls away, still unable to tell him why, so Avri decides to break up with her. After a fight with Yifat, she returns to Avri and asks her if she could stay at his place. The next morning, on Shabbos, Hodaya suggests to Avri that they drive to the beach, however while there it becomes too much for her, she breaks down and tells him the truth. Avri and Hodaya agree to keep dating despite their religious differences, with the agreement of no more lies. Fulling discussions with Avri about niddah, Hodaya decides to go to the mikvah, however when the time comes for them to have sex, Hodaya tells him she can't and breaks up with him again.

When Hodaya's cousin Shvut visits, Hodaya says she is envious of Shvut since she feels anger toward God, and Hodaya states she has not felt anything in years. After Shvut leaves, Hodaya continues watching TV as the Shabbat horn sounds. Hodaya decides that she is no longer interested in her program at school, as all she will be able to do with it is teach religion. When Hodaya decides she needs a roommate she cannot decide if she should ask for someone Shomer Shabbat and Kashrut or not. When Yifat decides she wants to move back in with Hodaya, Hodaya tells Yifat they can't because she is no longer religious.

Hodaya's first experience with a guy after become non-religious is a coworker from the bar she works at, Assaf, however the entire one night stand situation makes her very uncomfortable. Hodaya attempts to end things with him after their one night and begins avoiding his calls, however Assaf is very persistent and does not want to let her just walk away. When Hodaya gets invited to Shabbat dinner at Yifat and Amir's, Assaf tries to convince her not to go because she will feel uncomfortable. They continue to date, however when Asaf accused Hodaya of only wanting to go to a club to prove something, she storms out and calls Avri to meet her at a bar, and despite him admitting to being in a relationship, they kiss before parting After Assaf accepts a job offer in Tel Aviv, he asks Hodaya to move in with him there, and the ultimately rent an apartment at 34 Harakevet Street. While spending time in Tel Aviv, Hodaya continues to see people with tattoos and decides to get a black bird tattooed on her right shoulder.

=== Reut Rosen ===
Reut Rosen
- Srugim character
- First appearance: "Episode 1"; 1x01, 23 June 2008
- Portrayed by: Sharon Fauster

In-universe information
- Occupation: Accountant
- Family: Ofra Rosen (mother), Elisheva Rosen (sister)

Portrayed by Sharon Fauster. She has a younger sister named Elisheva, and her father died several years before season 1. Reut's mother Ofra Rosen is on the ticket for the National Religious Party. Reut drives a motorcycle.

Reut is an accountant who makes good money, managing the Bonds Department at Davidian's, where she makes 18,000 shekels plus expenses. Although she makes good money, she chooses not to buy nice things, because she feels if she does she will get too comfortable and not need to get married.

She is a feminist and feels there is no reason why women shouldn't say kiddush. Reut later decides to take lessons in how to lein from the Torah, and winds up reading the Haftorah at an all woman's service on Rosh Chodesh.

While taking lessons on how to read Torah, Reut develops feelings for her tutor, Yochai. Reut invites Yochai to Yifat's for Shabbat dinner, and while walking her back he kisses her and immediately apologizing and runs away. The next day Yochai asks Reut to marry him in order to atone for his sins. Reut, unsure how to react to the proposal suggests instead they try dating instead of jumping into marriage. When Yochai finds out that she is also dating Noam at the same time, Yochai makes her choose which one she wants to continue dating, to which Reut chooses Yochai. Reut later gets very upset with Yochai when he wants to learn how to ride her scooter, however he tries to show off and hurts himself in addition to damaging to scooter. When Yochai tells her he has decided to take a real job, she tells him that he shouldn't take it, and he should be studying Torah. After meeting Elisheva's fiancée, Dudi, with Yochai, Reut realizes she must break up with Yochai because she doesn't love him. Following their break up Reut decides she needs to take a leave of absence from work and goes to spend time in India.

While spending her six months in India, Reut missed Amir and Yifat's wedding, and returned during the period of time Nati was sitting shiva for his mother. Reut while at shiva, meets Nati's brother Roi when she returns to him his India Lonely Planet travel guide. As Reut beings to have interest in Roi, she finds out where he is going to be for lunch so she can bump into him, however when she finds out he is there with another woman she panics and pretends to be there to pick up food for the needy on volunteer work. Following this encounter Roi calls Reut to help her deliver meals, and after they are done they agree to go on a real date the next night. As they continue to get closer, Reut invites herself over the Brenners for Friday night dinner. After dinner Reut questions Roi as to what is bothering him, and although he won't admit it to her, Roi tells Nati that he is gay. When Roi attempts to break up with her without giving a reason, Reut leaves but later comes back yelling demanding an answer, and he admits to her that he is gay. After Reut gets a call from Roi's friend Meir, and he explains how despite being gay he is married with four kids and a great father, Reut decides to give Roi a chance anyway.

=== Roi Brenner ===
Roi Brenner
- Srugim character
- First appearance: "Episode 16"; 2x01, 10 January 2010
- Portrayed by: Uri Lachmi

In-universe information
- Family: Aaron (Grandfather); Gershon (father); Hadassah (mother); Nati (brother); Hani (sister); Atara (sister)

Portrayed by Uri Lachmi. His father is Gershon, he is the younger brother of Nati, and has two sisters, Hani and Atara. Roi was with his mother, Hadassah when she died, and helped her say Shema right before hand. Following his mother's death, Roi moves to Jerusalem and becomes Nati's roommate. While in Jerusalem he is studying for his bar exam, and working one day a week at the law firm Grossman-Tzuberi.

While sitting shiva for his mother, Reut meets Roi when she returns his India Lonely Planet travel guide to him. After Roi moves to Jerusalem he joins everyone for Shabbat dinner at Yifat and Amir's, and begins to develop feelings toward Reut. After Roi bumps into Reut doing what he thinks is volunteering to pick up food for the needy, Roi asks Nati for Reut's number, so the two of them could do the volunteer work together. After they finish their volunteer work they agree to go on a date together the following night.

Although Roi and Reut continue to get closer, Roi eventually admits to Nati that it won't ever go anywhere because he is gay. The following week Roi attempts to tell Reut he is gay, by explaining about his first love, during his first year in yeshiva, however he cannot muster the courage to say the words. Roi later tells Reut it won't work between them, without giving her the actual reason why, however when she later yells at him demanding an answer, he admits the truth. Roi asks his friend Meir, who is gay but married with four kids, to talk to Reut about the situation, and afterwards they decide to give it a chance, despite the situation.

== Recurring ==
- Chaya portrayed by Sara von Schwarze, the headmistress at the school where Amir works.
- Dr. Avri Sagiv portrayed by Zohar Strauss. He works at Hebrew University in archaeology and meets Hodaya on the bus and takes a liking to her. After Hodaya gets into a fight with Assaf on her birthday, she calls Avri to meet her at a bar, where he reveals he has been in a relationship with someone for six months, however still kisses Hodaya before she leaves.
- Elisheva Rosen portrayed by Ma'ayan Weinstock, Reut's younger sister, who as of season 1 is 22. She agrees to go out with Amir, however when she finds out he is divorced she breaks up with him. Elisheva later becomes engaged to Dudi, an air force helicopter pilot, and they get married while Reut is in India. Soon after getting married Elisheva becomes pregnant and begins volunteering to play the harmonica once a week at an old-age home.
- Yochai portrayed by Moti Brecher, is a tutor for bar-mitzvah aged boys, teaching them how to read from the Torah. He is 28 during season 1 and is born in Tammuz. His mother is named Hannah.

He learned to lein from his late father. When Reut comes to him for a lesson on reading from the Torah, he refuses as he feels it is not right for a woman to read from the Torah. Despite his initial reservations on teaching her, when she reads the Haftorah, Yochai watches from the window.
After Shabbat dinner with Reut at Yafit's, Yochai walks Reut home and kisses her, before pulling away and apologizes, asking for forgiveness. The next day, Yochai asks Reut to marry him in order to atone for his sin of kissing her.
Yochai decides that he needs a real job, and decides to join his uncle's company selling office supplies.

- Naama portrayed by Noa Kooler, Amir's ex-wife. She has a hard time being divorced, feeling very lonely, and not liking the type of guy everyone feels she should be set up with. She eventually makes the decision to stop covering her hair because she felt it interfered with dating. When she received a fur coat for her wedding she donated it to Nitzan's elite fashion charity. Naama eventually gets remarried, goes to Thailand on her honeymoon, and is 26 weeks pregnant at the time Amir and Yifat get married.
- Shani portrayed by Liat Harlev, a nurse who works with Nati. After Nati opens up to her about the struggles of things religious people miss out on, Shani tells him that she is jealous he still has so much more to experience, and kisses him.
- Nitzan portrayed by Yuval Scharf, from Givat Shmuel, and is 24 as of season 1. Daughter of a Naftali Sion from Sion Quarries, a major donor to Nati's hospital, who has a private jet, a house in Moscow and New York. Nitzan saw Nati at synagogue and asked around about him a few months before she meets Nati at a fundraiser. She has an elite fashion charity, that Amir knew her through. She studied fashion in London and then returned to Israel to design a fashion line for religious women. Nitzan ultimately breaks up with Nati after she felt he was ungrateful for the surprise birthday party she threw for him.
- Gershon Brenner portrayed by Michael Warshaviak. He is a widower to Hadassah (after 35 years of marriage) and father to Nati, Roi, Hani and Atara. He loves quoting poetry. While on a tour in Jerusalem, Gershon meets a woman, Vera, who he begins seeing.
- Assaf portrayed by Gal Pertziger. He meet Hodaya when he gets a job as a waiter at the restaurant Hodaya works at after deciding to no longer be religious. He too was formerly religious and went off the derech 18 months prior to season 2. After Hodaya and Assaf have a one-night stand she tried to push him away, however he is persistent and does not want to let her just walk away. Assaf later accepts a job in Tel Aviv as a security guard for a newspaper, which he hopes will lead him into a career in journalism. After starting his job in Tel Aviv, Assaf begins looking for apartments there and asks Hodaya to move in with him there.
- Clumsy waitress portrayed by Alena Yiv
- Shmuel portrayed by Uri Gavriel. Shmuel is a member of the Tunisian synagogue that Amir enjoys going to. Shmuel has 14 grandchildren, with his eldest granddaughter being named Ya'ara.
- Azaria ben Atar portrayed by Yisrael Bright
- Tehila portrayed by Dikla Elkaslasi
- Dafna portrayed by Nati Kluger
- Vera portrayed by Raymonde Abecassis
- Chani portrayed by Shira Katzenelenbogen
- Faigi portrayed by Mali Levi
- Stacy portrayed by Shira Katz
