= Srugim season 3 =

Season of Israeli television series Srugim

Srugim
- Season 3
- Starring: Ohad Knoller; Amos Tamam; Ya'el Sharoni; Tali Sharon; Sharon Fauster
- No. of episodes: 15

Release
- Original network: Yes
- Original release: October 23, 2011 – January 29, 2012

Season chronology
- ← Previous; Season 2

The third season of Srugim, is an Israeli television drama which originally aired on Yes TV between 23 October 2011 and 29 January 2012. It was directed by Laizy Shapiro, who co-created it with Hava Divon.

In 2012 it was announced that season 3 is the final season.

== Cast ==
=== Main ===
- Ohad Knoller as Dr. Nethaniel "Nati" Brenner
- Amos Tamam as Amir Yechezkel
- Ya'el Sharoni as Yifat
- Tali Sharon as Hodaya Baruchin
- Sharon Fauster as Reut Rosen
- Dikla Jika Elkaslassy as Tehila

=== Recurring ===
Ariel, Amir's study partner

== Plot ==
Yifat finally becomes pregnant. Roi has turned ultra-orthodox and has an arranged marriage. Amir quits his job as a teacher, finds a new one as Reut's secretary and finally receives a lifelong tuition to study in a seminary. Nati has a new roommate, a poet named Azaria, who was abandoned by his fiancée, Tehila. Nati falls in love with Tehila but cannot convince her to see him for she vowed to remain single until Azaria finds a new partner. Nati encourages Reut to date Azaria, who begins to exploit her for her money. After becoming drunk, he confesses that he does not love her and she abandons him. Tehila starts seeing Nati; he is finally ready to commit and proposes to her, and she seems to accept. Hodaya encounters Avri again. He cancels his own planned wedding and asks her to marry him instead. Hodaya backs off once more, just a few days before the ceremony, leaving him heartbroken. Amir becomes friends with a boy at his yeshiva and goes to work in a ranch in the Negev with him for a few weeks. Hodaya receives a radio show of her own, becomes stressed and quits. Yifat admonishes her for her constant wavering. Tehila speaks with Azaria, and informs Nati they decided to resume their relationship. Nati sinks into depression. Yifat delivers her baby prematurely; Reut and Hodaya stay with her while Nati drives off to fetch Amir. He must stay in the empty ranch while Amir drives back to Jerusalem. Reut comes to bring him back, and they both reconcile while staying in the desert. Hodaya, who heeded Yifat's words, gets her job back and reunites with Avri. Amir and Yifat prepare to take their newborn son home.

== Episodes ==
No. overall	No. in season	Title	Original release date
31	1	""בוא אל פרעה" ('Come to Pharaoh')"	23 October 2011
Nati meets someone new and gets a new roommate. Amir and Yifat go car shopping. Hodaya and Avri meet up again.
32	2	""מועמד עם ניסיון" ('A Candidate with Experience')"	30 October 2011
Nati meets Azaria's ex, Tehila, whom he instantly likes. Hodaya accidentally runs into her ex, Avri.
33	3	""הכל ינוע ויסע" (Literally "Everything Moves and Will Travel")"	6 November 2011
Nati does whatever he can to see Tehila again. Amir struggles with looking for a job. Reut falls for Azaria and his poetry.
34	4	""ונזואלה" ('Venezuela')"	13 November 2011
Amir gets a great job offer but doesn't like the conditions it comes with. Reut and Azaria, Nati and Tehila get closer.
35	5	""מסכת נדרים" ("Tractate 'Vows'")"	20 November 2011
Nati struggles with a prank pulled at work. Hodaya and Yifat share some big news. Reut helps Azaria with finances.
36	6	""גורנישט מיט גורנישט" ('Nothing, Absolutely Nothing' -- Literally-in Yiddish: 'Nothing with Nothing')"	27 November 2011
Nati has a hard time at work with his superiors. Amir and Reut have issues at work. Hodaya becomes overwhelmed by the thought of her upcoming marriage.
37	7	""בואי כלה" ('Come in, Bride')"	4 December 2011
Nati hours get cut at work. Reut continues going to Azaria's poetry readings.
38	8	""תמנונים בברזלונה" ('Squid in Barcelona')"	11 December 2011
Nati gives Tehila a medical opinion she doesn't want to hear. Yifat is overwhelmed by being the breadwinner.
39	9	""דבר אחד אמיתי" ('One True Thing')"	18 December 2011
Yifat's brother visits, which makes things complicated for Hodaya. Reut has to help Azaria with finances again.
40	10	""כתר לתהילה" ('Crown of Glory'/'Crown for Tehila')"	25 December 2011
Yifat and Amir a peek at their baby. Nati and Azaria have issues at a poetry reading.
41	11	""ציפורי לילה" ('Night Birds')"	1 January 2012
42	12	""ויקרא שמה בישראל" ('And Let Her Name Be Called in Israel')"	8 January 2012
43	13	""סדום" ('Sodom')"	15 January 2012
44	14	""חד גדיא" ('One Kid')"	22 January 2012
45	15	""רוח אחרת" ('Another Spirit')"	29 January 2012

== Production ==
Principal photography for the third season began on 21 February 2010. In early May 2012, though the last season was considered the most successful so far, Shapiro and Divon announced they would not produce a fourth one, and the show was terminated.

== Ratings ==
The third season aired on Yes between 23 October 2011 and 29 January 2012. The TIM-TNS survey concluded that 11% of all internet users in Israel watched the show via Yes' website in November 2011, and 15% in January 2012, making it the third most popular on the net. The last season was considered both the most commercially and critically successful in the show's history.

== Awards ==
In the 2012 Israeli Academy of Film and Television Awards, Srugim was nominated in only one category, for Best Drama, and lost.

Year	Association	Category	Nominee(s)	Result
2012	Israeli Academy of Film and Television	Best drama series		Nominated
