= Srugim season 2 =

Season of Israeli television series Srugim

Srugim
- Season 2
- Starring: Ohad Knoller; Amos Tamam; Ya'el Sharoni; Tali Sharon; Sharon Fauster; Uri Lachmi
- No. of episodes: 15

Release
- Original network: Yes
- Original release: January 10 – May 9, 2010

Season chronology
- ← Previous; Season 1 Next → Season 3

The second season of Srugim, is an Israeli television drama which originally aired on Yes TV between 10 January 2010 and 9 May 2010. It was directed by Laizy Shapiro, who co-created it with Hava Divon.

== Cast ==
=== Main ===
- Ohad Knoller as Dr. Nethaniel "Nati" Brenner
- Amos Tamam as Amir Yechezkel
- Ya'el Sharoni as Yifat
- Tali Sharon as Hodaya Baruchin
- Sharon Fauster as Reut Rosen
- Uri Lachmi as Roi Brenner

=== Recurring ===
- Michael Warshaviak as Gershon Brenner
- Gal Pertziger as Asaf
- Alena Yiv as Clumsy waitress

== Plot ==
Season 2 began approximately six months after the conclusion of season 1. Amir and Yifat get married and now must cope with the new hardships, including fertility problems and the need to observe ritual purity. Amir returns to his roots and begins praying in a Tunisian synagogue with an old man named Shmuel. He is frowned upon by his Ashkenazi environment. Nati's mother dies and his brother Roi moves in with him. Reut returns from India after six months, after missing Amir and Yifat's wedding, as well as her sister Elisheva's wedding, who is now pregnant. Reut begins to date Roi, only to have Roi later reveal that he is a homosexual, to Nati's surprise. Reut refuses to give up on them and continues to date him, however Roi eventually ends things. Nati falls in love with Dafna, a divorced mother who works in his hospital as a medical clown, though he leaves her after realizing he cannot cope with raising her son. Hodaya, trying to lead a secular lifestyle, works in a pub and meets Assaf, another formerly religious man, with whom she loses her virginity. She breaks with him after discovering that he began practicing again.

== Episodes ==
No. overall	No. in season	Title	Directed by	Written by	Original release date
16	1	""שעת רצון" (A good moment)"	Eliezer Shapiro	Unknown	10 January 2010
Nati spends the day with Amir, and Hodaya spends the day with Yifat as they all get ready for Yifat and Amir's wedding. Hodaya struggles with her decision to go off the derech. Nati misses the wedding due to the death of his mother.
17	2	""פנים חדשות" (New Faces)"	Eliezer Shapiro	Unknown	17 January 2010
Nati's family sits shiva for his mother. Reut returns from a six month trip in India. Hodaya has a one night stand with Asaf from her restaurant and doesn't know how to react. Amir and Yifat learn to get comfortable with each other as a married couple.
18	3	""כמו פעם" (Like in the Old Days)"	Eliezer Shapiro	Unknown	24 January 2010
Roi moves in with Nati. Yifat starts going through Amir's things to see what they can get rid of. Nati struggles with the loss of his mom. Everyone gets back together for a Shabbat dinner, however Hodaya feels out of place, and they won't drink the bottle of wine she brought with her in a taxi on Shabbat. Reut and Roi begin to show interest in each other.
19	4	""מתן בסתר" (Secret Charity)"	Eliezer Shapiro	Unknown	31 January 2010
Reut attempts to get Roi interested in her. Nati goes out with a girl who makes him realize he doesn't learn enough. Yifat begins throwing up and is late for her period, only to realize Amir is sick too.
20	5	""שליש גן עדן" (A Third of Paradise)"	Eliezer Shapiro	Unknown	7 February 2010
Yifat tries to play matchmaker, setting Nati up with a former co-worker of Amir's, Michal, that they bump into, however Nati breaks up with her when he realized she used to date Amir. Reut begins to pursue Roi, and joins the Brenners for Friday night dinner, however after dinner Roi admits to Nati that he is gay. Hodaya teaches a girl how to act religious for a part in a play.
21	6	""מקח טעות" (Bad Bargain)"	Eliezer Shapiro	Unknown	14 February 2010
Hodaya celebrates her 30th birthday. Things get complicated between Reut and Roi, when Roi finally admits to her that he is gay.
22	7	""שפל רוח" (Poor Spirit/Humble)"	Eliezer Shapiro	Unknown	21 February 2010
Amir gets assigned going on a field trip instead of the promotion he wanted. Amir pushed Yifat to attempt to change her focus and use her skills for something bigger. Hodaya looks for a new job, as Assaf attempts to pursue being a journalist.
23	8	""עיר עפורה" (Grey City)"	Eliezer Shapiro	Unknown	28 February 2010
Amir and Yifat get into a huge fight, after Amir doesn't tell Yifat that he dented the bumper requiring 8,000 shekel of work. Nati struggles with how to handle his father, as his father struggles with being alone, but meets a woman named Vera. Assaf asks Hodaya to move to Tel Aviv with him and move in with him, however he becomes very update when she decides to get a tattoo.
24	9	""התערבות אלוהית" (Divine Intervention)"	Eliezer Shapiro	Unknown	7 March 2010
Assaf's sister gets into an accident and is taken to the hospital in Ein Karem which he chooses to handle without Hodaya. Amir and Yifat are trying to get pregnant. Nati struggles with his father seeing someone and storms out of a lunch with them.
25	10	""שבעה נקיים" (Seven Clean Days)"	Eliezer Shapiro	Unknown	14 March 2010
Yifat struggles with pills. Hodaya's relationship gets complicated.
26	11	""עולם של " (My World)"	Eliezer Shapiro	Unknown	21 March 2010
Hodaya mother visits her which makes her very paranoid. Roi shows he's good with kids when Reut shows she isn't. Nati tries to get close to Evyatar, but Dafna is unsure.
27	12	""מילוים" (Reserves)"	Eliezer Shapiro	Unknown	28 March 2010
Hodaya has trouble balancing her new life and her family. Amir struggles with having to choose between his country and his wife.
28	13	"" מחלת השכה הנודדת" (Wandering Amnesia)"	Eliezer Shapiro	Unknown	11 April 2010
Yifat realizes she needs to choose between having a baby and her dream job. Nati is the fourth most eligible religious bachelor in Jerusalem.
29	14	""שקשוקה" (Shakshouka)"	Eliezer Shapiro	Unknown	18 April 2010
Roi and Reut try to work on their issues. Hodaya, Yifat, and Amir all move in together.
30	15	""סמנים בדרךן" (Road Markers)"	Eliezer Shapiro	Unknown	9 May 2010
While going suit shopping for his dad's wedding, Roi meets another religious man who asks him out for drinks. The clown that Nati works with breaks up with him. Nati and Roi bond outside the wedding hall while their father gets married.

== Production ==
The second season was shot in the summer of 2009.

== Ratings ==
The second season was broadcast on Yes Stars between 10 January and 9 May 2010. During its airing, it was the most viewed show on Yes' website for February and May, and the second most viewed for March and April. The first episode was the site's most popular upload for 2010 in general. Channel 10 purchased this season and aired it from 16 October 2010 to 29 January 2011. It performed poorly, and had an average rating of merely 4.44%.

== Awards ==
In the 2010 Israeli Academy of Film and Television ceremony, held on 13 July, the show had the largest number of nominations for any candidate, with a total of seven: Best Drama, Best Script, Best Director and two double nominations for the Best Actor – to Knoller and Amos Tamam – and Best Actress, again to Sharoni and Sharon. It lost all except one, receiving only the Award for the Best Script.

Year	Association	Category	Nominee(s)	Result
2010	Israeli Academy of Film and Television	Best drama		Nominated
2010	Israeli Academy of Film and Television	Best script		Nominated
2010	Israeli Academy of Film and Television	Best director		Nominated
2010	Israeli Academy of Film and Television	Best actor	Amos Tamam	Nominated
2010	Israeli Academy of Film and Television	Best actor	Ohad Knoller	Nominated
2010	Israeli Academy of Film and Television	Best actress	Ya'el Sharoni	Nominated
2010	Israeli Academy of Film and Television	Best actress	Tali Sharon	Nominated

== Controversy ==
Bus stop posters for the second season of Srugim became the focus of a controversy when it was discovered that the pages of Jewish text used as a background for the poster's images included the Biblical word referred to as the "ineffable name of God," the description used for the Tetragrammaton (four Hebrew letters commonly transliterated into English as YHVH or YHWH).

Complaints from the ultra-orthodox community led to an agreement not only to have the posters taken down, but also that—given the presence of God's name—they would be buried in a genizah [a burial site for sacred texts], not merely discarded.
