= Srugim season 1 =

Season of Israeli television series Srugim

Srugim
- Season 1
- Starring: Ohad Knoller; Amos Tamam; Ya'el Sharoni; Tali Sharon; Sharon Fauster
- No. of episodes: 15

Release
- Original network: Yes
- Original release: June 23 – October 6, 2008

Season chronology
- Next → Season 2

The first season of Srugim, is an Israeli television drama which originally aired on Yes TV between 23 June 2008 and 6 October 2008. It was directed by Laizy Shapiro, who co-created it with Hava Divon.

== Cast ==
=== Main ===
- Ohad Knoller as Dr. Nethaniel "Nati" Brenner
- Amos Tamam as Amir Yechezkel
- Ya'el Sharoni as Yifat
- Tali Sharon as Hodaya Baruchin
- Sharon Fauster as Reut Rosen

=== Recurring ===
- Sara von Schwarze as Chaya
- Ma'ayan Weinstock as Elisheva Rosen
- Moti Brecher as Yochai
- Noa Kooler as Naama
- Zohar Strauss as Dr. Avri Sagiv
- Liat Harlev as Shani
- Yuval Scharf as Nitzan

== Plot ==
Yifat and Hodaya, who went to an all-girls school together, now share an apartment in Katamon, the hub of religious singles' social life in Jerusalem. Yifat meets Nati, a childhood friend who is now a successful doctor, and he introduces the two women to his roommate Amir, a recently divorced teacher. Reut, a high-earning accountant who is also a religious feminist, joins their small band. The five are all Religious Zionist, unmarried and in their late twenties or early thirties, and must cope with a society that expects people to marry early.

Yifat falls for Nati, who seems oblivious. When she confesses her feelings, he admits he knew it all along but does not reciprocate. Hodaya, who is becoming less pious, meets Avri, a secular archaeologist, and dates him but does not tell him she is religious. Amir must deal with the stigma of being divorced, which hampers his chances to enter a new relationship; when he encounters his divorcee, Na'ama, their mutual loneliness leads them to have sex. They must divorce again in a Rabbinical court. Reut wants to cantillate the haftara and convinces the initially reluctant Yochai to teach her. Though rejecting the notion of a woman chanting at first, he soon becomes enamored with her. When he cannot control himself and kisses Reut, he immediately proposes marriage. Unsure, she decides to keep dating him, and also sees another man simultaneously. Hodaya profanes the Sabbath for the first time in her life and then lets Avri drive her to the beach, where she tells him the truth.

Reut begins to lose interest in Yochai. Although intending to consummate her relationship with Avri, Hodaya flinches at the last moment and decides to end their romance, stating the differences between them are too great. Tired of Jerusalem, Yifat moves to a quiet settlement. Amir begins visiting Yifat and the two become close friends. Nati tries to approach her again, angering Amir. The two come to blows, but eventually reconcile. Amir and Yifat decide to marry. After meeting her niece, who was evicted from Gaza and subsequently lost her faith, Hodaya resolves to disaffiliate. Reut breaks up with Yochai and goes on a long trip to India.

== Episodes ==
No. overall	No. in season	Title	Directed by	Written by	Original release date
1	1	""כובשי קטמון" ("Katamon's Occupiers")"	Laizy Shapiro	Unknown	23 June 2008
Yifat and Nati meet at a speed dating event. Reut breaks up with her boyfriend of five months after he asks her to marry him. Amir is moving in with Nati following his divorce. Hodaya brings a guy, Bezalel, back to her apartment that she shares with Yifat. Yifat, Hodaya, Reut, Nati and Amir all have Shabbos dinner together.
2	2	""סיפורי סבתא" ("Grandmother's Stories")"	Unknown	Unknown	30 June 2008
Nati goes over to Yifat's to do laundry, and they make plans to go on a Monty Python marathon, but she cancels when she is called for a date. Amir helps Reut fix her broken bed.
3	3	""פינת השלולית" ("The Pond Corner")"	Unknown	Unknown	7 July 2008
Hodaya meets a man named Avri on the bus and bumps into him several times afterward; however she is thrown when he asks her to go see a movie on Shabbos. Yifat attempts to confess her feelings for Nati. Amir is afraid he will lose his job if they find out he is divorced, so he needs Reut to pretend to be his wife.
4	4	""לא כשר" (Not Kosher)"	Unknown	Unknown	14 July 2008
Hodaya spends more time with Avri but when he serves her pasta with unkosher meat and unkosher cheese together she becomes physically ill. Nati questions the hospital cafeteria's kosher certification. Yifat shows interest in a client (Arik), however he tells her he is not religious.
5	5	""גרוש ונטוש" (Divorced and Abandoned)"	Unknown	Unknown	21 July 2008
Amir bumps into Reut and her younger sister, Elisheva, at the movies, and asks Elisheva out. Nati and Amir set up an internet dating account for Amir. Yifat goes on a blind date, only to be stood up when Nati realizes it was her he was talking to.
6	6	""שירה חדשה" (A New Song/A New Shira)"	Unknown	Unknown	28 July 2008
Amir and his ex-wife have sex. Reut decided to take lessons on reading Torah, and shows interest in her tutor, Yochai. Nati reconnects with an ex, Shira Berkowitz, who he feels might be his true love.
7	7	""תפסיק לפחד" (You/She Will Stop Being Afraid)"	Unknown	Unknown	4 August 2008
Reut becomes closer to Yochai and invites him to Shabbat dinner. After dinner, Yochai walks Reut home, kisses her, and then apologizes for having done so. Hodaya's struggles with her religion create issues at Shabbat dinner when she ultimately storms out and asks Avri to stay by her. Yifat realizes her parents never threw her a kiddush and thinks that's why she is still single. Yifat tells Nati how she really feels, to which he responds "I know", but despite his fears, she is able to convince him to try to love her.
8	8	""חמרמורת" (Hangover)"	Unknown	Unknown	11 August 2008
Hodaya goes to the beach with Avri, which is too much for her, and she eventually breaks down and tells him the truth. Nati spends the night with Yifat, then stands her up for lunch the next day. Reut is unsure how to react to the fact that Yochai kissed her, and is even more confused after he proposes to atone.
9	9	""ניקוי יבש" (Dry Cleaning)"	Unknown	Unknown	18 August 2008
Reut accidentally invites two guys for the same Shabbat dinner. Nati, while continuing to avoid Yifat, is hit by a car while avoiding her. Yifat considers moving away from Jerusalem to Ma'ale Elisha, after making a brochure for the settlement just outside of the city.
10	10	""מנוחה ושמחה" (Contentment and Happiness)"	Unknown	Unknown	25 August 2008
Hodaya goes to the mikvah despite questioning her relationship, following a talk on niddah. Yifat moves from Jerusalem to Ma'ale Elisha. With Yifat gone, Nati has trouble figuring out where he belongs.
11	11	""שיווי משקל" (Balance -- Literally "Equal Weight")"	Unknown	Unknown	1 September 2008
Reut and Amir visit Yifat at her new home, and Amir comes back alone to visit her again. Yochai tries to impress Reut, however he falls off her scooter and hurts himself. Hodaya struggles with her feelings toward Avri. Nati opens up about his feelings to a nurse, Shani, who then kisses him.
12	12	""מלכודת הדבש" (Literally "Honey Trap")"	Unknown	Unknown	8 September 2008
Amir and Yifat continue to get closer. Yochai determines he needs a real job, and decides to join his uncle's company selling office supplies. Nati connects with Nitzan who he meets at a hospital fundraiser.
13	13	""חולמות" (Dreamers)"	Unknown	Unknown	15 September 2008
Yifat wakes up from a dream in which Nati professes his love, and calls Amir to say she was thinking about him. When Amir asks Yifat what her feelings are, she is unsure at first but ultimately decides to pursue Amir. Nati and Nitzan engage in a huge fight but ultimately become closer. Hodaya's niece Shvut visits. Hodaya becomes jealous when she realizes her niece is no longer religious.
14	14	""גט לחומרא" (Strict Divorce)"	Unknown	Unknown	22 September 2008
Reut struggles with her sister's marrying Dudi, and ultimately decides to break up with Yochai. Nitzan throws Nati a surprise birthday party, and when he is unappreciative she ends the relationship. Amir and Yifat become closer, however Amir finds out he needs to give Naama another get. Hodaya announces she wants to drop out of her program at school.
15	15	""אנה אפנה" (Where do I turn?)"	Unknown	Unknown	6 October 2008
Reut feels she needs to make some big changes and takes a leave of absence from her job to go to India. Amir gives Naama her get and then asks Yifat if she wants to marry him. Nati comes and professes his love for Yifat as well, who sends him away. Hodaya searches for a roommate and cannot decide whether or not she wants someone religious but ultimately decides to announce she is going off the derech. Yifat decides to move back to Jerusalem

== Production ==
Laizy Shapiro and Hava Divon became acquainted while studying in the Ma'ale School of Television, Film and the Arts. In 2005, the Gesher Multicultural Film Fund announced its intention to create a picture about religious-secular relations and held a contest for a script. Shapiro and Divon submitted a treatment for a romantic comedy about a relationship between a bachelor living in Ramat Gan and a young settler from Hebron. Shapiro told her he had a similar idea already in his second year in Ma'ale, in 2000. Their entry was rejected, but they met Jonathan Aroch, a veteran producer, who served as their mentor during the competition. Aroch suggested they write another outline. Their second script concerned a religious single from Jerusalem named Nati, who is frustrated with dating and has resolved to give it only another year and then marry the first woman he encounters. This second entry was also declined. Shapiro and Divon return to their regular jobs.

A year later, Aroch contacted both again, suggesting they make a television series about the religious singles scene in Jerusalem, the so-called "Katamon swamp" or "marsh". A real sociological phenomenon, the "swamp" is a large concentration of middle-class Religious Zionist men and women who remain unmarried at a relatively advanced age, a trend causing much strain in their society. Divon and Shapiro created a basic outline for a show, and conceived of the five main characters. They planned to name the series, Kovshei Katamon ("Conquerors of Katamon"), which is the name of one of the area's main streets and a reference to the neighborhood's "conquest" by members of the "swamp". The studios refused to accept the title. On 20 July 2006, Ma'ariv first reported about contacts between Aroch and the television companies of Keshet and Yes, concerning the future purchase of the series, labeled under the working title Sex v'ha'Ir haQdosha ("Sex and the Holy City"). It was reported that due to the high production costs expected, the companies considered broadcasting it first on satellite and later on terrestrial television, to ensure maximal revenues.

After Yes bought the rights, Aroch hired a group of screenwriters, many of them Ma'ale alumni and residents of the "swamp" themselves. Divon, Shapiro and their team wrote a full screenplay for a first season of 15 episodes. Shapiro was also chosen to direct it. Auditions were held in September and October 2007. Towards the end of the second month, Aroch himself selected the final name of the show, Srugim – alluding to the crocheted skullcaps worn by national religious men, which distinguish them from other sectors. Principal photography was held in the winter of 2008. All studio filming was carried out in Tel-Aviv, but external photography occurred in Jerusalem and in Nofei Prat, which served as the fictional settlement to which Yifat moves.

== Ratings ==
The first season aired on the satellite channel Yes Stars on 23 June 2008 and ended on 6 October. It became an immediate success, reaching the third place among satellite shows on its day of transmission. However, most of its audience watched it via the internet, on Yes' website: the first episode had 240,000 hits within days of being posted on the web. The interest Srugim generated in the Religious Zionist sector was the main source of its popularity; many of its more conservative viewers did not even own a television due to religious grounds. To answer public demand, Shapiro organized public screenings across the country, for which tickets were sold. Five weeks after the premiere, Yes announced that it intended to commission another season in light of the show's success. A week before the next one aired, the first season's episodes had 3 million views on the internet.

Keshet also purchased the show and ran the first season on the terrestrial Channel 2 between 18 April and 25 July 2009. All 15 episodes entered the weekly lists of the 20 most popular shows on television. On average, the Israel Audience Research Board estimated it had a rating of 13.85%, a share of 22.4% and an audience of 251,000 households. Its highest record was reached with the 13th episode, broadcast on 11 July, which had a 16.9% rating, 29% share and a viewership of 309,000 households. The season's lowest point was the 6th episode, on 23 May, which had a 10.5% rating, 16% share and an audience of 191,000 households.

== Awards ==
Srugim had six nominations in the Israeli Academy of Film and Television Ophir Awards Ceremony for 2009, held on 28 August. It won four: the Award for the Best Drama Series; the Award for the Best Script, which went to the writers' team headed by Shapiro and Divon; the Award for Best Actress, which was granted to Ya'el Sharoni, and the Award for Best Costume Design, given to Seri Sobol. Shapiro was nominated for the Best Director but lost it to Oded Davidoff, who made Pillars of Smoke (Timrot Ashan). Ohad Knoller was nominated for Best Actor, yet the award was won by Moshe Ivgy of The Arbitrator. Tali Sharon was also nominated for the Best Actress for her role in Srugim.

Year	Association	Category	Nominee(s)	Result
2009	Israeli Academy of Film and Television	Best drama series		Won
2009	Israeli Academy of Film and Television	Best script		Won
2009	Israeli Academy of Film and Television	Best actress	Ya'el Sharoni	Won
2009	Israeli Academy of Film and Television	Best actress	Tali Sharon	Nominated
2009	Israeli Academy of Film and Television	Best costume design	Seri Sobol	Won
2009	Israeli Academy of Film and Television	Best director	Laizy Shapiro	Nominated
2009	Israeli Academy of Film and Television	Best actor	Ohad Knoler	Nominated
