= Dikla Elkaslassy =

Israeli actress, director and screenwriter

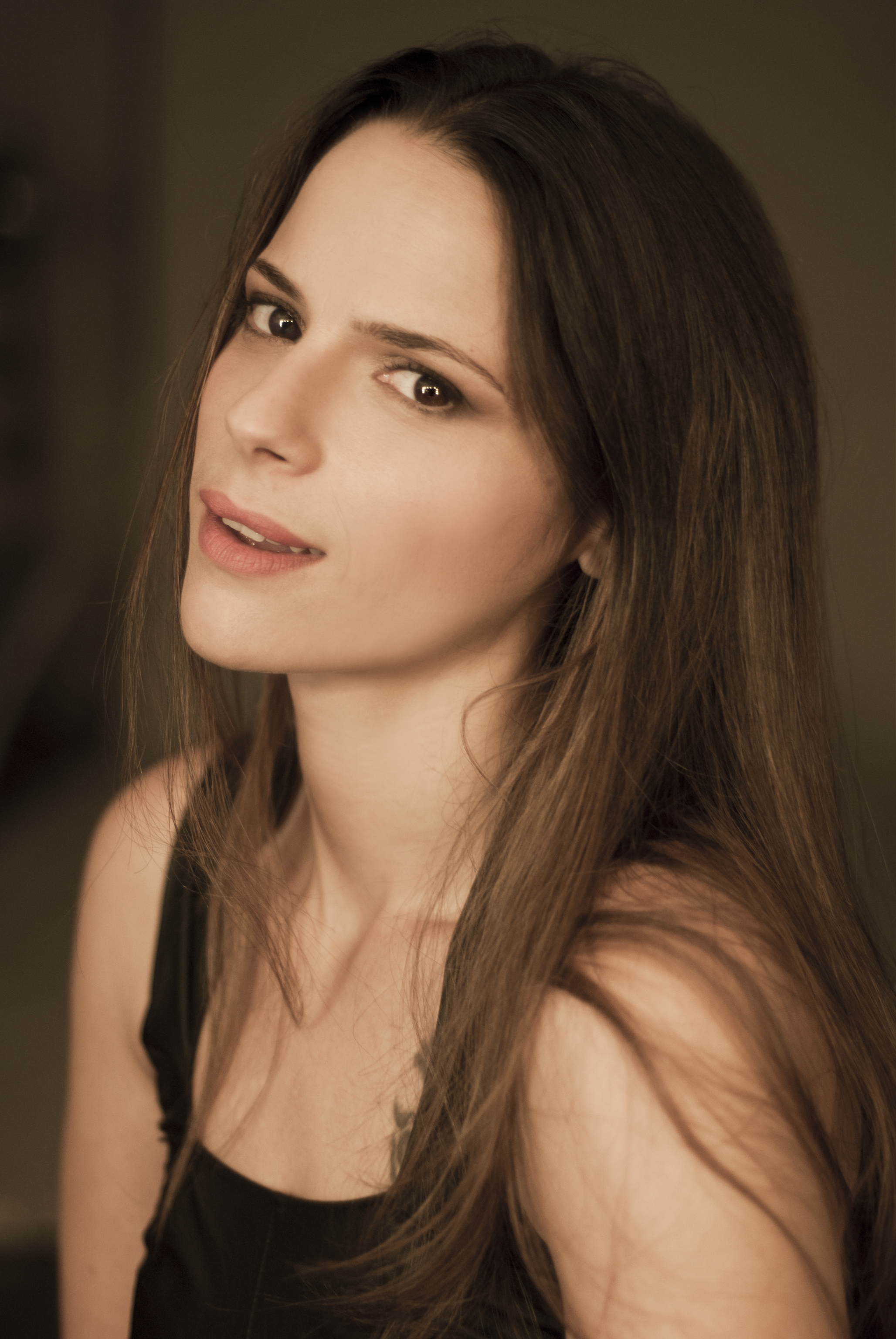
Dikla Elkaslassy

Dikla Elkaslassy (Hebrew: דקלה (ג'יקה) אלקסלסי; born 1 November) is an Israeli director, screenwriter and actress.

== Biography ==
Dikla (Jika) was born and raised in Israel. At the age of 18, she attended the School of Visual Arts in New York City and studied Animation (1998). In 2003 she studied acting at the HaDerech Studio of acting in Tel Aviv. In 2013, Elkaslassy completed the filmmaking track at the Minshar for Art, a film school in Tel Aviv, and graduated with honors.

Her movie Here I am… There you are was an Official Selection at the 2014 Sundance Film Festival, an Official Selection at the Seattle International Film Festival, and selected for the Official Competition at the American Film Institute's AFI Fest. The film received a nomination for the Ophir, the Israeli Academy of Film and Television award, for Best Short Film of 2014. Following the film’s success, Elkaslassy was invited to be a judge in the official competition at the Vilnius International Film Festival in 2014.

In 2015, Elkaslassy directed the second season of the television series Breaking Waves. The show was nominated for Best Youth Program that year, and I received a Best Director nomination at the Israeli Television Academy Awards. In 2016, she was awarded a grant from the Yehoshua Rabinovitch Foundation for the Arts to develop a feature-length screenplay based on my short film, Here I am… There you are.

In 2017, Elkaslassy directed two short films for the Association of Rape Crisis Centers in Israel. The Ministry of Education continues to screen these films in high schools across the country to this day. That same year, her original story "Arugam Bay" was adapted into an international television series. The screenplay was written with the assistance of the Israel Film Fund. The film was shot in August 2022 in Israel and Sri Lanka, directed by Marco Carmel, and is currently in the post-production stages.

== Filmography ==
=== Director ===
- 2010 - Hayerusha (short) written and directed
- 2011 - My Girl (short) written, directed, and acted
- 2012 - Pretty Mess (short) written, directed, and acted
- 2014 - Here I am... There you are... (short) written, directed, and acted
- 2015 - As Far As Tomorrow (short) written and directed
- 2016 - Braking Waves season 2 (TV drama series) directed
- 2018 - All real living is meeting (Short animation) produced and directed

=== Cinema (actress) ===
- 2008 - Shiva directed by Shlomi Elkabetz and Ronit Elkabetz
- 2009 - Revivre directed by Haim Buzglo
- 2010 - My Lovly Sister directed by Marco Carmel
- 2014 - Yona directed by Nir Bergman

=== Television (actress) ===
- 2010 - Ran 4 directed by Shlomi Elkabetz
- 2011 - Srugim 3 directed by Laizy Shapira
- 2014 - Breaking Wave directed by Marco Carmel
- 2014 - Harmon directed by Marco Carmel & Gadi Taub

=== Theatre (actress) ===
- 2007 - Der kaukasische Kreidekreis of Bertolt Brecht - directed by Moty Habarbuch
- 2008 - The 12 juror directed by Ilana Kivity

== See also ==
- Cinema of Israel
