= List of Srugim episodes =

List of episodes of Israeli television series Srugim

Srugim is an Israeli television drama which originally aired on Yes TV between 2008 and 2012. It was directed by Laizy Shapiro, who co-created it with Hava Divon.

As of January 29, 2012, 45 episodes of Srugim have aired. In early May 2012, though the last season was considered the most successful so far, Shapiro and Divon announced they would not produce a fourth one, and the show was terminated.

In February 2010, the series began to air on The Jewish Channel in the United States.

As of 2017, all of the series is available on Amazon Prime.

== Series overview ==
Series	Episodes	Originally released	
Series	Episodes	First released	Last released
1	15	23 June 2008	6 October 2008
2	15	10 January 2010	9 May 2010
3	15	23 October 2011	29 January 2012

== Episodes ==
=== Season 1 (2008) ===
No. overall	No. in season	Title	Directed by	Written by	Original release date
1	1	""כובשי קטמון" ("Katamon's Occupiers")"	Laizy Shapiro	Unknown	23 June 2008
2	2	""סיפורי סבתא" ("Grandmother's Stories")"	Unknown	Unknown	30 June 2008
3	3	""פינת השלולית" ("The Pond Corner")"	Unknown	Unknown	7 July 2008
4	4	""לא כשר" (Not Kosher)"	Unknown	Unknown	14 July 2008
5	5	""גרוש ונטוש" (Divorced and Abandoned)"	Unknown	Unknown	21 July 2008
6	6	""שירה חדשה" (A New Song/A New Shira)"	Unknown	Unknown	28 July 2008
7	7	""תפסיק לפחד" (You/She Will Stop Being Afraid)"	Unknown	Unknown	4 August 2008
8	8	""חמרמורת" (Hangover)"	Unknown	Unknown	11 August 2008
9	9	""ניקוי יבש" (Dry Cleaning)"	Unknown	Unknown	18 August 2008
10	10	""מנוחה ושמחה" (Contentment and Happiness)"	Unknown	Unknown	25 August 2008
11	11	""שיווי משקל" (Balance -- Literally "Equal Weight")"	Unknown	Unknown	1 September 2008
12	12	""מלכודת הדבש" (Literally "Honey Trap")"	Unknown	Unknown	8 September 2008
13	13	""חולמות" (Dreamers)"	Unknown	Unknown	15 September 2008
14	14	""גט לחומרא" (Strict Divorce)"	Unknown	Unknown	22 September 2008
15	15	""אנה אפנה" (Where do I turn?)"	Unknown	Unknown	6 October 2008

=== Season 2 (2010) ===
No. overall	No. in season	Title	Directed by	Written by	Original release date
16	1	""שעת רצון" (A good moment)"	Eliezer Shapiro	Unknown	10 January 2010
17	2	""פנים חדשות" (New Faces)"	Eliezer Shapiro	Unknown	17 January 2010
18	3	""כמו פעם" (Like in the Old Days)"	Eliezer Shapiro	Unknown	24 January 2010
19	4	""מתן בסתר" (Secret Charity)"	Eliezer Shapiro	Unknown	31 January 2010
20	5	""שליש גן עדן" (A Third of Paradise)"	Eliezer Shapiro	Unknown	7 February 2010
21	6	""מקח טעות" (Bad Bargain)"	Eliezer Shapiro	Unknown	14 February 2010
22	7	""שפל רוח" (Poor Spirit/Humble)"	Eliezer Shapiro	Unknown	21 February 2010
23	8	""עיר עפורה" (Grey City)"	Eliezer Shapiro	Unknown	28 February 2010
24	9	""התערבות אלוהית" (Divine Intervention)"	Eliezer Shapiro	Unknown	7 March 2010
25	10	""שבעה נקיים" (Seven Clean Days)"	Eliezer Shapiro	Unknown	14 March 2010
26	11	""עולם של " (My World)"	Eliezer Shapiro	Unknown	21 March 2010
27	12	""מילוים" (Reserves)"	Eliezer Shapiro	Unknown	28 March 2010
28	13	"" מחלת השכה הנודדת" (Wandering Amnesia)"	Eliezer Shapiro	Unknown	11 April 2010
29	14	""שקשוקה" (Shakshouka)"	Eliezer Shapiro	Unknown	18 April 2010
30	15	""סמנים בדרךן" (Road Markers)"	Eliezer Shapiro	Unknown	9 May 2010

=== Season 3 (2011–12) ===
No. overall	No. in season	Title	Original release date
31	1	""בוא אל פרעה" ('Come to Pharaoh')"	23 October 2011
32	2	""מועמד עם ניסיון" ('A Candidate with Experience')"	30 October 2011
33	3	""הכל ינוע ויסע" (Literally "Everything Moves and Will Travel")"	6 November 2011
34	4	""ונזואלה" ('Venezuela')"	13 November 2011
35	5	""מסכת נדרים" ("Tractate 'Vows'")"	20 November 2011
36	6	""גורנישט מיט גורנישט" ('Nothing, Absolutely Nothing' -- Literally-in Yiddish: 'Nothing with Nothing')"	27 November 2011
37	7	""בואי כלה" ('Come in, Bride')"	4 December 2011
38	8	""תמנונים בברזלונה" ('Squid in Barcelona')"	11 December 2011
39	9	""דבר אחד אמיתי" ('One True Thing')"	18 December 2011
40	10	""כתר לתהילה" ('Crown of Glory'/'Crown for Tehila')"	25 December 2011
41	11	""ציפורי לילה" ('Night Birds')"	1 January 2012
42	12	""ויקרא שמה בישראל" ('And Let Her Name Be Called in Israel')"	8 January 2012
43	13	""סדום" ('Sodom')"	15 January 2012
44	14	""חד גדיא" ('One Kid')"	22 January 2012
45	15	""רוח אחרת" ('Another Spirit')"	29 January 2012
