= Bar Brimer =

Israeli film and television actor (born 1997)

- בר ברימר
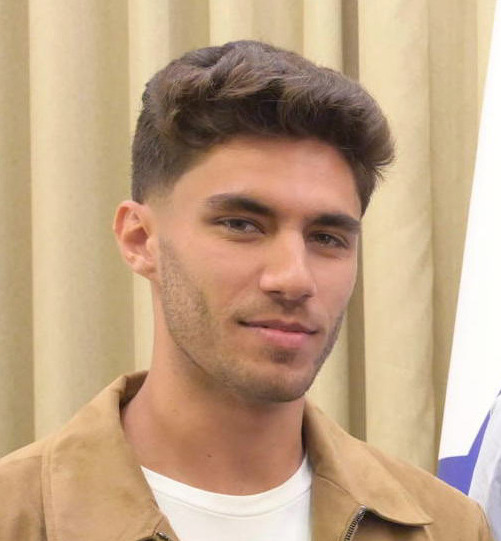
- Brimer in May 2022
- Born: 13 November 1997 (age 28); Petah Tikva, Israel
- Occupations: Actor; model

Bar Brimer (Hebrew: בר ברימר; born 13 November 1997) is an Israeli film, television and stage actor and model.

== Early life and education ==
He was born in Petah Tikva in Israel and from the age of six was dedicated to football, even playing in the national league. He abandoned his dreams of becoming a footballer when he was drafted into the Israel Defense Forces.

He graduated from a three-year acting program at the Yoram Loewenstein Performing Arts Studio in Tel Aviv.

== Career ==
=== Model ===
As a model he has worked on fashion campaigns with Adidas, Calvin Klein, Tommy Hilfiger, Factory 54 and One Project. He also featured in a campaign alongside Ran Danker for Renuar Jeans.

=== Actor ===
In 2020 he was cast alongside Noa Kirel and Omer Dror in the youth series, Kfula.

In 2021, he joined the cast of Baalat HaChalomot, acting alongside Daniel Litman and Odeya Rush. In the same year he was cast in the fifth season of the youth series Kfula, alongside Noa Kirel and Omer Dror.

In 2022, he had a guest role in Aleeza Chanowitz' aliyah comedy series on Hot 3, Chanshi. In the same year he became a series regular on the Nickelodeon series, Golda & Meir alongside Ori Laizerouvich.

In 2024, he began starring in the HOT comedy series, Metukim, alongside Rotem Sela and Amos Tamam.

In 2025, he began starring as a soldier in Metallists for yes, alongside Yadin Gellman. The series, created by Eran Zerhovich, is inspired by his military service with Sayeret Matkal.

In December 2025, he also began starring in the play "Lilsada" at Haifa Theater. It is adapted from Shemi Zarhin's 1995 film of the same name (Passover Fever). Brimer plays Shai Seter in the family drama and deals with eating disorders.

== Personal life ==
In 2020 he was voted "Israel's sexiest man alive" by Ynet readers.

Since 2021, he has been in a relationship with the Israeli singer, Agam Buhbut. He has also appeared in her music videos.

In 2022, Brimer revealed that he had filed a police complaint about sexual harassment from when he was 21 years-old. In 2023, he revealed that he had made the complaint against his former agent.

In 2024, he announced plans to leave his parents' home in Rosh HaAyin, and that he would move to a new apartment in the Florentin neighbourhood in Tel Aviv.

He revealed that he feels very connected to his Jewish faith, and puts on Tefillin every day: "Shabbat is something that is very important to me. And in general, all that guides me in life is faith, this is the thing that I stick to and that keeps me sane in all this madness."

== Filmography ==
Year	Title	Role	Notes
2020	Shirley Levy Finds Love		Web series
2020	Kfula	Itamar Hazan	Series regular
2020–2021	Dad is a Nanny	Roi	Series regular (2–3)
2021–present	Baalat HaChalomot	Lior Baruch	Series regular
2022	Spyders (ספיידרז)	Guy	TV series
2022	Chanshi	Tom	Guest role
2022–present	Ziggy	Itamar Nehemiah Michaeli	Series regular (3–5)
2022–present	Golda & Meir	Yon	Series regular
2024–present	Metukim	Ido	Series regular
2025–2026	Matkalists	Nadav "Hamor" Maor	Series regular
2026–present	Rokdim Im Kokhavim	Himself	Contestant (Season 12)
