= Alona Sa'ar =

Israeli actress

- אלונה סער
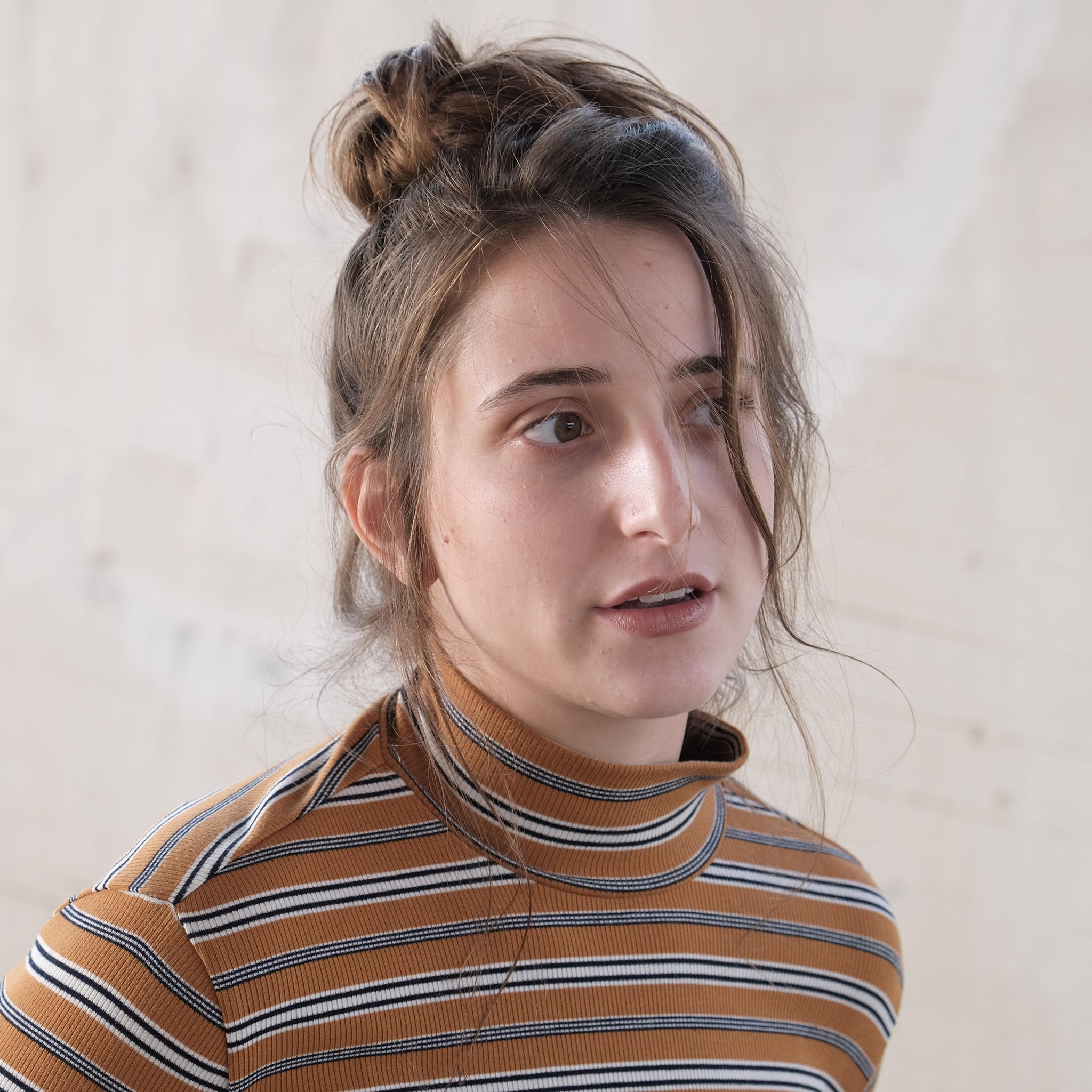
- Sa'ar, 2022
- Born: 24 August 1997 (age 29); Tel Aviv, Israel
- Education: Aleph High School of Arts Tel Aviv-Yafo; Yoram Loewenstein Performing Arts Studio
- Occupation: Actress
- Years active: 2010–present
- Partners: Amir Khoury (2018–2020); Melech Zilberschlag (2020–2021); Voodoo Daddy (2022–present)
- Father: Gideon Sa'ar
- Awards: Israeli Television Academy Award for Best Leading Actress in a Comedy Series for Dismissed (2021, 2022)

Alona Sa'ar (Hebrew: אלונה סער; born August 24, 1997) is an Israeli actress. She won the Israeli Television Academy Award for Best Leading Actress in a Comedy Series for Dismissed on Kan 11 in 2021 and 2022. (Note: The Israeli Television Academy Awards ceremonies are held in the spring, honoring achievements from the previous year.)

== Biography ==
Sa'ar was born and raised in Tel Aviv, the second daughter of Shelly Danziger and politician Gideon Sa'ar. She has an older sister and two half-siblings from her father's second marriage to Geula Even.

She graduated high school from Aleph High School of Arts in Tel Aviv, majoring in theater.

Sa'ar served in the IDF as a producer in the production division of the Education and Youth Corps, and as a director and writer.

In 2018, Sa'ar began studying at the Yoram Loewenstein Performing Arts Studio, but later dropped out.

== Career ==
In 2010, Sa'ar portrayed Reli in the play Habaita Habaita ("Home Home") by Yehoshua Sobol at the Beersheba Theater.

In 2016, during her military service, she appeared in the play Filter 18, directed by Gil Seri, at the Tmu-na Theater.

In 2017, she was cast in the role of Betty in The Crucible by Arthur Miller, directed by Gilad Kimhi, at the Cameri Theater.

In 2018, she played the lead role in a play based on the drama Spring Awakening at the Autumn Festival at the Cameri Theater, directed by Gil Seri.[1] That same year, she appeared in the music video for the song Eich She'at Koret Li (Ani Ba) ("The Way You Call Me [I Come]") by musician Gal Tevet.

Between 2020 and 2022, Sa'ar appeared in the teen drama Palmach, created by yes and aired on TeenNick, portraying the character Geula Danziger, inspired by the late Knesset member Geula Cohen.

In 2021, she portrayed Gefet in the comedy series Beluga Blues on Kan Educational. That same year, she also played a leading role in the series Dismissed (HaMefakedet) on Kan 11, as Second lieutenant Noa Levitan, a commander of a platoon of female recruits. In November of that year, she began performing in the musical Zero Motivation, replacing Magi Azarzar in the role of Zohar. She also appeared in the satirical sketch show Channel Zero (Arutz Efes) on Kan 11.

Since 2022, she has been a brand ambassador in commercials for Strauss’s "Delicious" brand. On March 24, 2022, she won the award for "Best Lead Actress in a Comedy Series" at the Israeli Television Academy Awards for 2021, for her role in the series Dismissed on Kan 11. Starting in April of the same year, she has been co-hosting the podcast Hafsaka Pe'ila ("Recess") with Adam Gabay on Radio Tel Aviv.

In March 2023, she began appearing on the satirical talk show Ma SheTagidu ("Whatever You Say") on Kan 11. In April, she won the Israeli Television Academy Award for Best Lead Actress in a Comedy Series for the second consecutive year, for her role in the series Dismissed. In June of the same year, she portrayed Tilly, an intelligence officer, in the drama series Red Skies ("Shamayim Adumim") on Reshet 13.

In May 2025, Sa'ar began participating in the 11th season (4th on Keshet 12) of Dancing with the Stars Israel (Rokdim Im Kokhavim), broadcast on Keshet 12.

== Personal life ==
Sa'ar began dating Arab-Israeli actor Amir Khoury in 2018; the couple separated in 2020. Between 2021 and 2022, she was in a relationship with journalist Melech Zilberschlag. Since 2022, Sa'ar has been in a relationship with rapper Yotam Jonathan Rabinu, known professionally as Voodoo Daddy.

Alona Sa’ar is known for publicly expressing political views that differ from those of her father, Gideon Sa’ar, a prominent right-wing politician. She has openly protested against policies of the government in which her father has held significant roles.

== Filmography ==
=== Television ===
Year	Title	Role	Network	Notes
2020–2022	Palmach	Geula Danziger	TeenNick (yes)	Historical drama series; Prominent Role
2021	Beluga Blues	Gefet	Kan Educational	Children's comedy series; Supporting role
2021	Arutz Efes ("Channel Zero")	Various roles	Kan 11	Satiric sketch show
2021–הווה	Dismissed	Second Lieutenant Noa Levitan	Kan 11	Comedy drama series; Main role
2023–present	Ma SheTagidu ("Whatever You Say")	Herself	Kan 11	Satirical talk show (Panelist)
2023–present	Red Skies	Tilly Rubin	Reshet 13	Action drama series; Supporting role
2025	Rokdim Im Kohavim	Herself	Keshet 12	Season 11 (4th on Keshet 12)

== Awards and nominations ==
Year	Award	Category	Title	Result	Source
2021	Awards of the Israeli Television Academy	Best Leading Actress in a Comedy Series	Dismissed	Won	
2022	Awards of the Israeli Television Academy	Best Leading Actress in a Comedy-Drama Series or Sitcom	Dismissed	Won	
2022	Frogi's Annual Choice Awards	Favorite Actress in a Teen Series	Palmach	Nominated	
2022	Children's and Youth Television Awards	Best Actress in a Drama Series	Palmach	Nominated	
2024	Awards of the Israeli Television Academy	Best Leading Actress in a Comedy-Drama Series or Sitcom	Dismissed	Nominated	
