= Manayek =

Israeli TV series

- Written by: Roy Iddan
- Country of origin: Israel
- Original language: Hebrew
- No. of seasons: 3
- No. of episodes: 30

Original release
- Network: Kan 11

Manayek (Hebrew: מנאייכ) is an Israeli television police procedural series. It is broadcast by Israel's public broadcaster, Kan 11, with three seasons airing since 2020.

== Plot ==
Izzy Bachar is an ex-policeman who works for the internal police investigations unit. He is assigned to a case in which one of his oldest best friends, Barak Harel, has been implicated.

== Cast ==
- Shalom Asayag as Izzy Bachar
- Amos Tamam as Barak Harel
- Ishai Golan as Eitan Doltsch
- Liraz Chamami as Tal Ben Harush
- Doron Ben-David as Ofir Leibowitz ("Leibo")
- Maya Dagan as Ronit Meinzer
- Omer Perelman Striks as Yoel Schwartz

== Production ==
The series was created by Roy Iddan and Yoav Gross, directed by Alon Zingman (who also directed the 2013 drama series Shtisel), and produced by Yoav Gross Productions.

The word manayek is a slang term in Hebrew for the police (or alternatively snitch), translated in the series as "Rats". The plot concerns an investigation into police corruption.

== Release ==
The first season went to air in 2020 on Kan 11. Cineflix Rights sold the series to HBO in Latin America, and Arte for release in France and Germany. In Australia, both series were shown on SBS on Demand in 2022. In the United Kingdom, it began streaming on Channel 4 in 2023.

The second season aired from 23 June 2022 in Israel.

== Reception and accolades ==
The first season of Manayek was one of Kan 11's highest-rated dramas ever.

The Jewish Chronicle, a British newspaper, gave the first season a five-star review. Josh Howie wrote: "With its taut, realistic dialogue and organically-developing plot, this award-winning series is a cut above your average crime fare." The series was also praised by Hannah Brown of The Jerusalem Post: " The scenes that look at Izzy's private life are artfully blended with the police plot...Amos Tamam, whom Srugim viewers remember as Amir, shows once again that he is very good at being bad...Manayek is the perfect series to turn to if you enjoyed the suspense of the intricate plot of Tehran.

Season 1 won Best Drama Series, Best Director in a Drama Series, Best Screenplay for a Drama Series, Best Leading Actor in a Drama Series, and Best Supporting Actor in a Drama Series at the 2021 Israeli Academy of Film and Television Awards.
