= Hen Avigdori =

- חן אביגדורי
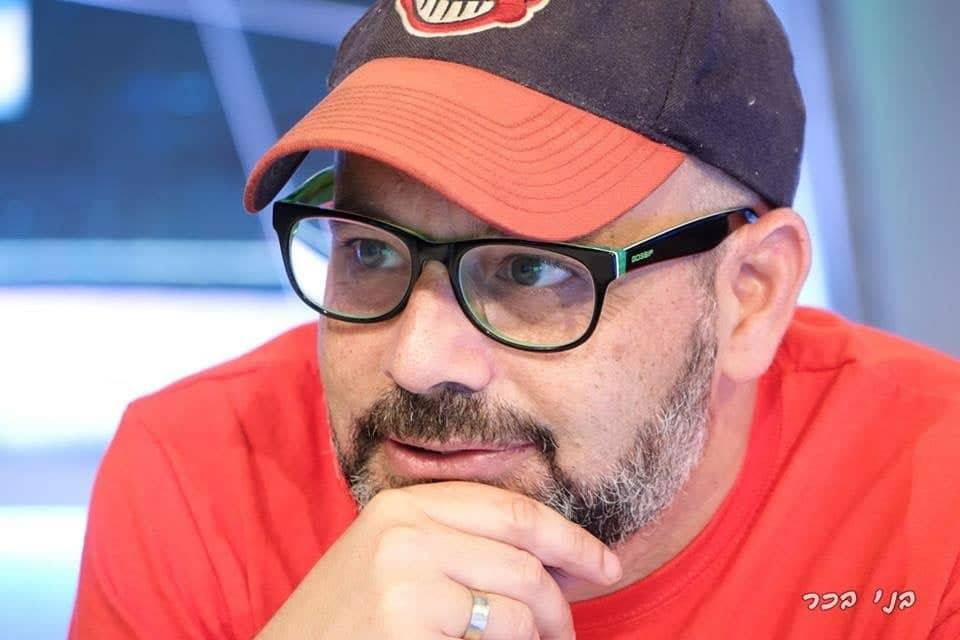
- Avigdori in the studio of Ad Kan (2018)
- Born: 19 April 1970 (age 56); Jaffa, Israel
- Occupations: Screenwriter, television creator, script editor

Hen Avigdori (Hebrew: חן אביגדורי; born 19 April 1970) is an Israeli screenwriter, television creator and script editor.

== Biography ==
Avigdori was born in Jaffa, Israel, and attended Amal B High School in Petah Tikva. He completed his compulsory IDF service in the Israeli Navy aboard a missile boat. Avigdori holds a bachelor's degree in political science from Tel Aviv University. After graduation he served as a parliamentary aide to Yael Dayan. He later managed a production studio at advertising agencies while simultaneously hosting and editing programmes on Radio Lev HaMedina.

== Professional career ==
=== Screenwriting credits ===
- 2003 – Writer for Rami Vered's talk show on Channel 10 and for the variety show HaMofaʿ HaMerkazi on Channel 2
- 2003–2006 – Daily talk show of Eli Yatzpan on HOT Channel 3
- 2004 – Kol Layla Im Assaf Harel
- 2005 – Heichal HaTarbut, starring Adir Miller and the comedy trio Ma Kashur (Channel 2)
- 2007 – HaYisraʾelim (The Israelis), starring Ma Kashur (Channel 2)
- 2009 – Shavua Sof (Channel 2)
- 2010 – Head writer, Mi Shoʾel Otcha? – a hidden-camera comedy quiz hosted by Lior Khalfon (Channel 2, Reshet)
- 2012 – Tzchok MeAvoda (Laughing from Work), hosted by Shalom Assayag (Channel 2)
- 2015 – HaYehudim Baʾim (The Jews Are Coming) – historical-satirical sketch series (Kan 11)
- 2017 – Tzomet Miller – sitcom created by and starring Adir Miller (Channel 2)

Additional work includes Agadat Deshe, Rokdim Im Kochavim (Dancing with the Stars Israel), Mi Lemaʿla?, Sof-Sheli, Tirʾu Mi Shoʾel, Nussbaum ve-Goldstein, HaHafranim, Coffee Talk and Achat SheYodaʿat.

=== Editing work ===
- 2012 – Series editor, Tzchok MeAvoda (Channel 2)
- 2012 – Editor-in-chief, sketch show Matzav Kafit (yes)
- 2014 – Hafraʿat Keshev – children's stand-up and talk show hosted by Shahar Hasson (The Children's Channel)
- 2016 – Science-comedy series HaHafranim
- 2017 – HaKol Avud – comedy series starring Tal Friedman (Channel 10)
- 2017 – Senior editor, game-show HaKol Holekh hosted by Dvir Benedek
- 2017 – Co-editor-in-chief (with Danny Karpel) of the political satire show Ad Kan! (Kan 11)

Further editing credits include Shishi Ad HaGag, Derby HaKaraoke, Shahar Hasson ve-Haverim, HaMoadon Tirʾu Mi Shoʾel and Achat SheYodaʿat.

=== Creator ===
- 2014 – Co-creator (with Shahar Segal) of the children's talk programme Hafraʿat Keshev (The Children's Channel)
- 2016 – Co-creator of the kids' sitcom Sof-Sheli (The Children's Channel)
- 2017 – Co-creator (with Danny Karpel and Ido Rosenthal) of the satire show Ad Kan! (Kan 11)

=== Other work ===
Avigdori made guest appearances in Tzomet Miller (Channel 2) and the sitcom Khaverot (Channel 10). He hosted the satirical late-Saturday-night radio show Kipodei Layla on Galei Tzahal's Tziporei Layla slot.

Since 2020 he has been a lecturer at the School of Communication, Ariel University.

== Personal life ==
Avigdori is married to Sharon, an emotional-therapist for children on the autism spectrum. They have a daughter and a son and live in Hod HaSharon. During the October 7 attacks, 2023, Sharon and their daughter Noʿam were taken hostage from Beʾeri and held in Gaza until their release on 25 November 2023 as part of the Israel–Hamas hostage deal.
