= Dismissed (Israeli TV series) =

- Genre: Comedy Drama
- Based on: The Love Letter (2017 short film)
- Written by: Nir Berger; Atara Frish
- Starring: Alona Sa'ar; Noa Astanjelove; Carmel Bin
- Music by: Tomer Katz; Echo Morgenstern
- Country of origin: Israel
- Original language: Hebrew
- No. of seasons: 3
- No. of episodes: 30

Production
- Producers: Saar Yogev; Naomi Levari
- Running time: 30-38 minutes
- Production company: Black Sheep Films

Original release
- Network: Kan 11

Dismissed (Hebrew: המפקדת, romanized: HaMefakedet, lit. The Commander) is an Israeli comedy drama television series broadcast on Kan 11 that premiered on 15 April 2021. The series follows a group of young women undergoing basic training in the Israeli army.

The second season premiered on 19 October 2022 and concluded on 20 November 2022.

On 20 November 2022, it was announced that the series had been renewed for a third season.

== Series overview ==
Series	Episodes	Originally released	
Series	Episodes	First released	Last released
1	10	15 April 2021	17 May 2021
2	10	19 October 2022	20 November 2022
3	10	9 September 2024	1 October 2024

== Plot ==
=== Season 1 ===
The story takes place in the "Ga'ash" (volcano) company at the fictional "Erez" rookie base. The main character, Noa Levitan (Alona Sa'ar) is a young, dedicated military officer who did not complete military training after being deemed unfit by her superiors but is nonetheless appointed to lead the training unit after the prior platoon commander is injured.

The group of inductees that Noa receives belong to the army's special needs program, and they have difficulty accepting the disciplinary rules and the authority of the commanders. During the training, the commanders are repeatedly challenged, leading the company commander to express his frustration with Noa's performance even as she attempts to prove herself in the job.

The first season of the series ends with the dispersal of the female soldiers to their regular service at the end of their training.

=== Season 2 ===
In the second season, Noa's platoon receives a cohort from the Atuda program of university reservists. Into the role of deputy platoon commander arrives Lt. Tully (Noam Logsi) who takes the reins of management much to Noa's dismay. At the same time, Noa, who wants to make a good impression on the command staff, endeavors to induct the nephew of the base commander into her platoon.

The rookie platoon is chosen to serve as a pilot for a new model called "Basic Training 2025" and Lt. Tully is chosen to be responsible for its implementation. The nephew of the base commander is assigned to the reservist department and has difficulty integrating socially and develops disciplinary problems. Tully, who brings a different approach to the trainees is met with hostility from the other commanders. During the rotation, difficulties for the department's staff arise from conflicts between meeting the mission and implementing new procedures in the face of ego battles within the company.

== Reception ==
The series received generally positive reviews, with critics praising the ensemble cast and the portrayal of social dynamics among the group of recruits.

International rights to the series were acquired by WestEnd Films in May 2021.

== Awards and nominations ==
At the Israeli Television Academy Awards in 2021, the show was nominated for 16 awards in 14 categories, of which it won 10, including Best Comedy Drama Series, Best Directing, Best Screenplay, Best Actress in a Comedy Series, and Best Supporting Actress in a Comedy Series.
