= Tirat Carmel =

Tirat Carmel טירת כרמל
- City

Hebrew transcription(s)
  - ISO 259: Ṭirat Karmell
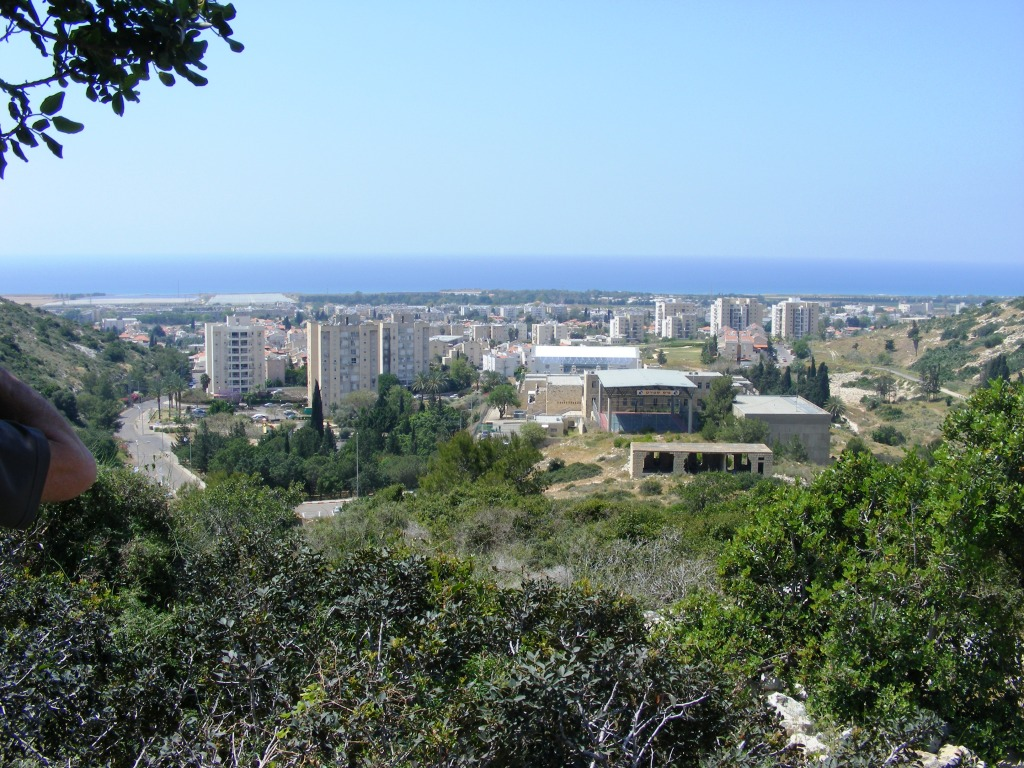
- View of Tirat Carmel

- Coat of arms

- Location within Israel Tirat Carmel (Israel)
- Coordinates: 32°46′N 34°58′E
- Country: Israel
- District: Haifa
- Subdistrict: Haifa

Government
  - Mayor: Dudu Cohen

Area
  - Total: 5,601 dunams (5.601 km^{2}; 2.163 sq mi)

Population (2024)
  - Total: 32,167
  - Density: 5,743/km^{2} (14,870/sq mi)

Ethnicity
  - Jews and others: 99.2%
  - Arabs: 0.8%
- Website: www.tirat-carmel.muni.il

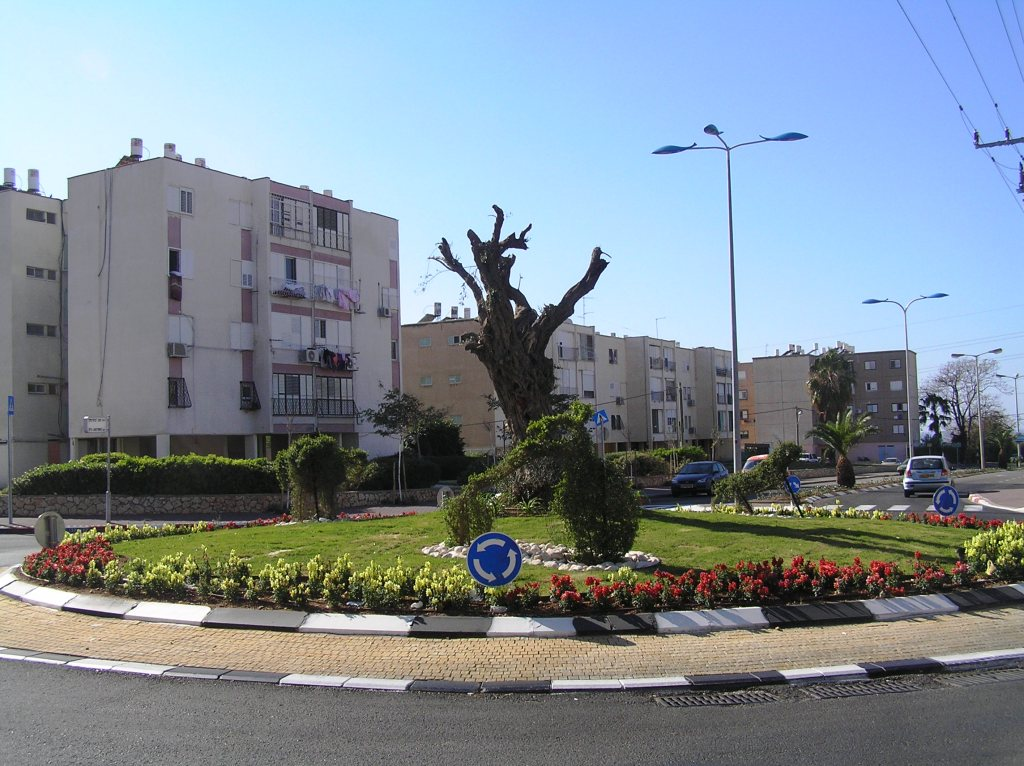
Street in Tirat Carmel

Tirat Carmel (Hebrew: טירת כרמל), or Tirat HaCarmel, is a city in the Haifa District in Israel. Throughout the ages, the site of the modern city was controlled by many people, including the Romans, the Ottoman, and the British. The modern city was established on the site of the Palestinian Arab village of al-Tira. The town of Tirat Carmel was officially declared a city in 1992. In 2024 it had a population of 32,167.

== History ==
Tirat Carmel is built on the ruins of the town of al-Tira which was occupied by Israeli paramilitary organisations during the 1948 Palestine war. Crusaders called it St Yohan de Tire. It was ruled by the Ottomans in late medieval and Renaissance times and was an agricultural area with wheat and goats and other farms. While conscription in the late 1800s harmed the town, it recovered, and by 1945 was an agricultural Muslim community with a Christian minority. The town was known for production of olives and almonds.

In 1949 two absorption centers were established for Jewish immigrants in the same location, which in 1954 were reorganized into the municipality of Tirat Carmel.

== Demographics ==
Historical population
Year	Pop.	±%
1972	14,200	—
1983	15,500	+9.2%
1995	17,500	+12.9%
2008	18,600	+6.3%
2022	29,069	+56.3%
2024	32,166	+10.7%

According to CBS, in 2001 the ethnic makeup of the city was 99.6% Jewish and other non-Arab, with no significant Arab population.

According to CBS, in 2001 there were 9,200 males and 9,300 females. The population of the city was spread out, with 31.2% 19 years of age or younger, 16.7% between 20 and 29, 19.4% between 30 and 44, 17.8% from 45 to 59, 4.1% from 60 to 64, and 10.9% 65 years of age or older. The population growth rate in 2001 was 0.8%.

== Economy ==
According to CBS, as of 2000, in the city there were 6,068 salaried workers and 411 are self-employed. The mean monthly wage in 2000 for a salaried worker in the city is ILS 4,428, a real change of 6.6% over the course of 2000. Salaried males have a mean monthly wage of ILS 5,621 (a real change of 4.3%) versus ILS 3,211 for females (a real change of 9.0%). The mean income for the self-employed is 4,818. There are 450 people who receive unemployment benefits and 1,891 people who receive an income guarantee.

== Education ==
According to CBS, there are 9 schools and 3,049 students in the city. They are spread out, as 6 elementary schools and 1,681 elementary school students, and 6 high schools and 1,368 high school students. 59.8% of 12th grade students were entitled to a matriculation certificate in 2001.

== Voting Patterns ==
In the 2022 election, 70 percent of voters in Tirat Carmel voted for the parties of the right-wing coalition led by Benjamin Netanyahu, while 27 percent voted for the parties of the center-left coalition led by Yair Lapid and 0.3 percent voted for the Arab parties.

In the 2026 election, 63 percent of voters in Tirat Carmel voted for the parties of the right-wing coalition led by Benjamin Netanyahu, while 30 percent voted for the parties of the center-left coalition led by Gadi Eisenkot and 0.5 percent voted for the Arab parties. An additional 3.7 percent voted for the Reservists, and 1.8 percent voted for Amcha Yisrael. Voter turnout increased 22 percent from the 2022 election.

== Notable people ==
- Gene Simmons (born 1949 as "Chaim Witz"), musician, singer, actor, bassist and co-lead singer of Kiss
- Reuven Atar (born 1967), footballer
- Shalom Asayag (born 1969), actor and comedian
- Marco Balbul (born 1967), former footballer and manager
- Rafi Cohen (born 1974), footballer
- Carmel Eliash (1933–1973), politician
- Sharon Gal (born 1974), journalist and politician
- Haim Megrelashvili (born 1982), footballer
- Rostam Bastuni (1923–1994), politician and journalist, first Israeli Arab to represent a Zionist party in the Knesset
- Roi Atar (born 1994), footballer

== Twin towns ==
Tirat Carmel is twinned with:

- Maurepas, France
- Monheim am Rhein, Germany
- Veszprém, Hungary
- Shamakhi, Azerbaijan
