= Metukim =

Israeli television series

- מתוקים
- Genre: Youth drama
- Created by: Assi Azar; Noa Gusakov; Yael Katz
- Starring: Rotem Sela; Amos Tamam; Assi Azar; Neta Orbach; Bar Brimer
- Country of origin: Israel
- Original language: Hebrew
- No. of seasons: 1
- No. of episodes: 13

Production
- Running time: 25 mins

Original release
- Network: HOT
- Release: January 29, 2023

Metukim (Hebrew: מתוקים) is an Israeli youth drama series created and written by Assi Azar, Yael Katz and Noa Gusakov for the HOT channel. The series follows the four orphaned brothers of the Tamari family, who run a pâtisserie. They face intense competition when a TV star, Tuli Devash opens a pâtisserie nearby. Tuli's mother, Shunit, goes to great lengths to bring down her rivals. The series stars Amos Tamam, Rotem Sela, Assi Azar, Bar Brimer and Neta Orbach.

Originally, the series' first-season premiere was scheduled to air on October 10, 2023, but due to the outbreak of the Gaza war, the premiere was pushed back to January 29, 2024.

On February 18, 2024, it was announced that the series was renewed for a second season.

== Plot summary ==
After their parents Miki (Kobi Maimon) and Ofra (Ann Konopny) were killed in a car accident, the brothers Eran (Nevo Katan), Roni (Noa Halfon), Amir (Ido Tako) and Mayan (Neta Carmeli) Tamri take on responsibilities at the pâtisserie that belonged to their parents together with their uncle, Boaz Tamari (Amos Tamam) and receive assistance from a welfare office employee Erez Karmi (Assi Azar). Opposite the pastry shop, a new pâtisserie called "Tollyland" is opened, owned by Tully Devash (Neta Orbach) and her mother Shunit Devash (Rotem Sela), the business is named after Tully who supposedly prepares the desserts, while the Devash family hides the truth that in fact the one who prepares everything is Tully's sister, Noam Devash (Adi Zemach).

Tully and Shunit are not happy with the fact that they have competition and try to oust them from the market. Noam, meanwhile, enters into a secret relationship with Amir Tamri from the rival family, and tries to stop her mother and sister from scheming against the Tamari family. Noam manages to convince Tully that it is wrong to harass the family.

Eventually, the Tamari family give in to Shoni and agree to sell their business after she blackmailed them. However, Tully confessed the secrets of Tullyland and apologized to the Tamari family, meaning that they no longer needed to sell their business.

== Cast ==
Tamari family

- Amos Tamam as Boaz Tamari - uncle of Eran, Roni, Amir and Maayan who moves in with them. Owner of a successful gaming company. He reconnected with his nephews after a 5-year rift because he fell out with his brother Miki, as Miki rejected him for being gay.
- Nevo Katan as Eran Tamri - the responsible and eldest brother of the Tamari boys, and the brother of Amir, Roni and Maayan. Hagar's ex-partner, and formerly Ido's best friend. At the end of the series, he forgives his father, and transfers the management of the pâtisserie to Roni.
- Shea Niv as Young Eran
- Noa Halfon as Roni Tamari - Amir's twin sister and Eran and Maayan's sister. She want to be a successful businesswoman. Former girlfriend of Ido, they break up when Eran discovers that Ido cheated on her with Hagar. She becomes the new manager of the pâtisserie at the end of the season.
- Romi Levian as Young Roni
- Ido Tako as Amir Tamari - the troubled brother of Eran, Roni and Maayan. Noam's ex-partner. They encountered difficulties in their relationship because of the families' rivalry. He broke up with them after he found out that she was the real "Tuliland" baker.
- Yonatan Horn as Young Amir Young Amir (Yonatan Horn).
- Neta Carmeli as Maayan Tamari - the younger sister of Eran, Roni and Amir. She is ostracized at her school due to a scar on her face following an accident.
- Ella Bok as Young Maayan
- Miki Tamari (Kobi Maimon) - the father of Eran, Roni, Amir and Mayan and the brother of Boaz. He was killed in a car accident. He is homophobic and conservative in his views.
- Ann Konopny as Ofra Tamari - mother of Eran, Roni, Amir and Mayan. She was killed in a car accident.

Devash family

- Neta Orbach as Tuli Devash - a successful TV star who opens a pâtisserie across from Tamari pâtisserie in an attempt to destroy the Tamari family business after moving to Kiryat Yam from Beersheva. She is Shunit's daughter and Noam's younger sister. At the end of the series she returns to Beersheva with her family.
- Rotem Sela as Shunit Devash - Tuli and Noam's scheming and manipulative mother that has a vendetta against the Tamari family. She will do anything for her daughter Tully to succeed. Her teacher husband left her when Tully was much younger and she lives on the divorce settlement and is not ready to return to her home city of Beersheva as a failure.
- Adi Zemah as Noam Devash - Amir's introverted partner who encounters difficulties in their relationship because of the families' rivalry. Tuli's older sister and Shunit's daughter. She is the real baker of "Tullyland".

Additional characters

- Assi Azar as Erez Karmi - a social worker from the welfare office who received a report from an anonymous source that the Tamari brothers live alone. As a child he was bullied by Boaz, who later becomes his partner.
- Tal Fried as Hagar - Eran's partner, who broke up with him at the beginning of the series. She is a surfing instructor and scouts. She wants to get back with Eran at the end of the first season after she breaks up with Ido, but he rejects her.
- Bar Brimer as Ido - Eran's best friend and Roni's partner, but cheats on her with Hagar. He has a history of cheating on his partners. At the end of the first season, he returned to his ex-girlfriend, Natalie.
- Shlomi Tapiaro as Dean - Boaz's business partner in the startup he is developing. At the end of the first season, Dean gets rich while Boaz gives up the start-up.
- Nava Medina as Ahuva - a successful baker whom Roni admires.
- Mia Ezer Stein as Natalie - Ido's ex-partner. Female singer of a rock band. She get back with Ido at the end of the first season.

== Reception ==
The first episode had the highest opening ratings for a youth series in Israel in the last two years.
