= Girl No. 60427 =

2022 Israeli short film

Girl No. 60427 is a 2022 combined action and animation short film (22 min.) written and directed by Shulamit Lifshitz (שולמית ליפשיץ), a graduate of the Ma'aleh School of Television, Film and the Arts, and animated by Uriel Berkowitz (אוריאל ברקוביץ'). It is a story of a girl who finds the diary of her grandmother, a Holocaust survivor. Hebrew language, English subtitles.

== Awards ==
- 2022: Live Action Film award in the 2022 Yugo BAFTA Student Film Awards
- 2023: Cordillera International Film Festival, USA, Winner: Best Director of a Short Film
- 2023: Cleveland International Film Festival, USA, Winner: Best Live Action Short Film
- 2024 Near Nazareth Film Festival, Israel, Best Student/Debut Film
- 2024: Best Short Film Award at the Atlanta Jewish Film Festival
