= Raymonde Abecassis =

Israeli singer and actress (born 1943)

- Also known as: Raymonde El Bidaouia
- Born: January 1943 (age 83); Casablanca, Morocco
- Genres: Moroccan chaabi and other popular Moroccan music
- Occupations: Singer and actress
- Years active: 1970s-present

Raymonde Cohen Abecassis, also known by her stage name Raymonde El Bidaouia, (Arabic: ريموند ابيكاسيس; Hebrew: ריימונד אבקסיס; born January 1943), is an Israeli singer and actress born in Morocco. She is mainly known for her acting in film and TV, her success both in Morocco and Israel with Moroccan popular songs and her contributions to the promotion of Moroccan diasporic culture in Israel.

== Biography ==
Raymonde Abecassis was born Raymonde Cohen in Casablanca in 1943 to a Moroccan Jewish family. After emigrating from Morocco to Israel in 1952 at the age of 18, and later living in Canada and France, she continued to speak and perform in Moroccan Arabic. Established in Israel together with her family, she initiated various initiatives aimed at preserving the Moroccan Jewish heritage, marginalized by the Israeli mainstream society. After losing her husband in a car accident, she raised her two sons and her daughter Yael Abecassis, who also became a movie actress.

Abecassis received her stage name "El Bidaouia" ("the Casablancan") after the city where she was born. She achieved popularity in Morocco in the 1970s as a singer of chaabi and malhun music. Best known for songs such as "Al Adama Ma Mannouch," "Attoumoubil," and "Idirha al Kass," many of which remain popular at Moroccan celebrations, she became one of the popular interpreters of the Moroccan chaabi repertoire. Her performances earned widespread recognition, including an invitation in 1981 along with Samy Elmaghribi to perform before King Hassan II at the royal palace. She also has performed songs by popular Moroccan musicians such as Nass El Ghiwane, Abdelwahab Doukkali, Naima Samih, and Ahmed El Gharbaoui. Further, she maintained a close artistic relationship with veteran Moroccan singer Haja El Hamdaouia, with whom she performed at the 2018 Andaloussiyat Festival in Essaouira.

In 1970 and again in 1987, Abecassis participated with her band at the Mimouna Festival in Jerusalem, a traditional Maghrebi Jewish celebration organized by immigrants from Morocco. Apart from celebrating this North African tradition in Israel, the festival was intended to bring different communities together and to achieve better knowledge of Mizrahi customs with a general Israeli audience. She also performed songs both in standard as well as in Moroccan Arabic with the Israeli Andalusian Orchestra in Ashkelon and Ashdod.

During the 1990s, Abecassis started acting for Israeli TV and cinema and founded a theatre troupe that performed in Moroccan Arabic. Some of her notable roles have been in the Israeli TV series Srugim and in the award-winning 2005 French drama film Live and Become, where she played alongside her daughter Yael Abecassis and French actor Roschdy Zem.

== Reception ==
Abecassis was named in a 2017 study about the cultural revival of the Moroccan diaspora in Israel as one of the "extremely popular singers [...] performing in Moroccan Arabic". Other well-known singers of Moroccan background named were Mike Karoutchi, Zehava Ben and Neta Elkayam. Commenting on the Moroccan diaspora's cultural production in Israel, the study noted its broad spectrum of artistic forms. According to the study, this expressed a sustained connection to Moroccan identity, contributed to the preservation of cultural identity among Israelis of Moroccan background and supported the livelihoods of artists through commercial cultural activities.

In 2020 Israeli actress and film director Yael Abecassis wrote and directed the documentary Raymonde El Bidaouia, a biographical film about her mother, showing both of them on a journey from Israel to biographically important places in Morocco. In February 2023, Abecassis gave an interview on the occasion of her 80th birthday to Israeli newspaper Maariv, where she talked about her continuing concert schedule, the success and failures in her life. Commenting on her ongoing popularity, she said:

"I’m surprised that people still want to hear and see me, because people don’t usually leave the house to see an 80-year-old singer singing familiar songs. I'm not Leonard Cohen" [...] “Half of my audience is no longer in this world, but there is a young generation that discovers me. People between the ages of 40 and 50, who were not born when I started my career, come to my performances in Morocco. It surprises me.”
