= Ma'aleh School of Television, Film and the Arts =

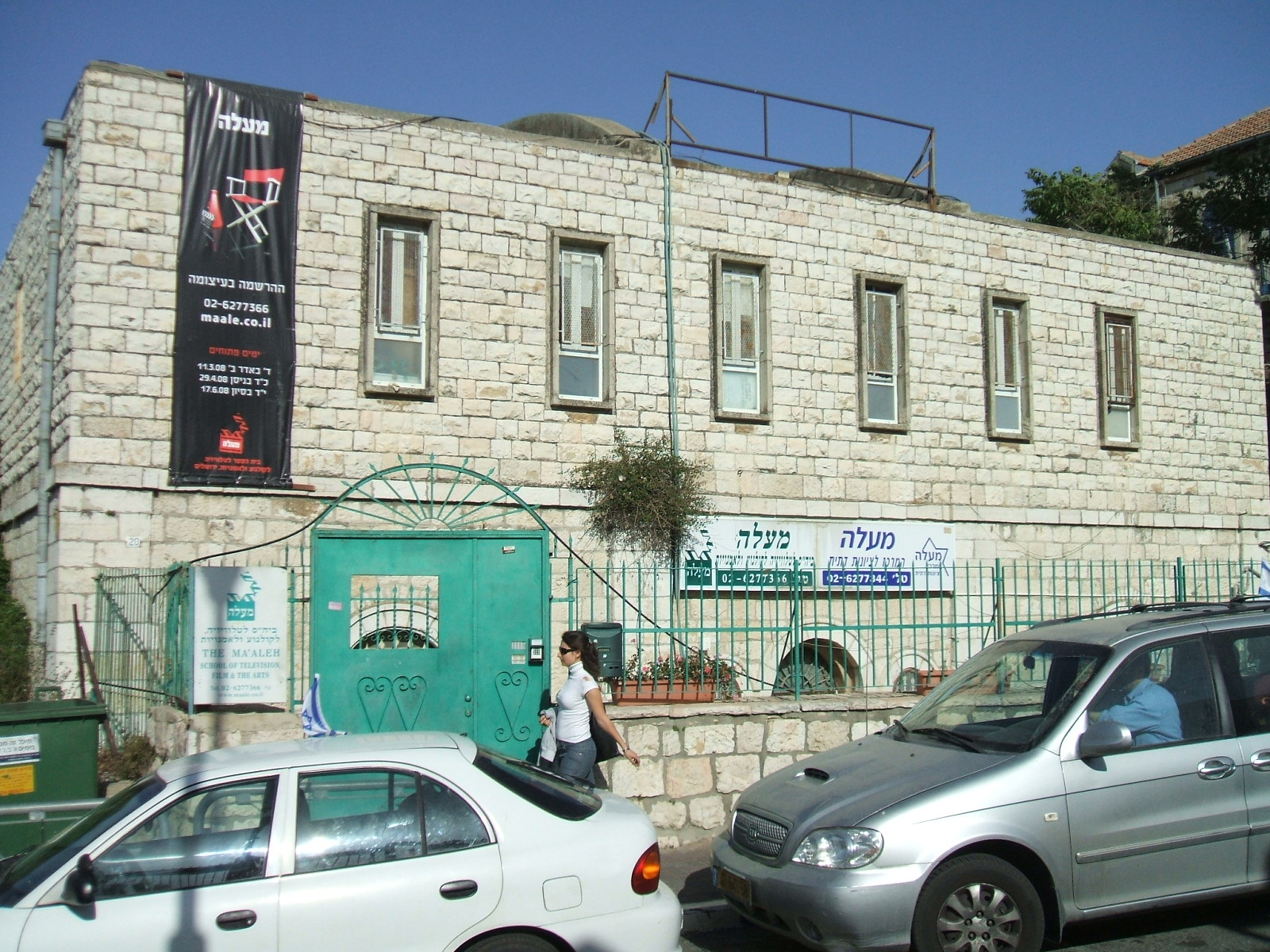
Ma'aleh School of Television, Film and the Arts

The Ma'aleh School of Television, Film and the Arts (in Hebrew: מעלה - בית הספר לקולנוע ולטלוויזיה), situated in a preserved stone building in the neighborhood of Musrara, Jerusalem, was founded in 1989 by Ma'aleh Association, with the aim of addressing the desire on the parts of national-religious Jews to learn media and film-related subjects.

Ma'aleh is an institution of higher education that trains filmmakers to produce work inspired by their Jewish heritage, fostering a unique connection between the world of media and Jewish culture. Maaleh is the only film school in Israel to ever win a BAFTA award. Since its establishment, hundreds of documentaries and short films have been produced, mostly addressing current events in the lives of Jews in Israel and Israeli settlements, and at times touching controversial topics as well, which have often sparked quarrels and disputes, for example following the production of the Haim Elbaum's feature film And Thou Shalt Love, which deals with the controversy of religious homosexuals in Israel.

Maaleh graduates have created some of Israel's most popular television programs: Shtisel, Srugim, Shababnikim, etc.

Groups visiting from North America, Europe, and Australia participate in Ma'aleh's film workshops. The school also boasts a number of social welfare programs that contribute to the welfare of the wider community.

For several years, Ma'aleh has run "Torah and Creation", directed by Rabbi Mordechai Vardi, wherein rabbis who view the graduates' films discuss the values and principles that the films raise.

Ma'aleh offers two main curricula: the Production and Directing curriculum and the Screenwriting curriculum. There is also a unique Track for Ultra-Orthodox Women.

Maaleh also uses film to enrich the lives of some of Israel's most marginalized populations, creating a first-of-its-kind VideoTherapy Program for at-risk youth, Ethiopian immigrants, terror victims and adults with special needs.

During the celebration of 18 years since its establishment, in 2007, a DVD album containing 18 of the best films created by Ma'aleh graduates was issued, and the best movie of all time, decided by film critics, was "Cohen's Wife" by Nava Hefets.

== Selected films ==
- Shabbos Mother
- Cohen's Wife
- Eicha
- Newspapers & Flowers
- Doda Dia
- Mousseiyoff 9
- Halel
- 782 Until Further Notice
- Singing through our Tears
- Tofu
- Evacuation Order
- The Orthodox Way
- Elyokim
- A-maiseh
- Saving Private Finklestein
- Another Day
- A Woman Laughed
- Addes
- Prisoner
- Girl No. 60427 (2022)
