= Shalom Asayag =

Israeli actor, stand-up comedian, producer, and TV host

- שלום אסייג
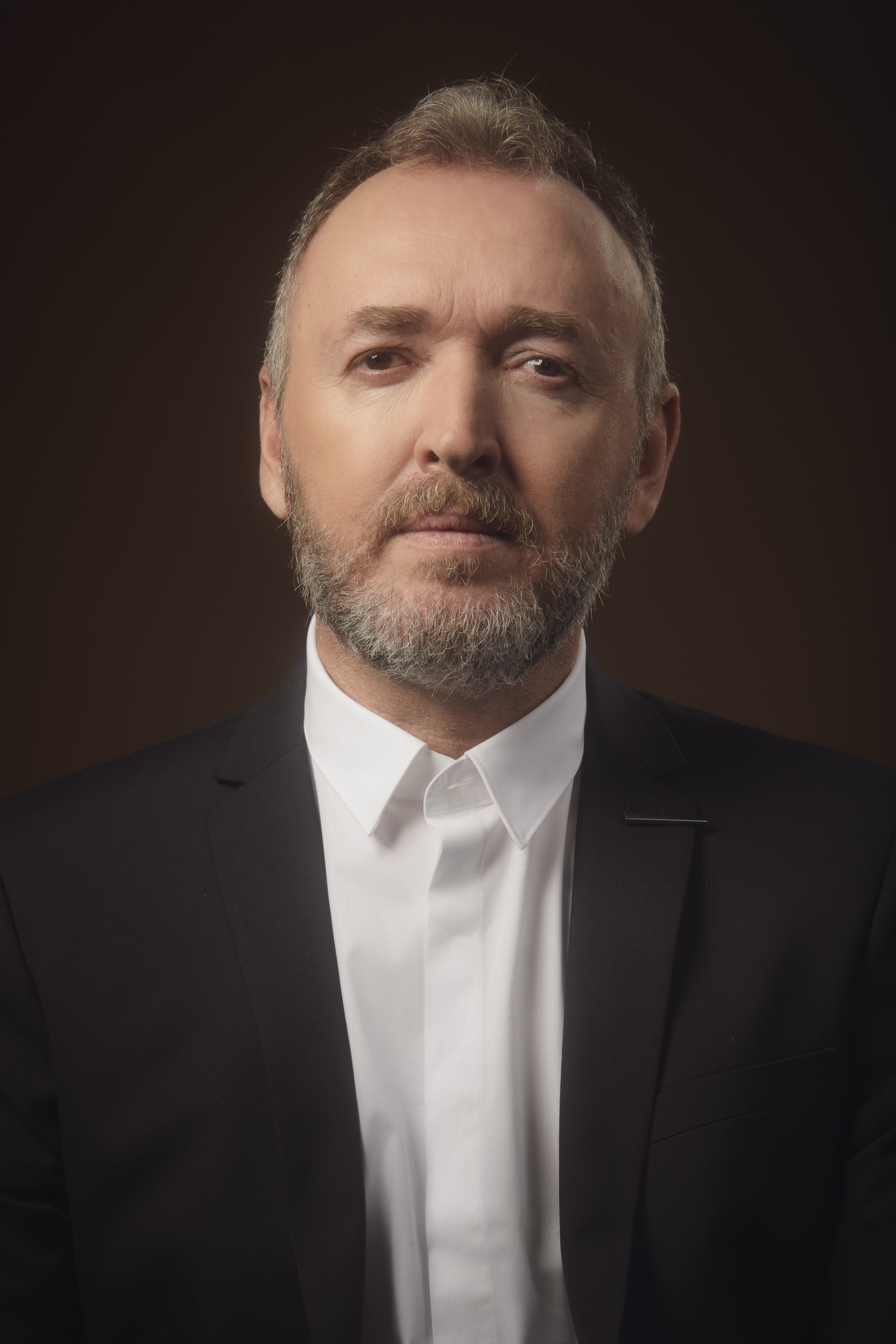
- Born: July 2, 1969 (age 56); Tirat Carmel, Israel
- Occupations: Actor, stand-up comedian
- Height: 1.92 m (6 ft 4 in)
- Children: 3, including Daniel Asayag
- Awards: Israel Television Academy Award (2021, 2023)

Shalom Asayag (Hebrew: שלום אסייג; born July 2, 1969) is an Israeli actor, stand-up comedian, producer, and TV host, best known for acting in the TV shows "Shnot HaShmonim", "Shnot HaTishim", and "Manayek".

== Biography ==
Asayag was born and raised in Tirat Carmel with a family of eight children, to Alice and Makhlouf, who immigrated to Israel from Morocco.

== Personal life ==
Asayag resides in Tel Mond, Israel. He is the father of one son, fellow stand-up comedian Daniel Asayag. He divorced Daniel's mother, Debbie, six months after Daniel's birth. From his second marriage to Irina Stein in 2013, he has a daughter and a son.

== Honors ==
In 2023 Asayag was honored as one of the torchbearers in the national Israeli Independence Day ceremony.
