= Israeli Television Academy Awards =

Annual awards for television production

- Prasey Ha'Academia Ha'Israelit Le'Televizia
- Awarded for: Best in television
- Country: Israel
- Presented by: Israeli Academy of Film and Television
- First award: 2003; 23 years ago
- Website: www.israelfilmacademy.co.il

The Israeli Television Academy Awards (Hebrew: פרסי האקדמיה הישראלית לטלוויזיה) are annual awards for excellence in the Israeli television industry, awarded by the Israeli Academy of Film and Television.

== History ==
Until 2003, awards were given during the Ophir Awards (Israeli Film Awards) ceremony. The Israeli Television Academy awards have been granted since the first ceremony in 2003, hosted by Yael Abecassis.

Since 2018, the ceremony has been broadcast on Kan 11.

From 2020 to 2021, the Best Comedy Series award was divided into Best Sitcom and Best Comedy Drama.

== Notable winners ==
- Eretz Nehederet has won the award 13 times, first as Best Comedy Series, and later as Best Entertainment Show, Best Satire Show, and Best Sketch Show. The show has also won awards for Best Makeup and Best Script.
- Assi Cohen has won the award eight times, both for Best Actor – Comedy Series and for Best Script.
- Keren Mor has won the Best Actress – Comedy Series award three times, all for Ktsarim.
- Sayed Kashua has won the Best Script award four times.
- Yehuda Levi has won the Best Actor award three times, in three different Drama categories.
- Alon Zingman has won the Best Directing award three times, for Shtisel and Manayek.

== Lists of winners ==
=== Best Drama Series ===
- Shabatot VeHagim (2003)
- Meorav Yerushalmi (2004)
- Ahava Ze Koev (2005)
- BeTipul (2006)
- A Touch Away (2007)
- Walk the Dog (2008)
- Srugim (2009)
- Prisoners of War (2010)
- Yellow Peppers (2011)
- 30 Shakh LeSha'a (2012)
- Shtisel (2013)
- Ish Hashuv Meod (2014)
- Fauda (2015)
- Uri ve Ella (2016)
- Fauda (2017)
- On the Spectrum (2018)
- Our Boys (2019)
- Manayek (2020)
- Alumim (2021)
- The Lesson (2022)
- Bad Boy (2025)

=== Best Comedy Series / Comedy Drama / Sitcom ===
- Shotetut (2003)
- M.K. 22 (2004)
- Eretz Nehederet (2005)
- Mummy (2006) (as Best Comedy Drama)
- Mesudarim (2007)
- Hakol Dvash (2008)
- Red Band (2009)
- Ramzor (2010)
- Arab Labor (2011)
- Arab Labor (2012)
- The Parliament (2013)
- The Parliament (2014)
- Killing Grandma (2015)
- My Successful Sisters (2016)
- Shababnikim (2017)
- Significant Other (2018)
- Nehama (2019)
- Chazarot (Best Comedy Drama) · Kupa Rashit (Best Sitcom) (2020)
- HaMefakedet (Best Comedy Drama) · Kupa Rashit (Best Sitcom) (2021)
- HaMefakedet (2022)

== See also ==
- Ophir Awards
- Television in Israel
