= Srugim =

Israeli television series

- סרוגים
- Genre: Drama
- Created by: Laizy Shapiro; Havvah Deevon
- Written by: Laizy Shapiro; Hava Divon; Ori Elon; Yishai Goldflam; Ilan Eshkoli; Shmuel Haimovich; Renanit Parshani; Yael Rubinstein
- Directed by: Laizy Shapiro
- Starring: Ohad Knoller; Amos Tamam
- Opening theme: Ana Efne
- Country of origin: Israel
- Original language: Hebrew
- No. of seasons: 3
- No. of episodes: 45 (list of episodes)

Production
- Executive producer: Eitan Abut
- Producers: Jonathan Aroch; Dikla Barkai
- Camera setup: Ram Shweki
- Running time: 40 minutes
- Production company: Abut-Barkai Productions

Original release
- Network: Yes Stars
- Release: June 23, 2008 – January 29, 2012

Srugim (Hebrew: סרוגים; literally, "knitted" or "crocheted") is an Israeli television drama that originally aired on Yes TV between 2008 and 2012. It was directed by Eliezer "Laizy" Shapiro, who co-created it with Havvah Deevon. The series depicted the lives of five Orthodox Jewish single men and women in their 30s who reside in Jerusalem. The title is a reference to the crocheted skullcaps worn by men of that segment of Israeli society. Srugim, which dealt with controversial issues in the Orthodox Jewish society in Israel, caused a public uproar within that sector.

The drama enjoyed high ratings, from both the religious and non-religious sects in Israel, as well as with American Jews. Many of the American Jews compared the issues of the characters in the show to those of the Upper West Side. The show won five Israeli Academy of Film and Television Awards.

In 2012 it was announced that the show would not be renewed for a fourth season.

== Plot ==
=== Season 1 ===
Yifat and Hodaya, who went to an all-girls school together, now share an apartment in Katamon, the hub of religious singles' social life in Jerusalem. Yifat meets Nati, a childhood friend who is now a doctor, and he introduces the two women to his roommate, Amir, a recently divorced teacher. Reut, an accountant who is also a religious feminist, joins their small band. The five are all Orthodox Jews, unmarried, and in their late twenties or early thirties; they must cope with a society that expects people to get married while young.

Yifat falls for Nati, who seems oblivious. When she confesses her feelings, he admits he knew it all along but does not reciprocate. Hodaya, who is becoming less pious, meets Avri, a secular archaeologist; they date, but Hodaya hides her religious lifestyle from him. Amir must deal with the stigma of being divorced, which hampers his chances to enter a new relationship; when he encounters his divorcée, Na'ama, their mutual loneliness leads them to have sex. They must divorce again in a Rabbinical court. Reut wants to chant the haftorah, and she convinces the initially reluctant Yochai to teach her. Though rejecting the notion of a woman chanting at first, he soon becomes enamored with her. When he cannot control himself and kisses Reut, he immediately proposes marriage. Unsure, she decides to keep dating him and sees another man simultaneously. Hodaya profanes the Sabbath for the first time in her life and then lets Avri drive her to the beach, where she tells him the truth.

Reut begins to lose interest in Yochai. Although intending to consummate her relationship with Avri, Hodaya flinches at the last moment, and she decides to end their romance, stating that the differences between them are too great. Tired of Jerusalem, Yifat moves to a quiet settlement. Amir begins visiting Yifat, and the two become close friends. Nati tries to approach her again, angering Amir. The two come to blows, but eventually they reconcile. Amir and Yifat decide to marry. After meeting up with her niece, who was evicted from Gaza and who consequently lost her faith, Hodaya resolves to disaffiliate. Reut breaks up with Yochai and goes on a long trip to India.

=== Season 2 ===
Season 2 began approximately six months after the conclusion of season 1. Amir and Yifat get married, and now must cope with the new hardships, including fertility problems and the need to observe ritual purity. Amir returns to his roots and begins praying in a Tunisian synagogue with an old man named Shmuel. He is frowned upon by his Ashkenazi environment. Nati's mother dies, and his brother Roi moves in with him. Reut returns from India after six months, after missing Amir and Yifat's wedding, as well as the wedding of her sister Elisheva, who is now pregnant. Reut begins to date Roi, only to have Roi later reveal that he is a homosexual, to Nati's surprise. Reut refuses to give up on him and continues to date him, however Roi eventually ends things. Nati falls in love with Dafna, a divorced mother who works in his hospital as a medical clown, though he leaves her after realizing he cannot cope with raising her son. Hodaya, trying to lead a secular lifestyle, works in a pub and meets Assaf, another formerly religious man, with whom she loses her virginity. She breaks up with him after discovering that he began practicing again.

=== Season 3 ===
Yifat finally becomes pregnant. Roi has turned ultra-orthodox and has an arranged marriage. Amir quits his job as a teacher, finds a new one as Reut's secretary and finally receives a lifelong tuition to study in a Yeshiva. Nati has a new roommate, a poet named Azaria, who was abandoned by his fiancée, Tehila. Nati falls in love with Tehila but cannot convince her to see him for she vowed to remain single until Azaria finds a new partner. Nati encourages Reut to date Azaria, who begins to exploit her for her money. After becoming drunk, he confesses that he does not love her and she abandons him. Tehila starts seeing Nati; he is finally ready to commit and proposes to her, and she seems to accept. Hodaya encounters Avri again. He cancels his own planned wedding and asks her to marry him instead. Hodaya backs off once more, just a few days before the ceremony, leaving him heartbroken. Amir becomes friends with a boy at his yeshiva and goes to work in a ranch in the Negev with him for a few weeks. Hodaya receives a radio show of her own, becomes stressed and quits. Yifat admonishes her for her constant wavering. Tehila speaks with Azaria, and informs Nati they decided to resume their relationship. Nati sinks into depression. Yifat delivers her baby prematurely; Reut and Hodaya stay with her while Nati drives off to fetch Amir. He must stay in the empty ranch while Amir drives back to Jerusalem. Reut comes to bring him back, and they both reconcile while staying in the desert. Hodaya, who heeded Yifat's words, gets her job back and reunites with Avri. Amir and Yifat prepare to take their newborn son home.

== Characters ==
=== Main ===
- Dr. Nethaniel "Nati" Brenner portrayed by Ohad Knoller
- Amir Yechezkel portrayed by Amos Tamam
- Yifat portrayed by Ya'el Sharoni
- Hodaya Baruchin portrayed by Tali Sharon
- Reut Rosen portrayed by Sharon Fauster

=== Recurring ===
- Chaya portrayed by Sara von Schwarze
- Dr. Avri Sagiv portrayed by Zohar Strauss
- Elisheva portrayed by Ma'ayan Weinstock
- Yochai portrayed by Moti Brecher
- Naama portrayed by Noa Kooler, Amir's ex-wife
- Roi Brenner portrayed by Uri Lachmi
- Ezra ben Atar portrayed by Yisrael Breit
- Tehila portrayed by Dikla Elkaslassy
- Asaf portrayed by Gal Pertziger
- Nati's father portrayed by Michael Warshaviak
- Nitzan portrayed by Yuval Scharf
- Dafna portrayed by Nati Kluger
- Shmuel portrayed by Uri Gavriel
- Vera portrayed by Raymonde Abecassis
- Chani portrayed by Shira Katzenelenbogen
- Faigi portrayed by Mali Levi
- Shani portrayed by Liat Harlev
- Stacy portrayed by Shira Katz
- Clumsy waitress portrayed by Alena Yiv

== Episodes ==
Series	Episodes	Originally released	
Series	Episodes	First released	Last released
1	15	23 June 2008	6 October 2008
2	15	10 January 2010	9 May 2010
3	15	23 October 2011	29 January 2012

== Production ==
Laizy Shapiro and Havvaah Deevon became acquainted while studying in the Ma'aleh School of Television, Film and the Arts. In 2005, the Gesher Multicultural Film Fund announced its intention to create a picture about religious-secular relations and held a contest for a script. Shapiro and Deevon submitted a treatment for a romantic comedy about a relationship between a bachelor living in Ramat Gan and a young settler from Hebron. Shapiro told her he had a similar idea already in his second year in Ma'ale, in 2000. Their entry was rejected, but they met Jonathan Aroch, a veteran producer, who served as their mentor during the competition. Aroch suggested they write another outline. Their second script concerned a religious single from Jerusalem named Nati, who is frustrated with dating and has resolved to give it only another year and then marry the first woman he encounters. This second entry was also declined. Shapiro and Divon returned to their regular jobs.

A year later, Aroch contacted both again, suggesting they make a television series about the religious singles scene in Jerusalem, the so-called "Katamon swamp" or "marsh". A real sociological phenomenon, the "swamp" is a large concentration of middle-class Orthodox men and women who remain unmarried at a relatively advanced age, a trend causing much strain in their society. Divon and Shapiro created a basic outline for a show, and conceived of the five main characters. They planned to name the series, Kovshei Katamon ("Conquerors of Katamon"), which is the name of one of the area's main streets and a reference to the neighborhood's "conquest" by members of the "swamp". The studios refused to accept the title. On 20 July 2006, Ma'ariv first reported about contacts between Aroch and the television companies of Keshet and Yes, concerning the future purchase of the series, labeled under the working title Sex v'ha'Ir haQdosha ("Sex and the Holy City"). It was reported that due to the high production costs expected, the companies considered broadcasting it first on satellite and later on terrestrial television, to ensure maximal revenues.

After Yes bought the rights, Aroch hired a group of screenwriters, many of them Ma'ale alumni and residents of the "swamp" themselves. Divon, Shapiro and their team wrote a full screenplay for a first season of fifteen episodes. Shapiro was also chosen to direct it. Auditions were held in September and October 2007. Towards the end of the second month, Aroch himself selected the final name of the show, Srugim – alluding to the crocheted skullcaps worn by national religious men, which distinguish them from other sectors. Principal photography was held in the winter of 2008. All studio filming was carried out in Tel-Aviv, but external photography occurred in Jerusalem and in Nofei Prat, which served as the fictional settlement to which Yifat moves.

The second season was shot in the summer of 2009. Principal photography for the third season began on 21 February 2010. In early May 2012, though the last season was considered the most successful so far, Shapiro and Divon announced they would not produce a fourth one, and the show was terminated.

In February 2010, the series began to air on The Jewish Channel in the United States.

As of 2017, all of the series is available on Amazon Prime.

== Reception ==
=== Awards ===
Year	Association	Category	Nominee(s)	Result
2009	Israeli Academy of Film and Television	Best drama series		Won
2009	Israeli Academy of Film and Television	Best script		Won
2009	Israeli Academy of Film and Television	Best actress	Ya'el Sharoni	Won
2009	Israeli Academy of Film and Television	Best actress	Tali Sharon	Nominated
2009	Israeli Academy of Film and Television	Best costume design	Seri Sobol	Won
2009	Israeli Academy of Film and Television	Best director	Laizy Shapiro	Nominated
2009	Israeli Academy of Film and Television	Best actor	Ohad Knoler	Nominated
2010	Israeli Academy of Film and Television	Best drama		Nominated
2010	Israeli Academy of Film and Television	Best script		Nominated
2010	Israeli Academy of Film and Television	Best director		Nominated
2010	Israeli Academy of Film and Television	Best actor	Amos Tamam	Nominated
2010	Israeli Academy of Film and Television	Best actor	Ohad Knoller	Nominated
2010	Israeli Academy of Film and Television	Best actress	Ya'el Sharoni	Nominated
2010	Israeli Academy of Film and Television	Best actress	Tali Sharon	Nominated
2012	Israeli Academy of Film and Television	Best drama series		Nominated

=== Reviews ===
When the show became available in the United States in 2014, Willa Paskin of Slate described it as the "Best TV show" of the year. Paskin wrote: "Srugim performs the magic trick of reviving the marriage plot, the narrative engine that powered everything from Shakespeare to Austen, but has lost much of its force now that marriage is no longer the only socially acceptable way to have sex. It is no longer a one-time only proposition from which one can escape only at the risk of the condemnation of parents, community, and God. But in the world of Srugim, that’s still exactly what marriage is—which gives a recognizable, realistic 21st-century TV show the stakes of a 19th-century novel."

Darian Lusk of The New York Observer also praised the series: "This show was one of the first — and maybe best — to fully portray modern orthodoxy on TV." Lusk continued: "What’s most impressive in Srugim is how these religious rules are used as a plot-driving arsenal. Sometimes for comedy, like not getting home in time from a one-night stand to do morning prayers. Other times, it’s to show us that underneath these traditions are deeply human characters."

Jeffrey Woolf, a Bar-Ilan University expert on Orthodox Jewish portrayals in the media, explains why this series has become popular not only with the secular "TV-watching" community, but also with many members of modern orthodoxy:

It's really the first time that the religious community has been represented in a non-stereotyped way on television.... Religious characters are usually cartoon-like in their superficiality, either because of malice or because of ignorance....

He claims that the show is important for both the religious and secular elements, because while many of the modern orthodox viewers can finally see characters with whom they identify, it offers secular viewers access to "an entire [religious] world that is normally inaccessible”.

A number of writers note that the phenomenon of a growing number of Jewish singles in the religious community is one factor in the show's popularity, because it is unprecedented in Jewish history, where marriages between religiously observant men and women traditionally occurred while both partners were young. Many reasons contribute to this change, including the financial ability of women to live on their own, rather than under the "protection" of their husband, but whatever the reasons, this change has created many new questions and challenges in their lives.

Yair Rosenberg writes in the Jewish Review of Books that the program has become an "Israeli pop culture phenomenon." However, while he agrees that the show has become extremely popular among members of both the religious and non-religious communities, there have been some detractors, including Rabbi Shlomo Aviner:

One prominent rabbi went so far as to place the show under a religious ban, citing the questionable conduct of various dati characters on the show. "There is bad language and licentiousness. It is not enough to be 'shomer negiah' [to observe the prohibition against touching someone of the opposite sex], and this is also not always followed [on the show]—one needs purity and modesty," he wrote.

The Jewish Week wrote that the show "is attracting a growing audience here in the States," and it is being discussed in many forums, including Facebook.

== See also ==
- For the Israeli need website, see: Srugim.co.il in Hebrew Wikipedia
