= Laizy Shapiro =

Israeli director and screenwriter

- אליעזר (לּייזי) מנחם שפירא
- Born: May 13, 1973 (age 53); Rehovot, Israel
- Occupations: Director, Screenwriter
- Years active: 2003–present

Eliezer (Laizy) Menachem Shapiro (Hebrew: אליעזר (לּייזי) מנחם שפירא; born 13 May 1973) is an Israeli director and screenwriter best known for the TV show Srugim.

Shapiro was born and raised in Rehovot, Israel, and in Karnei Shomron, the youngest of four children. His older brother, Joseph Shapiro, a senior army officer, married writer Tali Baragles Shapiro. Shapiro studied history at Hebrew University. He also led tunnel tours in the Old City of Jerusalem. During his studies, Shapiro lived in the Nahlaot neighborhood with his roommates Yuval, Hagi, and Itzik Strasberg.

In 2001 Shapiro was amongst the eighth graduating class of the Ma'aleh School of Television, Film and the Arts, a film and media school for Orthodox Jews. His graduation film "Lamentations", won the best film award at the Tel Aviv international student film festival. The movie is about settler girl named Eicha (Hebrew for Lamentations) who was born on Tisha B'Av. At eighteen she decides to change her name. Shapiro's television work is a combination of comedy and drama, subjects from the everyday life of young national religious sector, while staying neutral on ideological and political aspects.

Along with Chava Devon, who also graduated from Ma’aleh, Shapiro created a television drama series called Srugim ("knitted" in English), which was broadcast on Yes satellite network and later Channel 2. The show deals with the niche world of single Orthodox Jews in Jerusalem. Shapiro also directed and co-wrote the series. Srugim was shown in the U.S. on the Jewish Channel. It was named Best Drama by the Israeli Film and Television Academy.

Shapiro married actress Ronit Abrahamof and is a father of two.
