= The Jewish Channel =

Television channel

The Jewish Channel (TJC) was a cable television channel available on Comcast, iO Optimum Cablevision, Time Warner Cable, Verizon FiOS, RCN, Frontier Communications, and Cox Cable. It was launched by Compass Productions International in 2007. In 2011, the channel had around 45,000 subscribers. The Jewish Channel was added to Bright House Networks' digital lineup in July 2011. Shortly after TJC was created, they began a close relationship with The Jewish Daily Forward newspaper, which allowed TJC to provide programming directly related to headline topics. Other available programming is focused on Israeli culture, music, and history. TJC has also been referred to as the Jewish HBO, where the majority of programs are related to the cultural side of Judaism and less emphasis on the religious side.
