= Amos Tamam =

Israeli actor (born 1977)

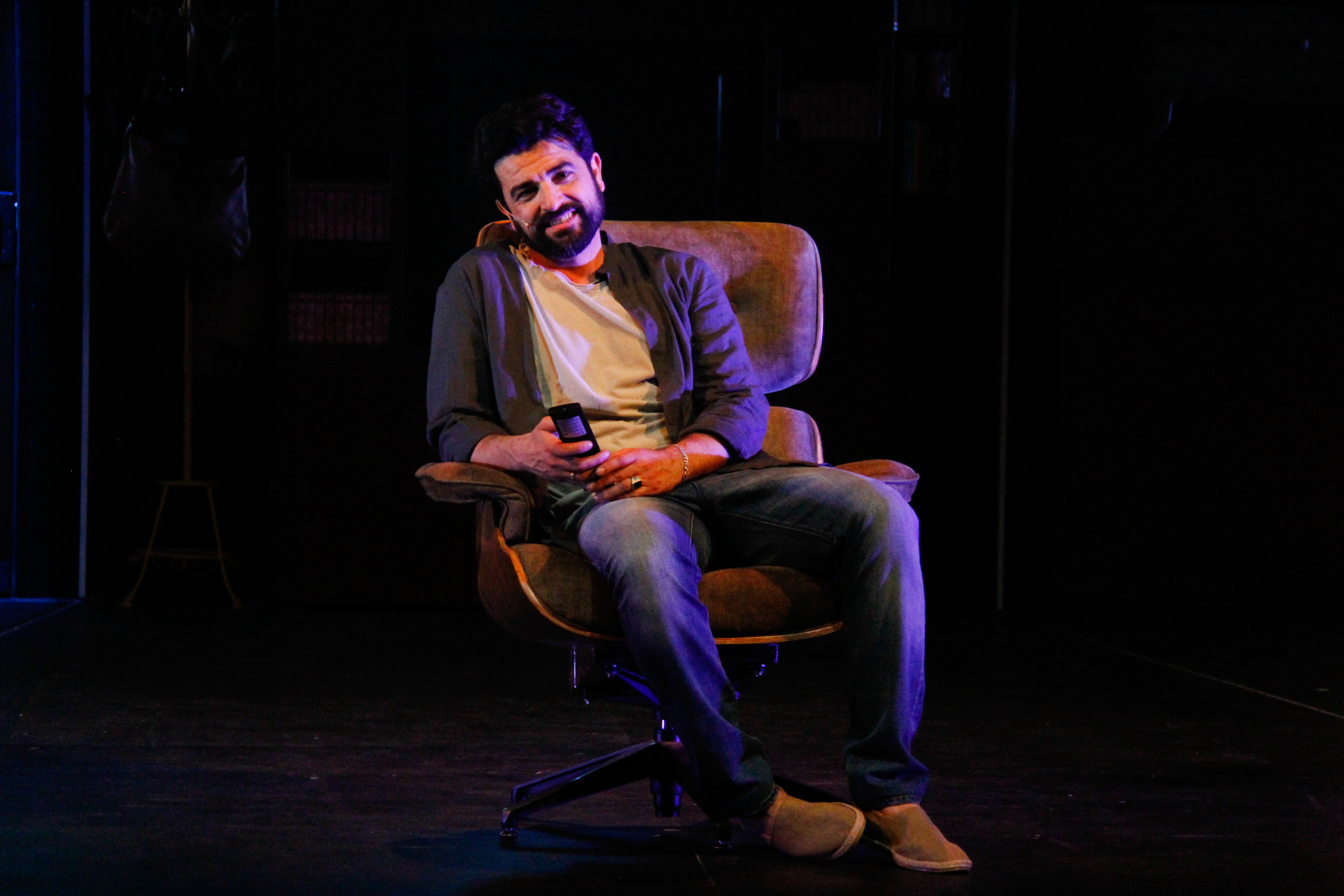
- Amos Tamam, photographed by Igor Zeiger for "The Genius" play
- Born: עמוס תמם; 6 September 1977 (age 48); Ramla, Israel
- Known for: Cinema, Theater

Amos Tamam (Hebrew: עמוס תמם; born September 6, 1977) is an Israeli film, television and stage actor. He is the recipient of three Awards of the Israeli Television Academy (2012, 2011, 2022).

== Biography ==
Amos Tamam grew up in Ramla in a traditional Jewish family of Tunisian descent.

Tamam served in the IDF as a fighter in the paratroopers' brigade.

== Career ==
=== Cinema ===
Tamam also participated in the film "Little Heroes" directed by Itai Lev. In 2006, he starred in "Three Mothers" (directed by Dina Zvi Riklis), "Nuzhat Al-Fuad" (directed by Jad Ne'eman), "A Movie of Wanderers" (directed by David Darzi and Maayan Rogel) and "Now or Never" ( TV movie on "Network").

In 2011 he starred in the movie "One Column to Dream". In 2013, he starred in the action film "Bayonet" directed by Emanuel Nakash.

In 2016, he starred in the lead role, Adi, in the film "Good Boy Jerusalem", a romantic comedy by Ran Appelberg directed by Roi Florentin, alongside Meital Gal Suissa, Mali Levy and Evelyn the Redeemer. That same year he starred in the film The Wedding Plan directed by Rama Burstein.

In 2017, he voiced the main character in the Hebrew version of the animated film "Ferdinand". In 2018, he appeared in the lead role in the film by Erez Mizrahi and Sahar Shavit "Halomim".

=== Television ===
In 2004, he began acting in the yes musical drama series - "Our Song", in which he played for two seasons. He also hosted the educational television program "Sabers - Read Will Succeed" to encourage reading among teenagers.

In 2007, he played a football player in the series "Mesudarim" on Channel 2 as part of "Rainbow Broadcasts". In 2008, he played the character of Amir, a young divorcee in the series Srugim ("Knitted") in Yes, and continued to appear in it in the second season (2009–2010) and the third (2011). In 2010–2011 he played with me in the series "Asfur".

In 2011, Tamm played the lead role in the Channel 10 action series "One Zero Zero" as cop Eric Arbel. In 2012 he played a lead role in the drama series "Strike" in yes. In 2013 he hosted the "Extreme Makeover" program on Channel 10.

In 2017, he began playing in HOT3's vampire series "Judah", which was created, written and starred by his friend from the days of "What's up", Zion Baruch.

In 2019 he started playing in the "dubbed" crime series, of yes. In the same year, he played in the series "Eli", in the role of Maurice Cohen, Eli Cohen's brother.

In 2020, he began playing in the suspense series "Manaich" on Channel 11 here, the character of Deputy Chief of Staff Barak Harel and as the Minister of Intelligence in the series "What Happened in Oslo".

In 2024 he stars as Michah Hadad alongside Ayelet Zurer in the Israeli drama series, The Best Worst Thing on Keshet 12. He also stars alongside Rotem Sela and Assi Azar in the Hot series, Metukim.

=== Theater ===
In 2005, Tamam acted in the play "Mezrich", directed by Itzik Weingarten at the Tzavta Theater and in the play "Sufa" directed by Yigal Ezrati at the Hebrew-Arab Theater. In 2006 he appeared in the entertainment show "The Galilee and the Lower", alongside actors Evelyn the Redeemer and Niv Raz. Since 2010 Tamam has been an actor in the "Cameri Theater": in 2010 he acted in the play "Havdalah", from 2012 he plays Casablanca in the new production of the theater, from 2014 he plays the character of "Stanley" in the play "Electric" called Passion "In a joint production of the Cameri Theater and the Habima Theater, on November 6, 2015 he began starring in the play" Lost Honor "alongside Ruthie Asarsai, Sarah von Schwartz and Micha Selector and from December 2016 Tamm plays" Nick Ernstein "in a" funny "musical starring Mia Dagan and directed by Mio Dagan French side. On Hanukkah 2017, he appeared in the children's musical The Three Musketeers and in the play Ismailia, in which he won critical acclaim.

Since 2018 he has been playing the role of Othello in the play "Othello" at the Cameri Theater and has received rave reviews for this role.

In 2019 he started playing "Closer" alongside Anastasia Payne who played alongside him in the series "Judah", Oz Zehavi and Andrea Schwartz who played alongside him in "Aspur".

Tamam is the presenter of the clothing company ML.

== Awards ==
- 2012: Best Actor in Dramatic Series. Israeli Academy of Television.

== Personal life ==
In September 2013, he married actress Tal Nerubai. In 2017, a daughter was born to the two, after their first child was stillborn a year earlier. The couple had a son in 2021. Amos has a brother Meir Tamam, who is also an actor.

== Filmography ==
Year	Title	Role	Notes
2004–2007	HaShir Shelanu	Yariv Arad	Series regular
2005	Achshav O Le'olam Lo		TV movie
2006	Shalosh Ima'ot (Three Mothers)		Film
2006	Giborim Ktanim (Little Heroes)	Police officer	Film
2007	Mesudarim	Shirazi	3 episodes
2007	Ha-Makom	Ilan	3 episodes
2008	Lemon Tree	Simon Hasson	Film
2008-2012	Srugim	Amir	Series regular S1, S2 & S3
2010-2011	Asfur	Itai	6 episodes
2011	Naor's Friends	Ron Hamburger	1 episode
2011	Nativ Damech Basheleg (The Trail of Your Blood in the Snow)	The Groom	Short film
2011-2015	Achat Efes Efes	Arik Arbel	Series regular
2012	One Draw to the Dream	Shabi	TV movie
2012	Shvita	Ya'akov Boskilla	Miniseries; 5 episodes
2013	Kidon		Film
2016	Yeled Tov Yerushalyim (Mr Predictable)	Adi	Film
2016	Beneath the Silence	Menashe Basson	Film
2016	The Wedding Plan	Shimi	Film
2017-2020	Juda	Asher	Series regular
2019	The Spy	Maurice Cohen	6 episodes
2019	Jarhead: Law of Return	Brodetsky	
2019–2022	Magpie	David Katz	Series regular
2020-2024	Manayek	Barak Harel	Series regular 30 episodes
2021	The Girl from Oslo	Arik	Series regular
2021	Legend of Destruction	Simon bar Giora (voice)	Film
2022	Virginity		Film
2024–present	Metukim	Boaz Tamari	Series regular
2024–present	The Best Worst Thing	Micha Haddad	Series regular
