= Israeli Academy of Film and Television =

Israeli film and television non-profit

- Founded: 1990
- Founder: Ricky Shelah
- Location: Israel
- Members: 750
- Website: www.israelfilmacademy.co.il

Israeli Academy of Film and Television is a non-profit organization working in the fields of film and television in Israel.

== History ==
The Israeli Academy of Film and Television, founded in 1990, is the Israeli equivalent of the US-based Academy of Television Arts & Sciences. In 2012, it had 750 members.

== Governance ==
The organization's board includes representatives of content creators, the film and television industry, representatives of local authorities and public figures. In 2012, the board was chaired by the producer Eitan Even and had 22 members.

== Awards ==
Each year the academy gives the Israeli Film Academy Award, known as the Ophir Award, for outstanding Israeli films.

From 2003, the academy added a separate ceremony for television, known as the Awards of the Israeli Television Academy.
