= Orly Silbersatz Banai =

Israeli actress and singer

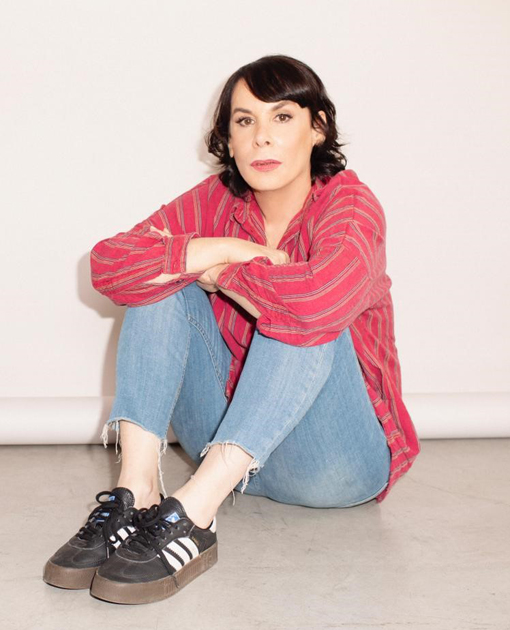

Background information
- Birth name: Orly Silbersatz
- Born: 11 December 1957 (age 67)
- Occupation(s): singer, actress
- Years active: 1978–present

Orly Silbersatz-Banai (Hebrew: אורלי זילברשץ-בנאי; born 11 December 1957) is an Israeli actress and singer. She has won two Ophir Awards and a prize from the Israeli Academy of Cinema and Television.

== Early life ==
Orly Silbersatz was born in Israel, to a secular Jewish family of Ashkenazi Jewish descent.

== Career ==
In 1978 she played the role of "Hohit" (חוחית) in the television program "Zehu Ze!", which soon became a cult phenomenon. In 1979 she appeared with Gidi Gov and Gali Atari in the movie Dizengoff 99. In 1988 she starred in Anat Gov's comedy series "So What?!" alongside Gidi Gov and Dov Navon. She has also written several songs for "Mashina", of which her ex-husband Yuval Banai is a member.

In 1994 she appeared in Eytan Fox's movie "The Siren's Song" alongside Yair Lapid. The role earned her an Ophir Award. In 1996 she starred in the film Saint Clara.

In 2000 she participated in the television series "Catching the Sky" (לתפוס את השמיים).

In 2002 she started alongside Maya Maron in the film Broken Wings. The film was submitted at film festivals in the United States and Germany (Berlin). The role earned her an Ophir Award.

In 2007 she started in the television program "Mishmoret" and "Taking Out the Dog".

She also appeared in the films Lost Islands (2008) and Intimate Grammar (2010) by Nir Bergman.

She played an important supporting role of Aliza, the yeshiva secretary, in the first two seasons of the hit television series ‘’Shtisel’’(2013-2016).

In 2020, she played the role of Noam's (Ran Danker) mother in Talya Lavie's comedy drama film, Honeymood.

In 2021, she played Dvori in Itai Segal's play, The One My Soul Loves at the Habima Theatre in Tel Aviv. She plays Dvori, a Modern Orthodox mother that refuses to accept her son Yehonatan's sexuality and convinces him to undergo conversion therapy. The play is also based on the true events of the Tel Aviv gay centre shooting and she stars alongside Amit Rahav, Daniel Litman and Yadin Gellman. She returned to the role for a special performance at Nicosia Municipal Theatre in Nicosia in Cyprus in October 2022 and then for a second run at Habima Theatre in December 2023.

== Personal life ==
Silbersatz and Israeli musician Yuval Banai married in 1987. They had three children, including the singer-actor, Elisha Banai. They divorced in 2007.

== Stage ==
Year	Title	Role	Venue	Ref.
2021	The One My Soul Loves	Dvori	Habima Theatre	
