= Eva Feiler =

English actress

- Education: Guildhall School of Music and Drama
- Occupation: Actress
- Years active: 2015–present

Eva Feiler is a British stage, screen and voice actress.

== Early life ==
She attended Redland High School for Girls in Bristol, followed by the Guildhall School of Music and Drama in London, where she won the Gold Medal for Drama in her final year.

== Career ==
=== Stage ===
Her stage roles have included parts in Othello (2015) and The Merchant of Venice (2015). In 2024, she could be seen starring as Joanna Baillie alongside Rachael Stirling in the premiere cast of April De Angelis play The Divine Mrs S. at Hampstead Theatre, directed by Anna Mackmin.

=== Television ===
She played a young Margaret Thatcher in series 4 of The Crown. Feiler also appeared in the Urban Legends season 1 episode The Girl in the Mirror and portrayed Joselyn O'Donnell in BBC One daytime crime series Father Brown.

She played Lucy in a 2023 Christmas special of BBC One series Beyond Paradise. She reprised the role for the 2024 and 2026 series.

She appeared in Hulu's 2024 holocaust series We Were the Lucky Ones. She played Bella Tatar, the girlfriend and childhood sweetheart of Amit Rahav's Jakob Kurc.

=== Voice acting ===
In 2020, she voiced Chloe in long running BBC Radio 4 series The Archers. She is the voice of Killjoy in the video game Valorant. She has also narrated audiobooks, including Warhammer horror audio drama Darkly Dreaming.

== Filmography ==
=== Television ===
Year	Title	Role	Notes
2016	Urban Legends	Gillian	Episode: "The Girl in the Mirror"
2017	Father Brown	Joselyn O'Donnell	Episode: "The Crimson Feather"
2020	The Crown	Young Margaret Thatcher	Season 4; episode: "48:1"
2023–2026	Beyond Paradise	Nurse Lucy Thompson	Recurring role; 6 episodes
2024	We Were the Lucky Ones	Bella Tatar	8 episodes

=== Video games ===
Year	Title	Role	Notes
2020	Valorant	Killjoy (voice)	
2024	Foamstars	(additional voice)	English version
2024	Funko Fusion	(additional voice)	
2025	Final Fantasy Tactics: The Ivalice Chronicles	Valmafra Lenande (voice)	English version
2026	Dragon Quest Monsters: The Withered World	Bianca (voice)	English version
