= Yadin Gellman =

Israeli film and television actor (born 1993)

- ידין גלמן
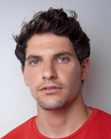
- Born: 2 October 1993 (age 33); Baka, Jerusalem, Israel
- Citizenship: Israeli; American; Canadian
- Occupations: Actor; model

Yadin Gellman (Hebrew: ידין גלמן; born 2 October 1993) is an Israeli film, television and stage actor and model. He was the first celebrity Israeli victim of the October 7 attack, sustaining serious injuries amid the Be'eri massacre. Through his parents he is also a citizen of the United States and Canada.

He has starred in films such as Image of Victory (2021) and Victory (2023). He is scheduled to star in Now More Than Ever, an Israeli romantic comedy produced by Amy Schumer and inspired by his own life after surviving October 7.

In 2021, he starred alongside Amit Rahav in Habima Theatre's stage production The One My Soul Loves, which was inspired by the 2009 Tel Aviv gay centre shooting.

== Early life ==
Gellman was born and raised in the Jerusalem neighborhood of Baka in Israel. His Jewish parents are Religious Zionists from Canada and the United States, and he is the youngest of four children. His mother, Karyn, runs an art gallery in Jerusalem and his father is a lawyer.

As a conscript in the Israel Defense Forces, he served as a fighter, officer and commander in the IDF special forces unit Sayeret Matkal. After his service, he became secular, moved to Tel Aviv and enrolled in the Yoram Loewenstein Performing Arts Studio.

== Career ==
His first screen role was as a series regular in the Israeli teen drama, Rising about pre-1948 life in the country, where he appeared alongside Yuval Segal.

In 2020, he was cast as Palmach commander Avraham in Avi Nesher's War of Independence drama film, Image of Victory. He drew praise for his performance, and during production, Nesher requested that he show the cast how to handle firearms. The following year he starred in an acclaimed teen-drama series, Palmach - Rising, about young recruits in the Palmach.

In 2021, he starred alongside Amit Rahav and shared the role of Adam with Daniel Litman in Itai Segal's play The One My Soul Loves at the Habima Theatre. The play is based on the true events of the Tel Aviv gay centre shooting and deals with conversion therapy. He returned to the role for a special performance at Nicosia Municipal Theatre in Nicosia in Cyprus in October 2022.

In 2023, he played Shlomo Harlap, reuniting with Litman, in the Israeli musical film Victory, set after the Six-Day War.

In 2024, he began starring alongside Michael Aloni and Lucy Ayoub in the military intelligence series, 8200. In the same year, Arugam Bay, a film he stars in, about young Israelis that travel to Sri Lanka to deal with wartime trauma.

In May 2025, it was announced that he would be starring in a new Israeli romantic comedy, Now More Than Ever, produced by Jewish American actress, Amy Schumer and directed by Eliran Peleg. The script is inspired by Gellman's own story of survival from October 7. It follows the journey of an injured Israeli soldier (Gellman) who rises to fame as a national hero and is sent on a public diplomacy (Hasbara) mission to New York City. There, he's paired with a Jewish American escort who’s so fed up with talk of Israel and Zionism that she’s on the verge of joining the demonstrations against him herself.

In late 2025, he began starring in Metallists for yes, alongside Bar Brimer. The comedy series, created by Eran Zerhovich, is inspired by his military service with Sayeret Matkal. Gellman plays Hagai, the team commander.

In 2026, he began filming the third installment of Matchmaking, taking on a Haredi role alongside Niv Sultan. He was also recently cast in the upcoming drama series, When the Waves Grow Stronger, based on the novel of the same name by Sharon Zohar. Gellman plays the role of a senior officer in the naval commando unit of the Israeli Navy.

He is also a model, and in 2024 appeared in a new campaign for Renuar.

== Filmography ==
| Year | Title | Role | Notes |
|---|---|---|---|
| 2021 | Palmach - Rising | Daniel Fleming | 30 episodes |
| 2021 | Image of Victory | Commander Avraham | Film |
| 2024 | Victory | Shlomo Harlap | Film |
| 2024 | Arugam Bay | Gal | |
| 2024 | 8200 | | 8 episodes |
| 2024 | Checkout | Niv Maimoni | 1 episode |
| 2025 | Hezi & Sons | Oz | 3 episodes |
| 2025 | Tomchi | | Short film |
| 2025–2026 | Matkalistim | Hagai | 8 episodes |
| 2026 | Matchmaking 3 | | Film |
| 2026 | When the Waves Grow Stronger | Harel Shai | 64 episodes |
| TBA | Now More Than Ever | | |

== Stage ==
| Year | Title | Role | Venue | Ref. |
|---|---|---|---|---|
| 2021 | The One My Soul Loves | Adam | Habima Theatre | |

== Personal life ==
Through his parents, he is also a citizen of the United States and Canada.

In 2023 he got engaged to Israeli news anchor, Adva Dadon.

Amid the October 7 attacks on Israel, he was one of the first soldiers, as an officer with the Special Forces to enter Kibbutz Be'eri, which had been infiltrated by Hamas and was the scene of the Be'eri massacre. He and other soldiers saved the lives of many families on the kibbutz. The soldiers were outnumbered by Hamas and Gellman sustained gunshot wounds to his chest, hand and leg. Amid his recovery he has been on speaking engagements in the United States, including Harvard Law School, to share his experiences.
