= The One My Soul Loves =

- Hebrew-language original poster
- Original language: Hebrew
- Written by: Itai Segal
- Subject: Tel Aviv gay centre shooting conversion therapy
- Genre: Drama
- Setting: Israel

Premiere
- Date: 25 December 2021
- Place: Habima Theatre

The One My Soul Loves (Hebrew: את שאהבה נפשי) is a play by Israeli playwright and writer Itai Segal, which premiered at the Habima Theatre on 25 December 2021. It was brought together by Habima and Tel Aviv-Yafo Municipality’s “Future of the Theater” project.

The play was inspired by the Tel Aviv gay centre shooting in a youth bar and also deals with conversion therapy, homophobia and hate crimes. The cast also traveled overseas to perform the play at theatre festivals in Cyprus and Romania.

The play includes the actors Amit Rahav, Daniel Litman, Orly Silbersatz Banai, Yadin Gellman and Naya Bienstock.

== Synopsis ==
A Modern Orthodox mother, Dvori (Silbersatz Banai) receives a late-night call about her 17-year-old son, Yehonatan (Rahav/Arenson/Mosheiov). He is in a hospital bed in Central Israel, seriously injured from wounds he sustained from the Tel Aviv gay centre shooting at Bar Noar.

Yehonatan is unconscious and his mother does not understand what her presumably heterosexual son was doing at Bar Noar. He unwittingly has to come out to his family once he is conscious. His father, Aharon (Sade/Geva) is accepting of his son's sexuality. However, Dvori refuses to accept the truth and convinces Yehonatan to undergo conversion therapy.

== Cast ==
- Amit Rahav/Avraham Arenson/Ran Mosheiov as Yehonatan
- Daniel Litman/Yadin Gellman as Adam
- Yigal Sade/Danny Geva as Aharon
- Orly Silbersatz Banai as Dvori
- Naya Bienstock as Tamar
- Uri Hochman/Oded Leopold as Rabbi
- Amos Buaron/Nadav Shama as Policeman
- Amit Zittoun/Michal Brand as Nurse
- Ofek Zarko, Dor Galula, Yogev Atias, Yoni Kruvi as ensemble

== Background ==
Segal initially envisaged the project as a short film, focusing on a mother in the hospital waiting room after the Noar Bar attack. Upon meeting the director, Moshe Kepten, Segal realized that the forced revelation of the son's sexuality could develop into an expanded story for the theatre. Segal and Kepten were both troubled by the issue of conversion therapy and decided to use it as part of the story around the bar attack.

Set designer, Eran Atzmon uses a minimalist stage set that is largely empty and white. There is a hanging box and video clips are projected onto the white floor. There are four chairs on stage. The aim was for the audience to feel more immersed and active in the play and not to feel too relaxed.

== Productions ==
The play premiered at Habima Theatre in December 2021.

In October 2022, Habima brought the production to Nicosia Municipal Theatre in Nicosia in Cyprus. The performance was supported by the Embassy of Israel in Cyprus. The play was chosen to open the Nicosia International Festival. The performance and reception were attended by Cypriot Deputy Minister of Culture Mr Yiannis Toumazi and the Israeli Ambassador in Israel, Oren Anolik.

In June 2023, Habima brought the play to Romania, where it was part of the Sibiu International Theatre Festival.

Performances resumed for a second run at Habima Theatre in December 2023. Litman played the role of Adam throughout. He explained to audiences that Yadin Gellman, whom he shared the part with, was unavailable to attend due to medical reasons. Gellman was recovering from gunshot wounds from the October 7 attacks amid the Be'eri massacre.

== Reception ==
Haaretz wrote that the play is "still very relevant, the writing is convincing, the direction is sensitive and above all the acting of Amit Rahav stands out. The humane message of "You One My Soul Loved" is conveyed in a detailed and optimistic manner."

Mako praised the play as "rare and very exciting", adding that the play is "still essential for many who do not really know the struggle, and do not really remember the bloody wound that is the shooting in Bar Noar". Mako also praised the direction of Moshe Kepten and casting, particularly the performance of Silbersatz Banai.
