= Jon Ehrlich =

Television and film composer

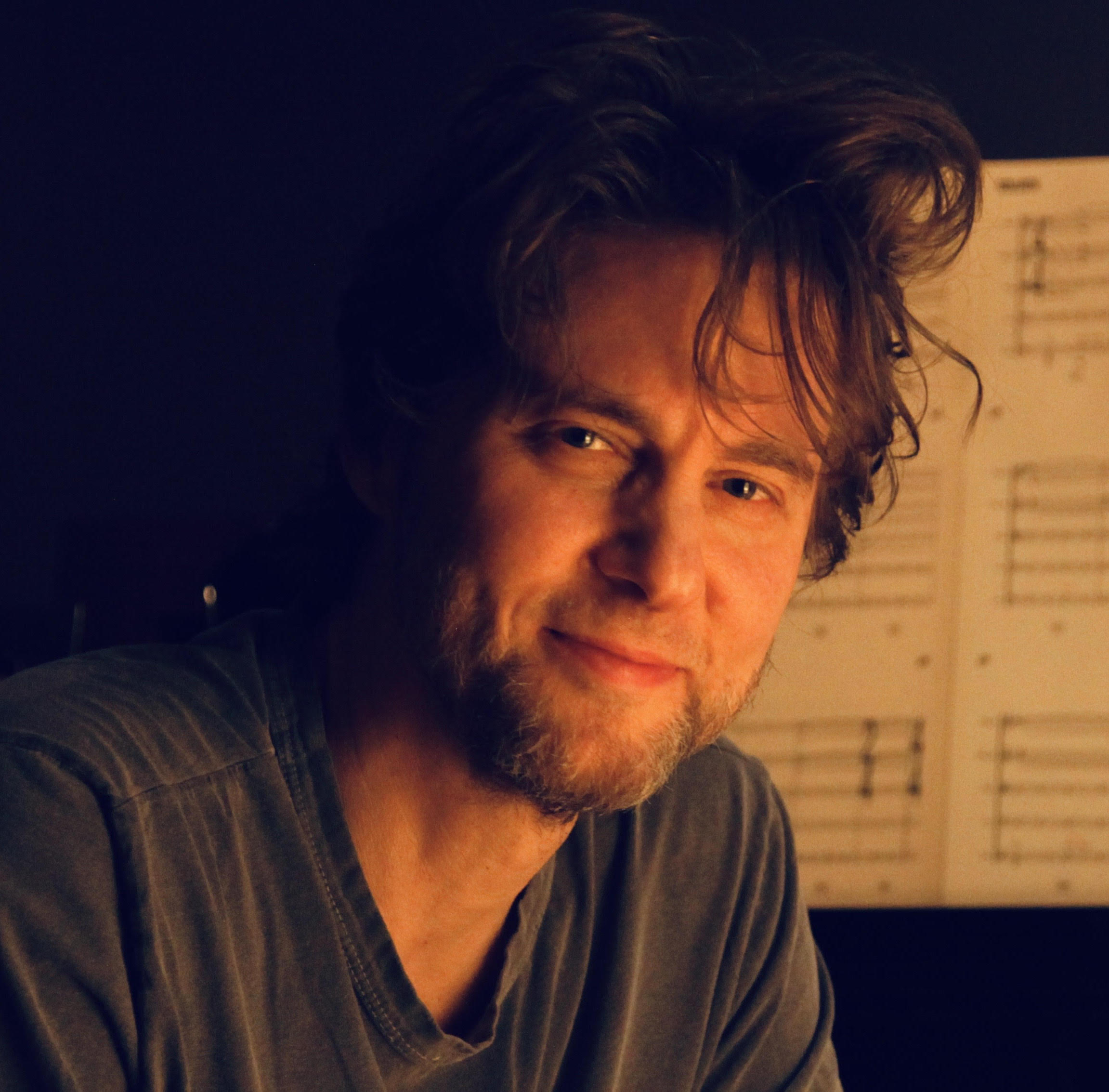

Background information
- Genre: Film score
- Occupations: Television, film composer
- Website: Jon Ehrlich

Jon Ehrlich is a three-time Emmy-nominated TV and film composer. His primetime Emmy nominations in the Music Composition for a Series category came in recognition for his work on House, M.D., starring Hugh Laurie, The Agency, starring Beau Bridges, and Roar, starring Heath Ledger. His score for Ask Me Anything, starring Martin Sheen, won Best Music in a Feature Film at the Nashville Film Festival.

In 2025 he received an International Film Music Critics Association nomination alongside Rachel Portman recognizing their critically acclaimed score for Hulu’s Holocaust drama limited series, We Were the Lucky Ones, from director Tommy Kail and writer Erica Lipez, starring Logan Lerman and Joey King. The score has been singled out in reviews such as IndieWire’s The Best TV Scores of 2024: “The music here is wise enough not to try to be more intense than the events that the Kurc family goes through over the course of the Hulu limited series. Instead, the score is often a quiet, insistent source of strength and emotional catharsis that the characters cannot allow themselves to show but that we get to feel. Portman and Ehrlich’s work transitions from being as wistful and painful as memories to being as relentless as whatever inner fortitude helps the characters survive — and back again. The result is a musical experience that matches the poignancy of the series.”

Other notable credits include: Amazon’s Goliath, from director Lawrence Trilling, starring Billy Bob Thornton, William Hurt, Dennis Quaid, and J.K. Simmons; The Resident, starring Matt Czuchry; Parenthood, created by Jason Katims, starring Peter Krause, Lauren Graham, Dax Shepard, and Craig T. Nelson; About a Boy, created by Jason Katims, starring Minnie Driver; The Slap, developed by Walter Parkes, directed by Lisa Cholodenko, starring Brian Cox, Lucas Hedges, Peter Sarsgaard, and Uma Thurman; Life, starring Damian Lewis; White Collar, starring Matt Bomer; Graceland, starring Aaron Tveit; Invasion, created by Shaun Cassidy; Pitch, created by Dan Fogelman and Rick Singer; Karen Sisco, created by Elmore Leonard; The Guardian, starring Simon Baker; Golden Globe Award-winning Party of Five, starring Neve Campbell and Scott Wolf; and, Time of Your Life, starring Jennifer Love Hewitt and Jennifer Garner.

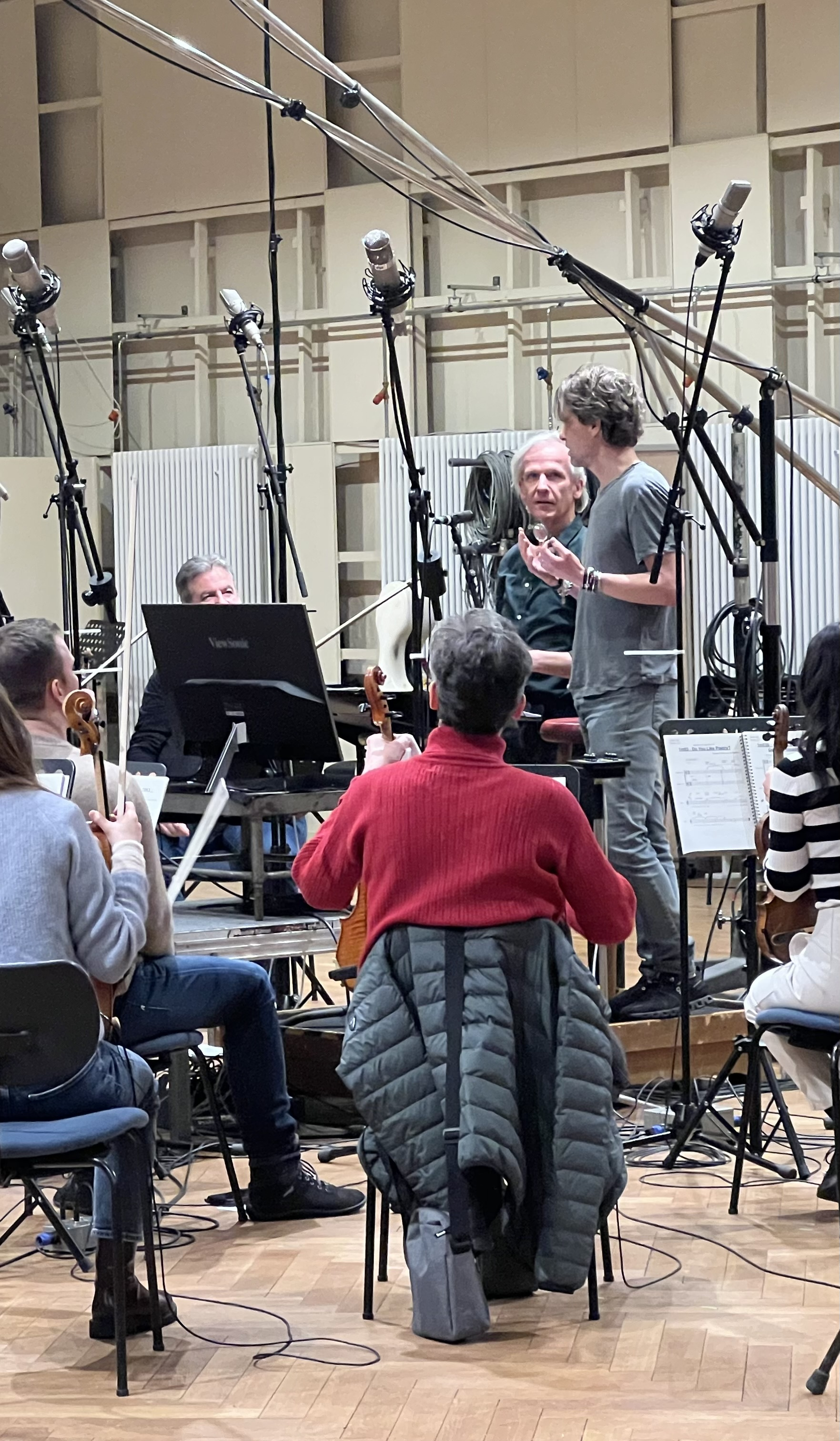
Scoring sessions at Teldex in Berlin for We Were the Lucky Ones.

== Early years ==
Ehrlich was born in New York City, and grew up in Brooklyn and New Jersey. He studied music and theater as an undergraduate at Yale University, where he wrote two musicals and graduated as a Scholar of the House. He furthered his studies in film scoring at the USC Screen Scoring Program, studying with Jerry Goldsmith, David Raksin, and Buddy Baker. Ehrlich began his career performing on Broadway and writing musicals, and started at Warner Bros. Feature Animation, writing a musical film titled The Jester with collaborator Stephen Lloyd.

== Other work ==
Jon is also a founder of the software company Qwire.

== Filmography ==
Film
Year	Film	Notes
1996	Paul Monette: The Brink of Summer's End	
1998	Blossoms and Veils	
2007	Flakes	
2014	Ask Me Anything	
2015	Billions in Change	
2015	Silent War	
2020	Rinse & Repeat	
Television
Year	Title	Notes
1994	Dead at 21	6 episodes
1997–1998	Frontline	3 episodes
1997	Roar	13 episodes
1998–1999	Mercy Point	7 episodes
1998–2000	Party of Five	49 episodes
1999–2001	Time of Your Life	19 episodes
2000–2001	Cover Me: Based on the True Life of an FBI Family	25 episodes
2001–2003	The Agency	45 episodes
2001–2004	The Guardian	67 episodes
2002–2003	Baby Bob	14 episodes
2003	Tarzan	8 episodes
2003–2004	Karen Sisco	10 episodes
2004	Hawaii	7 episodes
2004–2005	The Mountain	13 episodes
2004–2005	Tru Calling	26 episodes
2004–2012	House	176 episodes
2005	Bound for Glory	8 episodes
2006	Waterfront	5 episodes
2006	Misconceptions	7 episodes
2005–2006	Invasion	22 episodes
2006	Conviction	13 episodes
2007–2009	Life	32 episodes
2008	Women's Murder Club	4 episodes
2009–2014	White Collar	81 episodes
2010	Past Life	1 episode
2010–2015	Parenthood	103 episodes
2012	Ruth & Erica	13 episodes
2013–2015	Graceland	38 episodes
2014–2015	About a Boy	33 episodes
2015	The Slap	8 episodes
2016	Pitch	10 episodes
2016	Heartbeat	10 episodes
2016	Recovery Road	10 episodes
2016–2021	Goliath	32 episodes
2017	APB	12 episodes
2018–2023	The Resident	107 episodes
2020	Party of Five	10 episodes
2023	We Were the Lucky Ones	Miniseries (8 episodes)

== Discography ==
- We Were the Lucky Ones (Original Soundtrack)
- Goliath (Amazon Original Series Soundtrack)
- The Slap (Original Television Soundtrack)
- Invasion (Original Soundtrack)

== Award Nominations ==
Year	Award	Result	Category	Series
1998	Emmy Award	Nominated	Outstanding Music Composition for a Series (Dramatic Underscore)	Roar (For the pilot episode)
2003	Emmy Award	Nominated	Outstanding Music Composition for a Series (Dramatic Underscore)	The Agency (Shared with Jason Derlatka for "The Great Game" episode)
2008	Emmy Award	Nominated	Outstanding Music Composition for a Series (Original Dramatic Score)	House (Shared with Jason Derlatka for the "Guardian Angels" episode)
2025	International Film Music Critics Association	Nominated	Best Original Score for a Television Series (Limited Series)	We Were the Lucky Ones (Shared with Rachel Portman)
