= Niv Sultan =

Israeli actress

- ניב סולטן
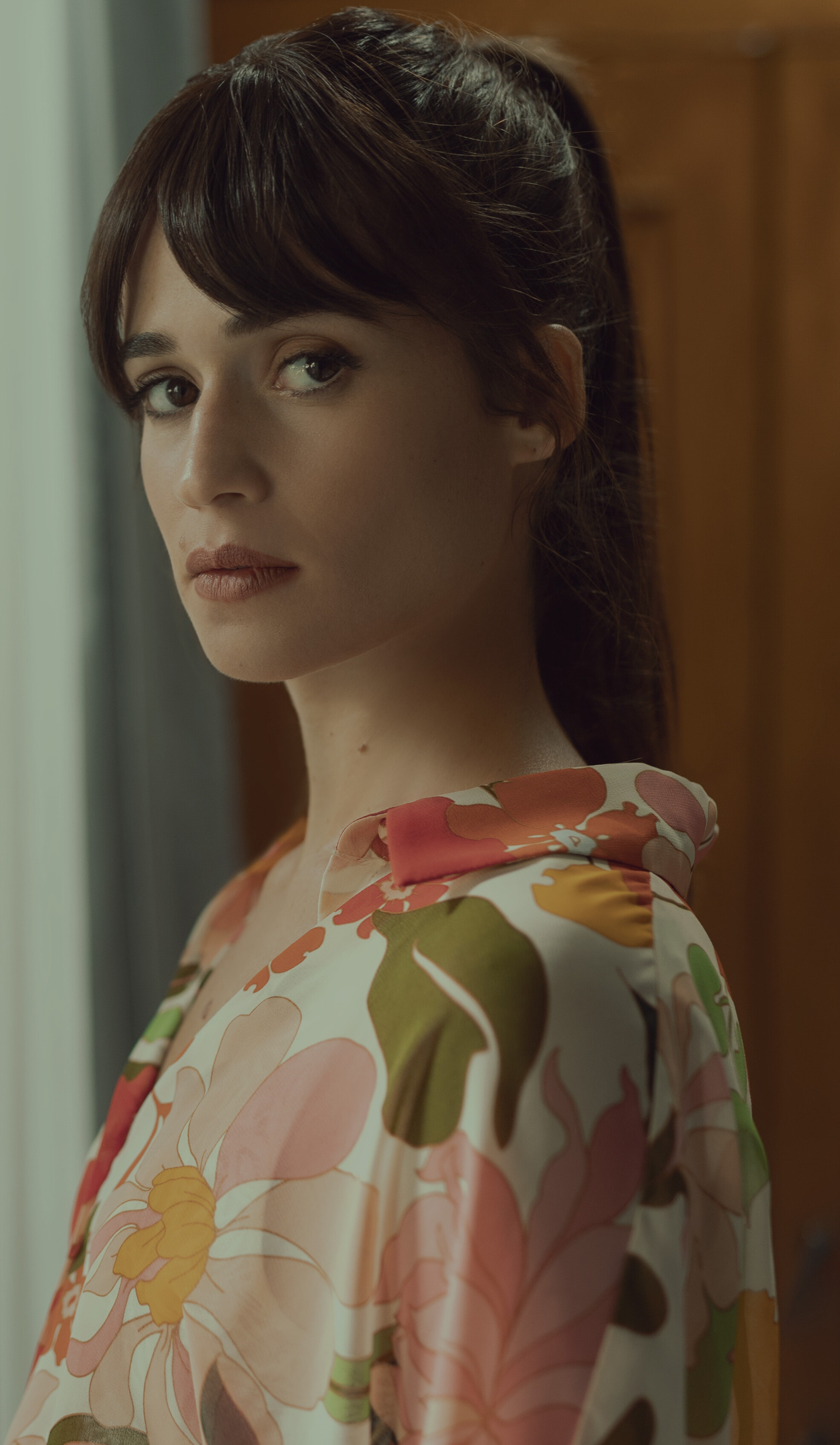
- Sultan in 2022
- Born: September 16, 1992 (age 34); Jerusalem, Israel
- Education: Yoram Loewenstein Performing Arts Studio
- Occupations: Actress, entrepreneur
- Years active: 2017–present
- Notable work: Tehran; That Dirty Black Bag
- Spouse: Maor Schweitzer (m. 2022)
- Awards: Israeli Television Academy Award for Best Actress in a Drama Series (2020)

Niv Sultan (Hebrew: ניב סולטן; born 1992 is an Israeli actress. She is best known for starring as a Mossad hacker-agent undercover in Iran in Tehran, an Israeli espionage thriller television series that premiered in 2020 on Apple TV+ and Kan 11. Her performance earned her the Israeli Television Academy Award for Best Actress in a Drama Series in 2020.

Born and raised in Jerusalem, Sultan began her professional acting career in 2013. She studied at the Yoram Loewenstein Performing Arts Studio. Sultan is also an entrepreneur, who co-owns the jewelry brand Sultana.

== Early life and education ==
Niv Sultan was born in 1991 or 1992 Jerusalem, Israel, to a family of Moroccan Jews.

After completing her compulsory military service, she attended acting classes for three years at Yoram Loewenstein Performing Arts Studio in Tel Aviv. As a student, she participated in the institution's production of A View from the Bridge by Arthur Miller; Sultan assumed a lead role as Catherine, opposite her classmate Tomer Machloof.

== Career ==
Between 2015 and 2017, Sultan starred in the Israeli family sitcom La Famiglia on Channel 10. In 2016, she had a regular role alongside Amit Rahav and Daniel Gad in the Israeli youth drama series Susey Pere (Wild Horses) on the TV channel Zoom. In 2017, she starred alongside Omer Dror and Noa Kirel in the Israeli teen comedy Kimaat Mefursemet (Almost Famous).

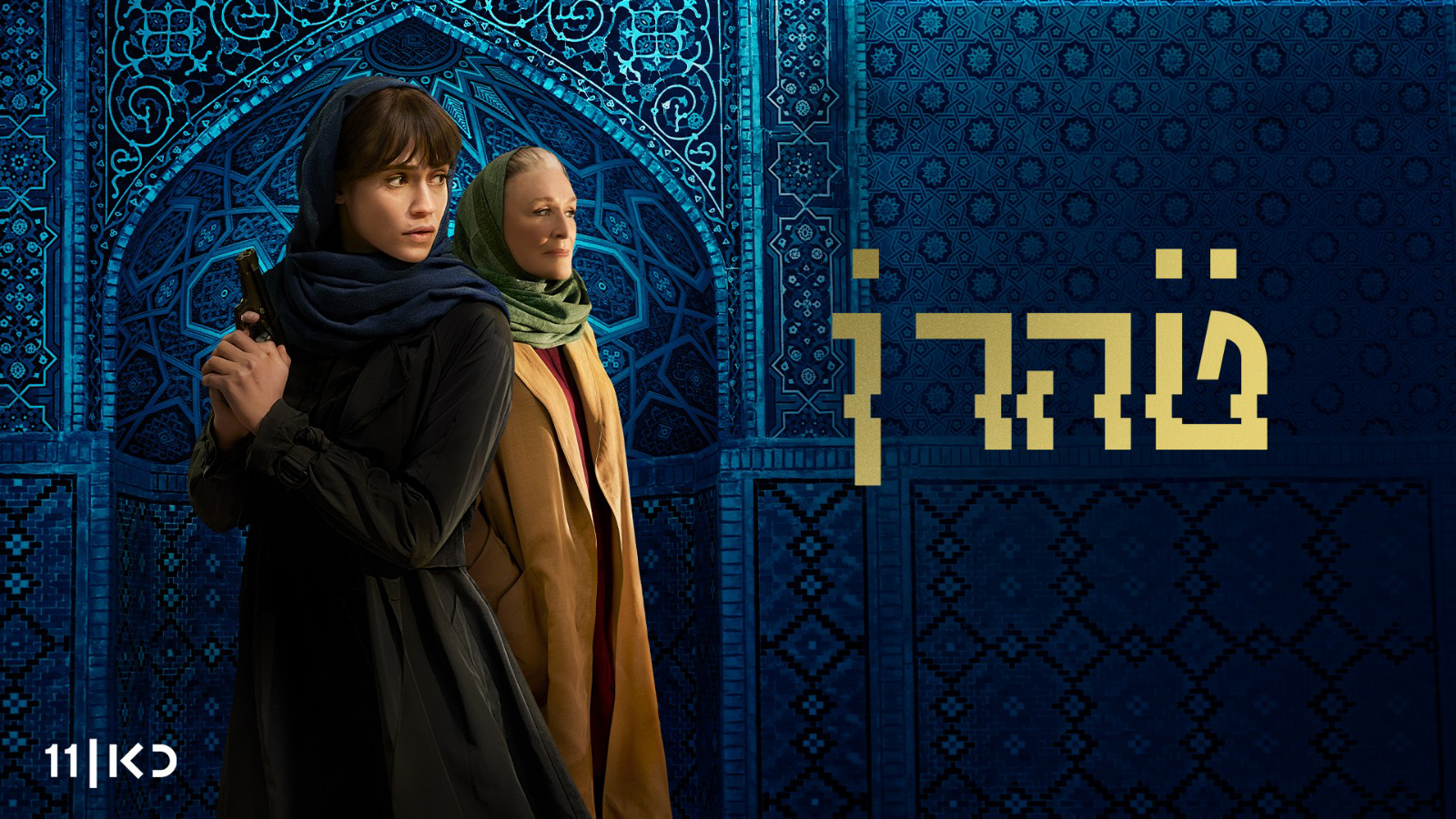
Sultan in Tehran

Sultan was chosen as the lead role in the Apple TV+ Israeli espionage television series Tehran (Hebrew: טהרן), where she stars as Tamar Rabinyan, a Mossad agent working a ground operation in Tehran, Iran.

During a 2020 interview, Sultan explained why she loves portraying Tamar in the series: "For me, that was what I love most about her. I mean, she's a real person, as you said, she's not the cliche of a superhero, Mossad agents saving the world. ...Yes, she's brave but she's also scared, makes mistakes, falls in love, and misses her dad. And I think that's the beauty of her."

In 2020, Sultan starred alongside Tomer Capone in Asaph Polonsky's short film, Long Distance. In 2022, she starred alongside Lior Ashkenazi in the Israeli suspense series, Boged (Traitor) on Hot.

In 2024, Sultan was cast in a new medical thriller series, Heart of a Murderer on Hot. She will portray Dr. Dasi Nakash, a transplant surgeon in the series.

She also stars alongside her husband, Maor Schweitzer and Amit Rahav in Matchmaking 2, a Haredi comedy film and sequel to Matchmaking.

She plays young police investigator Revi Shem-Tov in the Channel 12 crime thriller series, Murder at the Dead Sea, which began airing in late 2025 In 2026, she began filming Matchmaker 3 alongside Yadin Gellman.

== Other activities ==
Sultan is the owner of Sultana, a jewelry company, together with her sisters Bar and May.

Since 2021, she has been a brand ambassador for Samsung in Israel.

== Personal life ==
Sultan married Israeli actor Maor Schweitzer in March 2022. They met on the set of the show יש לה את זה (She Has It) in 2018, where they played an engaged couple.

== Filmography ==
=== Film ===
Year	Title	Role	Notes
2017	Kimaat Mefursemet	Shir Carmi	
2018	Flawless (Haneshef)	Avigail	
2020	Long Distance	Nira	Short film
2024	Matchmaking 2	Tzila	
2026	Matchmaking 3	Tzila	Filming

=== Television ===
Year	Title	Role	Notes
2013	Yomanei HaChofesh HaGadol (Summer Break Diaries)	Tzlil	2 episodes
2015-2017	La Famiglia	Libat Granot	Series regular
2016	Susey Pere (Wild Horses)	Alma Gefen	Series regular
2017	Metim LeRega (Temporarily Dead)	Libi Gueta	9 episodes
2018	Eilat	Tom Shahar	
2018	She Has It	Natalie Levi	Lead role (12 episodes)
2020–present	Tehran	Tamar Rabinyan (Mossad agent)	Lead role (24 episodes)
2021	Sad City Girls	Chen	Series regular
2022	That Dirty Black Bag	Eve	Lead role (8 episodes)
2022	Boged (Traitor)	Ravit	Series regular (8 episodes)
2025	Heart of a Murderer	Dr. Dasi Nakash	Lead role
2025	Murder at the Dead Sea	Revi Shem-Tov	Lead role

== See also ==
- List of Israeli actors
