= We Were the Lucky Ones =

American television series

- Based on: We Were The Lucky Ones by Georgia Hunter
- Developed by: Erica Lipez
- Showrunner: Erica Lipez
- Starring: Joey King; Logan Lerman; Henry Lloyd-Hughes; Amit Rahav; Hadas Yaron; Lior Ashkenazi; Robin Weigert; Michael Aloni
- Theme music composer: Rachel Portman; Jon Ehrlich
- Country of origin: United States
- Original language: English
- No. of episodes: 8

Production
- Executive producers: Matt Damon; Thomas Kail; Erica Lipez; Adam Milch; Jennifer Todd
- Running time: 53–75 minutes
- Production companies: Old 320 Sycamore; Danforth Cove Productions; 20th Television

Original release
- Network: Hulu
- Release: March 28 – May 2, 2024

We Were The Lucky Ones is an American historical drama miniseries developed by Erica Lipez for Hulu that premiered on March 28, 2024 and ended on May 2, 2024. It is an adaptation of the 2017 book of the same name by Georgia Hunter, inspired by the story of her own family's struggle to survive World War II and the Holocaust.

The drama centers on the Kurc family, Polish Jews, which includes five siblings portrayed by Joey King, Logan Lerman, Henry Lloyd-Hughes, Amit Rahav and Hadas Yaron and their parents, played by Lior Ashkenazi and Robin Weigert.

== Plot summary ==
In 1938, the Kurc family gather for Passover at the family home in the Polish city of Radom. Their professional successes and prosperity shield them somewhat from the virulent anti-semitism in the country. After the war begins, and as Hitler's persecution of European Jewry intensifies, the family is split apart, scattered from Poland to the Soviet Union, Italy, and Brazil. Once the war ends, the survivors attempt to find each other and reunite.

== Cast ==
- Lior Ashkenazi as Sol Kurc, the family patriarch and proprietor of the Kurc boutique
- Robin Weigert as Nechuma Kurc, the family matriarch and a seamstress
- Henry Lloyd-Hughes as Genek Kurc, the oldest sibling, a lawyer, married to Herta (Rosenblatt)
- Hadas Yaron as Mila Kurc, the second oldest sibling, married to Selim and mother of Felicia
- Logan Lerman as Addy Kurc, the middle sibling, who lives in Paris, where he is pursuing a career as a composer
- Amit Rahav as Jakob Kurc, the second youngest sibling, a law student with a passion for photography, and the boyfriend of Bella
- Joey King as Halina Kurc, the youngest sibling, who works as a lab assistant for her brother-in-law, Selim
- Moran Rosenblatt as Herta Seifert, Genek's wife
- Ido Samuel as Isaac, a loyal friend. His relationship with the Kurc family is painfully tested by his role in the Jewish Police or Judenrat
- Michael Aloni as Selim Kajler, a doctor, Mila's husband and Felicia's father
- Nitai Levi as Eryk, a young man who escaped a labour camp in Lvov
- Artemisia Pagliano as Young Felicia Kajler
- Belle Swarc as Felicia Kajler
- Nicole Brydon Bloom as Caroline, an American who works for the Embassy in Brazil.
- Lihi Kornowski as Elisabeth (Eliska) Lowbeer, a Jewish refugee from Prague who meets Addy as they flee Europe for Brazil
- Marin Hinkle as Madame Lowbeer, Eliska's mother
- Eva Feiler as Bella Tatar, Jakob's girlfriend and childhood sweetheart
- Elliot Levey as Henry Tatar, Bella's father
- Madeleine Worrall as Gustava Tatar, Bella's mother
- Anita Adam Gabay as Anna Tatar, Bella's sister
- Sam Woolf as Adam Eichenwald, an architect lodging with the Kurc family who falls in love with Halina
- Marina Bye as Rahel, a member of the Jewish Resistance in Poland

== Episodes ==
No.	Title	Directed by	Teleplay by	Original release date
1	"Radom"	Thomas Kail	Erica Lipez	March 28, 2024
It is 1938, and the Kurc family celebrates Passover together, including brother Addy, who returns from Paris for the holiday. The siblings tease Genek about his new girlfriend Herta, as well as Jakob and Bella, who have yet to marry after seven years as a couple. They also discuss growing anti-semitism in Radom. The story flashes forward to 1939. Genek has married Herta. Mila and Selim have a baby daughter named Felicia. Halina and Adam are in love, but wary of committing to marriage. Addy is unable to travel from Paris to Radom for Passover because the train would pass through German territory. On September 1, 1939, Germany invades western Poland, and World War II begins. Selim, Adam, Genek and Jakob are called up for army duty in the eastern city of Lvov. The German army reaches Radom, and the Kurcs are among those conscripted to work at farms and factories amid increasing German brutality against the local population. Herta leaves to join Genek in Soviet-occupied Lvov. Halina berates Mila and their parents for not leaving Poland while they could. The family gets news that Selim has been missing since Lvov fell to the Soviets, but the city is now relatively calm. Halina and Bella decide to make the dangerous journey to Lvov to join Halina's brothers and Bella's sister Ana, and find work.
2	"Lvov"	Amit Gupta	Erica Lipez	March 28, 2024
Halina and Bella survive their journey, including being captured and forced to work in a Soviet army camp, and reach Lvov. They reunite with Jakob, Genek, Herta, Ana and Adam. Jakob and Bella marry. Halina asks Adam, who is part of the local Jewish resistance, to help her get involved doing something useful. She tells Adam she is no longer in love with him. In Radom, the Germans evict Jews from their homes on 30 minutes notice, including Sol, Nechuma and Mila, and relocates them to the city's old Jewish quarter. Isaac shelters Mila and Felicia until the violence subsides. Mila tells him that Addy has been conscripted to a Polish unit in the French army. Sol is able to secure a home for his family by bribing a connection who is now a member of the new Nazi-appointed Jewish council, the Judenrat. In northern France, Addy forges army demobilization papers to use when he figures out "where it's safe for a Polish Jew to go next." Ten months later, by October 1940, Addy has used his forged papers to get out of the army following France's fall to the Germans, and returned to Paris. French Jews are being rounded up and deported. Addy manages to get a visa to leave France on the ship Alsina, bound for Rio de Janeiro, Brazil. In Lvov, Soviet soldiers arrest Genek, charging him with being an enemy of the state for failing to include his Polish citizenship on his apartment lease.
3	"Siberia"	Amit Gupta	Adam Milch	March 28, 2024
A pregnant Herta goes with Genek as he is arrested by Soviet military. They are loaded onto a train and spend weeks in deplorable conditions. Meanwhile, Addy has secured passage on the Alsina, one of the last refugee ships leaving France and headed to Brazil. Working to help coordinate entertainment for the guests, Addy meets a wealthy woman named Eliska Lowbeer and her mother. Addy and Eliska grow close as they spend time together and eventually realize their ship is not headed to Brazil. By December 1940, Halina is working in a lab where she uses her resources to help the underground. Herta and Genek arrive in Siberia and are forced to work in a labor camp. In March 1941, the Alsina is forced to dock in Senegal. Addy and Eliska sleep together. In Siberia, Herta goes into labor. Despite Herta’s protests, Genek pleads with the guards for time off to care for Herta but is denied and beaten. Herta gives birth to a son. The passengers on the Alsina are forced off the ship. Halina is arrested.
4	"Casablanca"	Neasa Hardiman	Anya Meksin	April 4, 2024
In June 1941, Halina is being used at the lab as an involuntary blood donor. The Kurcs in Radom have been conscripted into various labor situations. Mila’s boss is arrested, so she can no longer sneak baby Felicia into the factory where she works. Unable to care for Felicia during the day, the Kurcs smuggle Felicia out of the ghetto with the help of Isaac. Adam is needed by the resistance in Warsaw and even though Halina is conflicted, she tells him to go. In Senegal, Addy has been forced to work in a labor camp. He escapes the camp and finds Eliska and her mother to convince them to leave. Addy proposes to Eliska and she says yes. The family that was to care for Felicia return her to the Kurcs because she “looks too Jewish.” Violence begins to escalate in Lvov so Halina, Jakob and Bella go into hiding. Mila secures transport to Palestine but it turns out to be a ruse. She and the other "passengers" are instead taken to a field outside the city, where soldiers force them to dig their own graves at gunpoint. Mila realizes they are all going to be shot and killed. To save her daughter, Mila tells Felicia to run to a pretty, blond-haired, blue eyed woman who is talking to an officer. Felicia runs, calling out "mama," and the woman embraces her. They both board a wagon together. As the soldiers start shooting, Mila runs toward the wagon.
5	"Ilha Das Flores"	Neasa Hardiman	Jonathan Caren	April 11, 2024
Mila trades her wedding ring for passage on the wagon. She is reunited with Felicia and they return home. Halina, Jakob and Bella come out of hiding and return to their apartment to find it destroyed, and the building empty. Adam, Bella’s sister Ana, and Ana’s husband, Daniel, are missing. Bella searches for her sister but Ana and Daniel are most likely dead. Halina, Jakob and Bella make arrangements to return to Radom but when Halina hears that Adam may be alive and under arrest, she decides to stay in Lvov. Eliska and Addy arrive in Brazil but are detained because their visas have expired. Halina forges new identification paperwork and poses as a non-Jew to get Adam released. Genek, Herta, and other prisoners of war are released by the Soviets and transported south to fight for Poland, but the army does not want Jews in the infantry. Genek fights with Herta about the infantry job. Eliska tells Addy they are the last European Jewish refugees being allowed into Brazil. Addy is upset because he will not be able to send for his family, but Eliska angrily tells him to leave the past behind. The Kurcs celebrate Rosh Hashanah. Sol reveals he has received a letter from Halina, who says she and Adam are together, married and living in Warsaw. Bella tells Jakob she is pursuing a factory job away from the ghetto, because too much there reminds her of her dead sister. Genek asks a fellow conscript for lessons on Catholicism so he can join the infantry. Finally freed from detention in Brazil, Eliska and Addy go their separate ways.
6	"Warsaw"	Amit Gupta	Eboni Booth	April 18, 2024
September 1941 - At Halina’s suggestion, Mila carries out a plan to escape the ghetto with Felicia and move to Warsaw. A year later, in October 1942, Bella and Jakob are living separately; she is in factory housing outside the ghetto while he is still in the ghetto working as a photographer for a German officer. Mila and Halina, passing as non-Jews, are working in Warsaw as a nanny and a house servant, respectively, for rich families. Bella learns her parents are going to be sent to a concentration camp. Halina pays off a German officer in exchange for her parents’ freedom and makes arrangements for them to live with in hiding with sympathizers. Bella tries to convince her parents to leave with her but they tell her that she has a better chance of survival without them. Jakob and other Jews are forced out of their homes in the middle of the night as the Nazis begin to empty the ghetto. The next day, Jakob is able to talk his way into seeing Bella and they have an emotional reunion. Mila goes to see Felicia, who is being cared for at a convent under a false identity. As German soldiers begin transporting the Jewish workers at Bella's factory to concentration camps, she and Jakob, along with a few other workers, cut through a wire fence and escape into nearby woods.
7	"Monte Cassino"	Neasa Hardiman	Tea Ho & Adam Milch	April 25, 2024
It’s April 1943. Addy, in Rio, writes to his family members and despairs at getting no responses. A month later, it is shown that Jakob and Bella are living and working in Warsaw by passing as non-Jewish Poles. By June 1943, with the free Polish army now in British Palestine, Genek is posing as a Catholic in order to remain in the infantry and keep his family fed and housed. Felicia, who has to go by the name "Barbara", is suffering from nightmares and arousing suspicion in one of the nuns. Genek, in the camp hospital with an ulcer, is reunited with his brother-in-law Selim (Mila’s husband), who had been conscripted as an army physician very early in the war. Seven months later, in January 1944 in Warsaw, Halina is recognized on the street by a woman from Radom, who threatens to expose her as a Jew. Halina gives the woman some money and her winter coat to silence her, then threatens to kill her if she sees her again. Halina is offered a job in Krakow by her boss, who is moving there, but she declines. Mila visits Felicia, and the nun helping hide Felicia’s true identity asks Mila to come less frequently so as to not confuse Felicia further. Genek and Selim are now with the army in Italy. The front nears Warsaw. In Rio, Addy meets an American embassy worker named Caroline at a party and they begin dating. The Nazis massacre the Warsaw ghetto resistance and transport the ghetto residents away to death camps. As war starts to consume the city, Halina travels to Krakow to ask her former boss for help but is captured by Nazi soldiers. The orphanage has been bombed but Mila and Adam find Felicia alive. Genek and the army embark on a "suicide mission" to capture Monte Cassino.
8	"Rio"	Thomas Kail	Erica Lipez	May 2, 2024
October 1944 - Halina is imprisoned in the Montelupich Prison in Krakow, Poland. For three months, she is tortured but she never admits her true name or to being a Jew. Even as executions of prisoners increase, Halina's former employer comes to her rescue by vouching for her, and she is released. Bella is pregnant. Halina and Adam are reunited and visit her parents, who are alive and still in hiding. In May 1945, Addy and Caroline, in Rio, listen to the radio news of Nazi Germany's surrender. Sol, Nechuma and Halina return to their home in Radom in the hope of finding mail from Genek or Addy, but are turned away by the tenants now living in their apartment. Adam learns that his family has not survived. Caroline and Addy decide to get married. Halina receives correspondence from Genek that he is with Selim and Herta in Italy. Felicia questions Mila about her father. The Kurcs immediately start planning their travel route to Italy. However, Bella and Jakob decide they will go to the United States and stay with Bella’s uncle. Sol, Nechuma, Adam, Halina, Mila and Felicia make the journey to Italy on foot, across the Alps. Halina tells Adam she is pregnant. The Kurcs have an emotional reunion in Italy. October 1945 - In Lodz, Poland, Jakob and Bella, with their baby, prepare to leave for the United States. In Rio, Caroline and Addy are pregnant and decide to move to the U.S. after the baby is born. While meeting Eliska for lunch, Addy is approached by a man who works for the Polish consulate, who says the consulate has received a telegram for Addy. It is from Genek, telling him that his family is alive. June 1946 - Caroline and Addy have a baby girl. The Kurcs arrive in Rio via ship. Ten months later, the Kurcs celebrate Passover together, again, and remember the people they have lost. In the credits, we learn that Halina and Adam moved to São Paulo, Brazil and had two children. Mila, Selim and Felicia stayed in Rio. Felicia went to medical school and started a family in France. Genek, Herta and their two sons lived in São Paulo near Halina. Jakob and Maryla (Bella) moved to Chicago. Addy and Caroline settled in Massachusetts with their three children. Sol and Nechuma lived in São Paulo near their children. There are more than 100 Kurc descendants today.

== Production ==
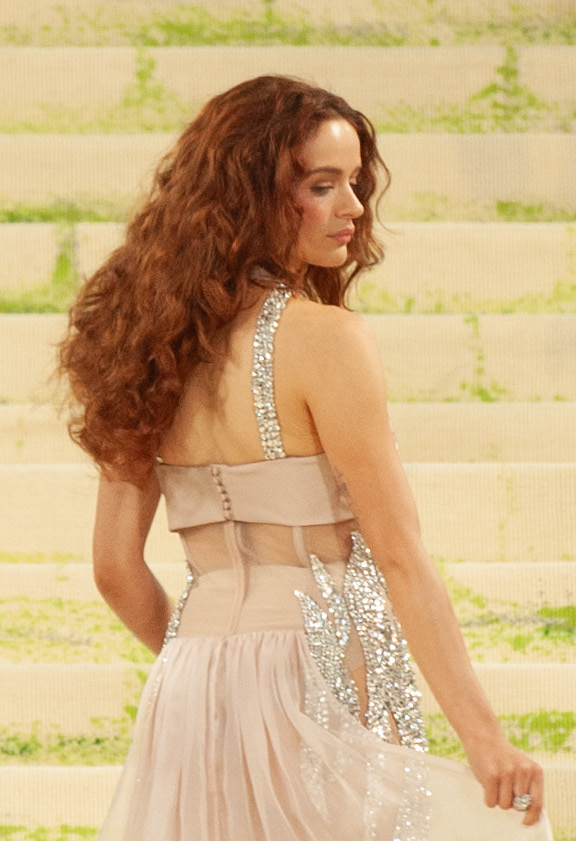
Joey King

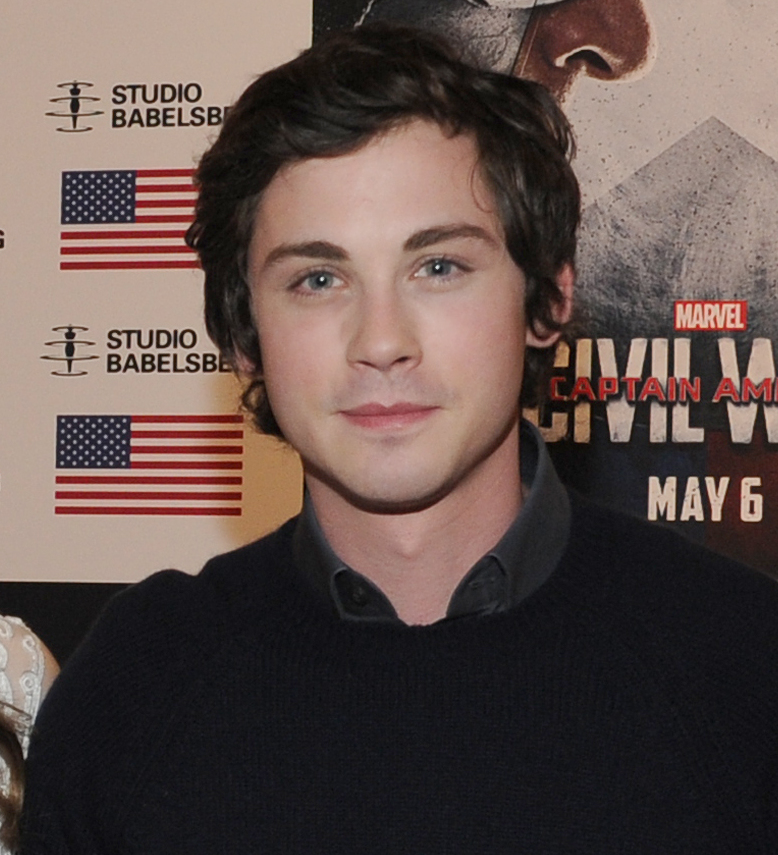
Logan Lerman

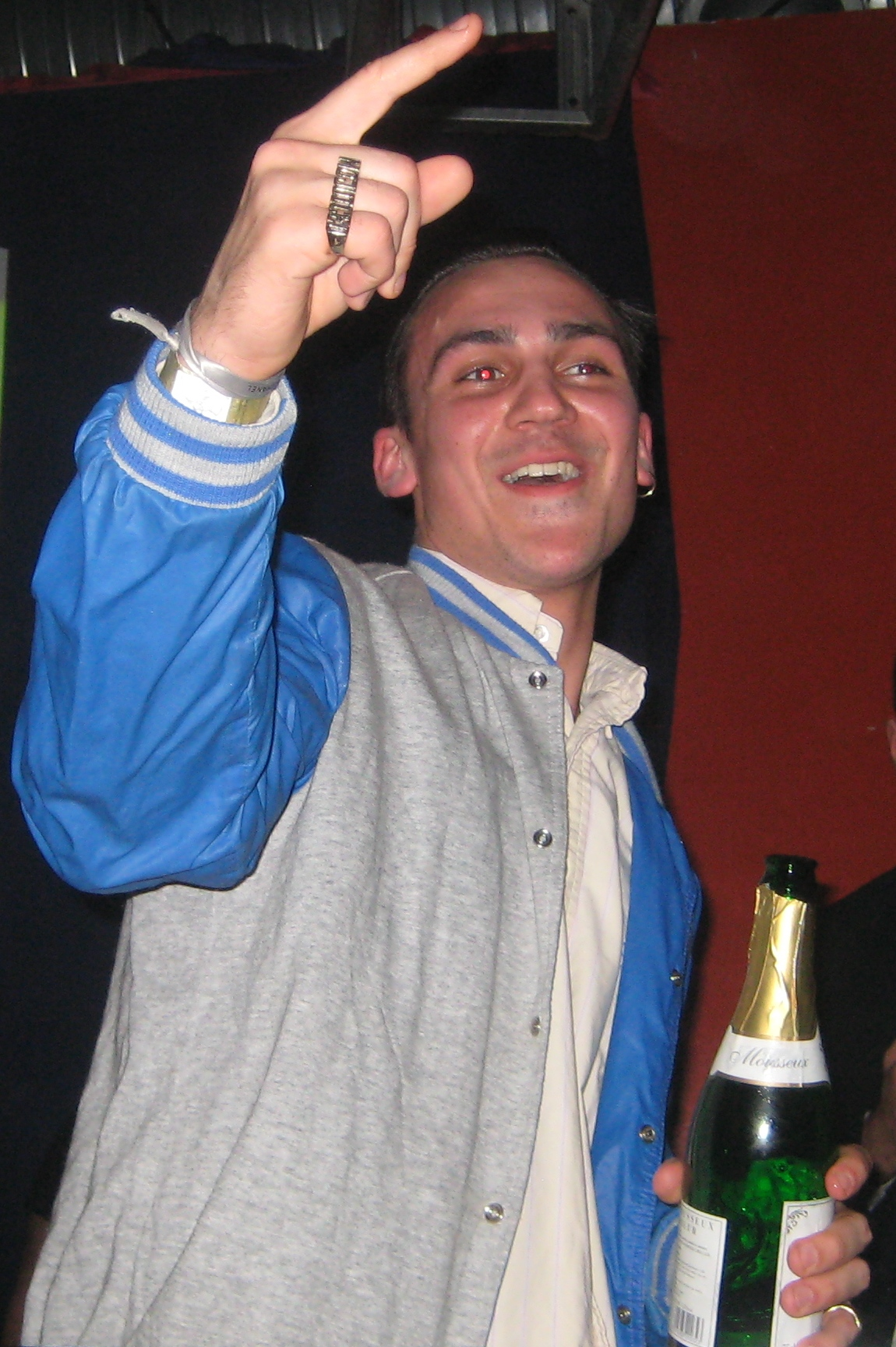
Henry Lloyd-Hughes

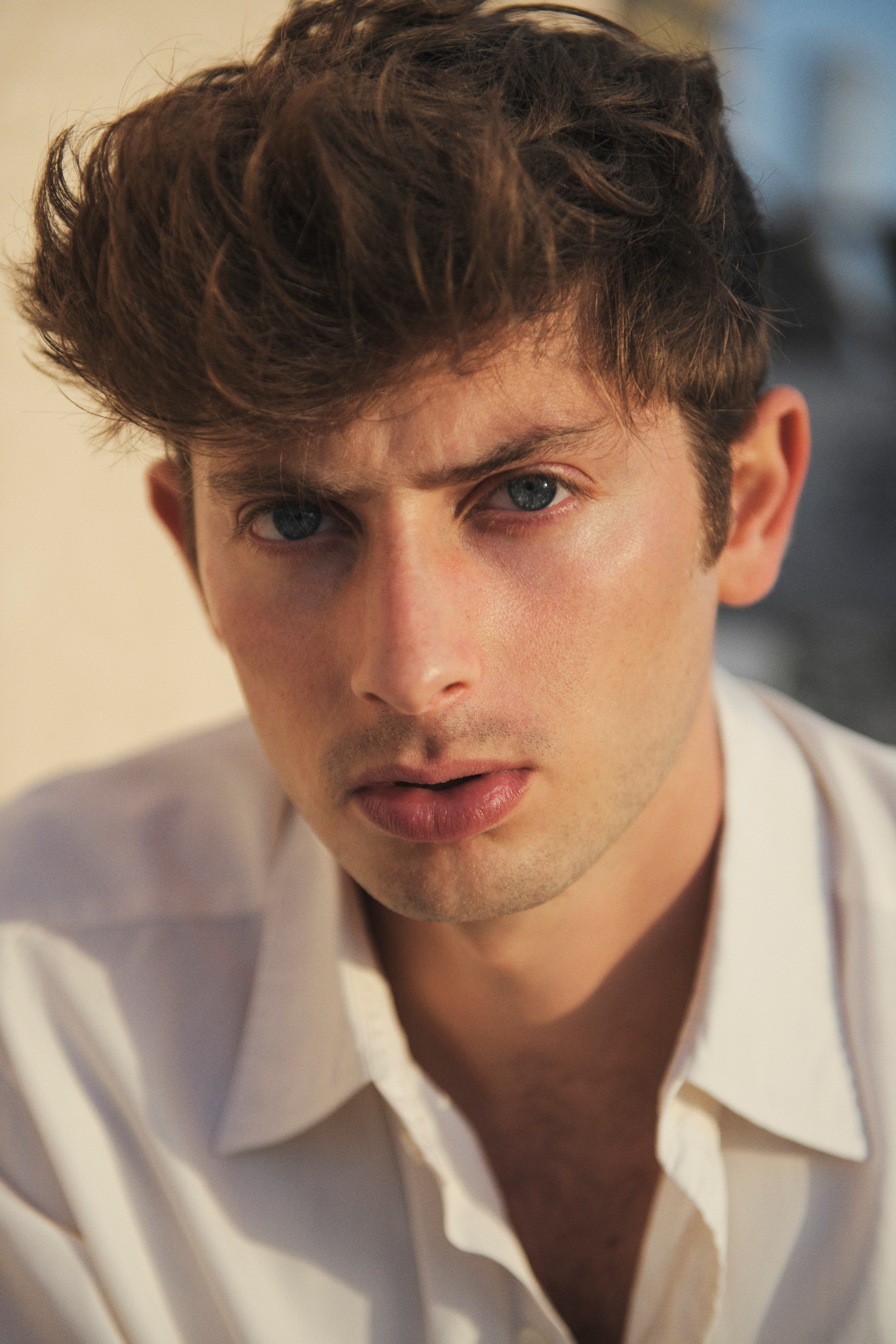
Amit Rahav

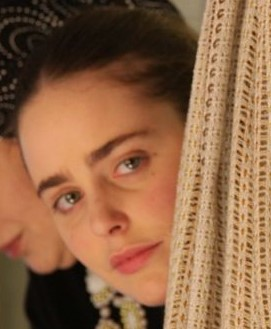
Hadas Yaron

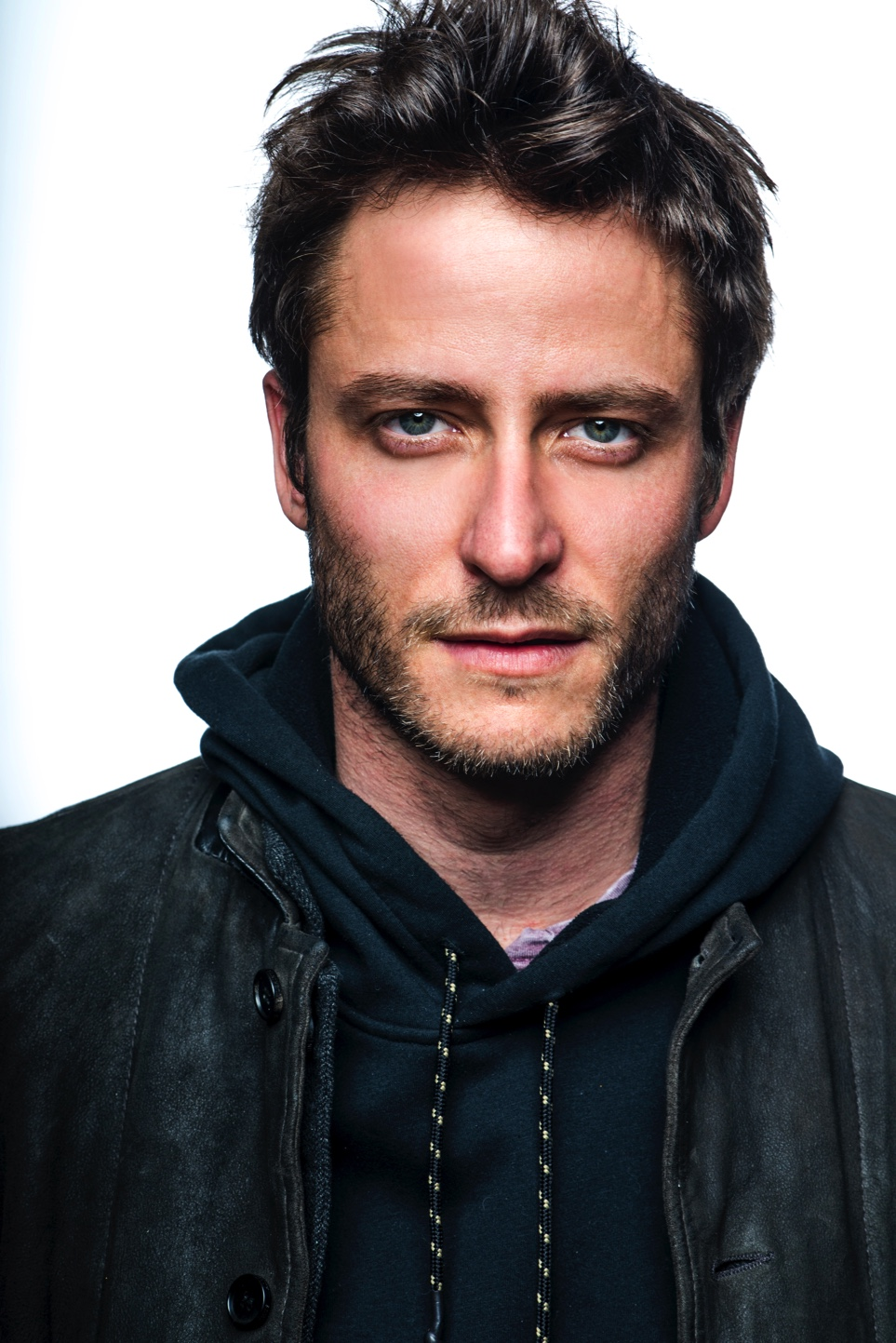
Michael Aloni

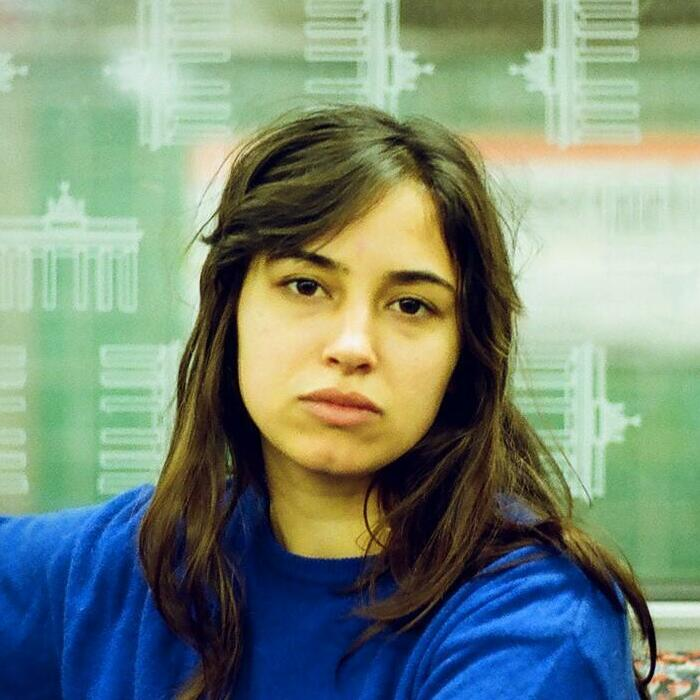
Moran Rosenblatt

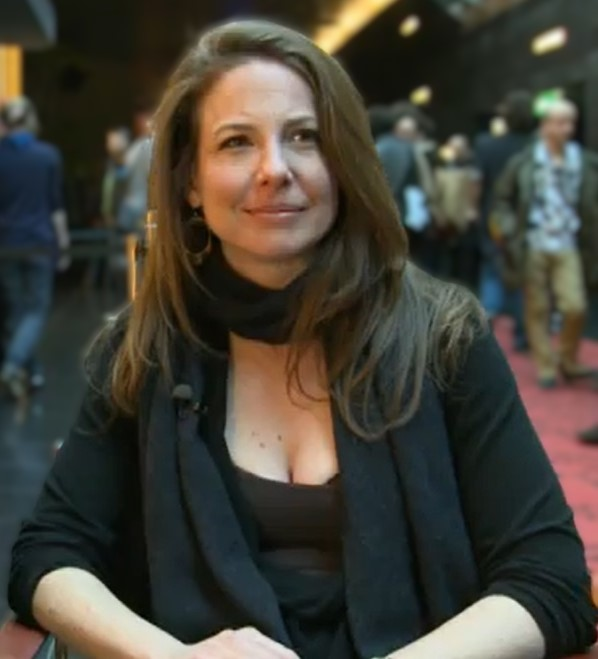
Robin Weigert

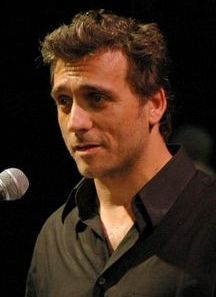
Lior Ashkenazi

Main cast of We Were the Lucky Ones in billing order.

The series is produced by 20th Television and is adapted by Erica Lipez from the 2017 Georgia Hunter book We Were The Lucky Ones, a New York Times Best Seller inspired by the story of her own family. Lipez also serves as showrunner and executive producer. Thomas Kail is director and executive producer, along with Adam Milch and Jennifer Todd who executive produces for Old 320 Sycamore and Ben Affleck and Matt Damon who executive produces for Pearl Street Films. The score is composed by Rachel Portman and Jon Ehrlich.

=== Casting ===
Joey King, Logan Lerman, Henry Lloyd-Hughes, Amit Rahav and Hadas Yaron were cast as siblings who grow up in Radom, Poland with Lerman's role of Addy Kurc based on Hunter's real-life grandfather. Both King and Lerman have discussed having family members themselves who escaped The Holocaust.

Most of the characters are Polish Jews and these roles are mostly played by Jewish actors from the United States, Israel and England. This is the second time that Yaron and Aloni have appeared as a couple, following their 2015–2021 work in the Israeli drama series Shtisel. The role of Madame Lowbeer is portrayed by a non-Jewish actress, Marin Hinkle, who has a real-life Jewish husband and raised their son as a Jew.

=== Filming ===
Filming took place from December 2022 and finished in spring 2023. Primarily filming took place in Bucharest, Romania with filming locations also including Málaga and Cádiz in Spain.

== Release ==
We Were the Lucky Ones premiered on Hulu in the United States on March 28, 2024. Internationally, the series was released on Disney+.

== Reception ==
=== Viewership ===
TVision, using its Power Score to evaluate CTV programming through viewership and engagement across over 1,000 apps, calculated that We Were the Lucky Ones was the fourth most-streamed series from March 25–31. Luminate, which gathers viewership data from certain smart TVs in the U.S., announced that We Were the Lucky Ones was watched for 147.2 million minutes from March 29 to April 4.

=== Critical response ===
The review aggregator website Rotten Tomatoes reported a 95% approval rating with an average rating of 8/10, based on 22 critic reviews. The website's critics consensus reads, "Equal parts harrowing and life-affirming, We Were the Lucky Ones is a sensitively told tale of perseverance given tear-inducing heart by its wonderful ensemble." Metacritic, which uses a weighted average, assigned the limited series a "generally favorable" score of 80 out of 100, based on 13 critics.

RogerEbert.com concluded that "We Were the Lucky Ones is a defiant and harrowing, soul shattering story—one that gives the full range of the horrors that occur when you've been displaced, unmoored, and dehumanized." Aramide Tinibu of Variety also praised the series: "Spending extended time with each member of the Kurcs allows the viewer to get into their psyche while absorbing differing perspectives and opinions instead of a monolithic overview of Holocaust survivors."

The Jewish parenting website Kveller praised the series as "a visceral, touching, sweeping and profoundly human show, one of the best you'll see all year, and the Jewish representation in it is deeply thoughtful, perhaps more than any show I’ve ever seen." The Boston Globe concluded: "So yes, the miniseries is challenging, and steeped in heartbreak, and unrelenting. But it joins a growing inventory of important, eye-opening, memorable, and timely TV takes on the Holocaust and World War II. Ultimately it is as rewarding as it is harrowing."

Israeli journalist Shimon Briman and Ukrainian historian and Holocaust researcher Andrii Usach criticized the way the series depicted the Lviv pogroms. They pointed out that the series depicted the crowd of pogrom-mongers as entirely Ukrainian, with Ukrainian and Nazi flags. In reality, the participants in the pogrom did not have flags, and according to the memoirs of the victims, there were both Poles and Ukrainians in the crowd. According to Shimon Briman "a scene was purposefully included in this American series to link Ukraine's contemporary realities to the pogrom and deliberately emphasize the Ukrainian component among the participants in anti-Jewish violence." Andrii Usach also pointed out the inconsistency of the scene in which an officer in a Polish uniform shoots a Jew - only Germans killed with firearms in Lviv in those days.

=== Accolades ===
We Were the Lucky Ones was one of 200 television series that received the ReFrame Stamp for the years 2023 to 2024. The stamp is awarded by the gender equity coalition ReFrame and industry database IMDbPro for film and television projects that are proven to have gender-balanced hiring, with stamps being awarded to projects that hire female-identifying people, especially women of color, in four out of eight key roles for their production.

Award	Date of ceremony	Category	Nominee(s)	Result	Ref.
Astra TV Awards	December 8, 2024	Best Limited Series	We Were the Lucky Ones	Nominated	
Astra TV Awards	December 8, 2024	Best Actress in a Limited Series or TV Movie	Joey King	Nominated	
Critics' Choice Awards	February 7, 2025	Best Limited Series	We Were the Lucky Ones	Nominated	
Critics' Choice Awards	February 7, 2025	Best Supporting Actor in a Limited Series or Movie Made for Television	Logan Lerman	Nominated	
