= The Divine Mrs S. =

2024 play by April De Angelis

The Divine Mrs S is a 2024 play by April De Angelis, premiered at the Hampstead Theatre from 22 March to 27 April 2024. It covers events in the life of Sarah Siddons, particularly the premiere of De Monfort and her portrayal of Lady Macbeth.

== Premiere Cast ==
- Patti - Anusha Chahravarti
- John Philip Kemble - Dominic Rowan
- Clara / Joanna Baillie / Galindo / Arthur - Eva Feiler
- Mrs Larpent / Cowslip - Sadie Shimmin
- Boaden / Thomas Lawrence / Percy Scraggs - Gareth Snook
- Sarah Siddons - Rachael Stirling
