= Yoram Loewenstein Performing Arts Studio =

Israeli learning institution founded 1989

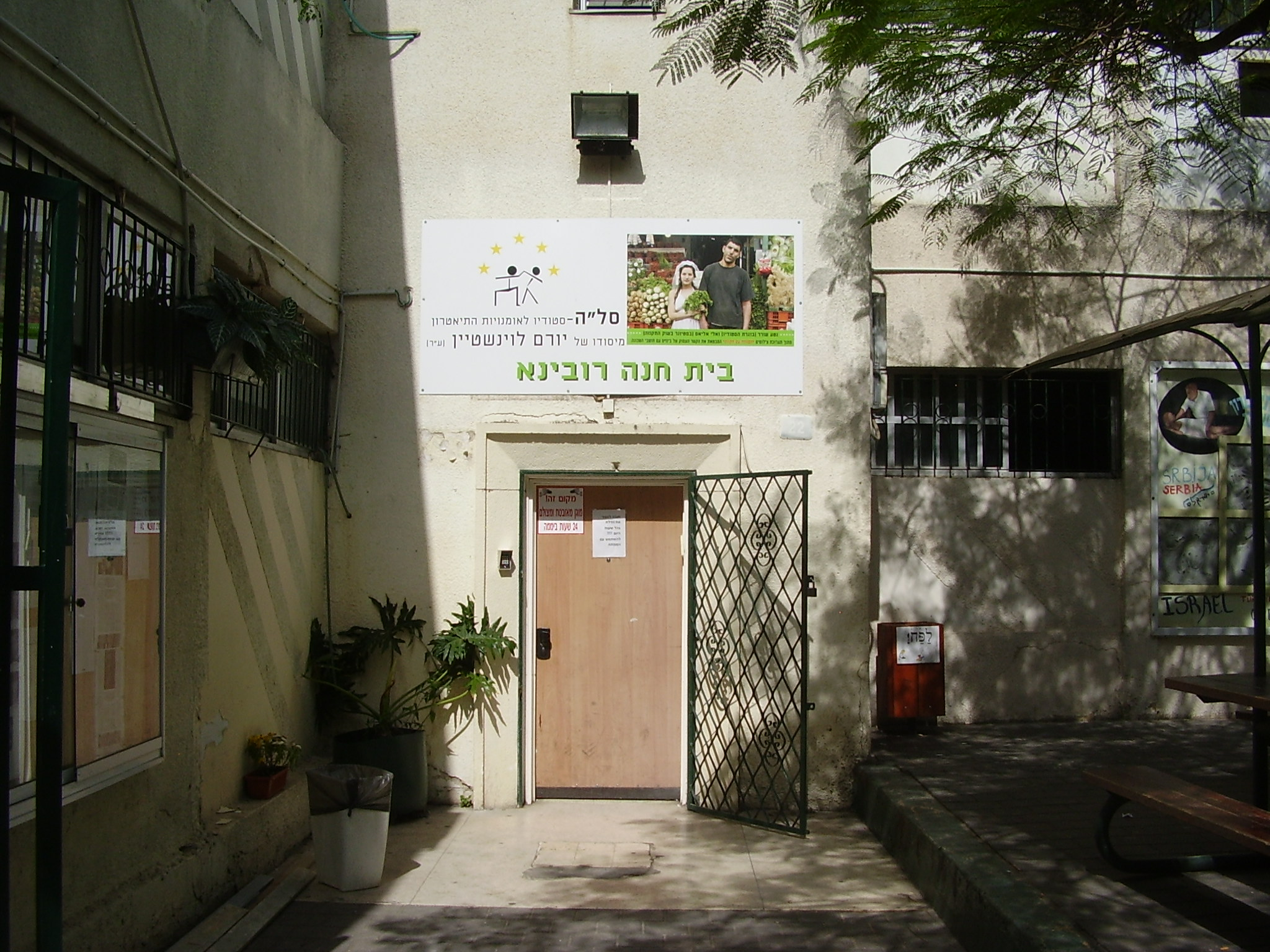
- Yoram Loewenstein Acting School in 2011
- Formation: 1988
- Type: Drama school
- Headquarters: Hanna Rovina House, 22 Mevaser St, Hatikva Quarter, Tel Aviv
- Region served: Israel

Yoram Loewenstein Performing Arts Studio (Hebrew: יורם לוונשטיין סטודיו לאמנויות הבמה) is an acting school, and a theater located in Hatikva Quarter, a neighbourhood of Tel Aviv in Israel. The vocational school was founded in 1988.

== History ==
Before the establishment of the school in 1988, Yoram Loewenstein had been running a private acting workshop since 1982. The workshop was run from the living room at no.9 HaAvoda St in Tel Aviv.

In 1988, Loewenstein rented a building in Tel Aviv for his school. Actors Ayelet Zurer and Aki Avni were among the first graduates in 1992.

The studio is now located in Hanna Rovina House on 22 Mevaser St. in the Hatikva Quarter of Tel Aviv. The 1960s building was originally built as a daycare center for the children of the neighbourhood.

The studio's actors and directors have staged productions of plays by acclaimed Israeli dramatist, Hanoch Levin. Yuval Segal, then a student at Yoram Lowenstein in the 1990s, appeared in a production of Winter Funeral. In 2024, the studio staged a well-received production of Levin's Krum.

The studio also stages productions written by foreign dramatists. In 2018, the studio staged a production of Arthur Miller's A View from the Bridge with students Tomer Machloof and Niv Sultan.

In October 2019, a branch of the school was opened in Nazareth to serve the Arab Israeli community. It is a collaborative project between Loewenstein and Hisham Sulliman, a graduate of the Loewenstein studio in Tel Aviv.

Maya Puder, a former student and aspiring actress, was murdered at the age of 25 at the Re'im music festival massacre on October 7, 2023.

== Notable alumni ==
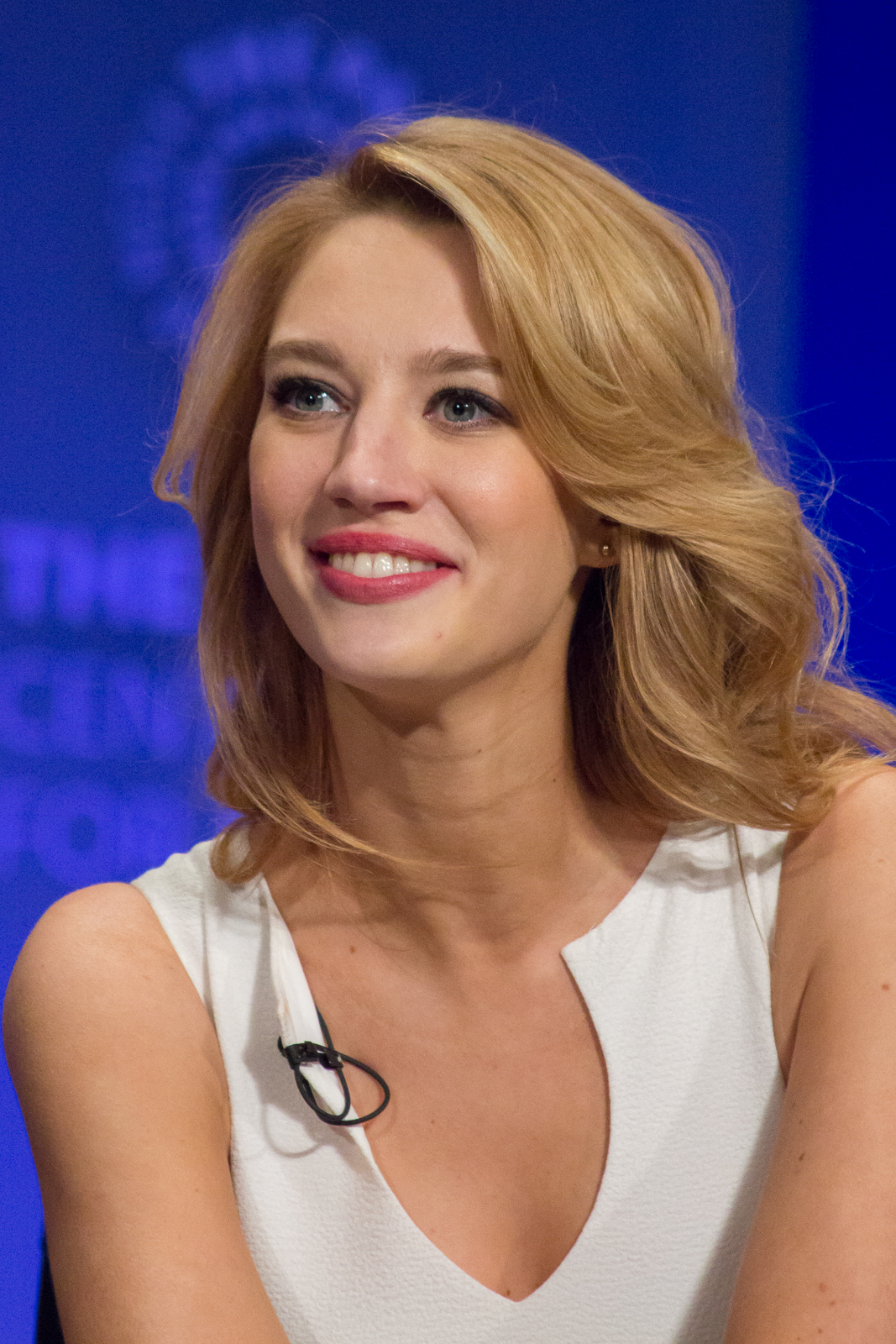
Yael Grobglas

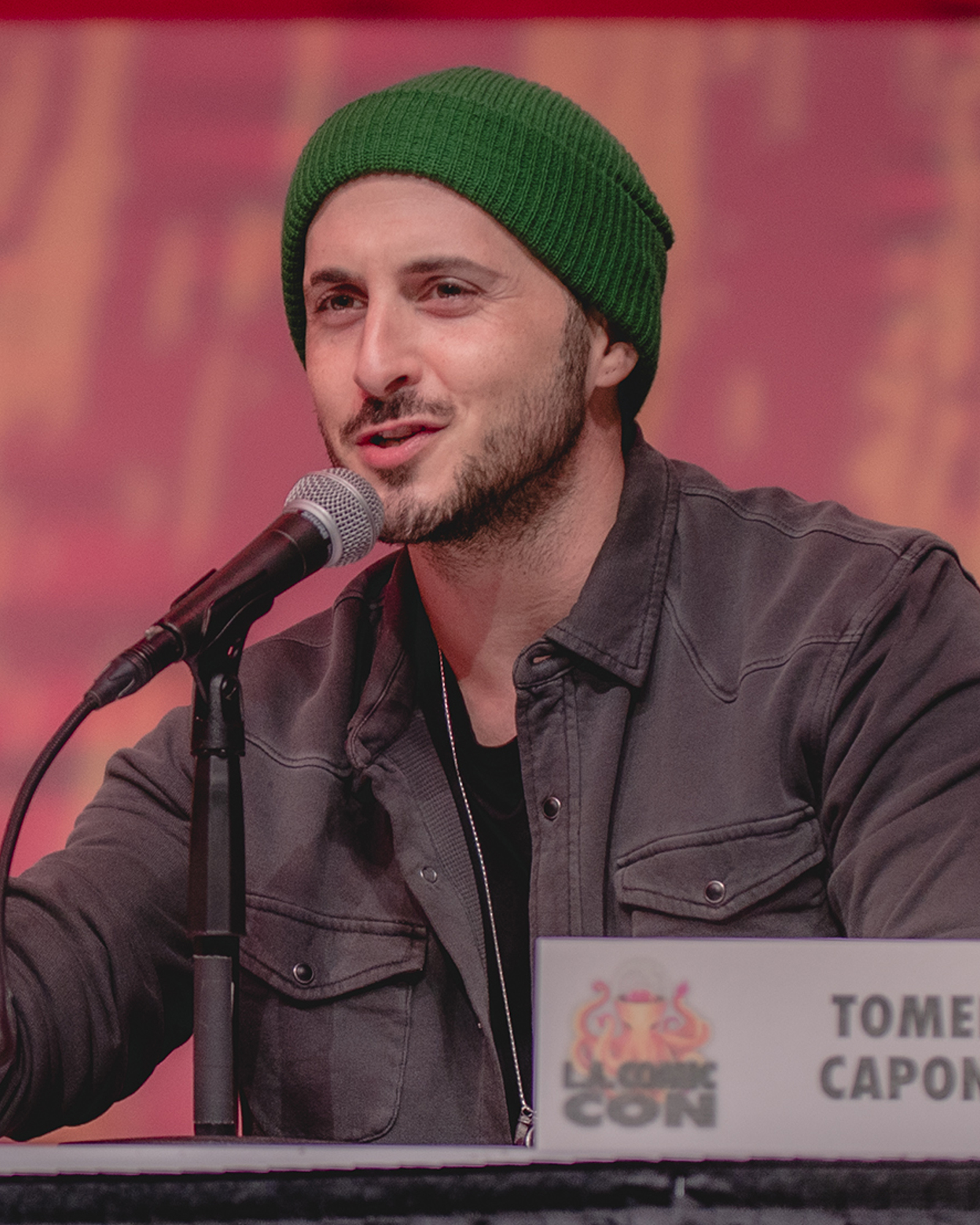
Tomer Kapon

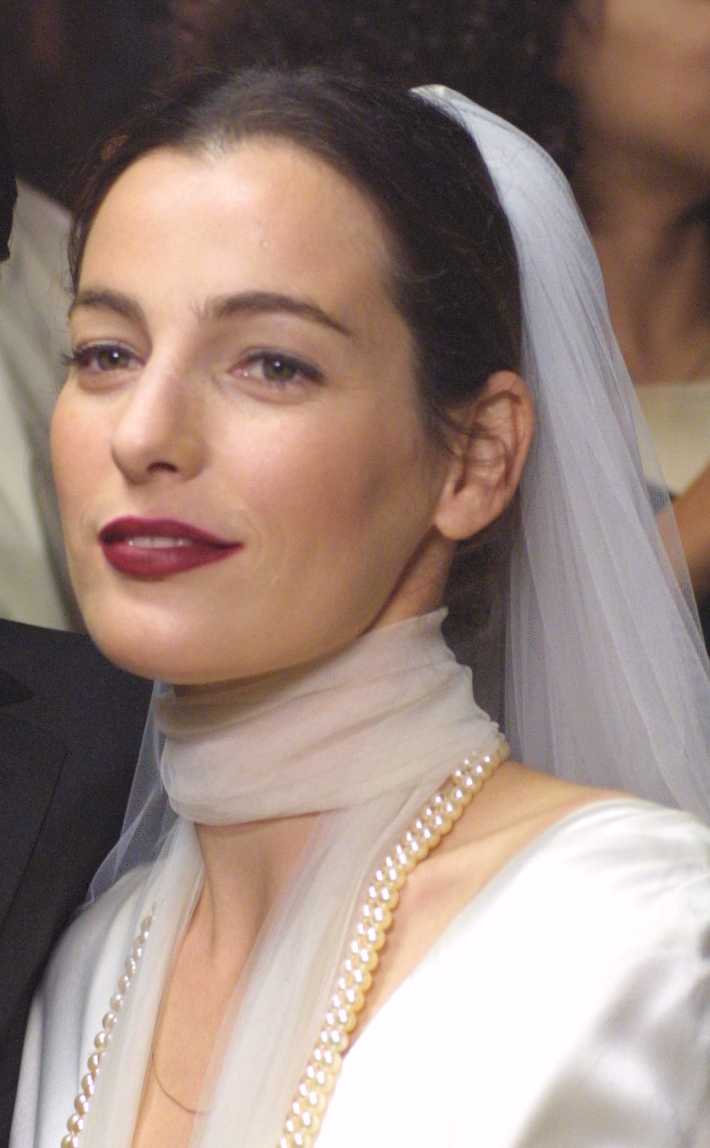
Ayelet Zurer

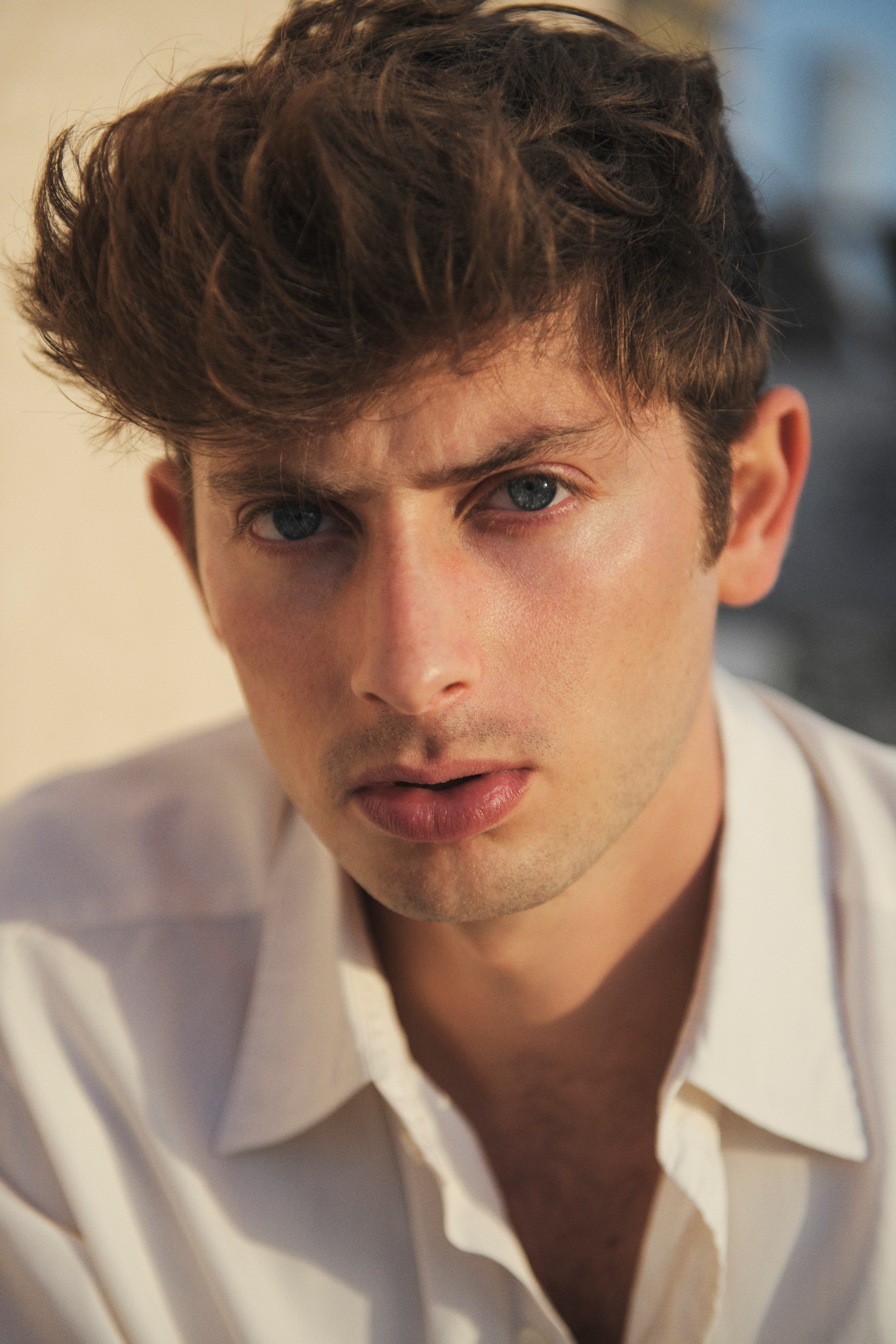
Amit Rahav

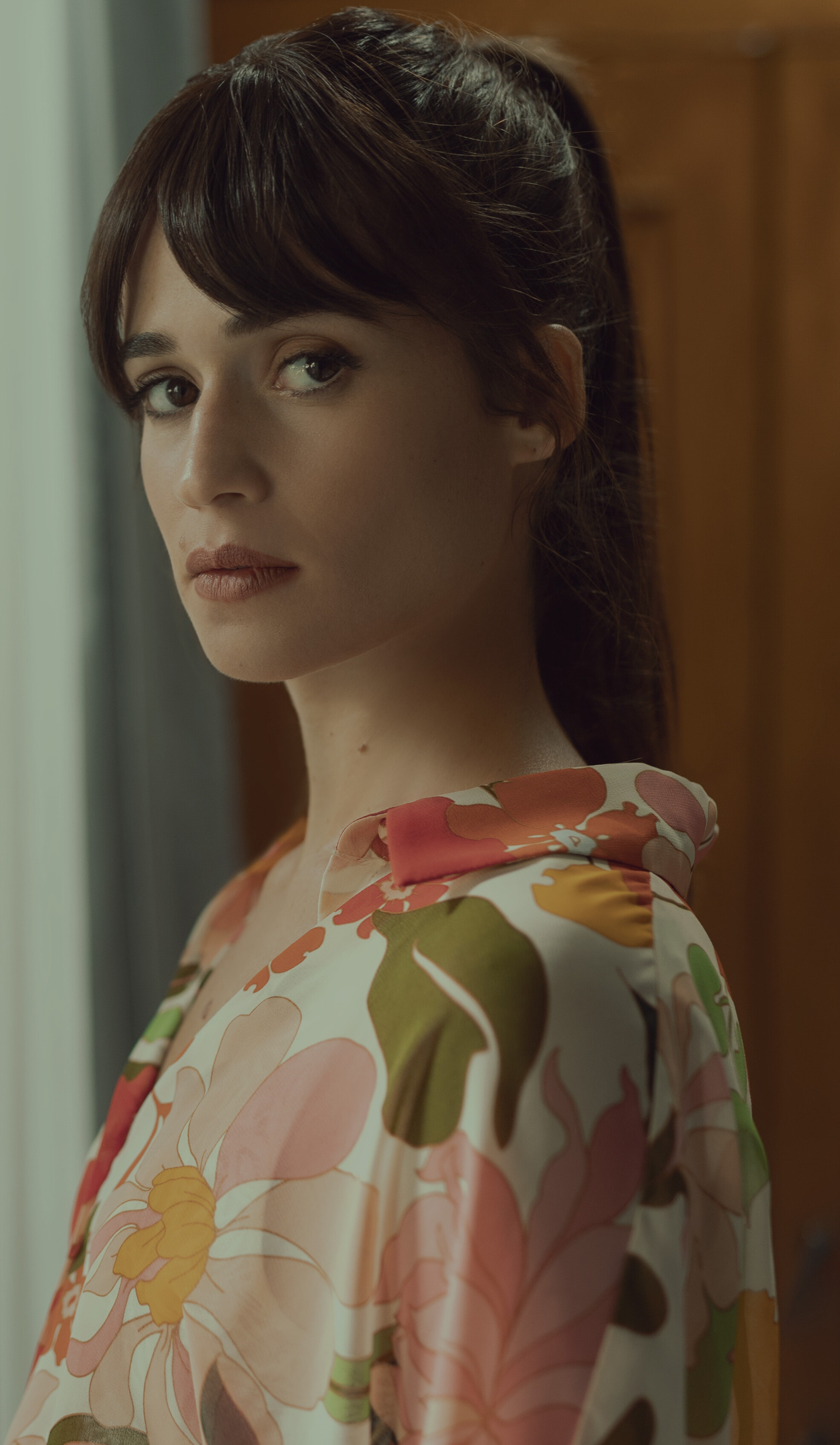
Niv Sultan

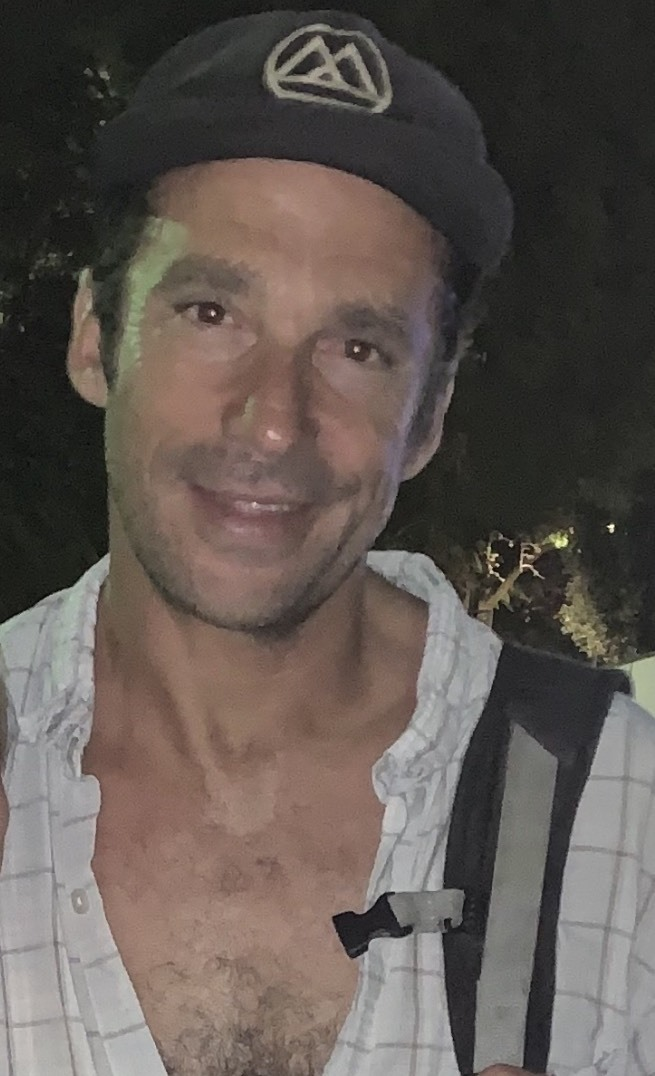
Yuval Segal

- Aki Avni
- Adi Bielski
- Bar Brimer
- Yadin Gellman
- Yael Goldman
- Yael Grobglas
- Galit Gutman
- Tomer Kapon
- Noa Koler
- Lihi Kornowski
- Ori Laizerouvich
- Asi Levi
- Tomer Machloof
- Roi Miller
- Michael Moshonov
- Omer Perelman Striks
- Aviv Pinkas
- Amit Rahav
- Yuval Segal
- Ofer Shechter
- Hadar Ratzon-Rotem
- Zohar Strauss
- Hisham Sulliman
- Niv Sultan
- Hilla Vidor
- Yehonatan Vilozny
- Ayelet Zurer
- Efrat Rayten
