= Sam Woolf (actor) =

English actor

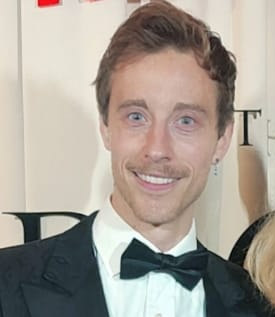
- Sam Woolf at 'The Crown' Premiere
- Born: Alexander Samuel Woolf; 20 June 1992 (age 33)
- Occupation: Actor

Alexander Samuel Woolf (born 20 June 1992) is an English actor known for his roles on Call the Midwife, Humans, The Crown, and The Witcher. He starred as Joey King's love interest in Hulu's World War II drama We Were the Lucky Ones. In 2025, he made his feature film debut as Bernardo in Hamnet.

== Personal life ==
Woolf was born in 1991 and grew up in London and Radlett. His brother is the journalist and podcaster Nicky Woolf. Woolf is Jewish.

== Career ==
Woolf has appeared in numerous theatre productions including Cheek By Jowl's 'The Winter's Tale' at the Barbican Theatre, the National Theatre's 'Anthony and Cleopatra' alongside Ralph Fiennes, and The Bridge Theatre's 'Alys Always' with Joanne Froggatt.

He began his television career with roles in Humans and Call the Midwife, before taking on larger roles in Netflix's The Crown playing Prince Edward and The Witcher playing the villain Rience taking over from actor Chris Fulton for Series 3.

In 2023 Woolf was cast alongside Joey King to play Adam Eichenwald in the TV adaptation of Georgia Hunter's novel 'We Were The Lucky ones' airing on Hulu and Disney in 2024.

== Acting credits ==
=== Audiobooks, Audio Entertainment, and Podcasts ===
Year	Title	Role	Notes	Ref(s)
2018	Doctor Who: The Early Adventures	Kim	Season 5, Episode 3 "Entanglement"	

=== Television ===
Year	Title	Role	Notes	Ref(s)
2016	Humans	Artie	Season 2, Episode 1	
2020	Call The Midwife	Dr. Benedict Walters	Season 9, Episode 4	
2022	Strike	Roy Phipps (1970s)	2 episodes - "Troubled Blood" (Part 1 & 2)	
2022	The Crown	Prince Edward	5 episodes in season 5	
2022	Theodosia	Vincent Carruthers	2 episodes	
2023	The Power	Posh Boy		
2023	The Witcher	Rience	4 episodes in season 3	
2024	We Were the Lucky Ones	Adam Eichenwald	Main role	

=== Film ===
Year	Title	Role	Ref(s)
2025	Hamnet	Bernardo	

=== Video Games ===
Year	Title	Role	Notes	Ref(s)
2020	Assassin's Creed: Valhalla	Birstan		
2023	Call of Dragons	Velyn		
2024	Dragon Quest III HD-2D Remake	Voice role unknown	English version	
