= Image of Victory =

- Theatrical release poster
- Hebrew: תמונת הניצחון
- Directed by: Avi Nesher
- Written by: Avi Nesher
- Produced by: Ehud Bleiberg; Elad Gavish (executive)
- Starring: Joy Rieger; Amir Khoury; Ala Dakka
- Cinematography: Amit Yasur
- Edited by: Isaac Sehayek
- Music by: Tom Oren
- Production companies: Bleiberg Entertainment and United King Films
- Release date: 23 December 2021 (Israel)
- Running time: 128 minutes
- Country: Israel
- Languages: Hebrew; Arabic

Image of Victory (Hebrew: תמונת הניצחון) is a 2021 Israeli historical war drama film directed by Avi Nesher. The film includes a reenactment of the battle and subsequent loss of Kibbutz Nitzanim during Israel’s War of Independence and is based on real events.

Upon its release it was the most expensive Israeli film production in history.

The film was nominated for fifteen categories in the 2021 Ophir Awards and won three of them: Best Cinematography, Best Makeup, and Best Costume Design.

== Plot ==
The story takes place between late 1947 and June 1948, and focuses mainly on the days before the Battle of Nitzanim and on the battle itself (7 June 1948), at the end of which Nitzanim is conquered by the Egyptian forces and the surviving defenders are taken prisoners.

A young Egyptian journalist, Hassanin (Amir Khoury), accompanies an Egyptian volunteer fighting force heading to aid the Palestinian Arabs, as a director of a propaganda film to capture an "image of victory" of the Egyptian Army. They set camp the foot of the kibbutz within which the members, together with a platoon of the Givati Brigade, prepare to defend.

== Cast ==
Actor Name	Character Name	Character Background
Joy Rieger	Mira Ben-Ari	Nitzanim kibbutz member
Amir Khoury	Hassanin	Egyptian journalist sent to capture an "image of victory" for the Egyptian side
Ala Dakka	Khalif	Commander of the Egyptian force
Eliana Tidhar	Ada	Kibbutz member, immigrant from Argentina, Hadassa's cousin, works in the kibbutz's children's house
Tom Avni	Yareakh Bleiberg	Kibbutz member, dairy farmer
Meshi Kleinstein	Hadassa	Kibbutz member, immigrant from Argentina, Ada's cousin
Elisha Banai	Elyakim Ben Ari	Kibbutz member, Mira's ex-partner
Netta Roth	Naomi	Kibbutz member
Elad Levi	Khaim "J'amous" (Buffalo)	Soldier in the Israeli force
Yadin Gellman	Avraham Schwarzstein	Commander of the Israeli force
Gil Cohen	Khabani	Soldier in the Israeli force
Adam Gabay	Ben Gigi	Sergeant of the Israeli force
Amit Moresht	"Kilometer"	Soldier in the Israeli force
Nir Knaan	Zigi	Kibbutz member, immigrant from Germany, pianist, Holocaust survivor
Yonatan Barak	Abba Kovner	Politruk
Hisham Sulliman		Cinema logs producer
Abdallah El Akal	Salman	
Itamar Zohar	Romek	Kibbutz member
Noam Segal	Dani Ben Ari	Son of Elyakim and Mira
Kamal Zaid	Yousuf	

== Reception ==
Hannah Brown in a review by The Jerusalem Post called the film "a great anti-war epic". She praised it as "not so much a political movie as an existential statement about the price paid, quite literally, for the image of the title. Image of Victory is the crowning achievement of Nesher’s career and it is the rare movie that may change the way you look at the world."

Alissa Simon praised the film in a review for Variety: "Its consideration of how storytelling and visual images can be weaponized makes it a tale with great resonance for these times."

Leslie Felperin of The Guardian was more critical, writing that "A film that tries to empathise with everybody runs the risk of pleasing no one, and no doubt there will be viewers enraged by this or that detail or unspoken perspective, but the ambition is nevertheless pretty impressive and on the whole well executed."
