= Matchmaking (film) =

- בחורים טובים
- Directed by: Erez Tadmor
- Written by: Erez Tadmor; Hava Divon; Yaki Reisner
- Produced by: Moshe Edery; Leon Edery
- Starring: Amit Rahav; Maor Schweitzer; Liat Ayoun
- Cinematography: Roey Roth
- Edited by: Einat Glaser-Zarhin
- Music by: Frank Ilfman
- Distributed by: United King Films
- Release date: 15 September 2022
- Running time: 96 minutes
- Country: Israel
- Language: Hebrew

Matchmaking (Hebrew: בחורים טובים) is a 2022 Israeli comedy film directed by Erez Tadmor. The film stars Amit Rahav, Maor Schweitzer and Liana Ayoun.

(Amit Rahav), a young Haredi Ashkenazi man creates family tensions by wanting to date Nechama (Liat Ayoun), who is Mizrahi.

The series is followed by the sequels: Matchmaking 2 (2024) and the upcoming Matchmaking 3 (2026). Niv Sultan stars in both sequels, with Yadin Gellman joining the third installment.

== Plot summary ==
Set in Jerusalem's Haredi community, where Shidduch is commonplace, matchmaker Malki (Irit Kaplan) and her deputy Baruch (Maor Schweitzer) are on hand.

Moti (Amit Rahav), a young Ashkenazi man creates family tensions by wanting to date Nechama (Liat Ayoun), who is Mizrahi. As they battle their own prejudices, both families realise that they only want the best for their children.

== Cast ==
- Amit Rahav as Moti
- Maor Schweitzer as Baruch
- Liana Ayoun as Nechama
- Irit Kaplan as Malki
- Roy Assaf as Nechama's father
- Reymond Amsalem as Nechama's mother
- Guy Loel as Moti's father
- Netta Shpigelman as Moti's mother

== Reception ==
The film was praised by critic Jessica Steinberg, writing in The Times of Israel: "The anthropological side of the film is also a draw, with its detailed unveiling of the matchmaking process taking place in hotel lobbies and at dining room tables, a taste of which audiences may have already experienced in Rama Burshtein’s films or Netflix’s Shtisel."
