= Victory (2023 film) =

- המנצחים
- Directed by: Eliran Peled
- Written by: Yonatan Blumenfeld; Eliran Peled
- Produced by: Moshe Edery; Michael Sharfstein
- Starring: Daniel Litman; Yael Sztulman; Amit Farkash; Yadin Gellman
- Cinematography: Saar Mizrahi
- Edited by: Yosef Grunfeld; Roy Hornshtein
- Music by: Daniel Markovich; Ran Shem-Tov; Ben Zeadman
- Distributed by: United King Films
- Release date: October 2023
- Running time: 114 minutes
- Country: Israel
- Language: Hebrew

Victory (Hebrew: המנצחים) is a 2023 Israeli musical film directed by Eliran Peled. The film stars Daniel Litman, Yael Sztulman, Amit Farkash and Yadin Gellman as two couples amid the euphoria of Israel's victory over Egypt, Syria and Jordan in the 1967 Six-Day War. The film is based on real events and real characters.

Victory premiered at the Haifa International Film Festival in October 2023, where it was nominated for Best Film, and went into wide theatrical release in February 2024. The film received critical acclaim in Israel, with critics commending its surprising complexity and portrayal of PTSD. It was nominated for four Ophir Awards, and won for Best Music.

== Plot summary ==
Amid the euphoria of Israel's victory in the 1967 Six-Day War, the lives of two couples from Kibbutz Netzer Sereni change significantly. Amos Agmon (Litman) returns home, changed by the war and traumatized. Meanwhile, Yael (Farkash) is made a widow following the death of Shlomo (Gellman) during the war. Amos and his wife Neta (Sztulman), relocate to Tel Aviv so that Neta can pursue her acting ambitions.

The couple struggle to reconnect amid Neta's burgeoning theatre success and Agmon's unacknowledged trauma. Yael comes to rely on her friend at the Kibbutz, Ilan (Rothman) and they become a couple, raising Yael and Shlomo's young daughter together. Agmon returns alone to the Kibbutz and Neta decides to quit her starring role in a play to follow him. Yael and Ilan get married at the Kibbutz. Agmon arranges for Neta to keep working as an actress at the Kibbutz, by hosting a Tel Aviv fringe theatre group that casts Neta in Hanoch Levin's You, Me And The Next War.

== Cast ==
- Daniel Litman as Amos Agmon
- Yael Sztulman as Neta Agmon
- Amit Farkash as Yael Harlap
- Yadin Gellman as Shlomo Harlap
- Yoav Rotman as Ilan Rechavam
- Dor Harari as Mike
- Sharon Alexander as Yakov Agmon

== Production ==
Peled, co-writer and director, had worked on developing the film for seven years. He also researched and watched existing musical film projects: "We [Peled and co-writer Yonatan Blumenfeld] understood early in the writing process that if you want to make a musical, you need to respect the templates of the genre and understand the archetypes of the story you're telling."

A total of 14 songs original songs written for the film were used and sung by the actors and a choir. The soundtrack was recorded with an orchestra in Vienna and with many musicians in Israel.

The film was shot in Israel and abroad, between June 2021 and December of the same year. The film received financial support from the Rabinowitz Foundation for the Arts, the Kader Foundation, Channel 13, the Ukrainian Ministry of Culture and private investors.

Parts of the film were re-edited in the wake of the 7 October attacks on Israel. Yadin Gellman, one of the film's leads was also the first Israeli celebrity casualty of the war, sustaining serious injuries amid the Be'eri massacre.

Lior Waitzman, one of the film's sound designers, was killed during the Battle of Sderot on October 7th.

Lapid character, Amos is based on the paratrooper, Michael Lanir, whom Peleg got to know and learned he and other returning soldiers has suffered from PTSD. Peleg was also drawn to this theme after a close family member returned from the 2014 Gaza War with severe PTSD.

== Release ==
The film received its premiere, as part of the official competition at Haifa International Film Festival in October 2023. The slated theatrical release in November 2023 was postponed due to the outbreak of the Gaza war. It was subsequently released in Israeli theaters on 8 February 2024.

== Reception ==
Allison Kaplan Sommer described the film as "highly original" in Haaretz, continuing: ""Victory" is deeply relevant to today's Israel, offering a stylized but piercing look at how war shapes Israeli society, devastates and transforms the lives of young people, and continues to dismay parents who dreamed of happier and safer lives for their children."

It won the Ophir Award for Best Music from the Israeli Film Academy, and was nominated for three other awards from the academy, including Best Sound, Best Costume Design and Best Art Direction. It was also nominated for the Best Film prize at the Haifa International Film Festival.
