= Amit Rahav =

Israeli actor

- עמית רהב
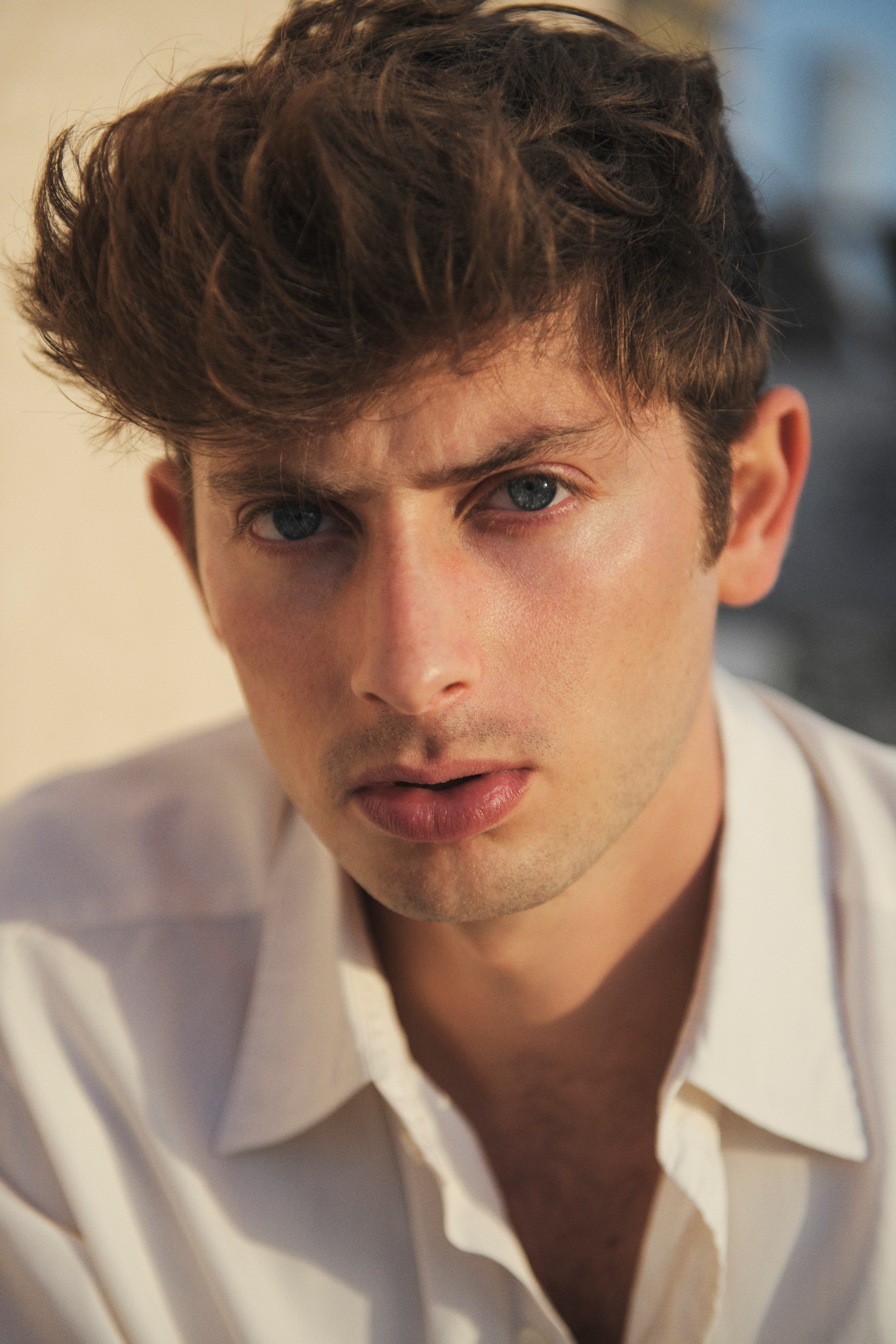
- Born: 9 August 1995 (age 31); Tel Aviv, Israel
- Occupation: Actor
- Years active: 2014–present

Amit Rahav (Hebrew: עמית רהב; born 9 August 1995) is an Israeli actor.

A graduate of Yoram Loewenstein Performing Arts Studio in Tel Aviv, he began his career on the Israeli stage. He landed his first TV role in Mishpacha Sholetet (2014–2016). He became known to international audiences for his role as Yanky Shapiro in the Netflix miniseries Unorthodox (2020). He has since starred in the Netflix miniseries Transatlantic (2023) and the Holocaust family drama limited series, We Were the Lucky Ones (2024) for Hulu.

== Early life ==
Rahav was born in Tel Aviv, Israel to a British mother and Israeli father, and he grew up in an English-speaking household. His parents are divorced. He was raised as a secular Jew and continues to define himself as such. His grandmother is a Holocaust survivor.

He was a drama counselor in Clayton, Georgia at Camp Ramah Darom for three months in summer 2016 through the Jewish Agency for Israel.

== Career ==
Since he left the military, Rahav has appeared in various movies and television shows. His first significant role was on the Israeli TV show, Mishpacha Sholetet, and he has since acted in various other Israeli shows. In 2015, he appeared in two episodes of the American thriller TV series Dig.

In 2016, he appeared in Flashback, an Israeli show for teenagers. He made history, as his character, Aviv was the first on an Israeli teen show to come out as gay.

In 2021, Rahav starred as Yanky Shapiro in the German-American Netflix original miniseries Unorthodox. In April 2020, he signed with talent agency Lighthouse Management & Media.

In 2021, he played the protagonist, Yehonatan alongside Daniel Litman in The One My Soul Loves at the Habima Theatre. The play is based on the true events of the Tel Aviv gay centre shooting and deals with conversion therapy. He returned to the role for a special performance at Nicosia Municipal Theatre in Nicosia in Cyprus in October 2022 and then for a second run at Habima Theatre in December 2023.

In 2022 he starred in the Haredi comedy film, Matchmaking. In 2024, he starred in a sequel to the film, alongside Niv Sultan.

== Personal life ==
Rahav is a graduate of the Yoram Loewenstein Performing Arts Studio in Tel Aviv. He took time off school to film Unorthodox and had to re-audition to continue attending.

Rahav and his Unorthodox co-star Shira Haas have been friends since 2010, after meeting at a party at age 15. The two are neighbors in Tel Aviv.

He speaks fluent Hebrew and English, and he is a vegetarian. He has Israeli and British nationality.

In 2024, he relocated to Los Angeles.

== Filmography ==
=== Television ===
Year	Title	Role	Notes	Ref.
2014-2016	Mishpacha Sholelet	Hanan	Occurring character	
2015	Dig	Aaron	2 episodes USA Network TV series	
2015	L'Hitgaber		Israeli teen TV series	
2015	Total Drama Presents: The Ridonculous Race	Mickey	Hebrew voiceover	
2016	Wild Horses	Nadav	1 episode	
2016	Flashback	Aviv	Israeli teen TV series	
2018	Trening	Stav	Israeli children's series	
2020	Cash Register	Michael Eshet Bloom	1 episode	
2020	Unorthodox	Yanky Shapiro	Main role Netflix miniseries	
2023	Transatlantic	Thomas Lovegrove	Netflix miniseries	
2024	We Were the Lucky Ones	Jakob	Hulu limited series	

=== Film ===
Year	Title	Role	Notes	Ref.
2018	The Damned	Aviv	Israeli film	
2022	Matchmaking	Moti	Israeli film	
2024	Matchmaking 2	Aviv	Israeli film	

== Stage ==
Year	Title	Role	Venue	Ref.
2021	The One My Soul Loves	Yehonatan	Habima Theatre	

== Awards ==
Year	Organization	Category	Nominated work	Result
2021	Independent Spirit Awards	Best Male Performance in a New Scripted Series	Unorthodox	Won
