= Tel Aviv gay centre shooting =

2009 shooting at an Israeli gay centre that resulted in two deaths

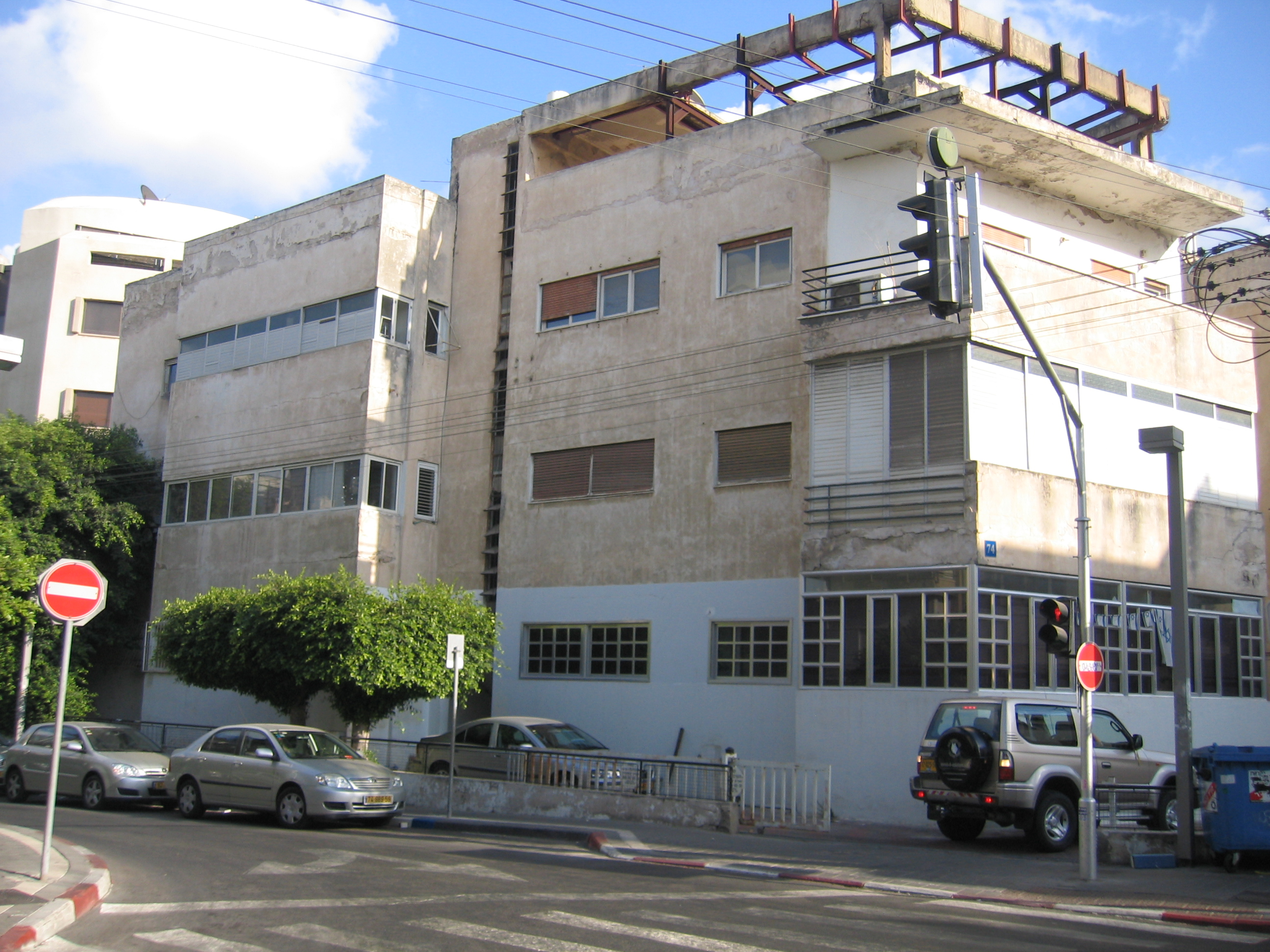
- The Aguda building in Tel Aviv, 18 days before the attack took place.
- Native name: הרצח בברנוער
- Location: 32°03′56″N 34°46′34″E; Tel Aviv branch of The Aguda (Israeli LGBT Association), Nahmani Street, Tel Aviv, Israel
- Date: August 1, 2009; 22:40
- Attack type: Mass shooting
- Deaths: 2
- Injuries: 15+
- Perpetrator: Unknown

The Tel Aviv gay centre shooting resulted in the deaths of two people and injuries to at least fifteen others at the Tel Aviv branch of the Israeli LGBT Association, at the "Bar-Noar" (Hebrew: בר נוער, "Youth Bar"), on Nahmani Street, on August 1, 2009. A 26-year-old man and a 17-year-old girl were killed. Three deaths were mentioned in earlier reports of the incident but one has since been discounted; in 2020, shooting survivor Chen Langer died by suicide after following a long battle with PTSD resulting from the attack, becoming the third deadly casualty.

Most of the injured were minors; six were in serious condition. The city was subject to a "clampdown" after the attack, and several hundred police launched a manhunt to locate the killer(s). In June 2013, Hagai Felician was charged over the murder, but the police retracted its allegations in March 2014, after revealing its key witness fabricated evidence.

The shooting sparked widespread condemnation, with one lawmaker calling it the worst attack against the gay community in Israel's history. The location of the attack— at the heart of what is seen as Israel's most liberal city—resulted in protests by the gay community.

As of 2026, the police have yet to apprehend the shooter.

== Shooting ==
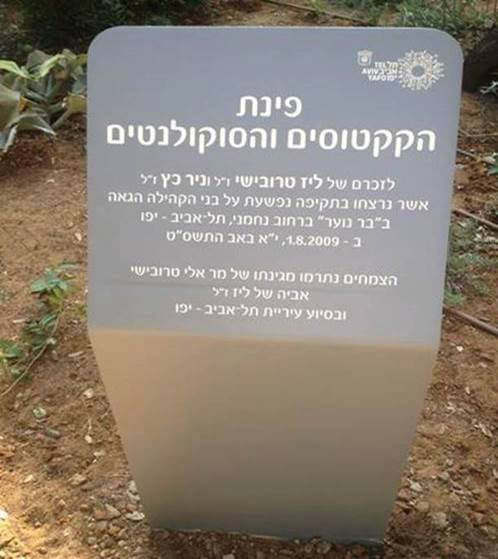
Cactus and Succulent plants memorial garden, near the gay center of Tel Aviv, in memory of Liz Troubishi and Nir Katz, murdered in the Tel Aviv gay centre shooting. The plants were donated from the private garden of Eli Troubishi, Liz's father

On the evening of August 1 at around 23:00, an unknown person with firearms entered the Aguda building in Tel Aviv, opened fire on the crowd attending a "Youth Get Together" event, and immediately escaped by foot. Two people were killed, and fifteen were wounded. Police launched a search campaign to find the shooter, and in addition immediately closed most entertainment locations for the gay community that operated during the same time of the shooting for fear of additional shooting.

The building was frequented by gay teenagers who engaged in social activities and listened to music. The centre was small with one terrace, thus preventing anyone from escaping. Attendees instead hid under a bed and tables as shots were fired. Israeli television said the crime scene was a "bloodbath". Five of the injured were treated at Tel Aviv Sourasky Medical Center, while five were treated at Wolfson Medical Center in Holon.

The shooter was masked, dressed in black and used a pistol to carry out the attack. It was not believed his motive was related to nationalist terrorism. The city's gay community stated the killer had a homophobic motive, while police criticized them for rushing to make declarations about prejudice being the cause. Police were also investigating leads that the attack may have been due to a personal feud.

== Victims ==
The dead were named as 26-year-old Nir Katz from Givatayim and 17-year-old Liz Troubishi from Holon. One 16-year-old victim spoke of his fear that the shooting would cause an effect of enforced outing as parents find out their children are gay. Chen Langer, the most badly injured victim, who became outspoken after the shooting, died by suicide on 15 of June 2020 as a result of the long battle with PTSD resulting from the attack. He officially became a third victim of the shooting.

== Investigation ==
A manhunt was immediately launched in an attempt to locate the gunman. Roadblocks were set up in the city. Police shut down all other gay clubs and buildings that had homosexual connections near the crime scene immediately after the shooting in case there were further attacks. Hundreds of police officers were conducting street and door-to-door searches in the city.

Police soon discarded the possibility that the shooting was a "terror attack" (meaning it was not an incident of Palestinian political violence). Police in Tel Aviv accompanied a teenaged survivor of the attack to the basement to conduct a reenactment on 3 August 2009.

== Aftermath ==
A protest rally was held in Tel Aviv following the shooting, including lit candles, which are a symbol of mourning in Jewish culture.

A few hours after the event, a demonstration of a few hundred people took place on Rothschild Boulevard in Tel Aviv, and the protesters marched towards Allenby Street, and King George Street until they reached Tel Aviv Municipal LGBT Community Center, in Meir Park, and on the way chanted "Inciting homophobes, children's blood is on your hands." The next day, at 17:00 pm, an additional demonstration took place on Rothschild Boulevard. Protest watches were held in Haifa City, Zion Square of Jerusalem, and the government complex of Beer-Sheba.

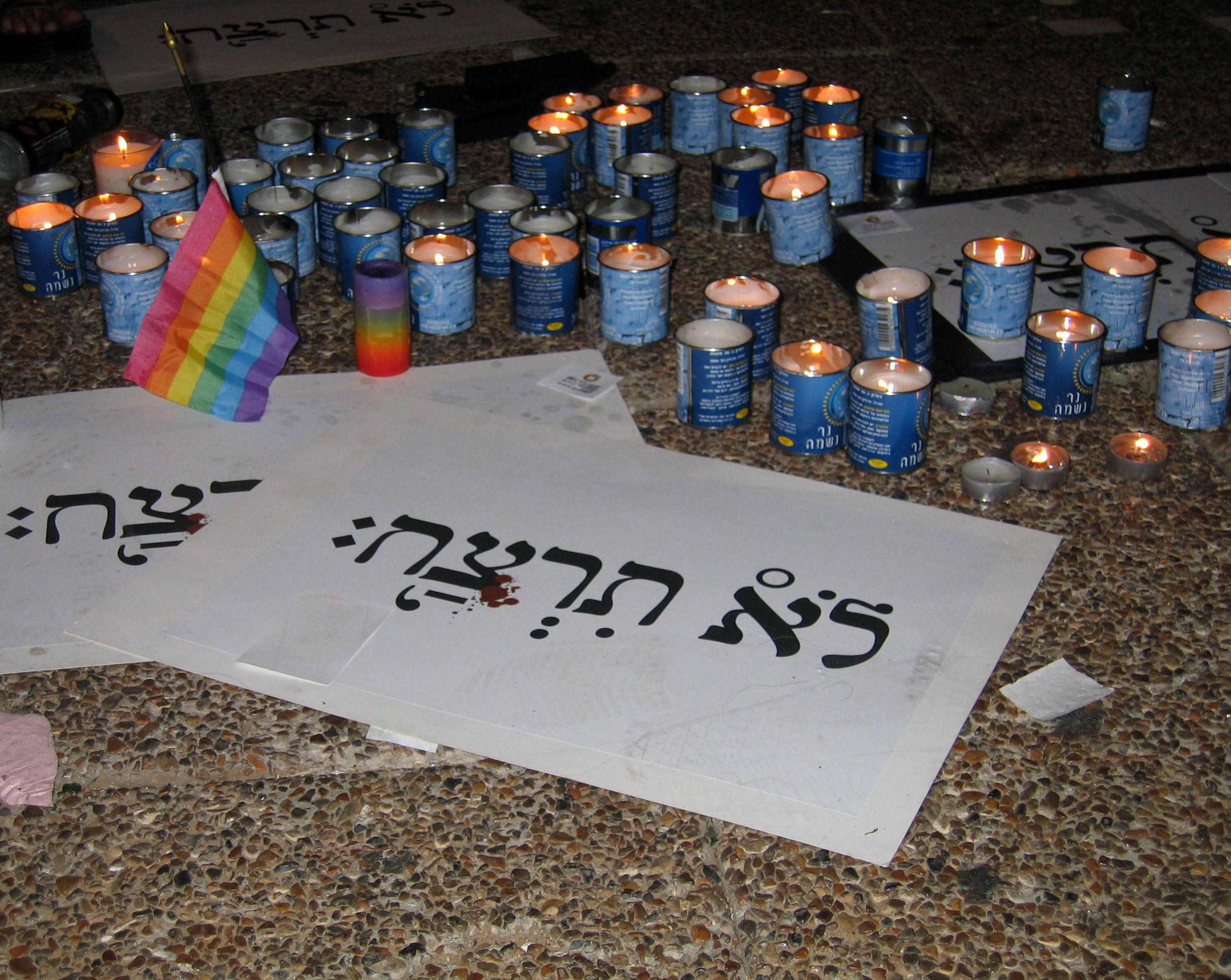
Yahrzeit candles and signs entitled "You shall not murder" at the rally at Rabin Square on 8 August 2009.

A week after the murder, on August 8, a solidarity rally was held in Rabin Square in Tel Aviv. Twenty thousand demonstrators or more gathered to show solidarity with Israel's gay community, including the victims shot at the center. President Shimon Peres addressed the crowd, saying the shots fired at the gay and lesbian community "hurt all of us – as people, as Jews, as Israelis." Also attending the rally were Minister of Education Gideon Sa'ar, Minister of Culture Limor Livnat, Minister of Welfare & Social Services Isaac Herzog, various Knesset members, and Israeli singers such as Rita, Dana International, Ninet Tayeb, Keren Peles, Ivri Lider and Margalit Tzan'ani. In Jerusalem, members of the LGBT community lit candles at Zion Square in a tribute to the victims at a vigil.

== Legal ==
=== Hagai Felician case ===
Following a police investigation lasting nearly four years, three suspects were arrested. Their arrests were announced on 5 June 2013. A gag order was placed on the details of the investigation. The three suspects, all residents of Pardes Katz, a neighborhood in Bnei Brak, ranged in ages from 20 to 40. It was later announced that a prominent activist in the Israeli LGBT community had also been detained for questioning.

The Jerusalem Post reported that the shooting was planned by two young men, one of whom believed his teenaged relative had been abused by an activist at the Bar-Noar center. After the shooting, the gunman and his accomplice fled into Tel Aviv. The pistol (a Tanfoglio 9mm) used by the killer was found by hikers in December 2012 and the suspects were arrested some months later.

On June 11, the gag order was officially lifted. According to police, a few months before the killings, one of the suspects, then 15 years old, came to Bar-Noar struggling with his sexual identity. There he met with a veteran Bar-Noar figure, the fourth person to be arrested in the case. Hagai Felician, the teenager's relative, became aware that the teen had been seen a few times at Bar-Noar, and asked him what he was doing there. The teenager confirmed he had been going there, and that he was raped by the senior figure at the club. Felician allegedly decided to take matters into his own hands, and together with another suspect, Tarlan Hankishayev, and the state's witness, plotted to harm the activist. On the day of the shooting, Felician allegedly came to Bar-Noar looking for the activist. Unable to find him, Felician "lost it" and shot those present.

On 23 June 2013, charges were dropped against the other two suspects. On 10 July 2013, Hagai Felician was indicted on two counts of murder.

In February 2014, the prosecution's case against Hagai Felician collapsed after new information was uncovered that suggested that the state witness around whose testimony the case had been built had lied. Subsequently, the witness, who was identified in media reports as "Z" due to his identity being under gag order, was arrested on charges of fabricating evidence. On the 26th of February, Felician was released, although he was remanded to house arrest until April 2. On March 9, 2014, all charges against Felician were dropped.

=== Yaakov Felician rape case ===
On 24 June 2013, it was cleared for publication that Felician's brother, Yaakov, had been arrested on rape charges, and was suspected of raping a female attorney who had applied to serve as part of Hagai's defense team. Under police interrogation, Yaakov Felician claimed that the attorney had only filed a rape complaint after he did not hire her to serve on his brother's defense team. He was released to house arrest after a polygraph test reportedly claimed he was being truthful, although polygraphs are widely considered pseudoscientific and cannot be used to determine truthfulness of statements.

== Reaction ==
Pride flag with a black "mourning ribbon". This flag was common after the shooting as a mark of mourning and identification with the victims.

=== Political reaction ===
The murderous event was broadly covered by the Israeli media, and was widely condemned by many public figures. President Shimon Peres reacted to the murder, stating that "[t]he horrifying murder that was carried out yesterday in Tel Aviv, against teenagers and young people, is a murder that civilized and enlightened people cannot accept. Murder and hatred are the two most serious crimes in society. The police must exert great efforts in order to catch the despicable murderer, and the entire nation must unite in condemning this abominable act." Peres called the culprit a "lowly criminal" and urged the police to apprehend him quickly.

On August 8, a week after the shooting, Prime Minister Benjamin Netanyahu came to the crime scene at Bar-Noar to show support for the community and the deadly attack on it. He condemned the murder at the opening of his Cabinet meeting and expressed his "shock and dismay," condemning the "shocking murder" and reminding Israeli citizens that "we are a democratic and tolerant country and we must respect every person as he is."

Nitzan Horowitz, the only openly gay member of the Knesset at the time, condemned it as "the worst attack ever against the gay community in Israel [...] a blind attack against innocent youths."

The Shas party said they were "shocked and bereaved, and denounce without reservation the murderous incident." Public Security Minister Yitzhak Aharonovich, head of Israel's police force, called it "a serious and grave incident." Aharonovitch spoke of going to the crime scene, saying "it was a difficult sight."

Opposition leader Tzipi Livni called it a "grave incident", saying "even if all the details surrounding the event are not yet clear, the hatred exists and must be dealt with". She said it should "awaken society to rid itself of prejudice" and "shake up society, and all the circles inherent in it, including the political establishment and the education system, and on this day deliver an unequivocal message against intolerance, incitement and violence, and to act against any manifestation of these".

The Mayor of Tel Aviv, Ron Huldai, said his city would still welcome members of the gay and lesbian community, saying they would fight for their rights to live. Tel Aviv's Head of Police, Shachar Ayalon, did not say the shooting was a hate crime.

=== International reaction ===
On August 3, 2009, more than 150 Jewish and LGBT people held a candlelight vigil in the Dupont Circle neighborhood of Washington, D.C., the capital of the United States. Rabbis and Jewish community leaders representing Orthodox, Conservative, and Reform congregations were among those in attendance. On 3 August 2009, more than 100 people held a memorial service at the San Francisco LGBT Center organized by the LGBT Alliance of the Jewish Community Federation of San Francisco, the Peninsula, Marin & Sonoma Counties and the Jewish Community Federation of the Greater East Bay. Rabbi Camille Shira Angel from Congregation Sha'ar Zahav, Supervisor Bevan Dufty, among others, spoke in condemnation of the violence.

On August 31, 2009, a cousin of Nir Katz organized a candlelight vigil with the Vancouver Hillel Foundation in honor of the victims at the Vancouver Art Gallery in Vancouver, British Columbia, Canada. The evening's service drew about 100 people and served as a rally against hate crimes. This vigil also served to mark Shloshim, which in the Jewish tradition is a service to mark the end of the 30-day mourning period following the death. A video recording of this vigil can be found on YouTube.com under the title "Vancouver Vigil – In Memory of Nir Katz (1983–2009) Parts 1 through 5". A separate vigil was held in Toronto. A rally to condemn the shootings was held in Berlin.

== See also ==
- LGBT rights in Israel
- Violence against LGBT people
