= Avigail (given name) =

Avigail is a Hebrew feminine given name, the native Hebrew spelling of "Abigail". Notable people with the name include:

- Avigail Alfatov (born 1996), Israeli national fencing champion, soldier, and Miss Israel 2014
- Avigail Sperber (born 1973), Israeli cinematographer
- Avigail Kovari (born 1987), Israeli singer, musician, and television and film actress
- Olga Avigail Mieleszczuk, Israeli singer, accordion player and researcher of Eastern European musical folklore

== See also ==
- Abigail (name), other variants
