= Golden Voices =

2019 Israeli comedy-drama film

- קולות רקע
- Directed by: Evgeny Ruman
- Written by: Ziv Berkovich; Evgeny Ruman
- Starring: Maria Belkin; Vladimir Friedman; Evelin Hagoel
- Cinematography: Ziv Berkovich
- Edited by: Evgeny Ruman
- Production companies: United Channels Movies and Evanstone Films
- Distributed by: Music Box Films
- Release date: 2019
- Running time: 88 minutes
- Country: Israel
- Languages: Hebrew, Russian

Golden Voices (Original title Hebrew: קולות רקע, romanized: Kolot Reka'a, lit. 'Background Voices') is a 2019 Israeli comedy-drama film directed by Evgeny Ruman, who co-wrote the screenplay with Ziv Berkovich.

The film stars Maria Belkin, Vladimir Friedman, and Evelin Hagoel. It follows an aging couple of celebrated Soviet voice actors who struggle to reinvent their personal and professional identities after immigrating to Israel during the 1990 collapse of the Soviet Union.

The film premiered at the 2019 Tallinn Black Nights Film Festival, where it won the Best Script Award and the NETPAC Award for Best Film. Domestically, the film received four Ophir Award nominations from the Israeli Film Academy, including Best Actress for Maria Belkin and Best Supporting Actress for Evelin Hagoel.

It was released to critical acclaim, earning a 100% approval rating on Rotten Tomatoes. Critics praised its witty treatment of cultural displacement, its performances, and its thematic tribute to classic cinema.

== Plot ==
For decades, husband and wife Victor and Raya Frenkel were celebrated voice-over and dubbing actors of the Soviet Union, responsible for voicing all major Western Hollywood releases for Soviet audiences. In 1990, following the collapse of the USSR, the Jewish couple decides to make aliyah and immigrate to Israel alongside hundreds of thousands of other Soviet immigrants.

Upon arriving in Tel Aviv, they are hit with the harsh reality of cultural displacement. They discover there is absolutely no professional demand for Russian-language theatrical dubbing artists in their new homeland. Desperate to secure an income and preserve their dignity, the couple's professional and personal lives begin to diverge, triggering significant marital strain.

Raya secretly takes a job as a telephone sex operator for a local agency run by her new boss, Dvora. Relying on her trained vocal adaptability, she finds financial success but hides the true nature of her work from her proud husband. Meanwhile, Victor struggles to adapt. He eventually finds employment working with local bootleggers and video pirates, using his talent to dub illegal VHS tapes of classic European arthouse and Hollywood films for the local Russian-speaking black market. As both struggle to navigate their secret jobs and reinvent their identities against the backdrop of the early 1990s geopolitical shift, their absurd and painful experiences force them to confront whether their shared love of cinema can preserve their fractured relationship.

As the Gulf War intensifies and Scud missile alerts force the population into sealed rooms with gas masks, the physical and emotional distance between the couple reaches a breaking point. Raya's identity is eventually exposed to Victor, forcing them to confront the reality of their altered lives. Realizing that they cannot recapture their past glory in the Soviet Union, they find a fragile reconciliation through their enduring connection to voice work and cinema, ultimately accepting their new roles within the shifting cultural landscape of Israel.

== Cast ==
- Maria Belkin as Raya Frenkel
- Vladimir Friedman as Victor Frenkel
- Evelin Hagoel as Dvora

== Production ==
=== Development and writing ===
The screenplay for Golden Voices was co-written by the film's director, Evgeny Ruman, alongside the film's primary cinematographer, Ziv Berkovich. The text of the narrative script earned the Best Script Award and the Network for the Promotion of Asian Cinema Award for Best Film during its festival run at the 2019 Tallinn Black Nights Film Festival.

=== Themes and influences ===
The script is set against the wave of aliyah following the collapse of the Soviet Union in 1990, examining themes of cultural displacement, linguistic barriers, and the sudden loss of professional identity within the immigrant community. The movie functions as a cinematic tribute to mid-century classic Hollywood and European cinema, emphasizing the characters' former prestigious history translating and dubbing works by filmmakers Federico Fellini and Stanley Kubrick.

=== Financing and backing ===
The project was funded and produced by United Channels Movies and Evanstone Films. Production elements and commercial backing for the film were organized by a cooperative group of Israeli film executives.

== Release ==
Golden Voices had its world premiere at the Tallinn Black Nights Film Festival in November 2019. The film then made rounds across the film festival circuit, including wide releases and distribution dates across Lithuania in October 2020 and Australia in March 2021. The film was acquired for North American theatrical distribution by Music Box Films. It received a limited domestic theatrical release in the United States on October 8, 2021. Music Box Home Entertainment later released the film on home media formats, debut digital video-on-demand services, and physical media on January 25, 2022.

== Critical reception ==
Golden Voices received critical acclaim. On the review aggregator website Rotten Tomatoes, the film holds an approval rating of 100% based on 18 reviews, with an average rating of 7.6/10.

Critics highly praised the film's gentle, witty treatment of the hardships of immigration, its tribute to classic cinema, and the performances of its lead actors. Writing for The New York Times, Beatrice Loayza highlighted the central irony of the plot, noting how the characters' talents are recontextualized as they navigate Tel Aviv while dealing with relationship tensions and artistic integrity.

In his review for RogerEbert.com, Carlos Aguilar awarded the film three out of four stars, commending its balance of cultural displacement, the loss of professional identity, and marital reinvention against the backdrop of the early 1990s collapse of the USSR. Alissa Simon of Variety characterized the film as low-key but deeply evocative, focusing heavily on how a shared love of cinema serves as a constant variable in the characters' tumultuous lives.

== Accolades ==
Year	Festival / Ceremony	Category	Recipient(s)	Result
2019	Ophir Awards	Best Actress	Maria Belkin	Nominated
2019	Ophir Awards	Best Supporting Actress	Evelin Hagoel	Nominated
2019	Ophir Awards	Best Casting	Madeline Ostrovsky	Nominated
2019	Ophir Awards	Best Art Direction	Sandra Gutman	Nominated
2019	Tallinn Black Nights Film Festival	Grand Prix for Best Film	Evgeny Ruman, Avraham Pirchi, Chilik Michaeli, Tami Leon, Eitan Evan	Nominated
2019	Tallinn Black Nights Film Festival	Best Script	Evgeny Ruman and Ziv Berkovich	Won
2019	Tallinn Black Nights Film Festival	NETPAC Award for Best Film	Evgeny Ruman	Won
2019	Tallinn Black Nights Film Festival	Special Mention (Youth Jury)	Golden Voices	Won
2019	Haifa International Film Festival	Best Israeli Feature Film	Golden Voices	Nominated
2019	Haifa International Film Festival	Special Mention	Golden Voices	Won
2020	Bari International Film Festival	International Panorama Award for Best Director	Evgeny Ruman	Won
2020	Bari International Film Festival	International Panorama Special Mention	Maria Belkin	Won
2020	UK Jewish Film Festival	Dorfman Best Film Award	Golden Voices	Won
2020	Beijing International Film Festival	Tiantan Award for Best Film	Golden Voices	Nominated

- 2019 Haifa International Film Festival, honorable mention for Evgeny Ruman
- 2019 Tallinn Black Nights Film Festival, 6 nominations, 2 wins.
- 2020 Bari International Film Festival, International Panorama Awards, Best Film Director, Evgeny Ruman: "Evgeny Ruman skillfully combines light-heartedness and depth in a film that addresses universal topics – such as the bewilderment of immigration – through an original script, developed with keen dramaturgical talent and highlighting a masterful balance between comedy, melodrama and sentimental drama, while also paying a clear tribute to Federico Fellini’s work."
- 2020 Bari International Film Festival, International Panorama Awards, Special Mention to the actress, Maria Belkin: "For her ability to take us on an extraordinary emotional journey and personal discovery undertaken by a woman who manages to attain a new life, while gradually embracing a different, as well as unpredictable and lively version of herself."

== See also ==
- Russian language in Israel
