= Dark Night (2005 film) =

Dark Night (also known as Layla Affel) is an Israeli short film directed by Leonid Prudovsky.

== Title ==
The title refers to a tune that one of the Israeli soldiers whistles, the famous Soviet war song Тёмная ночь (lit. Dark Night).

== Plot ==
Three Israeli soldiers are out on patrol when their jeep runs over a landmine. They are then ambushed, and two of them manage to escape. The two surviving soldiers break into the house of a Palestinian couple and take them hostage as they wait to be rescued. They must navigate a language barrier and mutual mistrust if they want to all survive the night.

== Crew ==
- Writer/director: Leonid Prudovsky;
- Producer: Rafael Katz
- Executive Producer: Herzl Maar
- Photographer: Yisrael Friedman
- Editor: Evgeny Ruman.

The film stars: Eran Amichai, Johnny Arbid, Hanan Savyon, Pini Tavger, and Helena Yaralova.

== Awards and festivals ==
=== Awards ===
- 2005: nomination for Student Academy Award;
- 2005: special mention, best short film at 62nd Venice International Film Festival (Venice, Italy);
- 2005: best film award by Cittadella del Corto (Rome, Italy);
- 2005: Television Drama Award - Honorable Mention at Jerusalem Film Festival (Jerusalem, Israel);
- 2007: Silver Warsaw Phoenix in short film category at 4th Jewish Motifs International Film Festival (Warsaw, Poland).

=== Festivals (official selection) ===
- 2005: 62nd Venice International Film Festival (Venice, Italy);
- 2005: Cittadella del Corto (Rome, Italy);
- 2005: Jerusalem Film Festival (Jerusalem, Israel);
- 2006: Palm Springs International Shortfest;
- 2007: 4th Jewish Motifs International Film Festival (Warsaw, Poland);
