= Dark Is the Night (Soviet song) =

Soviet war song

External audio
- You may hear "Dark Night" sung by Sidor Belarsky with the Mischa Borr Orchestra and accordionist John Serry in 1946; Here on library.wisc.edu

"Dark Is the Night" (Russian: Тёмная ночь, romanized: Tyomnaya noch, IPA: [ˈtʲɵmnəjə ˈnotɕ], lit. 'Dark Night') is a Soviet song associated with the Great Patriotic War (the Eastern Front of World War II). Written by composer Nikita Bogoslovsky and poet Vladimir Agatov, it was initially produced for the 1943 war film Two Soldiers, where it was performed by Mark Bernes.

Leonid Utyosov, without the permission of the film crew, had also recorded the song, thus becoming the first to do so. However, it was Bernes' performance in the film that popularised it: in it, Bernes plays a soldier who recalls his wife and baby while singing at night.

The Soviet authorities disapproved of the song, stating that it propagated philistinism. However, despite it being ostracized, the song became a symbol of the war years for millions of Soviet people. Due to its popularity, the song was recorded for the RCA Victor label (#26-5037) by the vocalist Sidor Belarsky in collaboration with the orchestral accordionist John Serry and the Mischa Borr Orchestra in 1946.

"Dark Is the Night" has been described as "a gentle lyrical song imbued with a feeling of homesickness and expressing devotion to one's beloved" which helped "reveal the personal side of army life, indiscernable in the roar of warfare." It contrasted sharply with other war songs of its time, which were either marches or patriotic songs.

== Other performances ==
Apart from Bernes and Utyosov, the song was performed by Ivan Kozlovsky, Muslim Magomayev, Lyudmila Gurchenko, Jason Kouchak, Noize MC, Zemfira, Ivan Rebroff, Georg Malmstén, Basta, and Alexander Goldscheider among many others.

In translated versions it was popularized by Wiera Gran and Farhad among many others.

It was also performed by Vennaskond, an Estonian music group.

An Italian version of the song was written and performed in 2025 by the Apulian accordionist and singer-songwriter Pierpaolo Mingolla, professionally known as CEDRO.

== Film ==
"Dark is the Night" has been used in several films since its 1943 release.

In 1958 it was used in war films such as Andrzej Wajda's Ashes and Diamonds.

In Joseph Vilsmaier's Stalingrad (1993 film), the german division hear Soviet's soldiers singing the song in the ruins of the city. This is an anachronism as the song did not exist at that time.

In 2005, the song became a main motif and title of the Israeli film Dark Night by Leonid Prudovsky. The film gathered numerous prizes including special mention, best short film at 62nd Venice International Film Festival (2005) and Silver Warsaw Phoenix in short film category at 4th Jewish Motifs International Film Festival (2007) in Warsaw, Poland.

In 2006, the song was used as the main theme in the Swedish horror film Frostbite, foreshadowing the coming of vampires in a northern Swedish town.
