= Borderlessness =

Borderlessness may refer to:

- Borderless country, an insular territory over which a nation-state maintains sovereignty under international law, that does not share the land territory of any of its islands – See List of countries and territories by land borders; or

== See also ==
- Without Borders
