= Gan Kofim =

- Directed by: Avi Nesher
- Produced by: Moshe Edri
- Starring: Adir Miller; Shani Cohen; Yaniv Biton
- Cinematography: Ziv Berkovich
- Edited by: Isaac Sehayek
- Music by: Avner Dorman
- Release date: September 2023
- Running time: 120 minutes
- Country: Israel
- Language: Hebrew

Gan Kofim (Hebrew: גן קופים, lit. "The Monkey House") is an Israeli film directed by Avi Nesher, which was released in September 2023, inspired by the true story of Reuven Kritz, as described by Eli Eshed in his blog. The film depicts a writer in the late 1980s who has faded into obscurity and is trying to find his place again.

Avi Nesher and the comedian Yaniv Biton, who plays one of the supporting characters in the film, said that Gan Kofim will probably be produced in a new version in Hollywood.

== Plot ==
The film begins in December 1989, when Amitai Kriav (Adir Miller) arrives with his friend Avsha (Yaniv Biton) at the funeral of Yariv Naman, the husband of their friend from kibbutz days, Tamar Naman (Shani Cohen). At the same time, Kriav is informed that literature researcher Gal Shenar from Colorado will do her doctoral thesis on him, which will later be published as a book. He informs Tamar, who does not know that she has been his inspiration for writing all these years.

In Tel Aviv, Margo May (Suzanna Papian) is looking for work to save money and fly to Los Angeles, where she aspires to launch an acting career. In the meantime, she lives with her sister (Carmel Netzer) and her husband Razi (Avi Sarusi). One evening she meets Amir Haddad (Ala Dakka), an Israeli director who has returned from Rome to direct a documentary film in Israel. With him is Noora (Shira Naor), his producer.

Amitai hires Margo as his personal assistant in anticipation of Shenar's arrival, but a medical event prevents the literature researcher from coming to the country. Kriav and May devise a plan in which Margo will impersonate Gal Shenar and conduct the missing interviews for the doctoral thesis. Kriav offers her to live on the top floor of his house that he inherited from his doctor uncle in Ramat Gan, near the monkey house (Gan Shaul). They alter Margo's external appearance to match Shenar's looks.

Margo, posing as literature researcher Gal Shenar, interviews various people about Kriav, including literary critic Uri Hermon (Eran Zarahovitsh) who does not appreciate his books. Before the interview she meets Amir Haddad who is interviewing Hermon for his film on literature from both sides of the Israeli-Palestinian conflict. Amir and Noora recognize Margo but don't remember where from. Through Hermon, Amir asks Margo to meet him and be interviewed for his film.

Margo meets with Amir, they identify parallel lines in each other. On Amitai's advice, she offers to interview Kriav at the kibbutz where he grew up for the film. Amitai suggests that Tamar accompany him and Amir suggests that Margo come along too. They sleep at Avsha's house in the kibbutz and at night Margo and Amir sneak into the kibbutz pool and kiss there. The next day, Amitai is interviewed for the film and Noora gets confirmation that there is indeed a researcher named Gal Shenar in Colorado.

Amir has to leave the country and offers Margo to spend the last night with him, but Amitai intervenes noting her husband. Margo nevertheless takes from Amir a book about Fazulini. Margo tries to call Amir before he leaves the country back to Italy and identifies the picture of Gal Shenar at the neighborhood grocery store she is trying to call from. She discovers that the one pictured is the daughter of the grocery store owner, who indeed studies economics in Colorado. Margo confronts Kriav about fabricating the story and writing the dissertation about himself and Kriav retorts that writers will do anything to get attention.

Margo is persuaded and continues cooperating, even though Amir comes to say goodbye to her at Kriav's house. The book is published, Kriav gives Tamar the early edition to read and she understands his feelings towards her after all the years. Tamar and Amitai get closer and even move in together. In November 1990 Margo returns from Los Angeles to the country and stops in Rome to return Amir the book she took. Amir reveals to her that he discovered she was impersonating in a conversation with the real Gal Shenar. She apologizes and they spend a night together after he reveals that he is an Arab from Haifa and she reveals her true identity to him.

The years go by and in 1993 an Italian film directed by Haddad and starring Margo comes out with a story that resembles exactly Kriav's story, about an actress who impersonates a researcher to bring him back into the spotlight. In the film itself, Kriav is portrayed as manipulative and abusive towards Tamar. Kriav and Tamar watch the movie and Tamar leaves him after watching it. Margo arrives in Israel and threatens to expose to Hermon that the story is based on Kriav. Kriav plans to move abroad when Avsha comes to visit him. Kriav explains to Avsha why he acted that way and reminds him that Avsha also hides a secret, for which he comes once a month secretly to stay with him in the apartment.

Avsha comes out to Tamar and explains to her why Amitai acted that way. Tamar, in turn, approaches Margo and dissuades her at the last moment from revealing Kriav's true story. Margo is persuaded and Tamar returns to Kriav.

A decade later, in 2003, Tamar and Kriav arrive in Haifa for Christmas, Amitai hasn't even dared to hold her hand since. They coincidentally meet Amir and Margo. Margo persuades Amitai to get close to Tamar and they hold hands at the last moment of the film.
