= Ziv Berkovich =

Israeli cinematographer and screenwriter

- זיו ברקוביץ'
- Born: Genia Berkovich; April 5, 1984 (age 42); Kazakhstan, Soviet Union
- Citizenship: Israeli
- Education: Sam Spiegel Film and Television School
- Occupations: Cinematographer; Screenwriter
- Years active: 2008–present
- Known for: Absentia (2017), Golden Voices (2019), Tell Me Everything (2026), and Monument (2026).
- Awards: Cannes Film Festival Cinéfondation First Prize (2008); Haifa Film Festival Best Cinematography (2015); Vienna International Film Festival Best Cinematography (2018); Tallinn Black Nights Film Festival Best Script (2019)

Ziv Berkovich (Hebrew: זיו ברקוביץ'; sometimes spelled Berkovitz; born Genia Berkovich, April 5, 1984) is an Israeli cinematographer and screenwriter.

He is a graduate of the Sam Spiegel Film and Television School, and an America-Israel Cultural Foundation scholar. His films include the Cannes Film Festival Cinéfondation winner Himnon (Anthem; 2008), NO-ONE (2018)–which won the Best Cinematography Award at the Vienna International Film Festival, and the comedy-drama feature film Golden Voices (2019)–which garnered the Best Script Award (which he shared) and the NETPAC Best Film Award at the Tallinn Black Nights Film Festival. He has also received Ophir Award nominations for Best Cinematography for The Monkey House (2023) and Tell Me Everything (2026).

His most recent film is the 2026 American historical drama feature film Monument, which marked the return of director Bryan Singer. It stars Jon Voight and Joseph Mazzello, playing his character's son.

== Early life ==
Ziv Berkovich was born April 5, 1984, in Kazakhstan, then part of the Soviet Union, and is Jewish. At age six, in 1990, he immigrated with his family to Israel during the wave of post-Soviet aliyah.

In Israel, he grew up in Kfar Saba. He graduated with honors from the film program at Rabin High School in Kfar Saba. He then graduated in 2008 from the Sam Spiegel Film and Television School in Jerusalem. He received an America-Israel Cultural Foundation scholarship during his studies at the school.

== Career ==
=== Film ===
==== 2008–19 ====
Berkovich began his filmmaking career working on short films while studying at the Sam Spiegel Film and Television School. Among his early student cinematography credits was the short drama Himnon (Anthem; המנון, 2008), which won First Prize in the Cinéfondation competition at the 2008 Cannes Film Festival. He returned to the Cannes Film Festival twice more for the shorts Diploma (2009; winning third prize in the Cinéfondation competition in 2009) and Babaga (2012).

During his studies, Berkovich also photographed his first full-length feature film, the indie drama Good Boys (Yeladim Tovim; ילדים טובים, 2005), which earned him the Best Cinematography Award at the 2005 Tampa International Gay and Lesbian Film Festival. Following his graduation, his early feature cinematography expanded into Israeli cinema, including the indie dark comedy-drama Not in Tel Aviv (2012), which premiered at the 2012 Locarno Film Festival, his cinematography work on Shira Geffen's feature film Self Made (Boreg), which held its world premiere during the Critics' Week section at the 2014 Cannes Film Festival, and the maritime drama Home Port (Nemal Bayit; נמל בית, 2016), directed by Erez Tadmor.

For his work as the director of photography of the comedy-drama film The Women's Balcony (2016), critic Arthur Lazere highlighted Berkovich's framing of a key dramatic moment, writing that the characters' "vibrant determination finds expression in a silent sequence shot from above, as each leaves a building one at a time, opening a different-colored umbrella in the rain, resolute."

In 2019, Berkovich both co-wrote and served as director of photography for the comedy-drama feature film Golden Voices (Hebrew title: Kolot Reka; קולות רקע), collaborating with director Evgeny Ruman. The narrative follows an elderly married couple who were celebrated as the preeminent Soviet film voiceover dubbing artists before they immigrated to Israel in 1990 during the collapse of the Soviet Union, only to find that there was no professional demand for Russian-language voice acting in their new home. The film was praised for its tonal balance of bittersweet comedy and narrative depth. Brad Gullickson of Elements of Madness commended the film's artistic execution, noting that the feature is "radiantly shot and beautifully performed."

Their screenplay heavily mirrored the real-life background of both Berkovich and Ruman, who had immigrated to Israel as children from the former Soviet Union in 1990 and used their childhood memories of their parents' struggles to ground the film's script. Berkovich and Ruman recorded a feature-length commentary track for the film's home video release detailing how the story mirrored their own immigration experiences.

The international rollout of Golden Voices earned festival accolades, culminating at the 23rd Tallinn Black Nights Film Festival in Estonia, where Berkovich and Ruman won the Best Script award and the Network for the Promotion of Asian Cinema (NETPAC) Best Film prize.

==== 2020–present ====
Reviewing The Monkey House (2023), for which he was the cinematographer, Hannah Brown of The Jerusalem Post praised his visual contribution to the film, noting that "the cinematography by Ziv Berkovich emphasizes the contrast between shadows and brightness that is at the heart of the story."

In 2026, Berkovich served as the director of photography for the Israeli-French period drama feature film Tell Me Everything (Hebrew title: Independence; עצמאות), directed by Moshe Rosenthal. Set in Tel Aviv during the HIV pandemic in the late 1980s and early 1990s, the movie explores the toll of the crisis on a generation of young Israelis. To capture the aesthetic of the era on a limited 18-day shooting schedule, Berkovich designed a soft-focus, desaturated pastel color palette paired with vintage-tuned Angénieux Optimo Prime cinema lenses to create a visual style aimed at evoking a shared emotional memory rather than a harsh, hyper-realistic historical recreation. The film had its world premiere in the World Cinema Dramatic Competition at the Sundance Film Festival. Film critics lauded Berkovich's sensitive portraiture, atmospheric lighting, and the movie's blend of period aesthetics. The film won ten Ophir Awards, with Berkovich receiving the award for Best Cinematography.

Also in 2026, Berkovich served as the director of photography for the American historical drama feature film Monument, which marked the return of director Bryan Singer. Based on true events from 1999, the narrative follows real-life Israeli architect Yaakov Rechter (played by Jon Voight) and his idealistic son Amnon (played by Joseph Mazzello) as they are commissioned by diplomat Uri Lubrani (played by Alon Aboutboul) to design a monument in Lebanon honoring the fallen soldiers of the South Lebanon Army. Berkovich's cinematography was noted for capturing the harsh, escalating tensions surrounding the monument's construction—culminating in the structure's eventual demolition by Hezbollah militants just 36 hours after its completion.

=== Television ===
Berkovich also transitioned into television, shooting episodes for series across both global streaming platforms and domestic networks. His international credits include serving as a cinematographer on the third season of the American thriller drama series Absentia starring Stana Katic, which was distributed globally by Amazon Prime Video. He also was the cinematographer on the Netflix supernatural thriller series Cracow Monsters (originally produced under the working title Axis Mundi in Poland). Domestically, Berkovich photographed the psychological drama series Very Important Person starring Yehuda Levi. His work on the series resulted in consecutive nominations for Best Cinematography in a Drama Series at the Israeli Television Academy Awards.

== Filmography ==
=== Film ===
Year	Title	Role	Notes
2005	Good Boys	Cinematographer	Short film
2008	Himnon	Cinematographer	Short film
2009	Diploma	Cinematographer	Short film
2014	Self Made	Cinematographer	Feature film
2016	The Women's Balcony	Cinematographer	Feature film
2016	Home Port	Cinematographer	Feature film
2018	NO-ONE	Cinematographer	Feature film
2019	Golden Voices	Cinematographer, Co-writer	Feature film
2023	The Monkey House	Cinematographer	Feature film
2026	Tell Me Everything	Cinematographer	Feature film
2026	Monument	Cinematographer	Feature film

=== Television ===
Year	Title	Role	Notes
2014	Very Important Person	Co-creator, cinematographer	Season 1
2017	Absentia	Cinematographer	Season 1
2021	Embezzlement	Cinematographer	Miniseries
2022	Cracow Monsters	Cinematographer	Season 1
2022	Chanshi	Cinematographer	Season 1
2023	Sovietzka	Cinematographer	Season 1; Hebrew title: סובייצקא
2025	Motherland	Cinematographer	Miniseries; Hebrew title: Migrash HaRusim (מגרש הרוסים)
2026	HaMitmaheh	Cinematographer	Drama series

== Awards and nominations ==
Berkovich's cinematography and screenwriting work have been recognized at both domestic and international film festivals.

Year	Award / Festival	Category	Work	Result	Ref.
2005	Tampa International Gay and Lesbian Film Festival	Best Cinematography	Good Boys (Yeladim Tovim)	Won	
2008	Cannes Film Festival	Cinéfondation (First Prize)	Himnon (Anthem)	Won	
2008	Cannes Film Festival	Cinéfondation (Third Prize)	Diploma	Won	
2016	Haifa International Film Festival	Best Cinematography	Home Port	Won	
2018	Vienna International Film Festival	Best Cinematography	NO-ONE	Won	
2019	Tallinn Black Nights Film Festival	Best Script (shared with Evgeny Ruman)	Golden Voices	Won	
2019	Tallinn Black Nights Film Festival	NETPAC Best Film	Golden Voices	Won	
2023	Ophir Awards	Best Cinematography	The Monkey House	Nominated	
2026	Ophir Awards	Best Cinematography	Tell Me Everything	Won	
