= Esau (film) =

2019 drama film

- Directed by: Pavel Lungin
- Screenplay by: Pavel Lungin; Evgeny Ruman
- Based on: Esau by Meir Shalev
- Produced by: Serafima Kokhanovskaia; Pavel Lungin; Haim Mecklberg; Alexander Turkot; Estee Yacov-Mecklberg
- Starring: Harvey Keitel; Lior Ashkenazi; Mark Ivanir; Shira Haas; Yulia Peresild; Kseniya Rappoport
- Cinematography: Fred Kelemen
- Edited by: Tim Pavelko
- Music by: Katia Tchemberdji
- Production companies: 2-Team Productions; Pavel Lungin Studio
- Release dates: October 2019 (CineLibri); December 1, 2020 (United States)
- Running time: 110 minutes
- Country: Israel
- Language: English

Esau is a 2019 Russian-Israeli-British drama film directed by Pavel Lungin and starring Harvey Keitel and Shira Haas. It is based on Meir Shalev's novel of the same name.

This is Lungin's first English-language film. However, it is not the first film in which Lungin filmed and worked with Israeli actors; before it, he made the film "The Winner" and also directed the Russian adaptation Rodina of the series Prisoners of War.

The film tells the story of a 40-year-old writer who returns to his family home where he was raised, and he escaped after half a lifetime to face his brother, who stayed instead. After inheriting their family bakery and marrying the woman they both loved.

The film premiered at the 2019 Hong Kong Jewish Film Festival.

== Plot ==
As a teenager, Asu fled to America, denying his past while failing to establish new roots in his new home. Although he writes successful books about baking bread, he never feels he has become a true writer, remaining isolated in a large, empty house without a wife or children.

A late-night phone call from a familiar female voice changes his life, asking for his help with his ailing father. Returning home to Israel 20 years later, Asu must confront his past and his brother, Yaakov. Yaakov has become the head of the family, inheriting their father's bakery, raising children, and marrying Leah—the very woman both brothers had dreamed of when they were younger.

== Cast ==
- Shira Haas as Leah, Young Jacob's Wife
- Harvey Keitel as Abraham, Esau and Jacob's Father
  - Omri Raveh as Young Abraham
- Yuliya Peresild as Sarah, Esau and Jacob's Mother
- Mark Ivanir as Jacob, Esau's Brother
  - Lion Ravich as Young Jacob
- Kseniya Rappoport as Cheznous, Leah's Friend
- Lior Ashkenazi as Esau, Jacob's Brother
  - Yoav Rotman as Young Esau
- Omer Goldman as Romi, Leah and Jacob's Daughter
- Helena Yaralova as Tzviah, Leah's Mother
- Valery Smirnov as Michael, Grandfather
- Lola S. Frey as Kafrit
- Gila Almagor as Bulica
- Oren Rehany as Doctor

== Production ==
=== Development and writing ===
The film is an adaptation of the 1991 novel Esau by Israeli author Meir Shalev, which reinterprets the biblical story of Jacob and Esau from the Book of Genesis within a modern context. Russian filmmaker Pavel Lungin directed the film, marking his English-language directorial debut.

The film's screenplay was co-written by Lungin alongside Israeli filmmaker Evgeny Ruman, who collaborated to translate the source text into an English-language script. Lungin noted a personal connection to the source text due to his Jewish heritage. The project represented the first time one of Shalev's books has been adapted into a feature film.

=== Casting and filming ===
The project was produced by 2-Team Productions alongside Lungin's own production banner. Production began in early April 2018, and principal photography took place on location across central Israel and southern Israel. Filming concluded in May 2018 after a one-month shooting schedule. German cinematographer Fred Kelemen served as the director of photography.

The international cast includes Harvey Keitel, Lior Ashkenazi, Shira Haas, Yulia Peresild, and Kseniya Rappoport, alongside a cameo appearance by Israeli theater actress Gila Almagor.

== Release ==
Esau was shown at festivals, beginning with its North American premiere at the Miami Jewish Film Festival in January 2020. It subsequently screened at other events, including the Moscow International Film Festival, the Shanghai International Film Festival, and the Tallinn Black Nights Film Festival. The film also had regional premieres at the Pacific Meridian International Film Festival in Vladivostok and the Hong Kong Jewish Film Festiva] in October 2020, followed by a selection at the Jewish International Film Festival in Australia in early 2021. In September 2021, the film featured at the 24th Religion Today Film Festival, where it won the international jury's Grand Prize for Best Film.

Following its festival run, it received a limited digital and video-on-demand release in the United States on December 1, 2020.

== Accolades ==
The film received recognition at international film festivals:

Year	Award / Festival	Category	Nominee(s)	Result	Ref.
2019	CineLibri International Book and Movie Festival	Masterful Literary Adaptation	Pavel Lungin	Nominated	
2019	Tallinn Black Nights Film Festival	Best Asian Film (NETPAC Award)	Evgeny Ruman	Nominated	
Religion Today Film Festival	Best Film	Esau	Won		
