= East Side (TV series) =

- Genre: Drama
- Created by: Yael Rubinstein-Nitzan; Yossi Madmoni; Dikla Barkai
- Written by: Yael Rubinstein-Nitzan; Yossi Madmoni
- Directed by: Evgeny Ruman
- Starring: Yehuda Levi; Gefen Kaminer; Shlomi Koriat; Neta Riskin; Sarah Vino-Elad
- Composer: Avi Belleli
- Country of origin: Israel
- Original languages: Hebrew; Arabic; Greek

Production
- Cinematography: Toby Hochstein

Original release
- Network: Kan 11

East Side (Hebrew: איסט סייד) is an Israeli drama television series that premiered on February 19, 2023, on Kan 11. The first season ended on March 21, 2023, and the series was renewed for a second season.

The series was created by Yael Rubinstein-Nitzan and Yossi Madmoni and directed by Yevgeny Ruman.

Gefen Kaminer, who plays the character of Maya Ben Dahan, a girl with special needs, is the first autistic person in Israel to play a recurring character in a television series.

== Premise ==
The series tells the life story of Momi (Yehuda Levi), a former Shin Bet agent and single father to Maya (Gefen Kaminer), a girl with special needs, who works as a real estate agent closing complicated deals in East Jerusalem.

== Awards and nominations ==
The series was nominated in ten categories in the 2023 Israeli Television Academy Awards, among them best drama series, best main actor (Levi), best main actress (Kaminer), and best music (Avi Belleli).

Deadline Hollywood listed East Side as one of six international dramas to watch in 2023.
