= The Man in the Wall (film) =

The Man in the Wall (Hebrew: האיש שבקיר) is a 2015 Israeli drama film, written and directed by Evgeny Ruman. The film is set entirely in a Tel Aviv apartment following a man's disappearance.

The film was shot over six days in a single apartment in Tel Aviv and depicts events over a 12-hour period, following a woman whose husband suddenly disappears. Throughout the night, various people unexpectedly visit, revealing possible reasons for his disappearance.

At the heart of the film is the song Ha'ish She'Bakir ("The Man in the Wall") by Yehuda Pardes and Meir Hernik, arranged by Noam Inbar and performed by him with the ensemble Greendream.

Tamar Alkan was nominated for the Ophir Award for Best Actress and won the Best Actress award at the Odessa International Film Festival. Evgeny Ruman was nominated for the Ophir Award for Best Original Screenplay, nominated for the Haggiag Award for Best Feature Film at the Jerusalem Film Festival, and won Best Director at the Rotterdam International Film Festival.

== Plot ==
Young wife Shira is awakened one Friday night from a nap by a neighbor, complaining that her dog was alone outside their apartment building. He had been taken for a walk by her husband, Rami, who has disappeared. The police refuse to act until Rami has been missing 24 hours, leaving Shira alone to worry. As more and more visitors arrive to talk with and console Shira, surprising new details emerge about her husband and their relationship.

== Cast ==
- Tamar Alkan as Shir, masseuse and Rami's wife
- Gilad Kahana as Rami, sound engineer and Shir's husband
- Ruth Rasiuk as Adi, Shir's friend and Rami's ex-girlfriend
- Alit Kreiz as Shir's mother
- Tom Antopolsky as Ella, Rami's silly drug dealer
- Shlomi Avraham as Young Policeman
- Amitay Yaish Benuosilio as Policeman
- Roi Miller as Nadav, Adi's boyfriend
- Yoav Donat as Dudi, Rami's friend
- Eli Gorenstein as Doron, Rami's father
- Rodia Kozlovski as Tommy, Shir's boyfriend
- Ze'ev Shimshoni as neighbor
