= Red Cow (film) =

2018 Israeli drama film by Tsivia Barkai Yacov

Red Cow פרה אדומה
- Directed by: Tsivia Barkai Yacov
- Screenplay by: Tsivia Barkai Yacov
- Produced by: Itai Tamir
- Cinematography: Boaz Yehonatan Yaakov
- Music by: Karni Postel
- Release date: February 18, 2018 (Berlin International Film Festival)
- Running time: 91 minutes
- Country: Israel
- Language: Hebrew

Red Cow (Hebrew: פרה אדומה; Pa-ra A-du-ma) is a 2018 Israeli independent drama film, directed and written by Tsivia Barkai Yacov. The film premiered at the 2018 Berlin International Film Festival, and won the Best Israeli Film and Best Debut Film awards at the Jerusalem Film Festival.

== Plot synopsis ==
Benni (Avigail Kovari) is a 17-year-old who lives with her father, Yehoshua (Gal Toren), in Silwan, an illegal settlement in East Jerusalem. When a red heifer is born, Yehoshua sees it as a sign of the coming of the Third Temple. Benni is charged with caring for the heifer. When she falls in love with Yael (Moran Rosenblatt), a National Service teacher, the close relationship between Benni and Yehoshua begins to crack. As tensions rise, Benni is determined to secure a future for Yael and her.

== Cast ==
Name	Character	About
Avigail Kovari	Benni	17-year-old religious girl
Gal Toren	Yehoshua	Benni's father, far-right messianic fundamentalist
Moran Rosenblatt	Yael	National Service teacher

== Production ==
The film is Barkai Yacov's directorial debut. In an interview, Barkai Yacov said that the movie was highly personal: She grew up religious, in Beit El, one of the first West Bank settlements, and had a relationship with another young woman in her teens. "The film’s geography, plot and the emotions of its characters are all close to me," she said.

Red Cow was produced by Itai Tamir and received funding from the New Fund for Film and Television and the Israel Film Fund.

== Reception ==
Israel

Daily newspaper ynet critic Shmulik Duvdevani commended the film for providing a glimpse of an area of Israeli life that is seldom seen in the arts – the religious settlements in the West Bank. He opined, however, that the lesbian story line diminished the film and made it somewhat "expected". Haaretz critic Nirit Enderman gave the film three out of five stars. She wrote that the film is "refreshing" in that it provides representation to two under-represented groups – lesbians and settlers – but also felt that the youth LGBT romance did not fit in well with the rest of the highly-political film.

International

In the Hollywood Reporter, Jordan Mintzer found the political aspects of the film downplayed, and the LGBT storyline integral to the drama: "Procuring fine performances from her three leads, Yacov keeps the drama intimate while hinting at the greater issues raised by men like Yehoshua who believe Israel to be a strictly Jewish state, and who are prepared to live in the heart of Palestinian territory in order to prove their point." Sara Ward, in Screen Daily, praised the actors and the cinematography: "Red Cow... moves between the use of walls, fences and shadows to stress the boundaries surrounding its protagonist, and mirroring her restless fervour in its jittery handheld camerawork. Paired with just the right mood — urgent in tone yet measured in pace — the film vibrates with disarming authenticity as a result."

== Awards ==
Year	Award	Category	Nominee	Result	Notes
2018	Berlin International Film Festival	Generation	Red Cow	Nominated	
2018	Ophir Awards	Best Actor	Gal Toren	Nominated	
2018	Ophir Awards	Best Supporting Actress	Moran Rosenblatt	Nominated	
2018	Ophir Awards	Best Original Soundtrack	Karni Postel	Nominated	
2018	Ophir Awards	Filmography	Boaz Yehonatan Yaakov	Nominated	
2018	Jerusalem Film Festival	Best Israeli Feature	Red Cow	Won	
2018	Jerusalem Film Festival	Directorial Debut	Tsivia Barkai Yacov	Won	
2018	Jerusalem Film Festival	Best Actress	Avigail Kovari	Won	
2018	Tokyo International Film Festival	Panorama	Red Cow	Nominated	
2018	India International Film Festival	World Film	Red Cow	Nominated	

== See also ==
- List of LGBT-related films directed by women
