= My Neighbor Adolf =

- Film poster
- Directed by: Leon Prudovsky
- Written by: Leon Prudovsky; Dmitry Malinsky
- Produced by: Stanislaw Dziedzic; Haim Mecklberg; Klaudia Śmieja-Rostworowska; Estee Yacov-Mecklberg
- Starring: David Hayman; Udo Kier; Olivia Silhavy; Kineret Peled
- Cinematography: Radek Ladczuk
- Edited by: Hervé Schneid
- Production companies: 2-Team Productions; Film Produkcja
- Release dates: 4 August 2022 (Locarno); 26 January 2023 (Israel); 9 June 2023 (Poland)
- Running time: 96 minutes
- Countries: Israel; Poland; Colombia
- Languages: English; German; Polish; Yiddish; Spanish
- Box office: $34,196

My Neighbor Adolf (Hebrew: השכן שלי אדולף) is a 2022 comedy-drama film directed by Leon Prudovsky. Set in Colombia in the early 1960s, the film follows a lonely and grumpy Holocaust survivor, Mr. Polsky (David Hayman), who is convinced that his German neighbor, Mr. Herzog (Udo Kier), is Adolf Hitler.

An international co-production of Israel, Poland and Colombia, the film premiered at the 75th Locarno Film Festival before being released in Israel on 26 January 2023.

== Plot ==
In May 1960, Mr. Polsky, an elderly and grumpy Polish Jew and Holocaust survivor, lives alone in the remote countryside of Argentina, spending his time gardening and playing chess. One day, shortly after the abduction of the Nazi criminal Adolf Eichmann by Mossad agents in Argentina, a mysterious old German man, Herzog, moves in next door. Polsky starts suspecting that the man is none other than Adolf Hitler himself, believing that Hitler faked his own suicide, changed his appearance, and fled to South America. Despite nobody believing him, Polsky is determined to prove his view, so he decides to get closer to Herzog in order to gather evidence. As time passes, Polsky discovers Herzog was not Hitler, but was one of his several body doubles who is trying to escape his past. They both reconcile their troubled pasts and become closer. Mossad agents who at first did not believe Polsky, show up and want to investigate. Polsky said he was now mistaken about Herzog, but the agents still want to interrogate Herzog. Polsky tells Herzog what he had done and Herzog thanks him and leaves to a new location to hide.

== Cast ==
- David Hayman as Mr. Marek Polsky
- Udo Kier as Mr. Hermann Herzog
- Olivia Silhavy as Frau Kaltenbrunner
- Kineret Peled as intelligence officer

== Reception ==
On the review aggregator website Rotten Tomatoes, 44% of 25 critics' reviews are positive, with an average rating of 5.6/10. Metacritic, which uses a weighted average, assigned the film a score of 35 out of 100, based on four critics, indicating "generally unfavorable" reviews.

Peter Bradshaw of The Guardian wrote, "Kier, as ever, delivers a spoonful of black-comic menace and Hayman does an honest job. But there's something treacly about it."

Kevin Maher of The Times called the film "A nifty dramatic premise [that's] squandered with camp inconsequence".
