= No-One (2018 film) =

NO-ONE
- Directed by: Lev Prudkin, Vladimir Prudkin
- Written by: Vladimir Prudkin; Lev Prudkin
- Produced by: Vladimir Prudkin
- Starring: Slava Jolobov; Natalia Vdovina; George Marchenko; Elizaveta adi kvetner Boyarskaya; Alexey Agranovich
- Cinematography: Ziv Berkovich; David Stragmeister; Boris Litovchenko
- Music by: Evsey Evseyev
- Production companies: Mirage Adventures; Prudkin & Prudkin Film; Sasha Klein Production; Kinotur-Kiev
- Release date: 23 April 2018 (Moscow International Film Festival)
- Running time: 117 minutes
- Countries: Israel; Ukraine
- Language: Russian

NO-ONE is a 2018 Israeli-Ukrainian film written and directed by Vladimir Prudkin and Lev Prudkin. The film premiered at the 40th Moscow International Film Festival on April 23, 2018. The film won the awards for Best Feature Film and Best Cinematography at the Vienna Independent Film Festival, Best Feature Film at the Winchester Film Festival and other awards at international film festivals. It was presented at the Marché du Film of the 74th Festival de Cannes on July 10, 2021.

== Synopsis ==
Mysterious events happen in Crimea during the collapse of the Soviet Union.

NO-ONE is a family revenge story that turns into a parable of eternal return and historical guilt. It is an unusual anti-version of Shakespeare's Othello, where the Renaissance characters and events are depicted in a parallel reality in Russia during the military coup of 1991. Venice is replaced by Moscow, Cyprus – by Crimea; the Venetian general Othello becomes a general of the Russian secret police and the insidious schemer Iago, Othello's standard-bearer – an elite student, nephew of the Russian general. All this in a strange way corresponds to Shakespeare's oeuvre, but at some point the events and character relations as if instigated by irresistible forces of fate, start to move away from the familiar plot. The main character is a brilliantly educated and artistically gifted general serving a cruel and blood-drenched organization; he harbors no illusions about the world around him, constantly changes masks and roles, always remaining at the top. Nevertheless, karmic forces pull events and people around him into a deadly vortex of infidelities and defeats. Betrayals cling to one another, and the inevitable becomes reality.

== Cast ==
- Slava Jolobov (Vyacheslav Zholobov) - Oleg Sergeyevich, General of the KGB (Soviet Secret Service)
- Natalia Vdovina - Tamara, his wife
- George Marchenko - Vlad, his nephew, a student at a prestigious college
- Elizaveta Boyarskaya - Zina, Vlad's classmate, daughter of a Soviet party boss
- Alexey Agranovich - Assistant to the General, KGB Officer
- Dima (Dmytro) Sova - Sasha, lifeguard on the beach in the Crimea
- Aleksandr Feklistov - KGB Officer, an old friend of the General
- Lev Prudkin - KGB Officer in the Crimea
- Edi Kvetner - Zhora, Vlad's classmate
- Sophia Kashtanova - Miranda, Zina's friend

== Awards ==
- Best Feature Film and Best Cinematography Awards at Vienna Film Festival
- Best Feature Film Award at Winchester International Film Festival
- Best Director of Foreign Language Film Award at West Europe Film Festival in Brussels
- Best Original Screenplay Award at London Fusion International Film Festival
- Best Feature Film Finalist at Near Nazareth Film Festival in Israel
- Best Feature Film Nominee at Burbank International Film Festival in Los Angeles
- Best Drama Feature Award at Hong Kong Indie Film Festival
- Best Feature Film Award at Seoul International Film Festival, Republic of Korea
- Best Feature Film Award at Austin International Art Festival, USA
- Best Feature Film Award at New Wave Film Festival in Munich, Germany
