= Yaniv Biton =

Israeli actor (born 1978)

- יניב ביטון
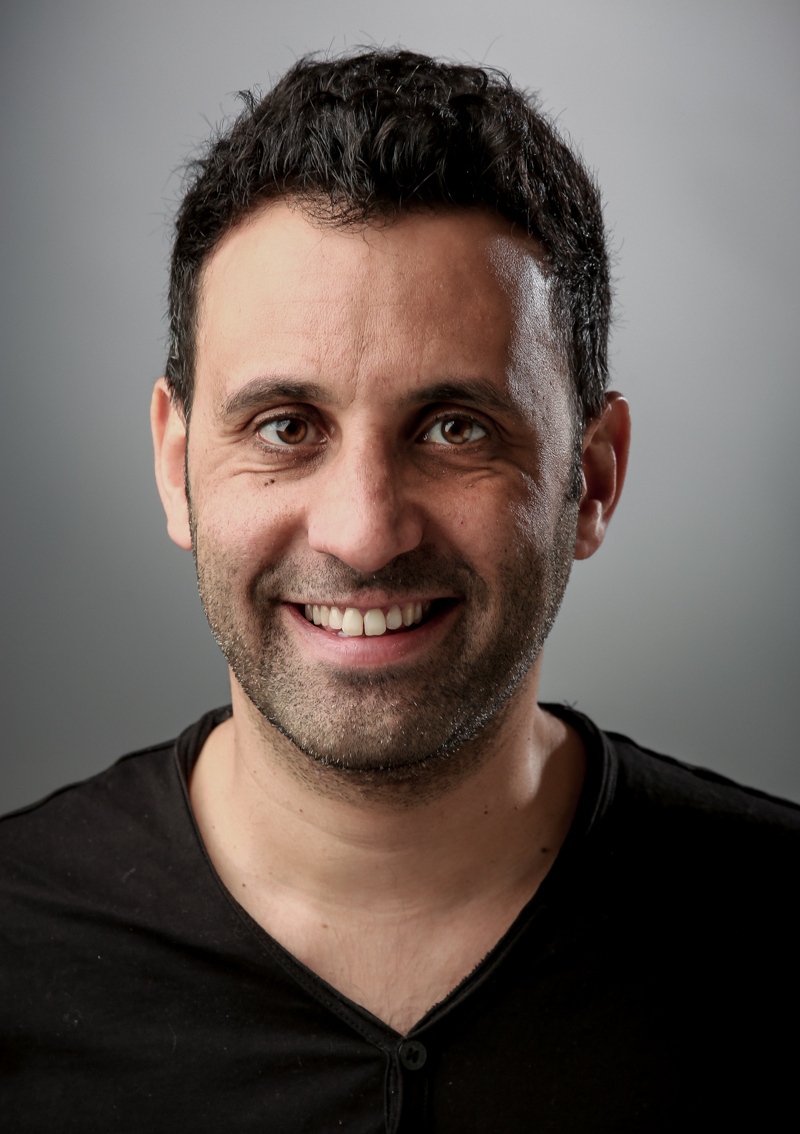
- Born: 1 July 1978 (age 48); Jerusalem, Israel
- Occupations: Actor; comedian
- Years active: 2004–present
- Spouse: Avi Tairi (m. 2016)
- Children: 2

Yaniv Biton (Hebrew: יניב ביטון; born 1 July 1978) is an Israeli television, film and theater actor and comedian, winner of the Israeli Academy Award for Television.

== Biography ==
Biton was born in Jerusalem, and grew up in Ma'ale Adumim.

== Career ==
=== Theater ===
- Library Theater: In 2004 he played the Madman, the lead role in the play Suspected Anarchist by Dario Fo directed by Yoav Michaeli, played Roger in the musical Grease by Jim Jacobs and Warren Casey directed by Gilad Kimchi, and played Puck in Shakespeare's A Midsummer Night's Dream.
- Tzavta Theater: In 2005 he acted in the musical Being Involved, written by Dana Porat and Edina Haimis who also directed.
- National Youth Theater: In 2006 he acted in the play Sesgonia written by Datia Ben Dor and directed by Rafi Niv.
- At the Stage and Business program of the Fringe Center at Beit Tzioni America: In 2006 he played Tom in the play The Gagarin way by Gregori Baark directed by Yossi Pitchhadze.
- In 2007 he joined the comic ensemble The Hebrew Platoon directed by Moriah Zarchia.
- Opening Stages Festival: In 2008 he acted in the play The End of the World of Debbie and Alon written by: Jenny Eixaz-Elazar directed by Sarit Hariri.
- Orna Porat Children's Theater: He acted in the play This Song is Mine Too written and directed by Yaki Machraz.
- Beit Lessin Theater
  - In 2014 he acted in the play The Handicapped by Gur Koren directed by Gilad Kimchi.
  - In 2015 he acted in a revised version of the Shakespearean comedy The Taming of the Shrew, directed by Udi Ben-Moshe.
  - In 2018 he played the servant Truffaldino in the play Servant of Two Masters.

==== Cameri Theater ====
In 2005 he participated in the show Cameri Singing directed by Tzedi Tzarfati, played Rosencrantz and Osric in the play Hamlet by Shakespeare directed by Omri Nitzan. That same year he acted in the play Plonter which was written (in collaboration with the actors) and directed by Yael Ronen. In 2006 he played Camille Chandebise in the play A Fly in the Head by Georges Feydeau directed by Omri Nitzan.

In 2007 he played Jackie in the play It's the Big Sea by Yosef Bar-Yosef directed by Dedi Baron, and played Rosencrantz in the play Rosencrantz and Guildenstern Are Dead by Tom Stoppard directed by Yael Ronen. In 2008 he acted in the play The Good Person of Szechwan by Bertolt Brecht directed by Udi Ben-Moshe. In 2009 he acted in the play Dirty Money by Ray Cooney directed by Leslie Luton, and played Gidi in the play ע 17 by Shai Lehav and Yoni Zichholz directed by Noam Shmuel. In 2010 he played Silvio in the play Servant of Two Masters by Carlo Goldoni directed by Moni Moshonov. In 2011 he played Dromio from Syracuse in the play A Comedy of Errors by Shakespeare directed by Moshe Kaplan. In 2012 he played Popper in the play Popper by Hanoch Levin directed by Moni Moshonov. In 2013 he acted in the play Cyrano de Bergerac by Edmond Rostand directed by Gilad Kimchi.

=== Television and Film ===
In 2007 he participated in the TV series Naor's Friends which was written and directed by Naor Zion.

In 2009 he played Yigal Tamir (a parody on Yigal Amir) in the TV series Polishuk created and directed by Shmuel Hasfari. He acted in The Illusion Quiz, a parody trivia game show on Channel 24 hosted by Dror Rafael. In 2009 he dubbed the characters of Oshri Cohen, Eyal Golan, Haim Revivo, Yehuda Levi, Mody Bar On and Mati Caspi in the animated series Celebs. That same year he played an Israeli soldier in the Palestinian director Elia Suleiman's film The Time That Remains.

In 2011 he began playing various characters on the comedy talk show Comeback on Hot Comedy Central and on the TV show Israeli National Team on Television which aired on Channel 10 where he impersonated various people such as Dudu Erez, Shahar Hason and Margalit Tzan'ani .

In 2012 he portrayed Hajbi in the TV series New York and Elad in the series Allenby. That same year he joined the seventh season of the show Tzhok MeAvoda (Laughing from Work) where he impersonated various people such as Michal Daliot, Dudu Aharon and Moshe Peretz.

In 2013 he portrayed Nitzan in the TV series Irreversible and Cristiano Alves in the series HaKalmarim which aired on Hot. That same year he portrayed Yaakov Bino, Jose in the asylum, in the series Haborer.

Since 2014, he has been acting in the sketch show "The Jews are Coming" where he impersonated various people such as Zohar Argov, and David Levy. In the same year, he played Nachi in the movie "Shoshana Halutz Merkazi".

In 2015-2016 the drama series "HaMidrasha" aired on Channel 2, in which Biton portrayed Kobi Frachdel. Additionally, since 2015 he has been portraying the character of Yigal in the series "La Familia" which aired on Channel 10.

Since 2016, Biton has been one of the presenters of the Travelist vacation website.

In 2017 he hosted a comedic documentary series on social media called "The Science of Stupidity" on Channel 1. That same year he started portraying Albert in the series "The Big Nothing".

In 2018 he appeared in the TV series "Shababnikim" portraying "Rabbi Hajbi" and participated in the feature film "Tel Aviv on Fire". In 2018 he also appeared in the TV series "Doghouse".

On September 26, 2019 the TV series "Fifty" premiered with his participation. In December 2019, he participated in the series Yaldey Bet HaEtz ("Tree House Kids") on Kan Educational, and for his role in the series he won the Best Actor in a Children's Series award from the Academy and was nominated for the Children's Television Awards.

In 2019–2021 he portrayed the prisoner Eliyahu Malachi (apparently based on the figure of Goel Ratzon) in the satirical series "Prisoners of War" which takes place in the fictional "Vineyard Prison".

In 2020 he started acting in the TV series "Kibbutzniks", had a small role in the comedy series “Zot VeZoti” and portrayed an officer in the series “The Eighties”. That same year he started acting in the Eretz Nehederet comedy show, portraying journalist Avishai Ben-Haim, Arieh Deri, Professor Yaron Zelikha, Yuli Edelstein, Ila Hason, Niv Galboa and other characters.

In 2021 he also shot for the TV series “Motek Bool BaEmtza”. Later that year he acted in the drama series “Alumim” alongside Shani Cohen. In November of that year, the third season of the series “Checkout” aired, in which he played Rami Ventura, an employee at the nearby “Ventura Delicatessen”, who has a tumultuous neighborly relationship with Ramsi.

In 2023 he participated in Avi Nesher’s film, Gan Kofim, playing Avsha. In 2026, he played a security guard at the nova music festival in Avi Nesher's film, Our Loves.

== Personal life ==
Biton came out as gay when he was 20 years old. Since 2006 he has been living with his partner Avi Tairi in Tel Aviv. In 2016 the couple married in the United States. The couple had twins through surrogacy.
