= The Return (2003 film) =

2003 Russian coming-of-age drama film by Andrey Zvyagintsev

- Theatrical release poster
- Directed by: Andrey Zvyagintsev
- Written by: Vladimir Moiseyenko; Aleksandr Novototsky
- Produced by: Yelena Kovalyova; Dmitry Lesnevsky
- Starring: Vladimir Garin; Ivan Dobronravov; Konstantin Lavronenko; Natalia Vdovina
- Cinematography: Mikhail Krichman
- Music by: Andrei Dergatchev
- Distributed by: Kino International (US)
- Release date: 25 June 2003
- Running time: 105 minutes
- Country: Russia
- Language: Russian
- Budget: below US$500,000
- Box office: US$4.4 million

The Return (Russian: Возвращение, romanized: Vozvrashcheniye) is a 2003 Russian coming-of-age drama film directed by Andrey Zvyagintsev and released internationally in 2004. It tells the story of two Russian boys whose father suddenly returns home after a 12-year absence. He takes the boys on a holiday to a remote island on a lake that turns into a test of survivability of almost mythic proportions.

The Return received widespread critical acclaim. It won the Golden Lion at the 60th Venice International Film Festival (as well as the award for the best first film) and was nominated for the Golden Globe for Best Foreign Language Film. The film was also selected as the Russian entry for the Best International Feature Film at the 76th Academy Awards, but it didn't make the final shortlist. It has since been regarded as one of the greatest films of the 21st century.

== Plot ==
In contemporary Russia, Ivan and his older brother Andrei have grown a deep attachment to each other to make up for their fatherless childhood. Both their mother and grandmother live with them. After running home after a fight with each other, the boys are shocked to discover their father has returned after a 12-year absence. With their mother's uneasy blessing, Ivan and Andrei set out on what they believe will be a simple fishing vacation with him.

Andrei is delighted to be reunited with their father and Ivan is apprehensive towards the man whom they know only from a faded photograph.

At first, both brothers are pleased with the prospect of an exciting adventure, but they soon strain under the weight of their father's awkward and increasingly brutal efforts to make up for the missing decade. Ivan and Andrei find themselves alternately tested, rescued, scolded, mentored, scrutinized, and ignored by the man. Andrei seems to look up to his father while Ivan remains stubbornly defensive.

As the truck stops and cafés give way to rain-swept, primeval wilderness coastline, Ivan's doubts give way to open defiance. Andrei's powerful need to bond with a father he's never known begins, in turn, to distance him from Ivan. For his part, Ivan resents his father's test of will. Eventually, the tension between them escalates into bitter hostility after the trio arrives at their mysterious island destination.

At first, the three of them are busy settling in. The father wants to show the island to the two boys. Ivan and Andrei are keen to collect worms (as bait) in order to go fishing. Meanwhile, without telling the two boys, their father heads inland to an old, derelict house. Between the collapsed walls of the house, with a shovel, the father starts digging a deep pit. At the bottom of the pit, there is a large trunk. The father opens it. He takes out what looks like a strongbox, which appears to be heavy. Without opening the mysterious box and without checking its content, the father returns to the shoreline with it. Out of sight of the two boys, he places the strongbox inside a compartment under one of the wooden seats, on the small boat that brought them to the deserted island.

The two boys re-appear and are ready to go fishing. Their father lends his wristwatch to Andrei and lets them go away from the shore, in the boat, to enjoy some fishing. But the two boys return much later than had been agreed and their father gets angry. He focuses his anger on Andrei, the elder, as he was notionally in charge of the fishing party. Ivan has an outburst of rage after witnessing his father strike Andrei. He shouts at his father, runs into the forest, and climbs to the top of the observatory tower. Andrei and their father run after him. The father tries to reason with Ivan, but this only stresses Ivan further. He then threatens to jump down from the top of the tower. The father tries to reach out to him, but falls to his death.

Ivan and Andrei take the body across the forest, bring him on board the boat, and row back to where they came. While the boys are putting their gear in the car, the boat starts to drift away. Andrei screams, "Father!" and starts running towards the shore, followed by Ivan, but it is too late. The boat and the body are sinking. Unbeknown to the two boys, inside the boat is the strongbox. Ivan screams "Father!" for the last time from the bottom of his heart. The boat sinks to the bottom of the lake, with the father's corpse and the strongbox in it. The two boys get into the car and drive away. The film ends with photographs from their journey; since the father does not appear on any of them, there is no proof that Andrei and Ivan went on a trip with him.

== Cast ==
- Volodia Garin as Andrei
- Ivan Dobronravov as Ivan (Vanya)
- Konstantin Lavronenko as Father
- Natalia Vdovina as Mother
- Galina Popova as Grandmother
- Aleksey Suknovalov
- Lazar Dubovik

== Production ==
The Return was filmed on and around Lake Ladoga and the Gulf of Finland. The budget of the film remains a secret, though in an interview the director and the producer hinted that it was well below $500,000. The director also mentioned that the producers made their money back even before it was screened at the Venice Film Festival. The film premiered in Russia on 16 October 2003, with the worldwide premiere taking place on 31 October 2003.

Vladimir Garin drowned shortly after filming and two months before the film's debut. He was 16 years old.

== Reception ==
=== Box office ===
The Return grossed $4,429,093 worldwide.

=== Critical response ===
As of 20 September 2020, The Return has an approval rating of 95% on review aggregator website Rotten Tomatoes, based on 88 reviews, and an average rating of 8.2/10. The website's critical consensus states, "A suspenseful but perplexing thriller". Metacritic has assigned the film a weighted average score of 82 out of 100 based on 30 critic reviews, indicating "universal acclaim".

Roger Ebert reviewed, "It is a Kafkaesque story, in which ominous things follow one another with a certain internal logic but make no sense at all."

In a 2016 BBC critics' poll, The Return was ranked the 80th-greatest film of the 21st century. In 2023 The Hollywood Reporter critics' poll, The Return was ranked the 32nd-greatest of the 21st century.

=== Awards and nominations ===
==== International ====
BBC Four World Cinema Awards 2005

- Winner, BBC Four World Cinema Award

European Film Awards

- Winner, European Discovery of the Year (Fassbinder Award)

Golden Globe Awards

- Nominee, Best Foreign Language Film Russia

Palm Springs International Film Festival

- Winner, Best Foreign Film

Venice Film Festival

- Winner, Golden Lion
- Winner, 'CinemAvvenire' Award for Best First Film
- Winner, SIGNIS Award
- Winner, Sergio Trasatti Award
- Winner, Luigi De Laurentiis Award for Best Debut Film

Guldbagge Awards

- Winner, Best Foreign Film

César Awards

- Nominee, Best Foreign Film

==== Russian ====
Russian Guild of Film Critics

- Winner, Best Film
- Winner, Best Director of Photography (Mikhail Krichman)
- Winner, Best Debut

Nika Award

- Winner, Best Film
- Winner, Best Director of Photography (Mikhail Krichman)

Golden Eagle Award

- Winner, Best Film
- Winner, Best Director of Photography (Mikhail Krichman)
- Winner, Best Sound (Andrei Khudyakov)

== See also ==
- List of submissions to the 76th Academy Awards for Best Foreign Language Film
- List of Russian submissions for the Academy Award for Best International Feature Film
