= Natalia Vdovina =

Russian film and stage actress (born 1969)

- Born: Natalia Gennadievna Vdovina; 12 January 1969 (age 57); Belogorsk, Belogorsky District, Crimean Oblast, Ukrainian SSR, USSR
- Citizenship: Soviet Union (until 1991); Russia
- Occupation: Actress
- Years active: 1995-present

Natalia Gennadievna Vdovina (Russian: Наталия Геннадиевна Вдовина, romanized: Nataliya Gennadiyevna Vdovina; born 12 January 1969) is a Russian film and stage actress. She is best known for her performance as mother in The Return. She also won several awards for her performance on stage.

== Biography ==
Natalia Vdovina was born in Belogorsk, Crimea, Soviet Union. In 1990 she graduated from the Mikhail Shchepkin Higher Theatre School and was accepted into the troupe of the theater "Satyricon" named after Arkady Raikin.

Natalia has two children: a daughter, Maya and a son, Roman.

== Awards ==
- Artist of the Russian Federation (2001)
- Laureate of the Moscow Prize in Literature and Art (1999)
- Laureate of Moscow's highest theater prize, the Crystal Turandot (1994)
- twice winner of the Russian theater prize the Seagull Award (2001, 2006)

== Selected filmography ==
=== Film ===
Year	Title	Role	Notes
1995	Dachniki	Varvara Basova	(ru)
2003	The Return	Mother	
2005	Ordering	Anna	(ru)
2006	Z odzysku	Katia	
2009	Double Missing	Viktoriya	
2011	For all life	Nina Volnaya	
2015	Without Borders	Sveta	(ru)
2015	Last Night	Nadya	
2017	How Vitka Chesnok Took Lyokha Shtyr to the Home for Invalids	Vera	(ru)
2018	NO-ONE	Tamara, General's wife	
2018	Your Tutor (Vash Repitor)	Anna Savva's Tutor	

=== Television ===
Year	Title	Role	Notes
2002	Poirot's failure	Mrs. Foliot	(ru)
2003	People and shadows 2. Optical illusion	Leikin	Mini-series
2003	The sky with polka dots	Klavdiya	
2003	Taxi driver	Elena Starkova	
2005	The New Russian Romance	Alevtina	
2005	The charm of evil	Vera Guchkova	(ru)
2006	Your Honor	Marina Andreevna Seregina	
2007	Mymra	Elena Chistyakova / Lenka Tyutina	TV
2007	Beautiful Elena	Natalya	TV
2007	Teacher in law	Lydiya Markina	TV
2009	Court	Marina Seryogina	
2009-10	Kremlin cadets	Svetlana Mamina, doktor	(ru)
2010	The best friend of my husband	Inna Panova	TV
2011	Pirate and piratka	Olga Kapustina	
2011	Porcelain wedding	Nina Uteshina	
2012	Brothers	Lena	
2012	Swallow's Nest	Asya	
2012-13	Do not cry for me, Argentina	Masha Yakovleva	
2013	Mother and Stepmother	Mariya Paramonova	Mini-Series
2013-15	The last of the Magikyan	Anastasiya Pavlovna (Egor's mom)	(ru)
2014	Two winters and three summers	Anfisa Minina	(ru)
2016	Love Network	Arina	
2017	Porcelain House	Alla Grossman	Mini-Series
2020	Passengers	Ella	TV Series
