= Evgeny Ruman =

Israeli film director, editor and writer

- יבגни רומן
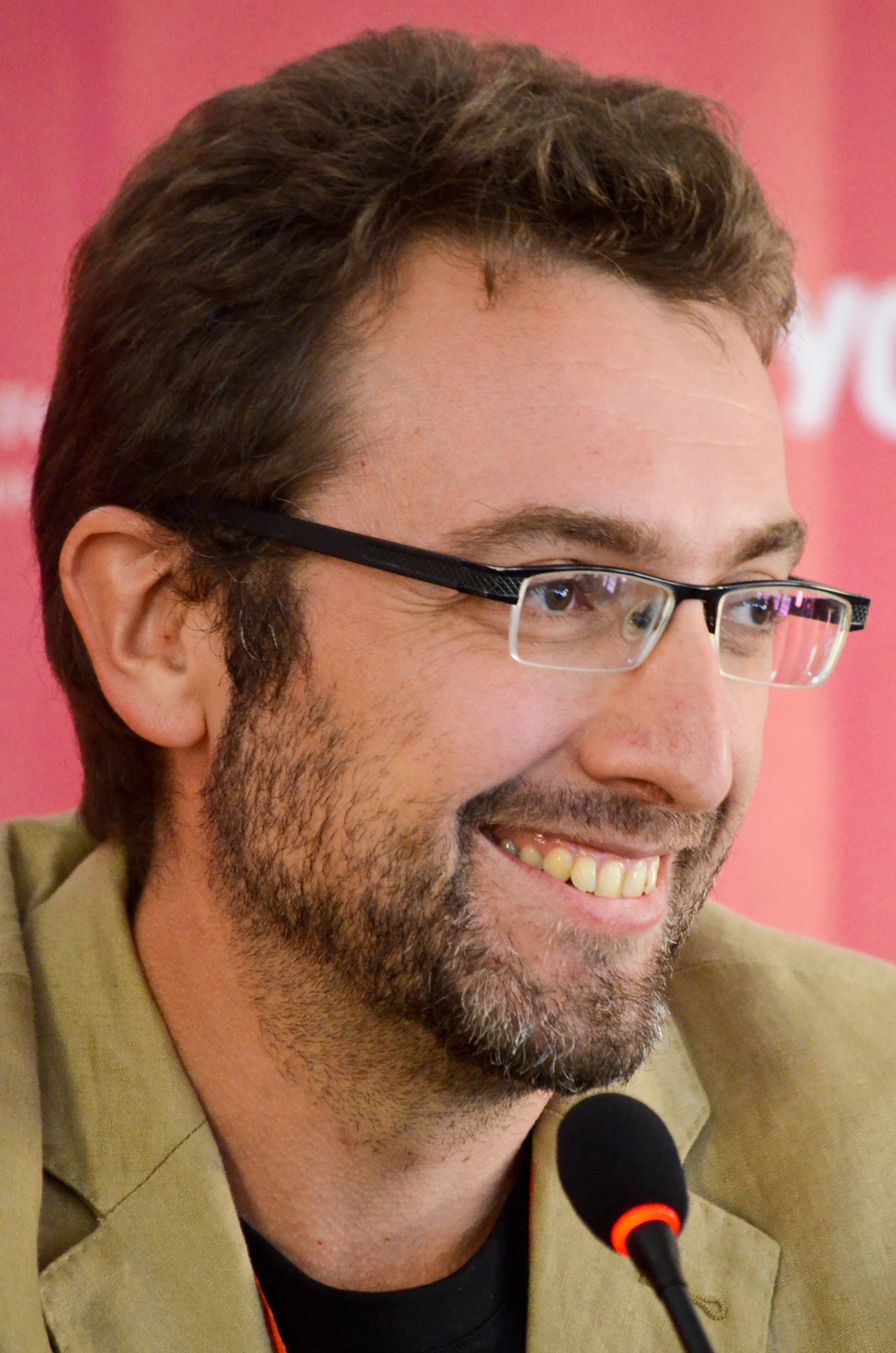
- Ruman at the Odesa International Film Festival in 2015
- Born: January 1, 1979 (age 47); Minsk, Byelorussian SSR, Soviet Union
- Citizenship: Israeli
- Education: Tel Aviv University (Steve Tisch School of Film and Television)
- Occupations: Film director, screenwriter, film editor
- Years active: 2006–present
- Known for: Esau; Golden Voices; Motherland
- Awards: Ministry of Culture Excellence Award (2013); Yuri Stern Prize for Immigrant Artists (2014); Tallinn Black Nights Film Festival Best Script (2019); NETPAC Award for Best Asian Film (2019)

Evgeny Ruman (יבגני רומן; born January 1,1979) is an Israeli film and television director, film editor, and screenwriter. Born in Minsk, Belarus, he immigrated to Israel with his family in 1990 as part of the 1990s post-Soviet aliyah wave. He later graduated from Tel Aviv University’s Steve Tisch School of Film and Television.

Among his films has been Five Hours from Paris (2009; which won Best Film at the Haifa International Film Festival), for which he was an editor. He was both the director and an editor of The Man in the Wall (2015), the director and a co-writer of Golden Voices (2019; which won Best Script at the Tallinn Black Nights Film Festival, the NETPAC Award for Best Film, and the International Panorama Award for Best Director at the Bari International Film Festival), a co-writer of Esau (2019), the director of East Side (2023), and a co-creator, writer, and the director of Motherland (2025) .

He has received the Israeli Ministry of Culture Excellence Award (2013), and the Israeli Ministry of Aliyah and Integration Yuri Stern Prize for Immigrant Artists (2014).

== Early life ==
Ruman was born in 1979 in Minsk, Belarus (then part of the Soviet Union). In 1990, at the age of 10 he immigrated to Israel with his family, amid the collapse of the Soviet Union. His early biographical and immigration experiences later informed his filmmaking, mirroring the narrative for his 2019 feature film Golden Voices.

He studied cinema and graduated from the Steve Tisch School of Film and Television at Tel Aviv University. During his university studies, he wrote and directed award-winning student short films, which participated in international film festival.

== Film and television career ==
=== Early years ===
Following his graduation, Ruman built a portfolio across television development and cinematic editing before expanding into feature-length direction. He served as the creator, head scriptwriter, and director of In Between the Lines (2009), the first Russian-language television drama series produced and broadcast in Israel. Additionally, he edited Leon Prudovsky's romantic comedy Five Hours from Paris (2009), which went on to win the Best Film Award at the Haifa International Film Festival.

Ruman made his feature-length directorial debut with Igor and the Cranes' Journey (2012), a drama centered on childhood migration that premiered internationally at the Toronto International Film Festival and went on to receive awards at film festivals across Chicago, Haifa, and Minsk. He followed this with his second feature film, The Man in the Wall (2015), a psychological thriller filmed entirely inside a single apartment over one night that made its global debut at the International Film Festival Rotterdam.

Later that same year, he directed his third feature film, the English-language musical-fantasy adventure Ruby Strangelove Young Witch (2015), which was also released internationally under the alternative title Ruby the Young Witch. He followed this in 2018 by directing the Israeli found-footage military horror-thriller film Cursed, originally titled Mekulalim. The movie used a remote desert military training exercise to touch upon psychological conflicts and tension among young soldiers. In 2019, he co-wrote the screenplay for the drama film Esau alongside director Pavel Lungin, which adapted a novel by Israeli author Meir Shalev, and starred Harvey Keitel and Shira Haas.

=== Golden Voices (2019) ===
In 2019, Berkovich co-wrote with Ziv Berkovich, who also served as director of photography, the comedy-drama feature film Golden Voices (Hebrew title: Kolot Reka; קולות רקע). The narrative follows an elderly married couple who were celebrated as the preeminent Soviet film voiceover dubbing artists before they immigrated to Israel in 1990 during the collapse of the Soviet Union, only to find that there was no professional demand for Russian-language voice acting in their new home. The film was praised for its tonal balance of bittersweet comedy and narrative depth. Brad Gullickson of Elements of Madness commended the film's artistic execution.

Their screenplay heavily mirrored the real-life background of both Ruman and Berkovich, who had immigrated to Israel as children from the former Soviet Union in 1990 and used their childhood memories of their parents' struggles to ground the film's script. Ruman and Berkovich recorded a feature-length commentary track for the film's home video release detailing how the story mirrored their own immigration experiences.

The international rollout of Golden Voices earned festival accolades, culminating at the 23rd Tallinn Black Nights Film Festival in Estonia, where Ruman and Berkovich won the Best Script award and the Network for the Promotion of Asian Cinema (NETPAC) Best Film prize.

=== 2020s ===
Ruman transitioned into directing high-profile television dramas in the 2020s. In 2023, he directed the 10-episode Kan 11 geopolitical thriller series East Side starring Yehuda Levi, which was acquired for global distribution by Fremantle. In 2024, he directed the medical thriller series Heart of a Killer for the Israeli network HOT, starring Tehran actress Niv Sultan. The series was broadcast internationally. In 2025, Ruman co-created, co-wrote, and directed the historical period crime-drama series Motherland (Hebrew: Migrash HaRusim) alongside Dmitry Malinsky for Kan 11.

== Filmography ==
Year	Title	Role	Notes
2004	Veronica	Director, writer	Short film
2006	Miracle	Director, writer	Short film
2006	A Piece of News	Director, writer	Short film
2009	In Between the Lines	Creator, head scriptwriter & director	TV series; first Russian-language TV drama produced in Israel
2009	Five Hours from Paris	Editor	Feature film
2010	Lenin in October	Director	Television film
2012	Welcome and... Our Condolences	Editor	Short film
2015	The Man in the Wall	Director, writer	Feature film
2015	Ruby Strangelove Young Witch	Director	Feature film
2015	Brother and Sister	Director	Short film
2018	Cursed (Mekulalim)	Director	Feature film
2019	Esau	Co-writer	Feature film
2019	Golden Voices	Director, co-writer	Feature film
2019	R.S.V.P.	Director, writer	Short film
2021	Menagen VeShar	Director	TV series (10 episodes)
2023	East Side	Director	TV series (10 episodes)
2024	Heart of a Killer	Director	TV series
2025	Motherland (Migrash HaRusim)	Co-creator, writer & director	TV series
2026	HaMitmaha	Director	TV series (7 episodes)

== Awards and nominations ==
In recognition of his creative contributions to Israeli film, Ruman received the Excellence Award from the Israeli Culture and Sport Ministry in 2013, and the Israeli Ministry of Aliyah and Integration Yuri Stern Prize for Oleh Artists in 2014.

Year	Association	Category	Nominated work	Result
2009	Haifa International Film Festival	Best Film (as editor)	Five Hours from Paris	Won
2012	Chicago International Children's Film Festival	Children's Jury Award – Live-Action Feature Film	Igor and the Cranes' Journey	Won
2012	Chicago International Children's Film Festival	Adult's Jury Award – Live-Action Feature Film	Igor and the Cranes' Journey	Won
2012	Haifa International Film Festival	Best Israeli Film	Igor and the Cranes' Journey	Won
2013	Israeli Ministry of Culture and Sport	Excellence Award for Contribution to Israeli Film	—	Won
2014	Israeli Ministry of Aliyah and Integration	Yuri Stern Prize for Oleh Artists	—	Won
2015	Ophir Awards	Best Original Screenplay	The Man in the Wall	Nominated
2015	Jerusalem Film Festival	Haggiag Award for Best Feature Film	The Man in the Wall	Nominated
2015	International Film Festival Rotterdam	MovieZone Award	The Man Man in the Wall	Nominated
2019	Tallinn Black Nights Film Festival	Best Script (shared)	Golden Voices	Won
2019	Tallinn Black Nights Film Festival	NETPAC Award for Best Film	Golden Voices	Won
2019	Haifa International Film Festival	Best Israeli Feature Film	Golden Voices	Nominated
2020	Bari International Film Festival	International Panorama Award for Best Director	Golden Voices	Won
