= Five Hours from Paris =

2009 Israeli comedy film

- Promotional poster
- Directed by: Leonid Prudovsky
- Written by: Erez Kav-El; Leonid Prudovsky
- Produced by: Leon Edery; Moshe Edery; Haim Mecklberg; Estee Yacov-Mecklberg
- Starring: Vladimir Friedman; Dror Keren; Dorit Lev-Ari; Helena Yaralova
- Cinematography: Giora Bejach
- Edited by: Evgeny Ruman
- Music by: Gavriel Ben-Podah
- Release date: 12 November 2009
- Running time: 90 minutes
- Country: Israel
- Language: Hebrew

Five Hours from Paris (Hebrew: חמש שעות מפריז, romanized: Khamesh Sha'ot mePariz) is a 2009 Israeli comedy film by Leonid Prudovsky. It premiered as an official selection at the Toronto International Film Festival on 12 September 2009. A French cinema chain caused controversy when they cancelled its release following the 2010 Gaza flotilla raid and instead screened a French documentary about Rachel Corrie, an American protester killed by an Israeli bulldozer in 2004.

== Plot ==
Yigal is a taxi driver with a burning desire to visit Paris, yet his fear of flying stands in the way of him booking a 5-hour flight from Tel Aviv. He then forms a deep emotional bond with a married Russian immigrant, Lina, who plans to immigrate to Canada.

== Cast ==
- Vladimir Friedman as Grisha
- Dror Keren as Yigal
- Dorit Lev-Ari
- Helena Yaralova as Lina

== Utopia boycott ==
Utopia, the French chain of art cinemas caused a wave of controversy when it announced it was removing the Israeli film from scheduling in light of Israel's involvement in the 2010 Gaza flotilla raid. Anne-Marie Faucon, co-founder of the chain said in an interview “It was a protest of our whole company,” (..) “We show many Israeli films, we organize a lot of debates on what happens in the world, but this time we reacted very strongly and in a very emotional way.” Richard Prasquier, president of the Representative Council of French Jewish Institutions countered that it represents a continuing trend of the “delegitimization of Israel” among the French intelligentsia.

French newspapers condemned the banning, with Le Monde stating it represented censorship and that it was a sign of a dangerous trend. The newspaper continued “It is counterproductive. It helps to weaken Israeli voices and eyes who are the most uncompromising about their government. If there is one country in which artists explore with talent and lucidity their state, their society, their leaders and their politics, it is Israel.” Ronit Elkabetz, a veteran actress in French and Israeli cinema also condemned the ban during an interview with the French media.

The ban also led to Israeli-Dutch filmmaker, Ludi Boeken withdrawing his film Saviors in the Night from Utopia's cinemas. Boeken made the move “in solidarity with the censored.”

The French culture minister, Frédéric Mitterrand also condemned the ban, expressing in a letter to Faucon “my incomprehension and my disapproval”.

Utopia's organisers replaced Five Hours from Paris with a documentary Rachel about Rachel Corrie, an American protester killed during a protest in Gaza in 2004. The film was made by Simone Bitton, a Moroccan-born French-Israeli doctor and self-described pacifist who served with the Israel Defense Forces as part of the nation's conscription programme.

The public pressure and Boeke's withdrawal subsequently led Utopia to change their decision. The company revealed "We are certainly ready to include the film in our next screening schedule, as the original message we sought to get across via the cancelation has [been achieved],".
