= Omer Goldman =

Israeli actress (born 1989)

- עומר גולדמן
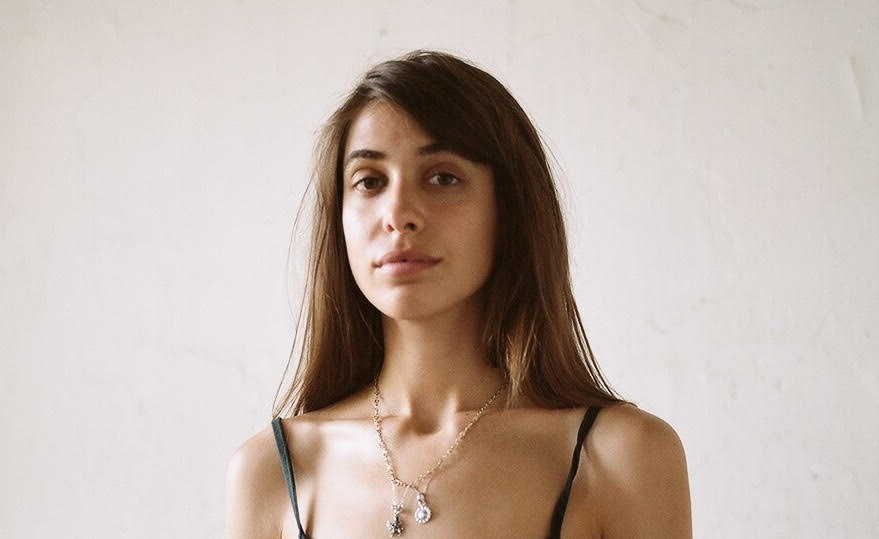
- Born: Omer Goldman Granot; 4 March 1989 (age 37); Ramat HaSharon, Israel
- Citizenship: Israel
- Education: Tel Aviv University
- Occupations: Actress; Film Director
- Spouse: Eyal Elisha (m. 2019)
- Father: Naftali Granot

Omer Goldman Granot (IPA: [ˈʔomeʁ ˈɡoldman ɡʁaˈnot]; Hebrew pronunciation: [omər ɡoldˈmən ɡraˈnot] Hebrew: עֹמֶר גּוֹלְדְמַן גְּרָנוֹת; born 4 March 1989) is an Israeli actress who is known by casting in Shchuna and Esau.

== Biography ==
Omer Goldman Granot is the daughter of Naftali Granot, a former deputy of Meir Dagan, the head of the Mossad. On 22 September 2008, she was sentenced to 21 days in military prison for refusing to serve the Israel Defense Forces (IDF) along with Tamar Katz and Mia Tamarin. She was a member of the Shministim, a group of 40 high-school seniors who declared themselves conscientious objectors.

She was sent to prison again after refusing to serve a second time. She says her political awakening occurred after participating in a demonstration in the Palestinian village of Shufa where the IDF had set up a roadblock and fired rubber bullets at the demonstrators.

From 2014 to 2018, she was the female lead in the Israeli TV series Shchuna, and in 2018, she appeared as a regular in the first season of False Flag. Aside from working as an actress Goldman also started to work as a director since 2020. For the TV series Palmach she did not only act in 4 episodes but also directed 11 episodes herself.

== Filmography ==
=== Acting ===
- 2013: Bitter Lemon (short)
- 2014-2018: Shchuna (Neighborhood) (TV series, 101 episodes)
- 2017: Hachaverim Shel Naor (TV series, 1 episode)
- 2017: Shilton Hatzlalim (TV series, 1 episode)
- 2018: False Flag (Kfulim) (TV series, 6 episodes)
- 2019: Esau
- 2021: Palmach (TV series, 4 episodes)

=== Directing ===
- 2020-2021: Palmach (TV series, 11 episodes)
- 2021-2023: On Our Own (TV series, 57 episodes)
- 2022-2023: Sky (TV series, 30 episodes)
