= Avigail Kovari =

Israeli musician and actress

Avigayil Koevary אביגיל קובארי
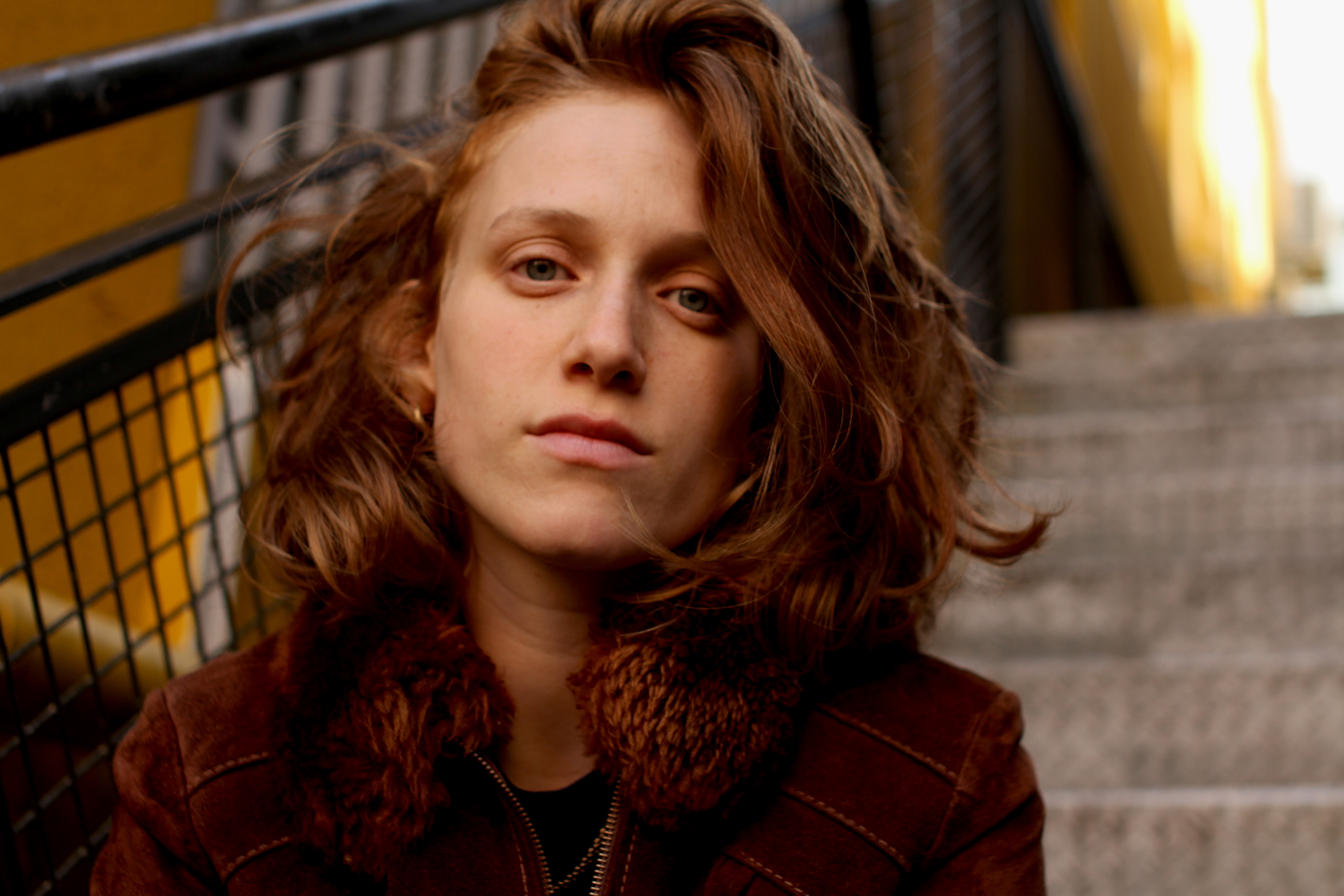
- Born: 14 July 1987 (age 38); Jerusalem, Israel
- Occupations: Singer, musician, film and television actress

Avigayil Atara Koevary (Hebrew: אביגיל עטרה קובארי; born on July 14, 1987) is an Israeli singer, musician, and television and film actress. She won the Best Actress award at the Jerusalem Film Festival in 2018 for her role in the film Red Cow.

== Biography ==
Koevary was born in Jerusalem to a religious family. Her parents were born in the United States, and are second generation to Holocaust survivors. She is the youngest of four children, three of whom left their religious life, including Koevary. Her mother, Hannah Levinsky, was a major influence on her. According to Koevary, "my mother is a feminist within the religious community. Being a religious feminist means continually protesting against your own system."

After completing her compulsory military service, Koevary moved to Tel Aviv to pursue a career as a musician. She began the process of leaving religion behind in 2013.

Koevary completed her BA in art and education at the Kibbutzim College of Education, Technology and the Arts, and is an ayurvedic therapist.

== Career ==
=== Music ===
In high school, Koevary sang in a band started by some friends, and performed around Jerusalem. After moving to Tel Aviv, she began studying music at the Rimon School of Jazz and Contemporary Music, but dropped out after a year and a half, at age 23. She said of the experience, "the most important thing I learned there was how I don't wan't to sound and how I don't want to look on stage." She later completed a songwriting workshop with Dan Toren and Meir Goldberg.

While still at Rimon, she met fellow musician Ziv Zac, with whom she established the indie rock band Koevary. The other bandmates are Maor Alush (bass and backup vocals) and Itai Kfir (drums). Zac produces, arranges and plays electric guitar, while Koevary sings lead and writes.

The band's debut album, Dat Bayit Elohim Ahava (religion, home, god, love) was released in 2014. Their second album, Pil Shamen (fat elephant), came out in 2016. It was written while Koevary trekked across Europe, after a breakup.

In 2018, Koevary released a third album, Bat Zekunim (youngest daughter), which was produced with the assistance of an ACUM grant. The album was well received by critics and the media. Several music videos were produced for album singles, including "Pasim Tsehubim" (yellow stripes) and "Ayalot" (gazelles).

=== Film and television ===
In 2016, Koevary appeared on television for the first time, in the drama series Uri and Ella. She played Zohar, Ella's best friend, who moves in with her and Uri. In one episode, her character sings a duet with Uri.

In 2017, she produced a short student film, "Simona and Eden".

In 2018, Koevary starred in the feature film Red Cow, with Gal Toren and Moran Rosenblatt. She played Beni, a religious 17 year old who lives with her father (Toren) in an illegal settlement, and falls in love with Yael (Rosenblatt). Koevary won the best actress award at the Jerusalem Film Festival. In 2018, she was also in the film Geula, the story of an orthodox widower, whose daughter, Geula, has cancer. Koevary plays the neighbor's daughter, who assists with Geula's care.

In 2019, she starred alongside Aviv Alush in the Haredi drama series, Matir Agunot (Unchained). She received a nomination from the Israeli Television Academy for Best Actress in a Drama Series.
