= Gaja Grzegorzewska =

Polish novelist (born 1980)

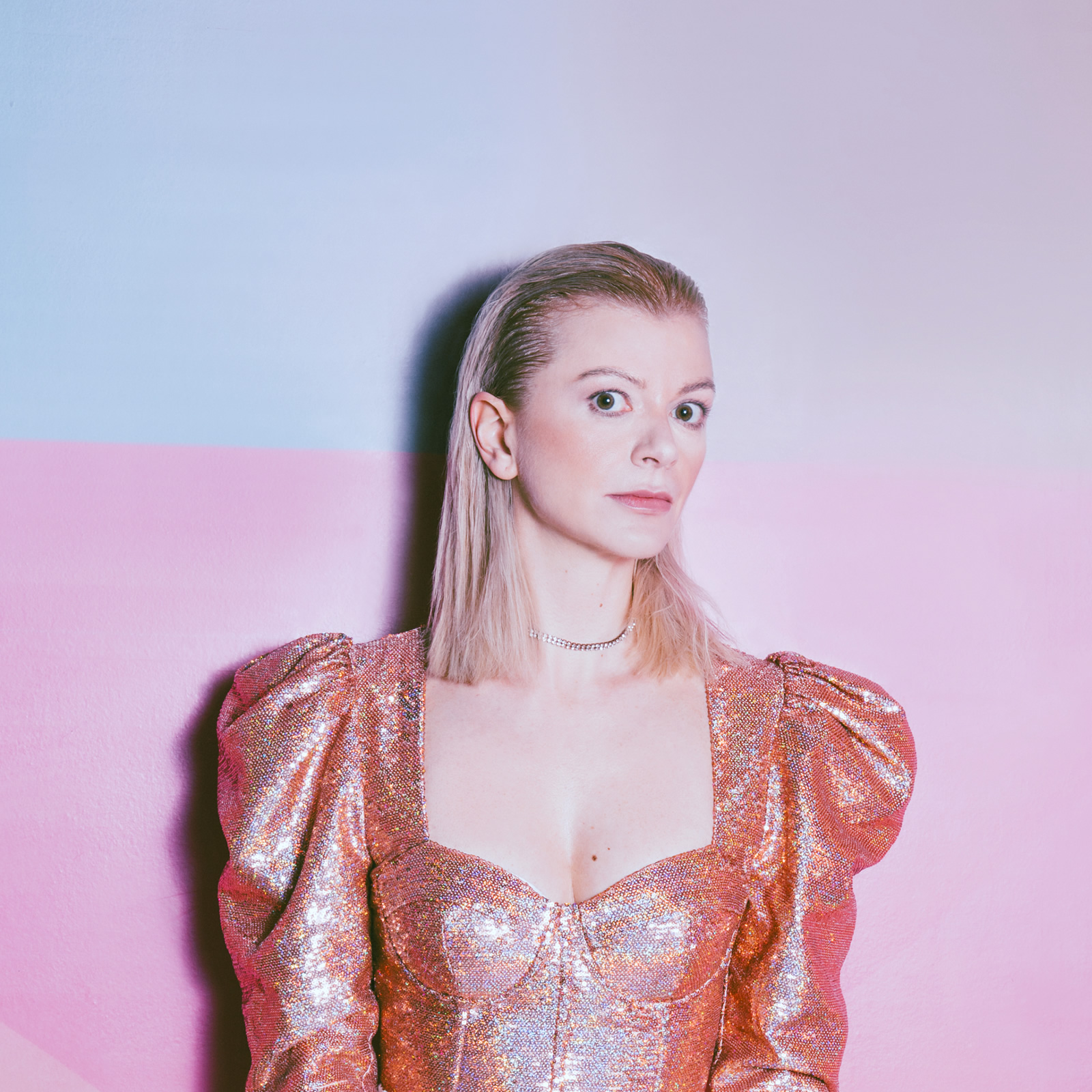
- Gaja Grzegorzewska in 2022
- Born: 11 May 1980 (age 46); Kraków, Poland
- Occupation: Novelist
- Writing career
- Period: 2006–present
- Genre: Crime fiction
- Notable work: Topielica
- Website: gajagrzegorzewska.pl

Gaja Grzegorzewska (born 11 May 1980) is a Polish novelist. She is the author of crime novels about a female private detective, Julia Dobrowolska. She has published novels including Topielica (2010) and Noc z czwartku na niedzielę (2016). She won a Wielki Kaliber Award (Great Caliber) in 2011. She co-authored the script for Cracow Monsters which was released on Netflix in 2022.

== Publications ==
- Żniwiarz. Wydawnictwo EMG. 2007. ISBN 978-83-08-05855-8.
- Topielica. Wydawnictwo EMG. 2010. ISBN 978-8392558385.
- Grób. Wydawnictwo EMG. 2012. ISBN 978-8393101887.
- Betonowy palac. Wydawnictwo Literackie. 2014. ISBN 978-8308053751.
- Noc z czwartku na niedziele. Literackie. 2016. ISBN 978-8308061763.
- Kamienna noc. Wydawnictwo Literackie. 2016. ISBN 978-8308061121.
- Balladyna. Filia. 2019. ISBN 978-8380756939.
- Selkis. Literackie. 2022. ISBN 978-8308075098.

She published several articles for Wprost.

== Award ==
- 2010 Nominated for the Literary Award of Warmia and Mazury for Wawrzyn
- 2011 Won Wielki Kaliber Award (Great Caliber) for the best crime novel of the year 2011 for Topielica

== Personal life and education ==
Grzegorzewska attended school in Cracow and read cinematic studies at Jagiellonian University.
