= Matir Agunot =

Israeli television drama series

- מתיר עגונות
- Genre: Drama
- Created by: Tamar Kay; Yossi Madmoni; David Ofek
- Directed by: David Ofek; Tamar Kay
- Starring: Aviv Alush; Avigail Kovari
- Country of origin: Israel
- Original language: Hebrew
- No. of seasons: 1
- No. of episodes: 12

Production
- Executive producer: Alex Osmolovsky
- Producers: Efrat Shmaya Dror; Anat Koffler
- Cinematography: Shai Goldman
- Editors: Or Sinai; Ari Lahav-Leibovich; Michal Shealtiel Armon
- Running time: 45 minutes
- Production company: Israeli Public Broadcasting Corporation

Original release
- Network: Kan 11
- Release: 2019

Matir Agunot (Hebrew: מתיר עגונות, lit. Unchain the anchored (Note: Agunah (plural Agunot), which translates as "anchored", is the word for a Jewish woman who, for various reasons, is stuck (anchored) in a marriage and cannot re-marry)) is a 2019 Israeli drama television series on the lives of Jewish women who face complex divorce proceedings, where men may refuse to divorce, leading to women being "chained" to their unwanted marriage. The series was created by Yossi Madmoni, Tamar Kay and David Ofek. Aviv Alush and Avigail Kovari star as the main characters, Rabbi Yosef Morad and his wife, Hana. It was critically acclaimed, earning eight nominations from the Israeli Television Academy. The series ran for one season over twelve episodes and premiered on Kan 11 in Israel.

== Cast and characters ==
- Aviv Alush as Rabbi Yosef Morad
- Avigail Kovari as Hana Morad
- Natan Datner as Rabbi Aharon Shapira
- Alma Dishi as Liat Ben-David
- Tiki Dayan as Rachel
- Nadav Gedalia as Moshe Chaim
- Ruti Bornstein as Yafa Shapira
- Guy Arieli as Amit
- Amikam Levi as Shimon
- David Lavi as Shmuel Yitzhak

== Plot summary ==
The series protagonist is Rabbi Yosef Morad (Aviv Alush) who acts as a detective to investigate "chained marriages". Morad's task is to convince the husbands who have separated or even abandoned their wives not to leave them in limbo in their marital state but rather to divorce them. Elush's character is based on the real-life story of Rabbi Eliyahu Maimon. Morad is married to Hannah (Avigail Kovari) and soon discovers she is hiding secrets from him.

== Release ==
The series premiered in Israel in 2019 on Kan 11. In Australia, the series was broadcast by the Special Broadcasting Service in 2021. In 2022, the series became available in many international markets through the Jewish streaming service, ChaiFlicks.

== Reception ==
John Nathan of The Jewish Chronicle described it as an "absorbing", adding: "The thrill of Unchained is not the conflict between spouses or the fiery confrontations between Morad and men who abuse their power, but unexpectedly from the slow-burn depiction of Morad and Hana's marriage; the mystery of their secret lives and their own bid for freedom." Lior Zaltzman of Kveller described it as an "incredible show", continuing: "The issue of agunot goes well beyond Israel, and this show is an illustration of how harsh the reality for some of these women is. It also delves into a lot of complex Israeli societal dynamics."

The series received eight nominations from the Israeli Television Academy: Best Drama Series, Best Actress in a Drama Series (Kovari), Best Actor in a Drama Series (Alush), Best Casting (Emmanuelle Mayer), Best Original Music (Asaf Talmudi), Best Script in a Drama Series (Tamar Kay & Yossi Madmoni), Best Directing in a Drama Series (David Ofek & Tamar Kay) and Best Editor (Or Sinai, Ari Lahav-Leibovich & Michal Shealtiel Armon).

== See also ==
- Israeli television
- Culture of Israel
