= Motherland (Israeli TV series) =

- Genre: Historical drama
- Created by: Evgeny Ruman, Dmitry Malinsky
- Directed by: Evgeny Ruman, Dmitry Malinsky
- Country of origin: Israel
- Original languages: Hebrew, Russian

Production
- Producer: Endemol Shine Israel

Original release
- Network: Kan 11
- Release: 24 February 2025 – present

Motherland (Hebrew: מגרש הרוסים, lit. Russian Compound) is an Israeli historical drama television series created and directed by Evgeny Ruman and Dmitry Malinsky, produced by Endemol Shine Israel.

The series premiered on 24 February 2025, on Kan 11. The main roles are played by Yaakov Zada Daniel, Anatoly Bely and Lena Freifeld.

== Plot ==
The series is set in the 1990s against the backdrop of the "Great Aliyah" — a wave of immigration from the former Soviet Union to Israel. The story follows Yehuda (Yaakov Zada Daniel), a detective at the Jerusalem District Police's Russian Compound precinct, who is investigating the murder of a young immigrant woman from the USSR. The case bears striking similarities to a series of murders that occurred in the Soviet Union during the late 1980s.

The investigation reveals that in the late 1980s, twelve women were murdered in the USSR under similar circumstances. The information comes from Andrei, the father of a man wrongly convicted for the crimes and now awaiting execution in Russia. Desperate to save his son, Andrei travels to Israel in search of the real killer.

== Cast ==
- Yaakov Zada Daniel as Yehuda Gerassi, a detective and divorced father of Tali, a girl suffering from cancer.
- Anatoly Bely as Andrei Chadov, a man whose son was convicted of murder and awaits the death penalty in Russia.
- Lena Freifeld as Masha Kogan, a theater instructor.
- Alon Neuman as Amos, head of the police precinct.
- Ofri Prishkolnik as Tamar Cohen, accident investigator, Yehuda's ex-wife and his colleague at the station.
- Oren Pesso
- Philipp Shaulov
- Anna Dubrovitskaya
- Adi Peled as Tali, daughter of Yehuda and Tamar.
- Nir Saadon as Shimoni, a police officer at Lev HaBira station.
- Nicole Podvalnaya
