= Self Made (film) =

- בורג
- Directed by: Shira Geffen
- Written by: Shira Geffen
- Produced by: David Mandil; Moshe Edery; Leon Edery
- Starring: Sarah Adler; Samira Saraya; Doraid Liddawi
- Cinematography: Ziv Berkovich
- Release date: 16 May 2014
- Country: Israel
- Languages: Hebrew, Arabic, French with English subtitles

Self Made (Hebrew: בורג) is a 2014 Israeli film written and directed by Shira Geffen.

The film follows an Israeli artist (Michal) and a Palestinian DIY store clerk (Nadine) who swap their lives because of a mix-up at a border security checkpoint.

In his review for The Hollywood Reporter, critic Clarence Tsui described the film as being filled with "dark humor" and noted its use of "surreal elements to explore difficult real-world issues." Tsui further explained, "Gefen’s intention is to show that a person's outward appearance is merely a façade," and concluded that the film presents "a thought-provoking and witty commentary on the limitations imposed on women—or perhaps on everyone, in general."

== Synopsis ==
The film tells the story of two women, Michal and Nadine. Michal is a successful visual artist living in Jerusalem. She orders a new double bed from a furniture company called "Ithaca" (a parody of "IKEA"), but when it is delivered to her home, she discovers that one of the necessary screws is missing. One morning, she falls out of her bed and loses her memory.

Nadine, a Palestinian woman living in a refugee camp with her older brother, faces a challenging life: her mother has died, her father is imprisoned in Israel, and she is unmarried, much to the disapproval of her community. She longs for a child and spends most of her time commuting through checkpoints to work at a factory, where her job is to place screws in bags. Nadine loses her job after Michal complains about the missing screw.

Everything changes when a soldier at a checkpoint mistakes one woman for the other, sending each to the other's home. In a series of surreal scenes, they begin to swap identities and lives from opposite sides of the checkpoint.

== Cast ==
- Zidane Awad as Ebrahem
- Sarah Adler as Michal
- Samira Saraya as Nadine
- Omer Perelman Striks as Ido
- Doraid Liddawi
- Na'ama Shoham
- Ziyad Bakri

== Critical reception ==
The film was presented at the Cannes Film Festival and at the Jerusalem Film Festival. It was also shown at the opening night of the AICE Israeli Film Festival in Melbourne, Australia.

In a review for The Hollywood Reporter, critic Clarence Tsui said the film "visual and textual references to the intifada – checkpoints, suicide bombers and views of 'stunning' Jerusalem – it’s a film that talks about another aspect of difficulties in surviving life in modern-day Israel."

Film critic Oron Shamir called the film "a masterpiece by a talented director who attempts to bring a different and dreamlike worldview to the screen in a way that constantly deceives the viewer, resembling a work of art."
