= The Women's Balcony =

- Directed by: Emil Ben-Shimon
- Written by: Shlomit Nehama
- Starring: Evelin Hagoel; Yigal Naor; Aviv Alush; Orna Banai
- Cinematography: Ziv Berkovich
- Release date: 29 September 2016
- Running time: 96 minutes
- Country: Israel
- Language: Hebrew

The Women's Balcony (Hebrew: ישמח חתני) is a 2016 Israeli comedy film directed by Emil Ben-Shimon. The film stars Evelin Hagoel, Yigal Naor, Orna Banai and Aviv Alush. The film follows a Mizrahi synagogue congregation in Jerusalem's Bukharan Quarter. The congregation is in disarray from building damage to their synagogue. A charismatic and handsome young rabbi (Alush) promises to rebuild the synagogue, but seeks to move the community in a far more conservative direction.

A major critical and commercial success, The Women's Balcony was nominated for six Ophir Awards in Israel.

== Plot ==
An Orthodox congregation in Jerusalem is celebrating a bar mitzvah when a section of the synagogue's balcony, where the women sit, collapses. The rabbi's wife is badly injured and in a coma. The elder rabbi, unable to cope with his wife's condition, cannot function and is cared for by Zion (Yigal Naor). Rebuilding, with all the funding, permits and inspections is too much for the leaderless congregation. Congregants meeting in a schoolroom for morning prayers, are short of a quorum of ten men (a minyan) and stop a man in Hasidic garb passing down the street who agree to join them. He is Rabbi David, a teacher, and he brings some of his students who more than meet the minyan requirement of 10 Jewish men.

Hearing their story, Rabbi David takes charge and gets the synagogue repaired, but does not complete the woman balcony, claiming a lack of funds. Trying to get the congregation to be more strict in their observance, Rabbi David tells the men to get their wives to cover their heads and suggests they buy their wives nice head scarves as a gift. The women mostly refuse. Angered at the lack of a place for them in the synagogue, the women, led by Etti, Zion's wife, raise money sufficient to pay for the reconstruction and deposit it in the synagogue’ bank account, but Rabbi David refuses to allow rebuilding, saying the congregation's Torah scroll, which was destroyed in the collapse, must first be replaced. Meanwhile, Rabbi David's assistant is discretely courting Etti's niece.

The women leave their husbands saying they won't return until the balcony is built and later picket Rabbi David's school. The synagogue's treasurer who must countersign any construction check has been avoiding the rabbi so he can't be pressured into signing. Rabbi David visits the old rabbi and tries to convince him that demanding a new Torah scroll be written before completing the balcony is justified under Jewish law, but the old rabbi is still in shock and can't respond. Unable to find the treasurer, a determined Rabbi David forges a second signature and gives the check to his assistant to cash in order to pay a scribe to write the new scroll. He further tells the assistant that he knows about the girl and forbids the relationship. He also gives the assistant legal notices, demanding they end their protest, to hand out to the picketing women. As Rabbi David watches from his office window, the assistant does so, seeming to ignore the niece, but she soon realizes that instead of a notice, he has handed her the check, thereby allowing the balcony reconstruction to begin. Meanwhile, the old rabbi asks to see his wife in the hospital, finally coming to terms with what has happened. The film ends with the young couple's joyous wedding, with the old rabbi in attendance, and Rabbi David being flagged down by another congregation that is seeking a minyan.

== Cast ==
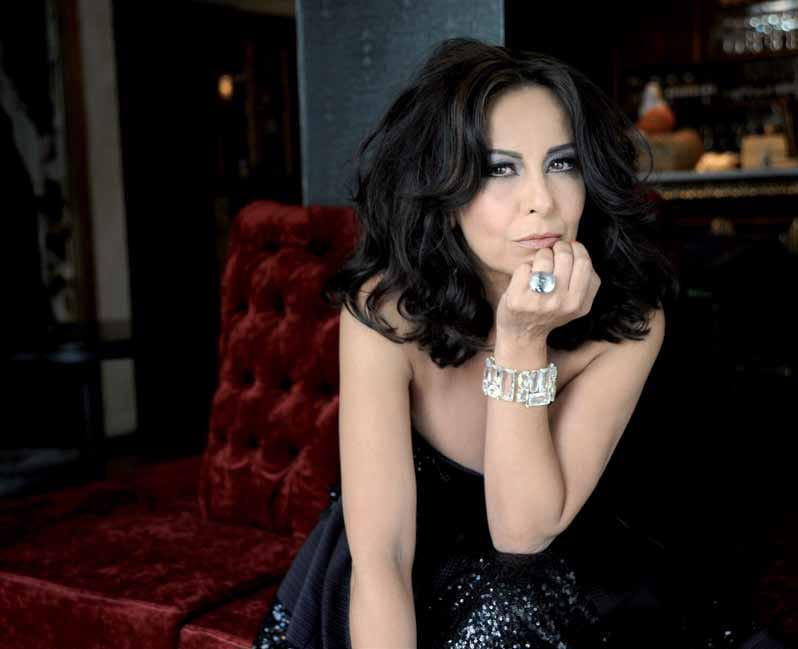
Evelin Hagoel

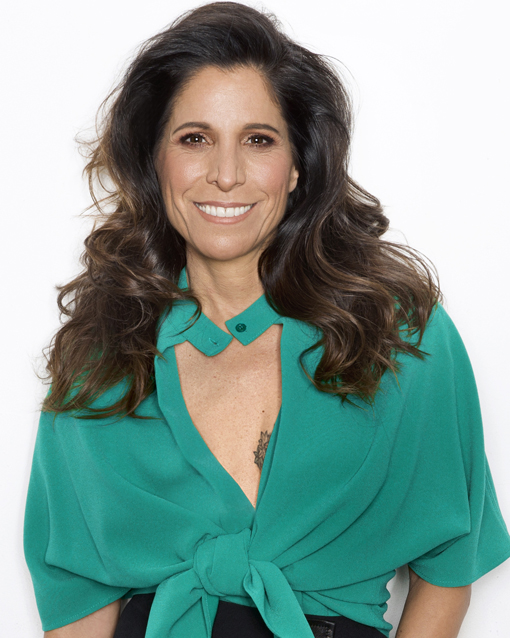
Orna Banai

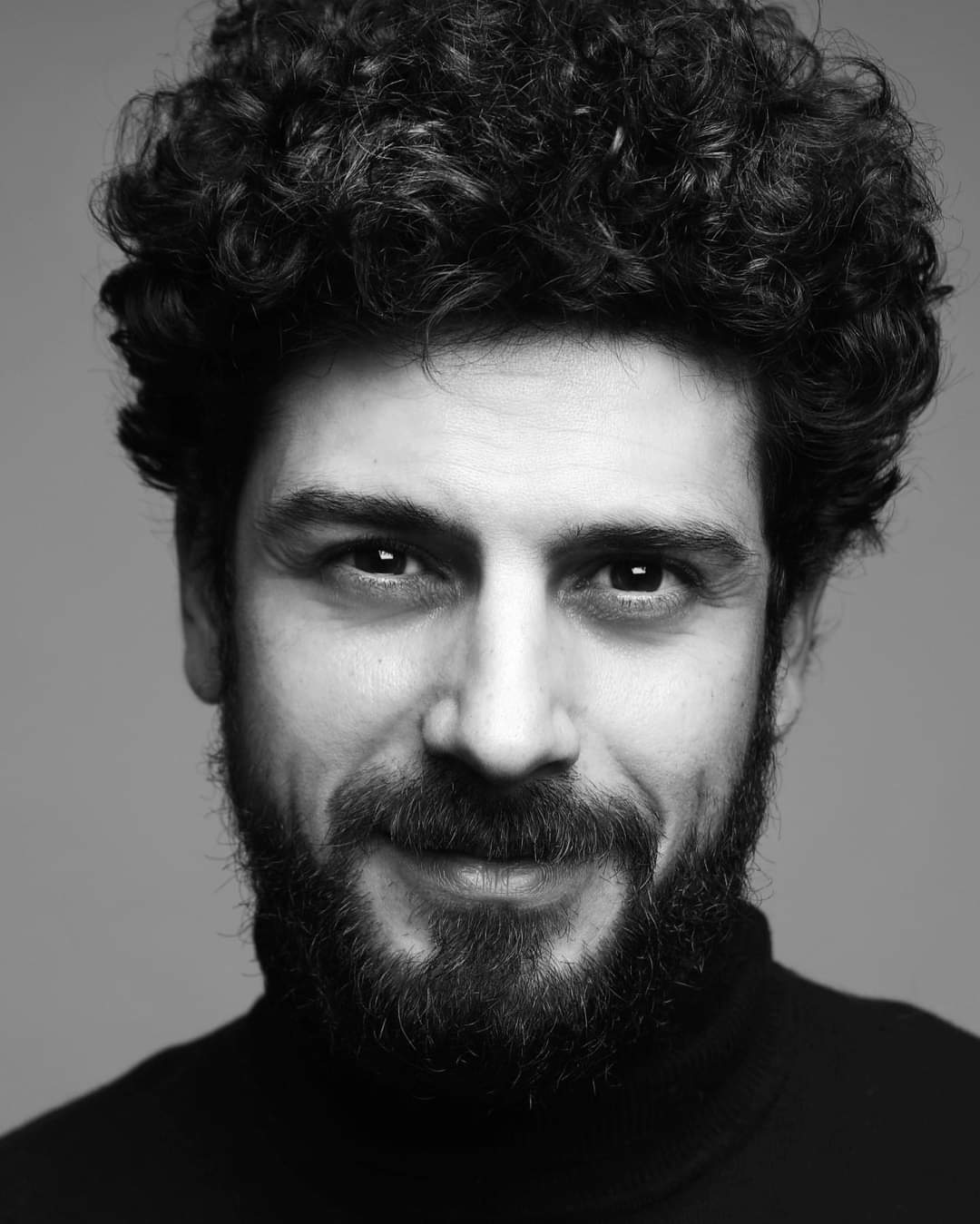
Aviv Alush

Main cast of The Women's Balcony.
- Evelin Hagoel as Etti:

A forthright character that challenges Rabbi David's attempts to move the congregation in a more conservative direction.

- Yigal Naor as Zion
- Orna Banai as Tikva
- Aviv Alush as Rabbi David:

A charismatic and handsome young rabbi that teaches at a Haredi seminary, he promises to rebuild the synagogue, but wants to move it in a more conservative direction.

- Einat Saruf as Margalit
- Sharon Elimelech as Ora
- Itzik Cohen as Aaron
- Herzl Tobey as Nissan
- Haim Znati as Rahamim

== Production ==
Although the film is set in Jerusalem's Bukharan Quarter, it was instead filmed in Musrara, Nahlaot, Yemin Moshe and Talbiya, West Jerusalem neighborhoods that still have Jewish pluralism in terms of observance and practice.

== Release ==
The film received its premiere in September 2016 at the 2016 Toronto International Film Festival. It received a wide theatrical release in Israel and a limited release overseas.

== Reception ==
=== Commercial ===
The film was a major box office success in Israel, topping the charts. It became one of the highest grossing films in the last 20 years in Israel.

=== Critical response ===
The film is critically acclaimed and holds a 96% "fresh" rating on Rotten Tomatoes. Nicole Herrington of The New York Times wrote: "Emil Ben-Shimon’s smart direction (tight shots of narrow streets and even narrower dwellings really convey a sense of an insular community) and Shlomit Nehama’s lighthearted and topical script ensure the proceedings not only hit all the right notes, but also entertain while being respectful of religious traditions." Brad Wheeler of The Globe and Mail wrote: "The Women's Balcony overlooks nothing when it comes to addressing faith, segregation and sexism in a peppery, entertaining way."

=== Accolades ===
At the 2016 Ophir Awards, the film received six nominations: Best Supporting Actress (Banai), Best Supporting Actor (Alush), Best Costume Design (Rona Doron), Best Makeup (Vered Mevorach) and Best Music (Ahuva Ozeri and Shaul Besser).

== TV adaptation ==
In 2021, the film was adapted into a television series of the same name on Keshet 12. Several of the original cast reprised their roles, with Tzachi Halevy also joining the cast.
