= Cracow Monsters =

Polish supernatural thriller television series

- Promotional poster
- Genre: Supernatural; mystery; drama
- Directed by: Kasia Adamik; Olga Chajdas
- Starring: Barbara Liberek; Andrzej Chyra; Małgorzata Bela
- Composer: Mary Komasa Antoni Lazarkiewicz
- Country of origin: Poland
- Original language: Polish
- No. of seasons: 1
- No. of episodes: 8

Production
- Production locations: Kraków, Poland
- Cinematography: Ziv Berkovich
- Running time: 54 minutes
- Production company: Telemark Netflix Polski Instytut Sztuki Filmowej

Original release
- Network: Netflix
- Release: 18 March 2022

Cracow Monsters (Polish: Krakowskie potwory) is a Polish supernatural thriller television series created by Netflix and based on Polish mythology. The show is directed by Kasia Adamik and Olga Chajdas. It was written by Anna Sienska, Gaja Grzegorzewska, and Magdalena Lankosz. The series was released on 18 March 2022 on Netflix.

== Synopsis ==
A young woman in Kraków with a mysterious past joins a team of medical students led by an enigmatic professor who solve supernatural mysteries.

== Production ==
The series title sequence and logo were designed and animated by Piotr Dismas Zdanowicz.

== Cast and characters ==
- Barbara Liberek as Aleksandra "Alex" Walas
- Andrzej Chyra as Professor Jan Zawadzki
- Małgorzata Bela as Aitwar
- Stanisław Linowski as Lucjan "Lucky" Szczesny
- Mateusz Górski as Antoni
- Anna Paliga as Iliana
- Magdalena Koleśnik as Mary
- Kaja Chan as Hania
- Maja Chan as Basia
- Wojciech Brzezinski as Robert
- Daniel Namiotko as Gigi
- Stanislaw Cywka as Birdy
- Eryk Pratsko as Boy
- Malgorzata Gorol as Jagna Walas
- Julia Wyszynska as Ewa Zawadzka

== Episodes ==
Series	Episodes	Originally released	Platform
1	8	18 March 2022	Netflix

== Reception ==
The Scotsman placed the series at number four on a list of top-ten TV shows and movies released in the third week of March 2022. GQ Mexico and Latin America described the show as a "perfect series" for people who enjoy watching horror TV shows.
