= Aviv Alush =

Israeli actor, musician and television host (born 1982)

- אביב אלוש
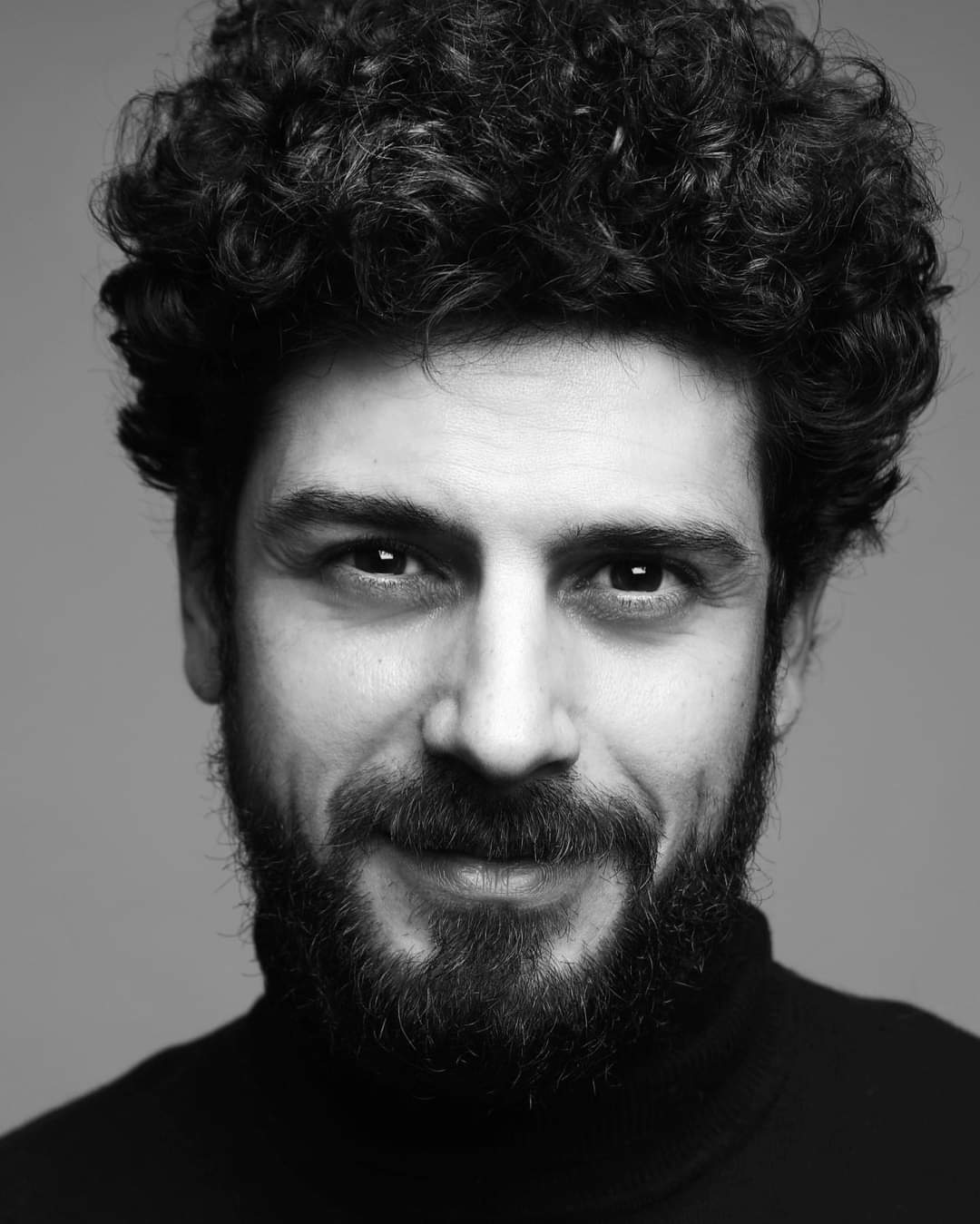
- Born: 12 June 1982 (age 44); Kiryat Bialik, Israel
- Occupations: Actor, musician, model, television host
- Years active: 2004–present
- Spouse: Nofar Koren (m. 2011)
- Children: 5
- Relatives: Reut Alush (sister)

Avraham Aviv Alush (Hebrew: אברהם אביב אלוש; born 12 June 1982) is an Israeli actor, musician, model, and television host. He is best known for playing Amos Dahari, "the Baker", in the Israeli series Beauty and the Baker (Lehiyot Ita), and as Jesus in the American film The Shack (2017). He also played a leading role in the Israeli series Valley of Tears (2020).

== Early life ==
Alush was born in Kiryat Bialik, Israel, to a family of Tunisian Jewish and Yemenite Jewish descent. When he was 10, the family moved to Karmiel, where he grew up with his younger sister Reut Alush, who is also an actress. In high school he studied television and film and joined a youth theatre group.

Alush served as an infantry soldier in the Golani Brigade of the Israel Defense Forces from 2000 to 2003.

== Career ==
Early in his career, Alush was a presenter on the Israeli Nickelodeon channel alongside Dana Frieder.

In 2012, he was cast as Ofir Rider, a series regular in the spy drama The Gordin Cell, starring Ran Danker.

In 2013, he began starring as Amos Dahari in Beauty and the Baker alongside Rotem Sela. The series was positively reviewed by Haaretz. The show was released to international audiences on Amazon Prime Video and on Channel 4 in the United Kingdom.

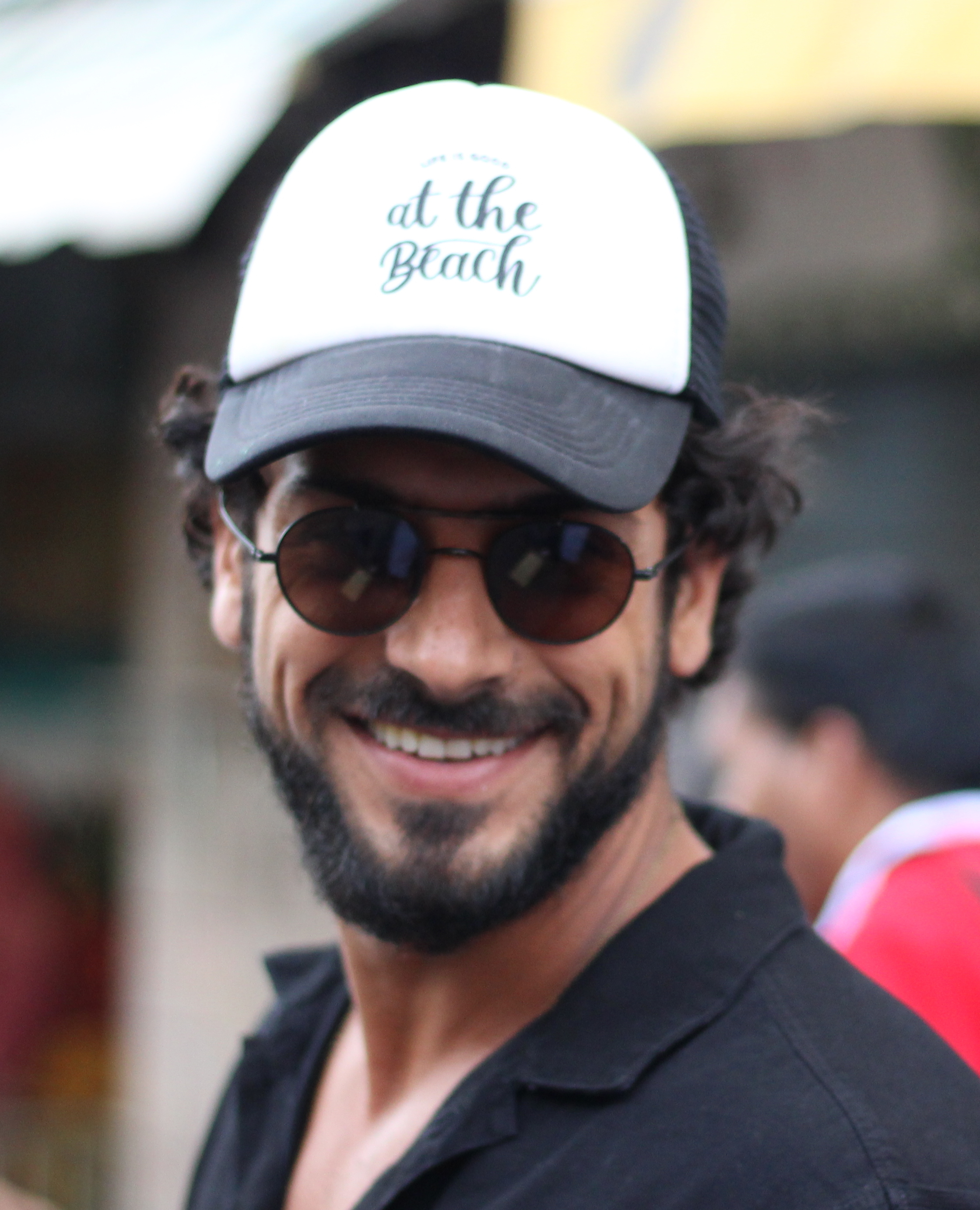
Alush in 2018

In 2016, he had a supporting role as Rabbi David, a charismatic young rabbi, in The Women's Balcony. Alush was nominated for an Ophir Award for Best Supporting Actor.

Prior to his role in the American film The Shack in 2017, he had only played in Israeli films and television. With this role, he became the first Israeli actor to play Jesus in an English-language film.

In 2020, he signed with 3 Arts Entertainment, the talent management agency.

He has also acted on stage, appearing in the Habima Theater production of Dangerous Liaisons in 2016. He previously appeared in the theater's 2012 production of The Merchant of Venice where he played Gratiano.

In July 2026, Alush was cast in a lead role in Holding on to Air, alongside Gal Malka. He plays a pilot in the yes action drama, focused on an international security affair between Israel, the United States and Iran.

=== Additional work ===
He has also modelled, appearing in advertising campaigns for the fashion brand Castro alongside Rotem Sela.

In 2018, he released the single "Hachi Karov Elayich" ("Closest to You") with Ilai Botner. Tablet called it the "hottest Israeli song of the summer", and it placed seventh in Galgalatz's annual chart.

In 2025, Alush released his debut album, Olam Hafukh (Hebrew: עולם הפוך, lit. 'Upside Down World').

== Personal life ==
In 2011, he married Israeli lawyer Nofar Koren, with whom he has five children; their fifth child was born in December 2024. They lived in Tel Aviv. During the COVID-19 pandemic, he moved with his wife and four children to a farm in northern Israel near Mount Meron for several months. In 2021, Alush declared that he had become more religious. He teaches Torah and hosts a faith podcast with Sivan Erez Bitton.

In 2026, Alush revealed that he had helped prepare Gal Gadot for her first acting audition.

== Filmography ==
Year	Title	Role	Notes
2005	Ed Medina	Kiko	TV movie
2005	Pick Up	Gil Antabi	1 episode
2006	Al hacholmim	David Ben-Abu	Short
2008	Ulai Hapa'am		1 episode
2008–2009	Ha-E	Ben	Series regular
2009–2010	The Arbitrator	Idan Haromi	7 episodes
2010–2011	Asfur	Kobi Sharvit	Series regular
2012	Allenby St.	Erez	Series regular
2012–2015	The Gordin Cell	Ofir Rider	Series regular
2013–2021	Beauty and the Baker (Lihiyot Ita)	Amos Dahari	Series regular
2014	The Red Hood Setup	Abutbul	Film
2016	The Women's Balcony	Rabbi David	Film
2017	The Shack	Jesus Christ	Film
2017	An Israeli Love Story	Eli Ben Zvi	Film
2018	State Rules	Dudi	Series regular
2019–2020	Unchained (Matir Agunot)	Rabbi Yosef Morad	Series regular
2020	Valley of Tears (שעת נעילה)	Yoav Mazuz	Series regular
2021	Hit & Run	Omer Alon	Episode #2.1
2026	Reset	Aviv Alush	1 episode
