= Without Borders =

- Film poster
- Russian: Без границ
- Directed by: Karen Oganesyan (ru); Rezo Gigineishvili (ru); Roman Prygunov (ru)
- Written by: Rezo Gigineishvili; Alisa Khmelnitskaya; Davit Turashvili; Irina Pivovarova; Sergey Kaluzhanov
- Produced by: Rezo Gigineishvili; Eduard Iloyan; Denis Zhalinskiy; Irakli Rodonaya; Vitaliy Shlyappo; Archil Gelovani; Igor Mishin
- Starring: Aleksandr Adabashyan; Oleg Basilashvili; Milos Bikovic; Anna Chipovskaya; Inna Churikova
- Cinematography: Pyotr Braterskiy; Evgeniy Ermolenko; Vladislav Opelyants
- Music by: Dato Evgenidze; Nikoloz Rachveli
- Production companies: Nebo; Yellow, Black and White-Group; STS (TV channel)
- Distributed by: Walt Disney Studios Sony Pictures Releasing CIS
- Release date: October 22, 2015
- Running time: 90 minutes
- Country: Russia
- Language: Russian
- Box office: $3,124,744

Without Borders (Russian: Без границ) is a 2015 Russian comedy film directed by Karen Oganesyan, Rezo Gigineishvili and Roman Prygunov. The premiere took place on October 22, 2015.

== Plot ==
The film tells about a group of people who travel to meet love, which has no borders.

== Cast ==
The Airport

- Aleksandr Pal as Sasha Gorelov, lieutenant of the border service
- Milos Bikovic as Igor Gromov, football player
- Mariya Shalayeva as Masha, an employee of the border service
- Ravshana Kurkova as Kamilla, Igor Gromov's wife

Moscow

- Egor Koreshkov as Ivan
- Roman Mayakin as Aleksandr, Ivan's friend
- Sayora Safari as Saya, the blind girl
- Anastasiya Stezhko as Oksana, Saya's friend

Tbilisi

- Inna Churikova as Nina Polyanskaya, widow
- Oleg Basilashvili as Georgiy, a cemetery worker
- Aleksandr Adabashyan as photographer

Yerevan

- Hrant Tokhatyan as Armen
- Natalia Vdovina as Sveta
- Ivan Yankovsky as Artyom, son of Armen and Sveta
- Anna Chipovskaya as Polina, Artyom's girlfriend
- Elena Khodzhaeva as girl
- Luiza Nersisyan as girl at the airport terminal
