= Evelin Hagoel =

Israeli actress

- אוולין הגואל
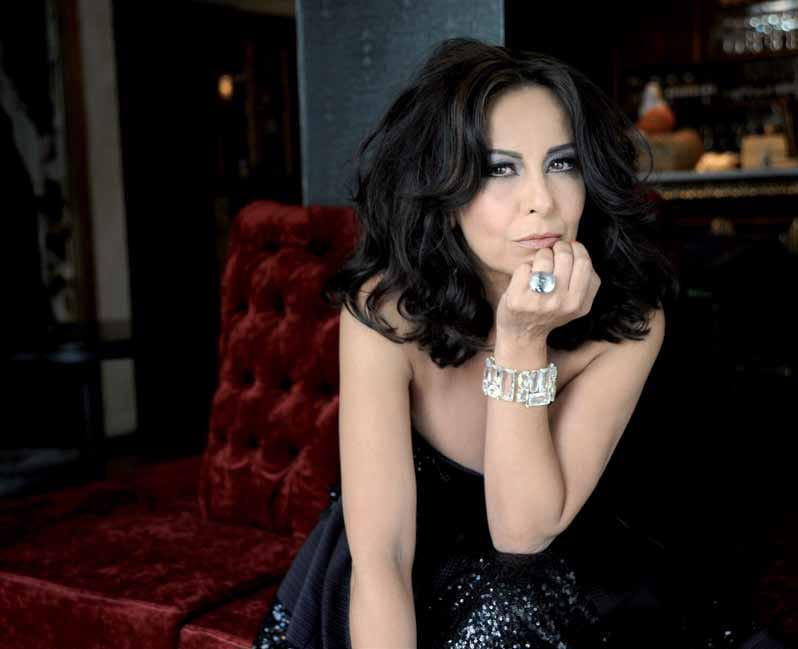
- Born: 27 January 1961 (age 65); Casablanca, Morocco
- Occupation: Actress
- Years active: 2001-present

Evelin Hagoel (Hebrew: אוולין הגואל; born 27 January 1961) is an Israeli actress. She appeared in more than twenty films since 2001.

== Selected filmography ==
Year	Title	Role	Notes
2009	A Matter of Size	Geula	
2016	The Women's Balcony	Etti	
2018	Laces		
