= Olga Avigail Mieleszczuk =

Polish-Israeli singer in Yiddish

Olga Avigail
- Born: Olga Avigail; Warsaw, Poland
- Citizenship: Poland, Israel
- Education: Chopin University of Music; University of Warsaw
- Occupation: Klezmer vocalist
- Years active: 2011–present
- Spouse: Shlomi Mieleszczuk
- Children: 2
- Website: www.youtube.com/@Olginiam

Olga Avigail Mieleszczuk is a singer, accordion player, and researcher of Eastern European musical folklore. She is known for singing Ashkenazi Jewish songs in Yiddish. In 2012, Olga Mieleszczuk converted to Orthodox Judaism and acquired the first name Avigail. She currently lives in Israel.

Mieleszczuk was born in Warsaw to a Polish Catholic family. She received a Bachelor of Arts in classical music from the Chopin University of Music in Warsaw and a Master of Science in cultural anthropology from the University of Warsaw. After enrolling in a course on Yiddish music created by Warsaw's Shalom Foundation, she focused on Ashkenazi Jewish music, particularly that from the Eastern Borderlands of Poland. She also studied Chassidic music, Yiddish folk songs, and Jewish songs in different languages. Her interest in Jewish culture was sparked by an interfaith visit to Auschwitz.

Mieleszczuk's musical projects include Jewish Polesye, Li-La-Lo (based on the Yiddish-language cabarets of Poland called kleynkunst and Tel Aviv), and Jewish Tango.

Mieleszczuk has two children with her husband, Shlomi, who is of Kurdish descent.

== Albums ==
- 2012: Jewish Folksongs From The Shtetl
- 2017: Yiddish Tango Live in Jerusalem (with Tango Attack Band )
- 2021: Songs From The Bible Times Till Today
