= Leon Prudovsky =

Israeli film director, producer, screenwriter & actor (born 1978)

Leon (Leonid) Prudovsky
- לאון פרודובסקי
- Born: May 24, 1978 (age 48); Leningrad, USSR
- Other name: Leon Prudovsky
- Occupations: Film director, producer, scriptwriter and actor.
- Years active: 2003-present

Leon Prudovsky (Hebrew: לאון פרודובסקי; Russian: Леонид Прудовский; born May 24, 1978) is an Israeli film director, producer, screenwriter and actor.

== Biography ==
Leon (Leonid) Prudovsky was born in 1978 in Leningrad, USSR (today: St. Petersburg, Russia) and immigrated to Israel at the age of 13. He graduated from Tel Aviv University, the Film and TV department in 2004. His diploma work, a short film Dark Night, was nominated for Student Academy Award in 2005, and won numerous awards in prestigious international film festivals such as 62nd Venice International Film Festival, Jerusalem Film Festival, Beijing, Palm Springs International Film Festival, New York, Bucharest and many others.

In 2006 he co-wrote and directed a TV hour film Like a Fish out of Water for channel 2, winning several TV awards as well as nomination for Israeli TV Academy. In 2009 he co-wrote and directed his first feature film Five Hours from Paris, selected as a Discovery for Toronto International Film Festival and winning Haifa, Napoli and Nice Film Festivals. In 2010 he directed a 4-episodes series Troyka, featuring leading Israeli and Russian actors. He served as an artistic adviser for the Israeli Film Fund and the Jerusalem Film Fund, a script adviser for Tel Aviv University and Sam Spiegel Film School in Jerusalem and directed promotional clips for TV during many years. His last short film Welcome and … Our Condolences premiered in Haifa International Film Festival.

== Filmography ==
=== As director and writer ===
- 2003 – Occasional Rain (short)
- 2004 – Roads to Kefar Qasem (documentary)
- 2005 – Dark Night (short)
- 2007 – Like a Fish Out of Water (TV movie)
- 2009 – Five Hours from Paris (feature film)
- 2010 – Troika (series)
- 2011 – Welcome and … Our Condolences
- 2014-15 - Semeynyy albom (en: Family Album) (TV series) - TV premiere: 2016
- 2022 – My Neighbor Adolf

=== As producer ===
- 2002 – Brother and Sister (executive producer)
- 2006 – Nes

=== As second unit director or assistant director ===
- 2004 – Veronica (assistant director)

=== As actor ===
- 2006 – Nes: as bartender
- 2007 – Like a Fish Out of Water: as immigrant

== Awards ==
- 2005:
  - Best Short Film award and special mention at 62nd Venice International Film Festival for the movie Dark Night;
  - Television Drama Award - Honorable Mention at the Jerusalem Film Festival for the movie Dark Night;
- 2006:
  - award in Best Film category, at the Cittadella del Corto - International Short Film Festival for the movie Dark Night;
  - nomination for the Golden Pardino - Leopards of Tomorrow in the category East of the Mediterranean, at the Locarno International Film Festival for the movie Dark Night;
  - Audience Award in the Best Live Action category, at the Palm Springs International ShortFest for the movie Dark Night;
- 2009: Israeli Film Competition Award in the category: best film, at the Haifa International Film Festival for the movie Five Hours from Paris;
- 2011: Best Film award in the feature film category, at the Napoli Film Festival (I) for the movie Five Hours from Paris;
- 2013: Youth Jury Award in the international competition at the Clermont-Ferrand International Short Film Festival for the film Welcome and … Our Condolences;
