= LGBTQ rights in Israel =

- Legal status: Legal since 1988 (but no record of enforcement of "buggery" law before this, and the Attorney General declared that laws against homosexuality would not be enforced against consenting adults in 1953, reinforced by a Supreme Court decision in 1963)
- Gender identity: Legal sex change possible
- Military: Mandatory Enlistment includes LGBTQ people serving openly
- Discrimination protections: Sexual orientation protection in employment and other services; both sexual orientation and gender identity protections in schools (see below)

Family rights
- Recognition of relationships: Unregistered cohabitation since 1994; Same-sex marriages performed outside of Israel recognized since 2006, recognition of same-sex unions inside Tel-Aviv Yafo since 2020
- Restrictions: Only marriages sanctioned by the religious authorities may be performed within Israel (this also applies to opposite-sex couples who are not eligible for religious weddings), civil marriages (including same-sex marriages) performed elsewhere recognized
- Adoption: Same-sex couples allowed to adopt

Israel pride flag

Lesbian, gay, bisexual, transgender, and queer (LGBTQ) rights in Israel are considered the most developed in the Middle East and one of the most developed in Asia. Although same-sex sexual activity was legalized in 1988, the former law against sodomy had not been enforced against consenting adults following a directive from the Attorney General in 1953 and a Supreme Court decision in 1963. Israel became the first country in Asia to recognize unregistered cohabitation between same-sex couples, making it the first country in Asia to recognize same-sex unions in any capacity. Although same-sex marriages are not performed in the country, since Israel does not have civil non-religious marriages, and none of the recognized religious marriage institutions within the country perform same-sex marriages, Israeli law recognizes civil marriages (including same-sex marriages since 2006) performed elsewhere with the same legal rights as marriages performed in Israel. Discrimination on the grounds of sexual orientation was prohibited in 1992. Same-sex couples are allowed to jointly adopt, following a landmark court decision in 2008. Previously, stepchild adoption, as well as limited co-guardianship rights for non-biological parents, were permitted. LGBTQ people are also allowed to serve openly in the military.

Tel Aviv was referred to by the Calgary Herald as one of the most gay-friendly cities in the world, famous for its annual Pride parade and gay beach, earning it the nickname "the gay capital of the Middle East" by Out magazine. According to users of the website GayCities, it was ranked as the best gay city in 2011, despite reports of some anti-LGBTQ violence during the 2000s, which were criticized by Prime Minister Benjamin Netanyahu and President Shimon Peres. A monument dedicated to the gay victims of the Holocaust was erected in Tel Aviv in 2014.

In 2018, an opinion poll commissioned by an Israeli television channel Channel 10 News reported that 58% of Israeli citizens support the legalization of same-sex marriage, however in 2023 an international poll commissioned by the Pew Research Center reported that only 36% of Israeli citizens support same-sex marriage, while 56% oppose it.

According to a 2025 data from the Pew Research Center, 47% of Israelis view homosexuality as "morally unacceptable". This figure is significantly higher than in many other developed nations, such as Spain (7%) or Sweden (5%).

On 21 June 2020, Tel Aviv-Yafo Municipality announced that same-sex couples would have exactly the same rights as opposite-sex marriages there, with this being provided by the municipality.

== Legality of same-sex sexual activity ==
The State of Israel inherited the Buggery Act 1533 as part of the British Mandate's legal code. There is no known record that it was ever enforced against homosexual acts that took place between consenting adults in private in the civilian judicial system. In certain cases, defendants were found guilty of "sodomy" (which according to Israeli law included oral sex as well), apparently by way of plea bargains: those defendants had been indicted for more serious sexual offenses, and homosexuality was also used as a case of "aggravating circumstances" for other sexual offenses. However, there were several cases of soldiers tried for homosexual acts in military courts.

In 1953, the Attorney General of Israel, Haim Cohn, issued a directive ordering the police to refrain from enforcing the law against homosexual acts between consenting adults. The Israeli Supreme Court likewise ruled in 1963 that the law should not be applied to acts between consenting adults in private. The ban on consensual same-sex sexual acts was formally repealed by the Knesset in 1988 by omitting it from criminal code. The age of consent for both homosexual and heterosexual acts is 16 years of age.

== Recognition of same-sex relationships ==
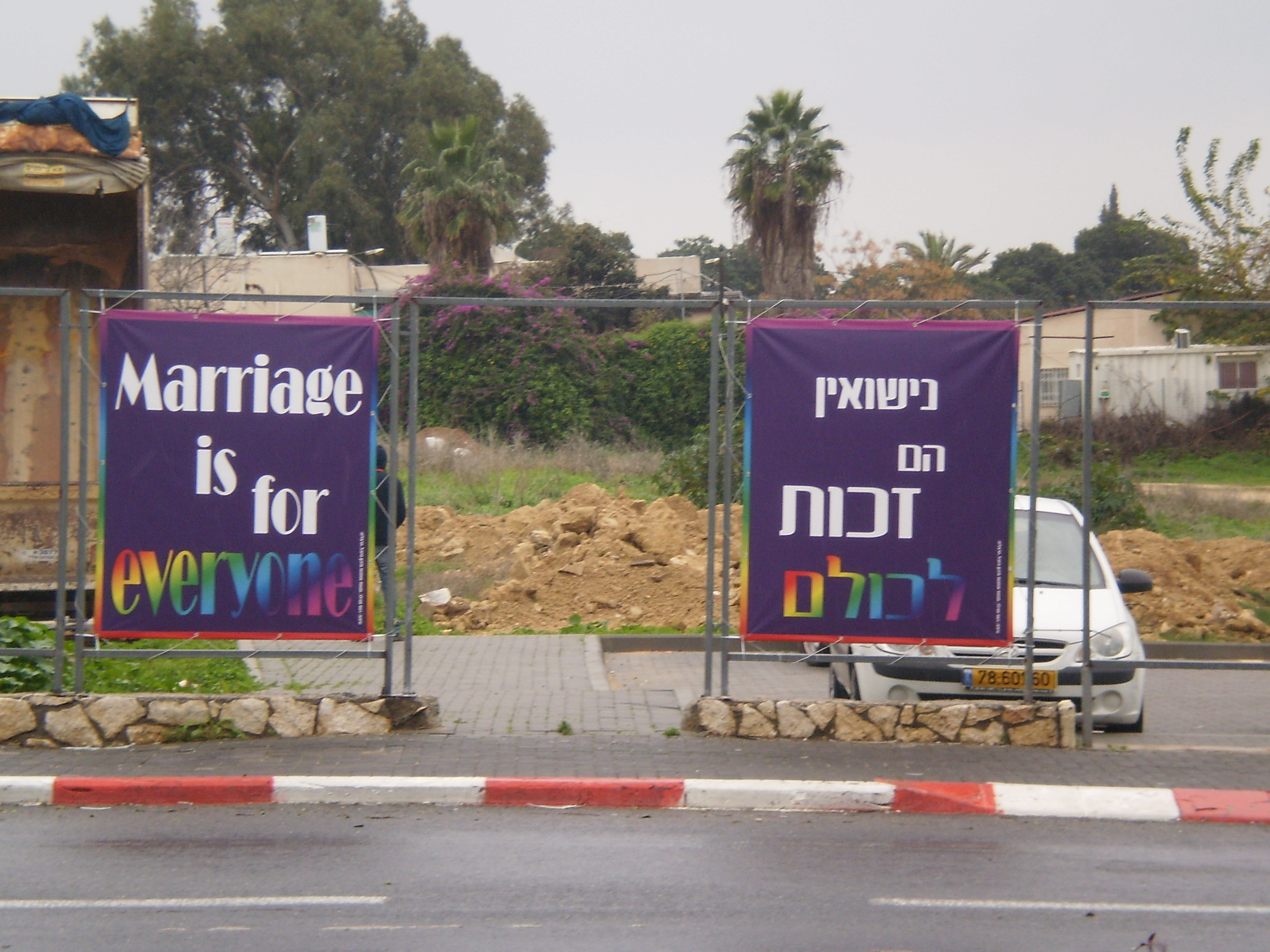
Signs supporting same-sex marriage in Herzliya, 2012

Public opinion on same-sex marriage (2023) based on Pew Research Center
1. Strongly favor (16.0%)
2. Somewhat favor (20.0%)
3. Not sure (8.00%)
4. Somewhat oppose (13.0%)
5. Strongly oppose (43.0%)

Between 1994 and 2007, numerous rights were granted to Israeli same-sex couples.

Same-sex marriage cannot legally be performed in Israel. Israeli law allows same-sex marriages performed elsewhere to be registered, but not recognized based upon a 2006 Israeli Supreme Court decision which stated:

Before we conclude, let us reemphasize what it is that we are deciding today, and what it is that we are not deciding today. We are deciding that within the context of the status of the population registry as a recorder of statistics, the registration official should register in the population register what is implied by the public certificate that is presented to him by the petitioners, according to which the petitioners are married and in view of the role of the registration official as a collector of statistical material for the purpose of managing the registry...We are not deciding that marriage between persons of the same sex is recognized in Israel; we are not recognizing a new status of such marriages; we are not adopting any position with regard to recognition in Israel of marriages between persons of the same sex that take place outside Israel (whether between Israeli residents or between persons who are not Israeli residents).

This ruling was based on a past precedent from the Funk-Schlesinger Case, which had similar rulings for interfaith marriages performed outside of Israel.

Civil marriage does not exist in Israel for heterosexual couples either (except where both heterosexual spouses do not belong to any of the recognized religious communities in the country), and therefore only a marriage sanctioned by the small number of officially recognized religious authorities can take place within Israel. (This restriction forces not only same-sex couples, but also all mixed-religion heterosexual couples and any person who wishes a non-religious marriage, to marry outside the country.)

The State of Israel allows foreign partners of its homosexual citizenry to receive residency permits. The Civil Service Commission extends spousal benefits and pensions to the partners of homosexual employees. The Israeli State Attorney's Office has extended the spousal exemption from property-transfer taxes to same-sex couples. Israel's Attorney General has granted legal recognition to same-sex couples in financial and other business matters. Attorney General Meni Mazuz said the couples will be treated the same as common-law spouses, recognizing them as legal units for tax, real estate, and financial purposes. Mazuz made his decision by refusing to appeal a district court ruling in an inheritance case that recognized the legality of a same-sex union, his office said in a statement. Mazuz did differentiate, however, between recognizing same-sex unions for financial and practical purposes, as he did, and changing the law to officially sanction the unions, which would be a matter for Parliament, according to the statement.

The city of Tel Aviv recognizes unmarried couples, including gays and lesbians, as family units and grants them discounts for municipal services. Under the bylaw, unmarried couples qualify for the same discounts on daycare and the use of swimming pools, sports facilities, and other city-sponsored activities that married couples enjoy. On 29 January 2007, following a Supreme Court ruling ordering them to do so, Jerusalem registered its first same-sex couple, Avi and Binyamin Rose.

In 2010, Israel's marriage law was amended with the passage of the Civil Union Law for Citizens with no Religious Affiliation, 2010, allowing an opposite-sex couple to form a civil union in Israel if they are both registered as officially not belonging to any religion.

There have been five failed legislative attempts in the Knesset to recognise same-sex unions. The first attempt was a civil marriage bill, which included provisions for same-sex marriages, introduced by Meretz. The bill was rejected in May 2012 in a 39 to 11 vote, with 70 not attending. The second and third attempts were two similar bills that would have provided for civil unions in Israel for both opposite-sex and same-sex couples; one introduced by Hatnuah, and the other by Yesh Atid. At the same time, Meretz proposed a civil marriage bill, which included provisions for same-sex marriages. On 8 July 2015, the Knesset rejected the Meretz and Yesh Atid bills, in a 39-50 vote, while Hatnuah's bill was rejected on 22 February 2016 in a 40-47 vote. In June 2018, the Knesset rejected a same-sex marriage bill introduced by The Zionist Union. The bill failed by just three votes, 39-42.

In June 2020, it was reported that Tel Aviv will explicitly recognize both civil unions and same-sex marriage from outside Israel. In November 2020, it was also reported that Ramat Gan also will explicitly recognize both civil unions and same-sex marriage from outside Israel. In January 2022 it was announced, that the city of Herzliya will recognize common-law partners / couples and will provide a new service for registering marriages based on an affidavit - confirmation of municipal recognition

== Adoption and parenting ==
Adoption by same-sex couples had only been permitted in certain restricted situations, notably when a previous connection exists between the adopting parent and the child, such as being a family member or a foster child. On 10 January 2005, the Supreme Court ruled that a lesbian couple can legally adopt each other's children. During the past 15 years that Tal and Avital Jarus-Hakak had lived together, they had a total of three children. The couple petitioned the Tel Aviv Family Court for the right to formally adopt each other's children in 1997, but the request was rejected because Israel's adoption law had no provisions for same-sex couples. The couple appealed. While they failed to get a favorable ruling in the Tel Aviv District Court, the Supreme Court accepted the case. Citing Article 25 of the Adoption of Children Law of 1981 (Hebrew: חוק אימוץ ילדים, תשמ"א-1981; Arabic: قانون تبني الأطفال 1981), the Jarus-Hakaks argued that the law allows for "special circumstances" for adoption when it is for the good of the child, even if the child's parents are still alive. The only condition is that the person seeking to adopt be single. The couple argued that since the state does not recognize same-sex marriage, they are single by law. They added that adoption was in the children's best interest if one of their natural mothers should die. The Supreme Court of Israel agreed, ruling 7–2 in favor of the couple. Following the Supreme Court ruling, the couple was allowed to adopt each other's biological children on 12 February 2006. Lesbian couples can also legally gain access to IVF and assisted insemination.

In February 2008, a court ruled that same-sex couples are now permitted to adopt a child even if that child is not biologically related to either parent. This marked a watershed in granting equal rights to gay people in Israel. isRealli, the official, but now defunct, blog of the State of Israel, frequently published updates on gay adoption news in Israel. On 10 March 2009, the Tel Aviv Family Court ruled that former Knesset member Uzi Even and his partner, Amit Kama, could legally adopt their 30-year-old foster son, Yossi, making them the first same-sex male couple in Israel whose right of adoption was legally acknowledged.

On 28 January 2014, the Israel High Court of Justice ruled in favor of a May 2013 modification by Israel Attorney General Yehuda Weinstein and stated that same-sex couples in Israel could easily adopt through surrogacy so long as the biological parent in the same-sex relationship was willing to take a paternity test or present highly convincing alternative medical and legal evidence of paternity. Prior to the 2013 modification, both a paternity test by the biological parent and a lengthy legal process by the non-biological parent were required in order for a joint adoption to take place for same-sex couples participating in surrogacy. This ruling was further enhanced in August 2016 when the Tel Aviv Family Court ruled that Israeli same-sex couples could adopt through surrogacy from individuals residing in either Israel or from other countries.

In late August 2017, the Israeli Government announced that it no longer opposes same-sex adoption and that new criteria for adoption would be enacted. Under the new criteria, the potential parents can legally adopt a child, regardless of their sexual orientation; opposite-sex and same-sex couples being given equal treatment. Previously, same-sex couples could only adopt children opposite-sex couples did not want to adopt. From 2008 to 2017, only 3 same-sex couples (out of 550 applicants) were able to adopt, compared to 1,000 opposite-sex adoptions. According to a poll conducted earlier in August 2017, 60% of Israelis supported adoption rights for same-sex couples, while 33% were against. As of 2019, however, the Justice Minister has blocked the criteria.

Israeli surrogacy law allows opposite-sex couples to sign a surrogacy agreement with a surrogate mother. In July 2018, the Knesset passed a bill expending surrogacy rights to single women, but rejected an amendment that would have included same-sex couples. Prime Minister Benjamin Netanyahu supported the amendment, but later voted against it due to objections from Orthodox groups. Subsequently, an estimated 100,000 people marched in Tel Aviv in protest. The protests also received support from multiple companies, including Apple Inc., Microsoft, Israir Airlines and many more, and an opinion poll conducted in July 2018 found that 57% of Israelis were in favour of surrogacy for same-sex couples. Despite the passage of the law, several court rulings have protected surrogacy rights for same-sex couples. In February 2020, the Israeli Supreme Court unanimously ruled that same-sex couples should be given access to surrogacy, holding that the current law harms the "right to equality" and gave the state one year to amend the existing legislation.

In July 2018, the Israeli High Court proposed to make it easier for children raised by same-sex couples to be registered on official documents with the names of both their parents. Under the proposal, the non-biological parent would have to send a notice to the Interior Ministry. However, the Israeli Government rejected this measure, and insisted that same-sex couples should receive a court order if they wish to register their child(ren) with both their names. In December 2018, the High Court of Justice ruled that same-sex parents have the right to be listed on their child(ren)'s birth certificates. In a landmark case, the top court ruled that the Interior Ministry cannot refuse this right based on the parent's sexual orientation. The ruling came after two gay men adopted a son, then tried to list both their names on his birth certificate, but government officials refused to do so. Supreme Court Justice Neal Hendel said in the decision:

The principle of "the good of the child" argues for the recording of his entire family unit, and doesn't permit us to limit ourselves to only one of his parents in the birth certificate…. The contrast with the treatment of a child adopted by a heterosexual couple, who has the right to have both adopted parents written in a birth certificate, is a contrast that applies both to the child and to the parents... It is unreasonable for the couple to be [legally] recognized as parents but for the certificate not to give expression to that fact.

On 11 July 2021, the Israeli High Court ruled that the amendment to the Surrogacy Law enacted in 2018, which discriminates against same-sex couples, will be amended by a High Court order, and will enter into force within six months. In January 2022, allowing same-sex couples and singles to legally access surrogacy goes into legal effect.

=== Two mothers on birth certificates ===
In March 2024, the Israel Supreme Court ordered that a child and children of "both two parties of the female same-sex couple" - must be corrected as well as an updated birth certificate automatically.

== Gender identity and expression ==
Treatment for gender dysphoria in Israel can be paid for using the country's public health insurance system if a patient receives approval by the Committee for Sex Reassignment operating out of Sheba Medical Center in Tel HaShomer, which consists of an endocrinologist, a urologist, and a plastic surgeon and is organized by the Health Ministry. All sex reassignment surgery operations in Israel are furthermore performed by Dr. Haim Kaplan at Sheba Medical Center under this committee's approval. However, many transgender Israelis have had trouble getting approval for treatment by this committee due to their stringent opinions on gender dysphoria. Thus, many pay out of pocket for hormone replacement therapy and/or go overseas for sex reassignment surgery.

A bill was introduced to the Knesset in June 2013 to eliminate gender markers on National Identity Cards, but it did not pass. In 2024, the Knesset passed a law allowing transgender individuals to remove their deadname from ID cards. Israeli law previously required individuals to record all previous names on their ID cards regardless of gender identity.

Since 2015, the Health Ministry has allowed transgender people to change legal gender without undergoing sex reassignment surgery or a sex change operation.

== Military service ==
There were several cases of soldiers being tried for homosexual acts until decisions by the Israeli Supreme Court and Attorney General prohibited sodomy laws from being enforced against consensual acts between adults. In 1956, the Military Court of Appeals heard a case of two male soldiers who had been sentenced to a year in prison for consensual sexual activity, and downgraded the sentences to one day in prison for one of them and 70 days for the one ruled to have instigated the encounter after accepting the testimony of a psychologist, Dr. Skali Avraham, that homosexual behavior was deviant but not criminal. In 1977, the Military Advocate General, Brigadier General Zvi Inbar, issued a set of directives – "The Trying of Homosexual Soldiers" – to all military prosecutors, instructing them to only file charges against soldiers who committed homosexual acts if: one of the parties involved was a minor, the sex was non-consensual, one of the parties was unconscious, the sex was conducted in public, or one of the soldiers was under the command of the other.

In 1983, the IDF adopted a policy that gay personnel would not be limited or discharged solely based on their sexual orientation, but it did prohibit gay service members from taking intelligence positions, other jobs requiring a top-secret clearance, or serving in elite combat units. Officers were also required to refer known gay soldiers for a psychological evaluation to determine whether they posed any security risks or were mentally unfit for service, though commanders did sometimes disregard this policy.

In 1993, the IDF formally opened the draft to all regardless of sexual orientation. In 1998, the IDF ceased to link sexual orientation to security clearances and rescinded a standing order that required commanding officers to report gay soldiers for evaluation.

Openly gay, lesbian and bisexual soldiers serve without hindrance in all branches of the military. Discrimination against gay, lesbian and bisexual soldiers in recruitment, placement and promotion is prohibited in Israel. Harassment on the grounds of sexual orientation is also prohibited in the Israeli military. The military recognizes same-sex couples, including widows and widowers of the same sex. Soldiers are also allowed to participate in gay pride parades. The Israel Defense Forces currently does not consider gender dysphoria to be a disqualifying condition for service. Furthermore, the IDF considers certain transition-specific medical treatment (hormone replacement therapy and sex reassignment surgery) and counseling to be medically necessary for those diagnosed with transsexualism and thus pays for said treatments. The IDF also determines gender specific army regulations (length of service, which gender to be housed with, whether they are to wear a male or female uniform, etc.) on a case-by-case basis for its transgender soldiers. However, given that Israeli law makes it difficult for transgender individuals to begin transition until they reach 18, the draft age, and does not normally allow for sex reassignment surgery to be performed before the age of 21, currently the only person who underwent surgery while serving is Shachar Erez, the first openly transgender person to become an officer. Furthermore, many draftees diagnosed with gender dysphoria can receive exemption from military service at their own request. Officially, the IDF policy does not prohibit intersex persons from service.

== LGBTQ immigration to Israel and the Law of Return ==
On 10 June 2011, the Law of Return was tested when a gay male couple from the United States, one Jewish and one Catholic, made Aliyah to Israel. This couple was the first same-sex, different-religion married couple to request joint Aliyah status, although opposite-sex married couples of different religions receive joint Aliyah as a matter of course. The Jewish man quickly received citizenship but the decision of citizenship for his husband was delayed by the Ministry of the Interior despite the clause in the law saying the spouse of the Jewish immigrant must also be granted citizenship. On 10 August 2011, the Ministry of the Interior granted citizenship to the non-Jewish husband as required by the Law of Return. In 2014, Interior Minister Gidon Sa'ar officially decided that, according to the Law of Return, Jews in same-sex relationships married abroad wishing to immigrate to Israel can do so—even if their partners are not Jewish—and both they and their partners will receive Israeli citizenship.

In December 2016, Attorney General Avichai Mandelblit issued an instruction to Israel's Interior Ministry to consider applications for citizenship by same-sex and opposite-sex couples equally under the same terms. The same-sex spouse of an Israeli citizen will now be able to claim Israeli citizenship at the same speed as an opposite-sex spouse. Previously, same-sex couples had to wait up to seven years, and would generally only be granted permanent residency rather than citizenship. The process was far quicker for opposite-sex couples. The decision came in response to a lawsuit filed before the High Court of Justice by the Gay Fathers Association.

== Discrimination protections ==
LGBTQ couples in Israel have the same pension, inheritance and medical rights as non-LGBTQ couples. In 1992, legislation was passed into law to prohibit employment discrimination on the basis of sexual orientation, with some exemptions for religious organizations. In 1997, an amendment was added to the nation's Libel and Slander Law. The amendment broadened the prohibition of uttering and publishing defamation and slander, motivated by the sexual orientation of a person. Moreover, the law specifies that every violent crime, motivated by sexual orientation, shall be considered a hate crime, doubling the punishment. The Prohibition of Discrimination in Products, Services and Entry into Places of Entertainment and Public Places Law, 2000 (Hebrew: חוק איסור הפליה במוצרים, בשירותים ובכניסה למקומות בידור ולמקומות ציבוריים; Arabic: حظر التمييز في المنتجات والخدمات والدخول إلى أماكن الترفيه والأماكن العامة) prohibits discrimination based on sexual orientation, among others, on the part of those who provide products, public services or operate public places.

In April 2020, the Beersheba Magistrate's Court ruled that a local print shop must compensate an LGBTQ rights group after it refused to print its posters. The court held that "When their beliefs conflict with a necessity of providing service to all in a public space, the last value holds superior".

== Conversion therapy ==
In October 2014, the Ministry of Health issued a statement announcing that it considers conversion therapy to "create false impressions of scientific recognition even though there is no scientific evidence that it is at all successful. It may also cause harm to the individual." The Ministry created a complaints committee to investigate allegations of conversion therapy by mental health professionals. According to February 2017 reports, none of the 20 complaints filed had been dealt with by the committee, which had not been convening on a monthly basis as it was supposed to. Several MKs, namely Yael German and Eyal Ben-Reuven, have called the committee "dysfunctional".

In February 2016, the Knesset rejected a bill introduced by former Health Minister Yael German that would have banned conversion therapy in Israel for minors. The bill was rejected 37-45.

In January 2019, the Israel Medical Association, which represents about 90% of all physicians in Israel, explicitly banned all its members from performing any conversion therapy on patients.

In July 2019, interim Minister of Education Rafi Peretz attracted criticism after he endorsed the pseudoscientific practice and claimed to have personally performed such therapies. Prime Minister Benjamin Netanyahu rejected Peretz's comments as unacceptable, saying they "do not represent [his] government's position" and that "[he] made it clear to him that the Israeli educational system will continue to accept all Jewish children whoever they are and without any difference based on sexual orientation." Thousands of Israeli teachers signed a petition demanding Perez's dismissal, and more than a thousand people protested his comments in Tel Aviv and in Peretz's hometown calling for his resignation, with the presence of former Israeli Prime Minister Ehud Barak. Days later, Peretz backtracked from his comments, calling conversion therapy "inappropriate", but added that "individuals with a homosexual orientation have the right to receive professional help". Following his comments, hundreds of LGBTQ Israelis recounted their "painful" and "destructive" experiences with conversion therapy.

Several conversion therapy advocates and licensed professionals have moved to Israel from the United States, due to a growing number of bans on the pseudoscientific practice there. The Israel Psychological Association opposes conversion therapy.

In July 2020, Israeli MP's passed a bill to begin the process to outlaw conversion therapy, being the first Middle East country to do so. The bill was passed as two of the main coalition parties joined the opposition in supporting it. It must pass two more approvals to become a new law.

== Blood donation ==
Since 1 June 2017, gay and bisexual men in Israel have been allowed to legally donate blood following a one-year deferral period. However, no deferral was in place for lesbians or bisexual women.

In January 2018, the Health Ministry approved a pilot allowing gay and bisexual men to donate blood, regardless of when they last had sex.

From October 2021, gay and bisexual men can donate blood, regardless of when they last had sex.

== Other court rulings ==
- The Supreme Court ruled on 30 November 1994 that the partner of a gay employee at El Al, Israel's national airline, is entitled to free airline tickets just as the spouse of any heterosexual employee is.
- The Supreme Court recognized in May 2000 a lesbian as the adoptive mother of the four-year-old biological son of her same-sex partner, and ordered the Interior Ministry to register the adoption.
- An Israeli family court on 17 March 2002 turned down an application from a lesbian couple to have their partnership union declared legal. The couple was united in a civil ceremony in Germany. The women wanted the court to recognize their partnership as a civil marriage under Israeli law. The court said that since the women are not recognized as a family under Israeli law, the court is not authorized to rule on their case. A government lawyer who was asked by the court to give a legal opinion on the case on behalf of the Israeli Government said that the state objected to granting the request.
- On 14 November 2004, the Nazareth District Court ruled that same-sex couples have the same inheritance rights as married couples. This ruling overturned a Family Court ruling that an elderly man from Kiryat Shmona was not entitled to spousal rights. The man had sought the estate of his late partner, with whom he lived for several decades. The Nazareth judges ruled that the term "man and woman" as spelled out in Israel's inheritance law also includes same-sex couples. Judges Nissim Maman and Gabriela Levy, who issued the majority opinion, based their decision on a loose interpretation of the term "partner" as defined in other court rulings, such as those dealing with issues related to employee benefits, and thus applied the interpretation to the inheritance law. The acting president of the Nazareth District Court, Menachem Ben-David, issued the minority opinion, arguing that the legal text should not be interpreted "contrary to the lingual significance". A government spokesperson said the ruling would be appealed.
- In December 2004, the Tel Aviv District Court ruled that the state cannot deport the Colombian partner of a gay Israeli man. The 32-year-old Colombian entered Israel on a visitors visa which had long expired and the Interior Ministry had ordered him deported. His partner is an Israeli citizen and a soldier in the Israel Defense Forces. The couple filed an emergency petition with the Tel Aviv District Court. The men were represented by the Association for Civil Rights in Israel. Judge Uzi Vogelman ruled that the state had acted illegally in attempting to deport the man. In 1999, a Supreme Court ruling established that the ministry could not deport foreign nationals married to Israeli citizens. Vogelman's decision extends that decision to apply to common-law marriages, including same-sex couples.
- In March 2008, Israel's Interior Ministry granted a gay Palestinian from Jenin a rare residency permit to live with his partner of 8 years in Tel Aviv after he said his sexuality put his life in danger in the West Bank.
- In 2012, the first same-sex Israeli couple was granted a divorce by an Israeli family court. The divorce of Tel Aviv University Professor Uzi Even, the first openly gay Knesset member, and Dr. Amit Kama was granted by the Ramat Gan Family Court, according to Haaretz, which ordered the Interior Minister to register their status as divorced.
- In December 2016, Attorney General Avichai Mandelblit issued an instruction to Israel's Interior Ministry to consider applications for citizenship by same-sex and opposite-sex couples equally under the same terms.

== Politics ==
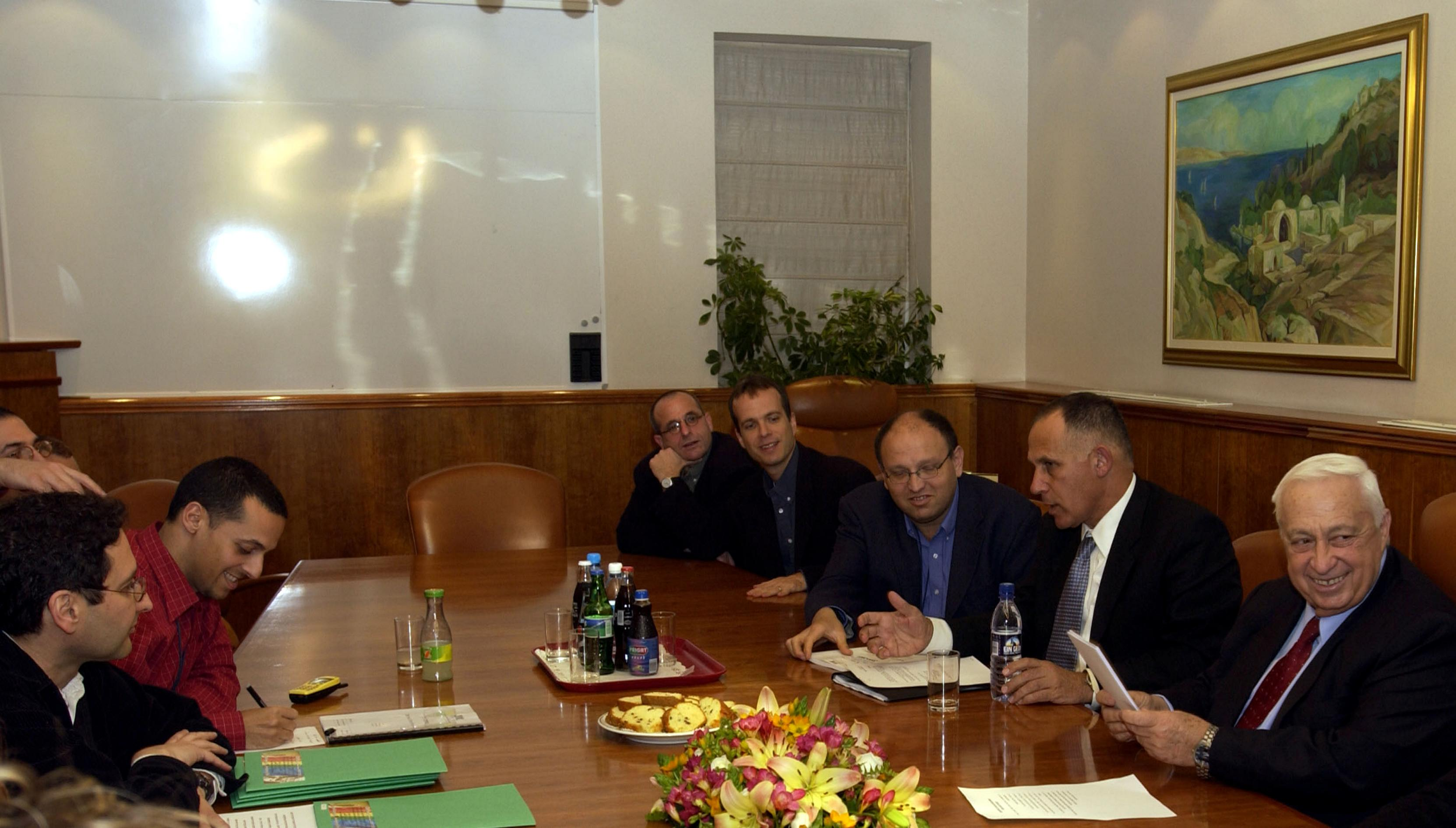
Ariel Sharon meeting with representatives of the LGBTQ community in Jerusalem, 2002

Israel's Labor Party and Meretz support LGBTQ rights, as did the now-defunct Shinui. Under Tzipi Livni, Kadima has reached out to the LGBTQ community. Other minor liberal or progressive political parties support a similar platform as well, including the Greens and the Green Leaf Party. Officials from a number of parties, including Yael German of Yesh Atid, Limor Livnat of the ruling Likud-Beiteinu, and openly gay Nitzan Horowitz of Meretz, back same-sex marriage and have pledged support for LGBTQ causes. Representatives from other parties, including Hatnuah, Hadash and the Labor Party, have also pledged support. Minister and MK Limor Livnat, however, did state that getting the ruling Likud-Beiteinu to legislate for same-sex marriage would be difficult due to differing opinions concerning the issue within the party, but promised to do her utmost to get her party behind the issue.

On 22 October 2002, Meretz MK Uzi Even made history by becoming the first openly gay member of the Knesset. Five more openly gay Israelis—Nitzan Horowitz, Itzik Smuli, Yorai Lahav-Hertzanu, Idan Roll and Amir Ohana—have been elected to the Knesset since then. In 2019, after the April general elections, a record-breaking five openly gay MKs were elected. They are Itzik Smuli (Labor), Amir Ohana (Likud), Eitan Ginzburg, Idan Roll and Yorai Lahav-Hertzanu (each being a member of Blue and White).

In 2018, the city of Ra'anana elected Eitan Ginzburg (he later became an MK) as mayor, making him the first openly gay mayor in Israel.

In 2019, ahead of the September legislative election, Nitzan Horowitz successfully challenged incumbent Tamar Zandberg for the leadership of Meretz, which made Meretz the first Israeli party to elect an openly gay person as its leader.

In July 2019, Prime Minister Benjamin Netanyahu appointed Evan Cohen, a linguist and LGBTQ rights activist, as the foreign media spokesperson.

Nevertheless, there still have been anti-gay politicians. In 1997, President Ezer Weizman compared homosexuality to alcoholism in front of high school students. This provoked major controversy, and the President received numerous calls from civil rights activists and liberal Knesset members. Shortly following, 300 people demonstrated outside of Weizman's residence, demanding his resignation. He later apologised for these statements. On 20 February 2008, Shlomo Benizri, a Knesset member from the religious Shas party, a member of Prime Minister Ehud Olmert's ruling coalition, blamed earthquakes that had recently struck the Middle East on the activities of homosexuals. Benizri said in a Knesset plenary session, "Why do earthquakes happen? ... One of the reasons is the things to which the Knesset gives legitimacy, to sodomy." He recommended that instead of merely reinforcing buildings to withstand earthquakes, the Government should pass legislation to outlaw "perversions like adoptions by gay couples". Benizri stated that, "A cost-effective way of averting earthquake damage would be to stop passing legislation on how to encourage homosexual activity in the State of Israel, which anyways causes earthquakes."

In 2015, Bezalel Smotrich, a Knesset member from the Orthodox-religious Jewish Home party, referred to LGBTQ people as "abnormal", stating: "At home, everyone can be abnormal, and people can form whatever family unit they want. But they can't make demands from me, as the state." In the same discussion, he told the audience, "I am a proud homophobe". He later apologized, and retracted his statement, saying: "Someone shouted from the crowd, and I responded inattentively". In July 2015, after the Jerusalem LGBTQ pride stabbing, Smotrich called it a "beast parade", and refused to retract his homophobic remarks. In August 2015, Smotrich accused LGBTQ organizations of controlling the media, claiming they use their control to gain public sympathy and silence those who share his conservative views. An Israeli NGO, Ometz, filed a complaint with the Knesset Ethics Committee to intervene and investigate Smotrich's comments.

On 23 February 2016, the Knesset marked the first LGBTQ rights day, but on 24 February 2016, the parties that form the governing coalition, Likud, United Torah Judaism, Shas, Kulanu, and the Jewish Home, supported by opposition members, defeated bills to recognize bereaved widowers, ban conversion therapy, recognize same-sex marriage, and train health professionals to deal with gender and sexual orientation issues.

Two days before the April 2019 legislative election, Prime Minister Benjamin Netanyahu hosted a group of representatives of the LGBTQ community at the Prime Minister's residence for the first time in 10 years. Although the meeting was described as "warm" and "good", representatives of the LGBTQ community were disappointed after the meeting ended with the refusal of Netanyahu to make promises to advance pro-LGBTQ legislation due to the pressure of right-wing religious and ultra-Orthodox coalition parties.

In July 2019, interim Education Minister Rafi Peretz attracted criticism from when he endorsed conversion therapy. Prime Minister Benjamin Netanyahu rejected Peretz's comments as unacceptable, saying that they "do not represent [his] government's position" and that "[he] made it clear to him that the Israeli educational system will continue to accept all Jewish children whoever they are and without any difference based on sexual orientation." Thousands of Israeli teachers signed a petition demanding his resignation, and more than a thousand people protested his comments in Tel Aviv and in Peretz's hometown, calling for his dismissal. Days layer, Peretz backtracked from his comments, labelling conversion therapy "inappropriate", but added that "individuals with a homosexual orientation have the right to receive professional help".

In June 2019, Jerusalem city inspectors took down a Pride banner hung by the US embassy for LGBTQ Pride Month. Deputy mayor Arieh King had ordered the removal.

== Society ==
=== Living conditions ===
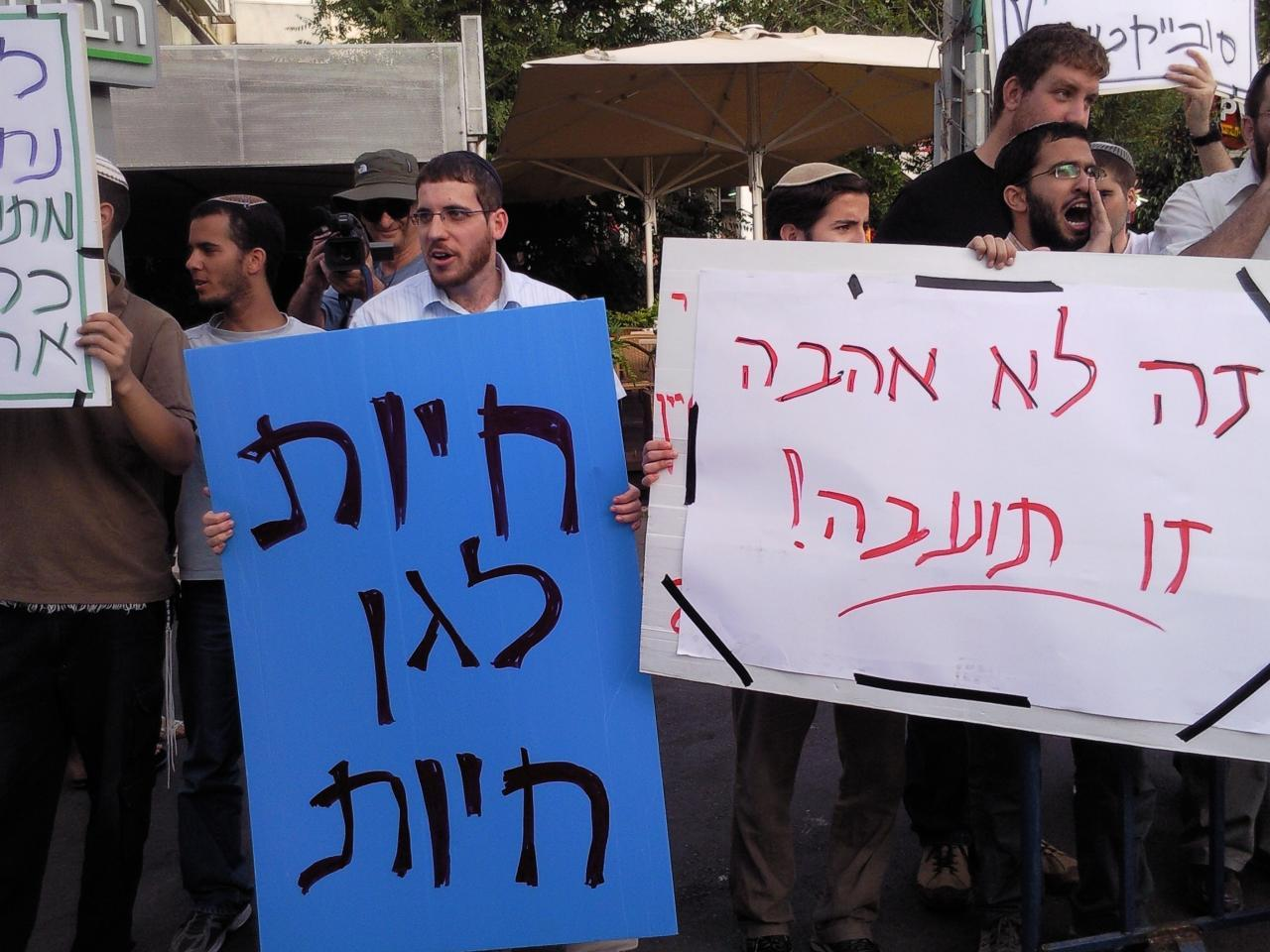
Orthodox Jewish protesters during the Gay Pride parade in Haifa, Israel (2010)

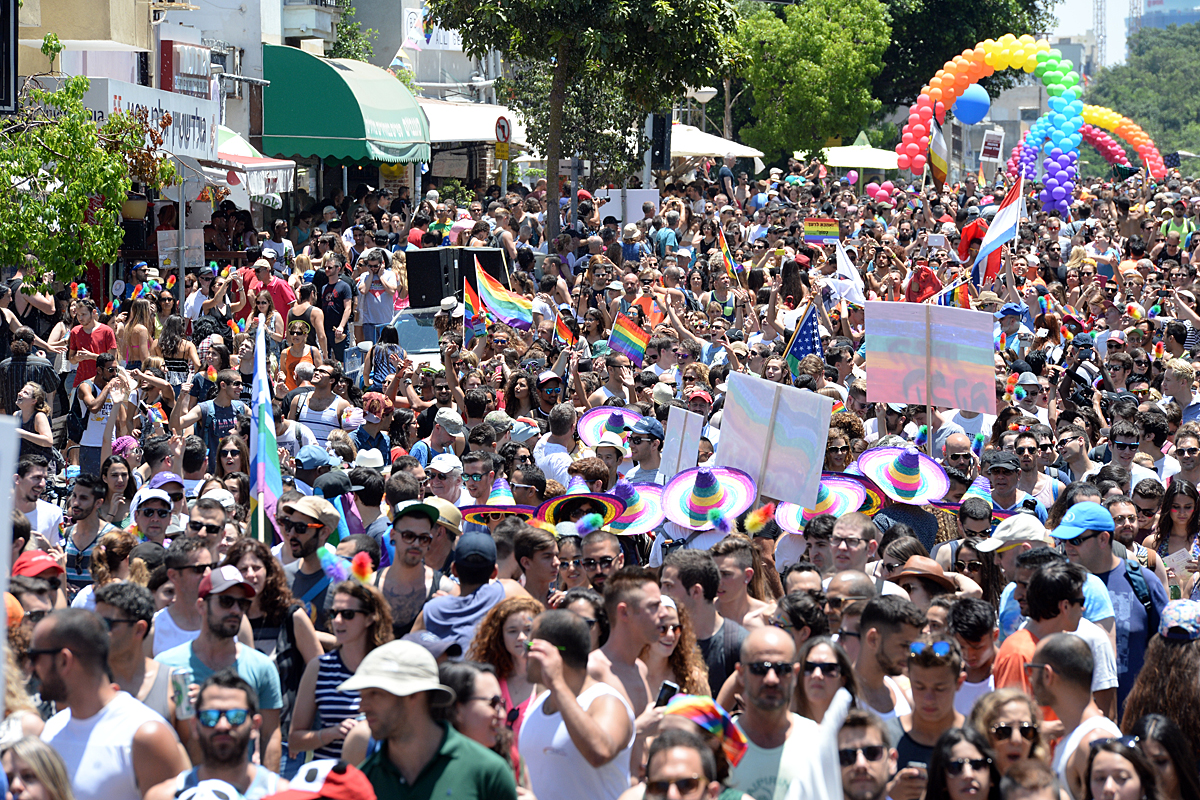
The 2015 Tel Aviv Pride parade

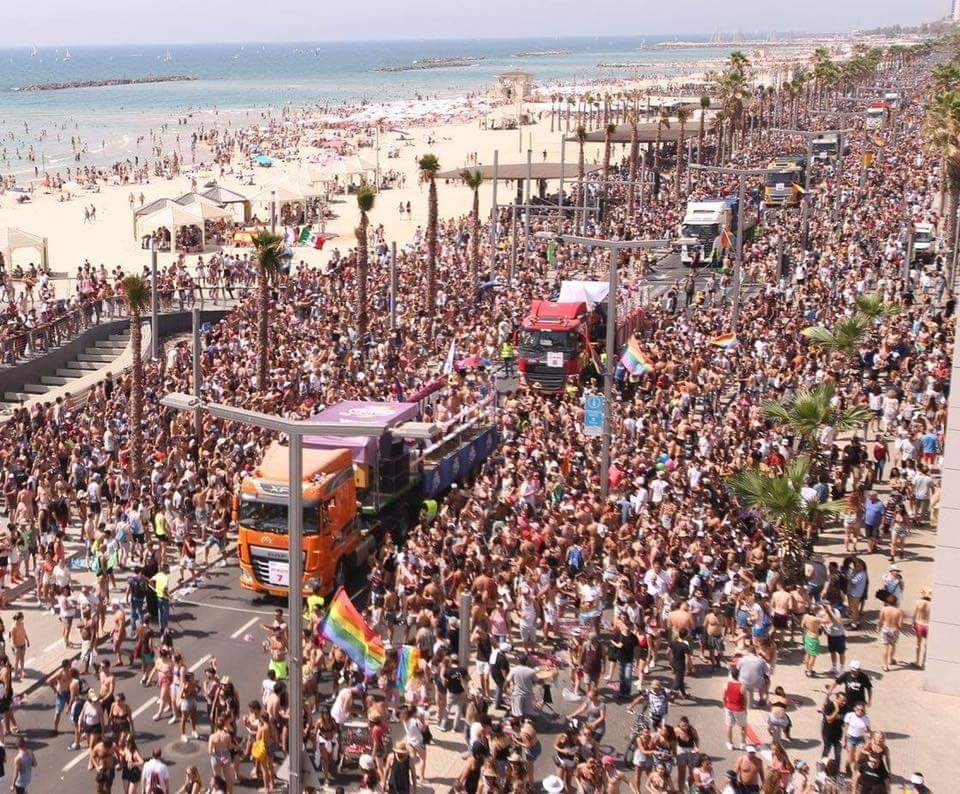
The 2018 Tel Aviv Pride parade

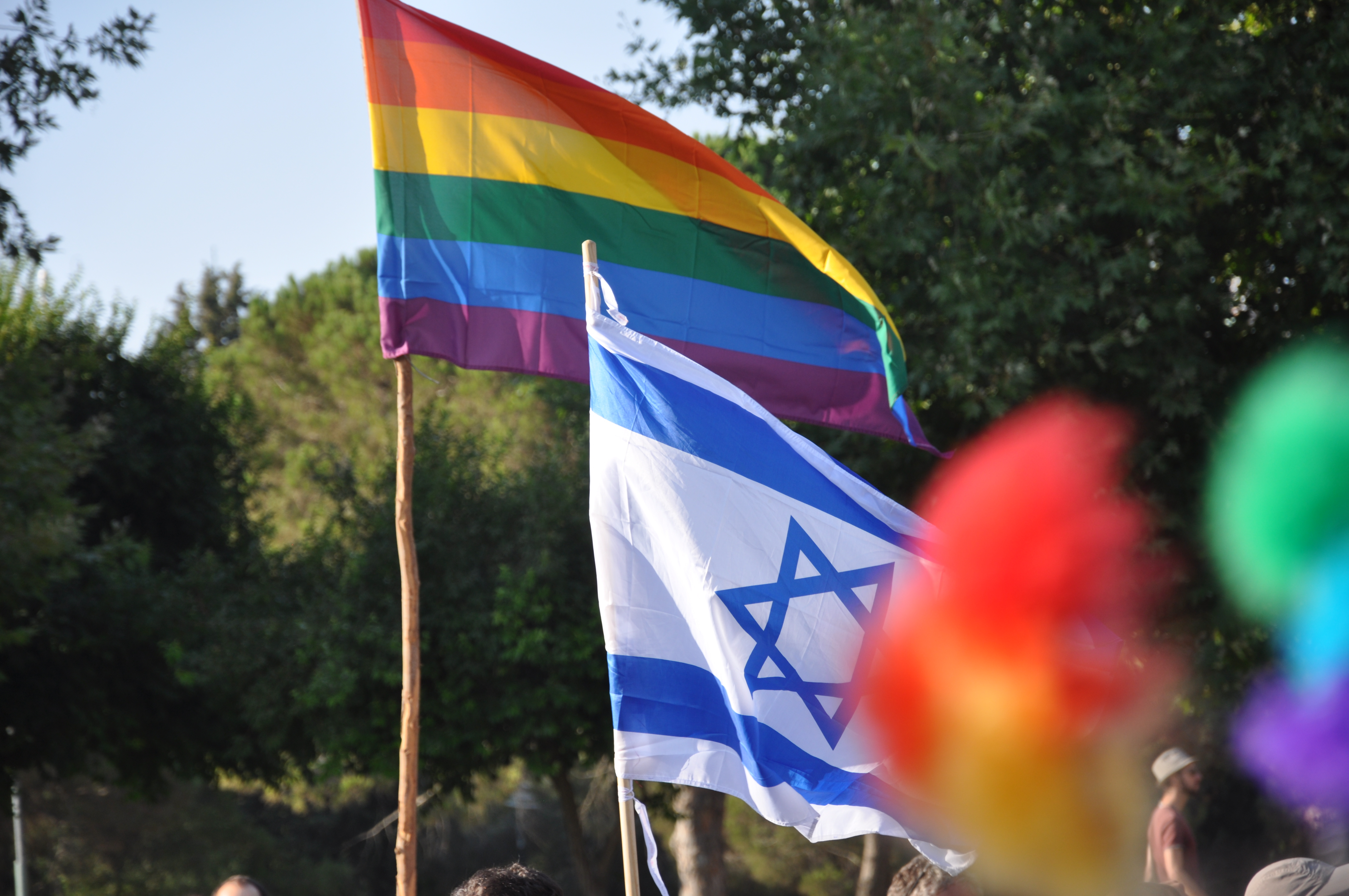
An LGBTQ and Israeli flag at the 2012 Jerusalem Pride parade

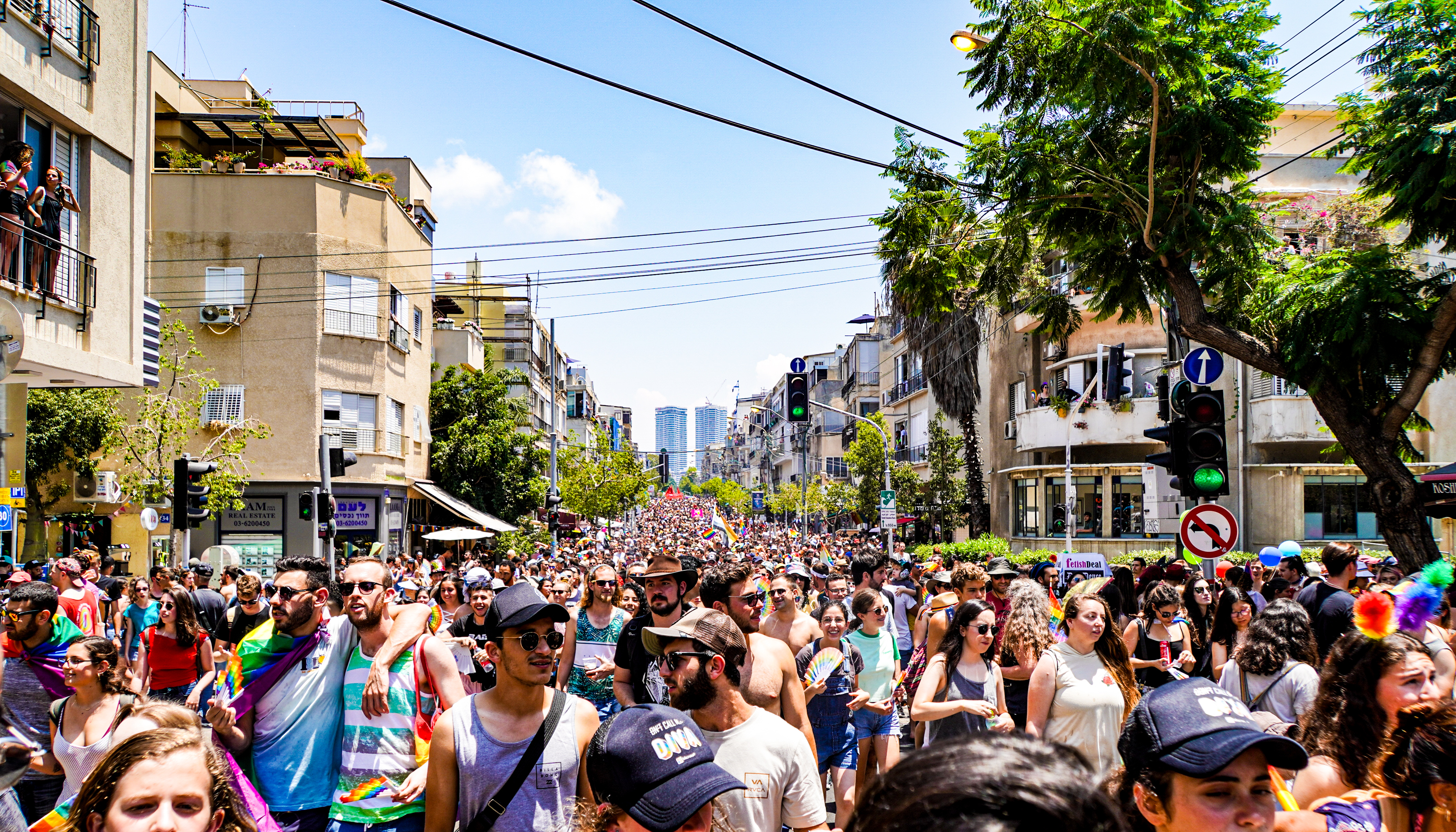
The 2019 Tel Aviv Pride parade attracted an estimated 250,000 attendees.

Israel has an active LGBTQ community, with well attended annual pride festivals, held in Tel Aviv and Jerusalem since 1998. Pride events are also held regularly in Haifa, Petah Tikva, Hadera, Ra'anana, Eilat, and Rishon LeZion. In 2016, the first-ever pride parade scheduled in Beersheba was cancelled by the Israeli Supreme Court due to security concerns, however in 2017 the first Beersheba Pride Parade was held with full council support. Israel is one of only eleven foreign countries to have a chapter of the U.S. group PFLAG, called Tehila.

The Jerusalem parade gained international coverage when three marchers were stabbed in 2005. The perpetrator was subsequently sentenced to twelve years in prison. An attempt by Jerusalem's mayor, a Haredi Jew, to thwart Jerusalem Pride in June 2005 had been challenged in the courts. The mayor lost and was ordered to contribute funds to the event. The WorldPride Festival was planned for Jerusalem in August 2005, despite protests and opposition from members of the three major religions in Jerusalem. However, it was postponed due to Israel's pullout from the Gaza Strip, which required the presence of most Israeli police forces and would thus leave the parade with little to no security. The parade had been plagued with threats of violence, as well as consistent grandstanding by some Jewish, Muslim and Christian leaders and members of the Knesset. In November 2006, more than two thousand members of the Haredi community jammed into streets in an Orthodox neighbourhood in a show of force aimed at pressuring authorities into cancelling the gay pride parade to be held in Jerusalem. About a dozen people were reported injured. Six people were stabbed in 2015. One of the victims, 16-year-old Shira Banki, died of her wounds at the Hadassah Medical Center three days later, on 2 August 2015. The number of Jerusalem pride participants after the 2015 attack was smaller than in years past. In 2016, some 25,000 took part, many in solidarity with the LGBTQ community following the deadly stabbing attack, while in 2017, at least 22,000 marched in the parade. In 2018, at least 20,000 marched in the parade. On 6 June 2019, around 15,000 people marched at the event, under tight security with a reported 2,500 security personnel. At least 49 people who wanted to violently disturb the event were arrested.

Tel Aviv Pride is one of the largest pride parades in the world. There were 200,000 participants reported in 2016. The parade is the biggest pride celebration in continental Asia, drawing more than 200,000 people in 2017, approximately 30,000 of them tourists. There were more than 250,000 participants reported in 2018, and again more than 250,000 participants in 2019.

On 1 August 2009, an unknown assailant opened fire at Tel Aviv's main LGBTQ youth center, the Barnoar, killing two and injuring fifteen others. The attack sent shockwaves throughout the worldwide gay community and throughout Israel, sparking an immense reaction throughout the country. Before this attack, it had only been mainly left-leaning politicians that supported the LGBTQ community in Israel. The issue for LGBTQ rights and acceptance began to slowly shift towards the center of Israel's political spectrum. This shift had slowly begun when Israel's Foreign Minister Tzipi Livni appeared at pride events in the months prior to the shooting. However, in the aftermath of this massacre, right-wing politicians began to publicly show their support for the LGBTQ community.

On 6 October 2016, Finance Minister Moshe Kahlon announced that the Israel Government had issued an order to give a divided 10 million shekels to various governments over a two-year period to examine the nation's LGBTQ community for possible discriminations. A leading LGBTQ nonprofit called the move historic and Haaretz journalist Ilan Lior noted that it would even result in a major examination of issues such as the MSM blood transfusion restrictions.

In February 2019, in a report to President Reuven Rivlin by the LGBTQ association The Aguda – Israel's LGBT Task Force, it was revealed that in 2018 there had been a 54% increase in homophobic incidents compared to 2017. The report highlighted that an anti-gay incident takes place about every ten hours on average in Israel. On social networks, a homophobic comment is detected every four minutes.

In July 2019, Shlomo Amar, the Sephardic Chief Rabbi of Jerusalem, was criticised for stating that gay people cannot be religious by saying that "They aren't religious. It would be better if they cast off their kippah and Shabbat [observance] and show their true faces.", and advocating for the pseudoscientific practice of conversion therapy. Ne'emanei Torah Va'Avodah and the Anti-Defamation League (ADL) criticised his comments. Jerusalem councilmembers Yossi Chavilov and Laura Warton called for the removal of Amar from his post as rabbi, as did openly gay politician Avi Buskila and Blue and White MK Eitan Ginzburg. Fellow Blue and White MK Yael German advised Amar to follow the example of Pope Francis in his moves to accept the LGBTQ community. The Jerusalem Open House association and three LGBTQ Jewish groups, Bat-Kol, Havruta and the Gay Religious Community, condemned his comments as well.

He also caused controversy in 2016 by saying that homosexuality is an "abomination cult" for which the Torah prescribes the death penalty.

In July 2019, a 16-year-old teenager who lives in the Beit Dror LGBT center in Tel Aviv was stabbed several times and seriously wounded by his brother for refusing to adopt "a religious lifestyle". Israel Gay Youth (IGY) called the stabbing a hate crime. The condition of the victim stabilized after he underwent surgery at the Tel Aviv Sourasky Medical Center. Media reported that the victim and two suspects were all Muslim brothers from the Arab town of Tamra in northern Israel and that the victim was removed from his home by social services due to harassment from his family. Nearly 1,000 LGBTQ people and allies marched in Tel Aviv under the banner "fighting for our lives" to denounce violence against LGBTQ people in the wake of the attack. The march was attended by openly gay Blue and White MKs Eitan Ginzburg and Idan Roll, who said the party was committed to ending violence against the LGBTQ community, and by Meretz leader Nitzan Horowitz, Israel's first ever openly gay party leader, and Etai Pinkas-Arad, who holds the LGBTQ portfolio at the Tel Aviv-Yafo Municipality. The stabbing was also condemned as a hate crime by a number of politicians, among them Nitzan Horowitz and by some Arab lawmakers, namely Meretz MK Issawi Frej, Hadash party leader Ayman Odeh, Hadash MK Aida Touma-Sliman and Balad MK Mtanes Shihadeh. Green Movement MK Stav Shaffir blamed members of the religious right for intolerance towards LGBTQ Israelis, to which Transport Minister Bezalel Smotrich (The Jewish Home) called her "stupid". Four days later, the two suspects in the stabbing turned themselves in.

In 2019, the LGBTQ association The Aguda – Israel's LGBT Task Force announced that gay pride events would be held in 12 locales that have never held them before. Among these are Tiberias, Beit Shemesh, Zikhron Ya'akov, Ramat Gan, Petah Tikva, Pardes Hanna-Karkur, Netanya, Yavne and Kiryat Bialik.

=== Health ===
On 23 February 2016, the Ministry of Health approved a pre-exposure prophylaxis (PrEP) program to prevent HIV transmission, making Israel one of the first countries to implement it. The drugs are handed out at AIDS centers in hospitals and clinics that serve the LGBTQ community, in addition to health fund clinics.

=== Public opinion ===
A 2013 public opinion poll by Haaretz showed support for same-sex marriage at 59% among Israelis. A Hiddush survey made in 2016 found that 76% of Israelis supported the recognition of same-sex marriage or civil unions. The poll showed an increase in public support on this issue in Israel. A June 2017 poll found that 79% of Israelis supported legally recognizing same-sex unions.

According to a 2018 European Social Survey, when compared to 17 European countries Israel had the highest percentage of people who feel their group suffers discrimination based on sexual orientation. Israel ranked 15th in support for the freedom of gays and lesbians to live their lives as they choose. The survey highlighted a connection between greater religiosity and less tolerance, while the link between political opinions and support for LGBTQ equality weakens.

According to 2020 Pew Research, 47% of Israelis said homosexuality should be accepted by society. Acceptance was higher among Israeli Jews (53%) than Israeli Muslims (17%).

According to a 2023 Pew research poll, 36% of the Israeli adults supported same-sex marriage with 56% opposed to it. The support was higher among Jewish adults (41%) than compared to Muslim adults (8%). Among Israeli Jews, support was higher amongst Hiloni ("secular") Jews (three-quarters) compared with 29% of Masorti ("traditional") Jews and 4% of Haredi ("ultra-Orthodox") or Dati ("religious").

In a further 2023 poll conducted by Israeli TV Channel 13, 61% of Israelis supported LGBTQ equal rights, with 52% expressing support for same-sex marriage.

In 2026, a study conducted by the Israel Institute for Gender and LGBT Studies found that 74% of Israeli Jews support full equality for LGBT people. When asked about specific rights, 67% supported the recognition of LGBT parenting, and 64% supported civil marriage for LGBT people. Politically, support was high across the spectrum: 76% of Likud voters manifested their full support for LGBT equality, while the opposition expressed 90% of support. By religious observance, support for equality was 89% among the secular, 75% among the traditional, 53% among the religious, and 25% among the ultra-Orthodox.

=== LGBTQ rights movement ===
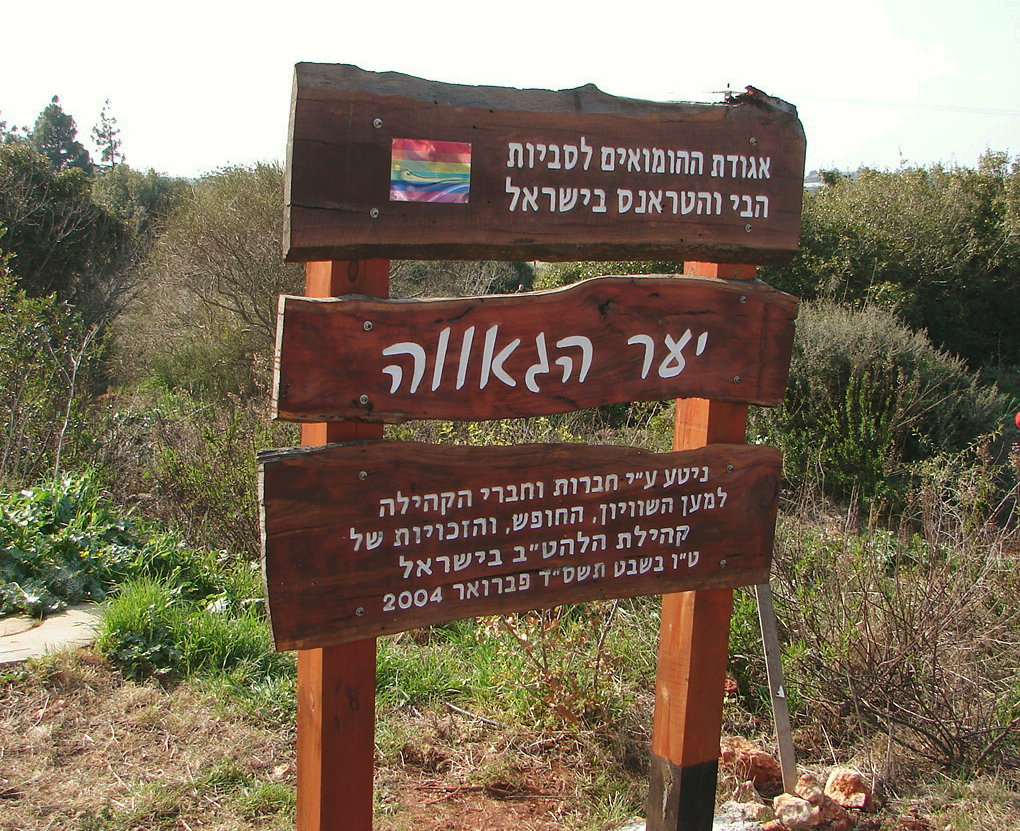
A sign at Ya'ar HaGa'ava ("Pride Forest") in the Upper Galilee, dedicated to Israel's LGBTQ community

Since the 1970s, there has been an active LGBTQ rights movement that has often affiliated itself with the Israeli feminist movement and various liberal and social democratic political parties. The oldest Israeli LGBTQ organization is The Aguda, founded in 1975.

=== Media ===
One of the first Israeli newspapers to cover the subject of gay people was a 1962 article in the now defunct HaOlam HaZeh. Taking a sensationalist tone, the newspaper warned of a "secret underground" movement within Israel.

In the 1980s, the Tel Aviv weekly newspaper HaIr began to publish a chronicle about an Israeli gay man, known at the time as Moshe, who would later reveal himself to be Gal Uchovsky. The second major shift in how Israeli media dealt with LGBTQ issues came in 1991, when the Histadrut Labor Federation began to include, in its official publication, a section on LGBTQ social and political topics. This was followed by gradually more supportive press coverage on the Israeli LGBTQ community and its human rights objectives. Today, the two Israeli daily newspapers have openly gay editors and/or writers, and several LGBTQ publications have come and gone.

Radio stations such as Radio Tzafon and Radio Radius both have scheduled times for guests to come on the air and talk about LGBTQ social and political topics.

=== Pinkwashing ===
Sarah Schulman, a writer and professor at the City University of New York, claims the Israeli government exploits its LGBTQ rights record to promote a public perception of Israel as a "modern democracy", a "safe and secure place for investment", and a "tourist destination with the sun and the sand". In August 2011, the Jerusalem Post reported that the Foreign Ministry was promoting "Gay Israel" as part of its campaigns to counter the negative stereotypes that many liberal Americans and Europeans have of Israel. Critics of Israel like Jasbir Puar, an associate professor of Women's and Gender Studies at Rutgers University, cite the Israeli Government's comparison of gay rights in Israel and in the occupied Palestinian territories as an example of pinkwashing. Citing WorldPride, which Jerusalem hosted in 2006, she wrote: "Within global gay and lesbian organising circuits, to be gay-friendly is to be modern, cosmopolitan, developed, first-world, global north, and, most significantly, democratic." Joseph Massad, associate professor of modern Arab politics and intellectual history at Columbia University, has written that the Israeli Government "insist[s] on advertising and exaggerating its recent record on LGBT rights ... to fend off international condemnation of its violations of the rights of the Palestinian people."

Ido Aharoni, former head of the Brand Israel project, responded to such criticism saying: "We are not trying to hide the conflict, but broaden the conversation. We want to create a sense of relevance with other communities." Alan Dershowitz, criminal and civil liberties lawyer, has said that the term "pinkwashing" is used against Israel by "some radical gay activists" who are anti-Semitic "bigots".

=== Film and television ===
The first Israeli LGBTQ-themed film came from openly gay director Amos Guttman and was called Nagu'a (English title Drifting). Guttman was its co-writer. The film follows a young Israeli gay man, living and working with his grandparents, who has dreams of making a film and finding true love. Guttman, who died of AIDS in 1993, would write and direct another Israeli gay-themed film titled Amazing Grace (1992). Both films are considered to be autobiographies of the director. In total, Guttman directed four films and three short films. His portrayal of Israeli gay men was dark, and his films are considered to be targeted at the LGBTQ community in Israel, and not to the general public.

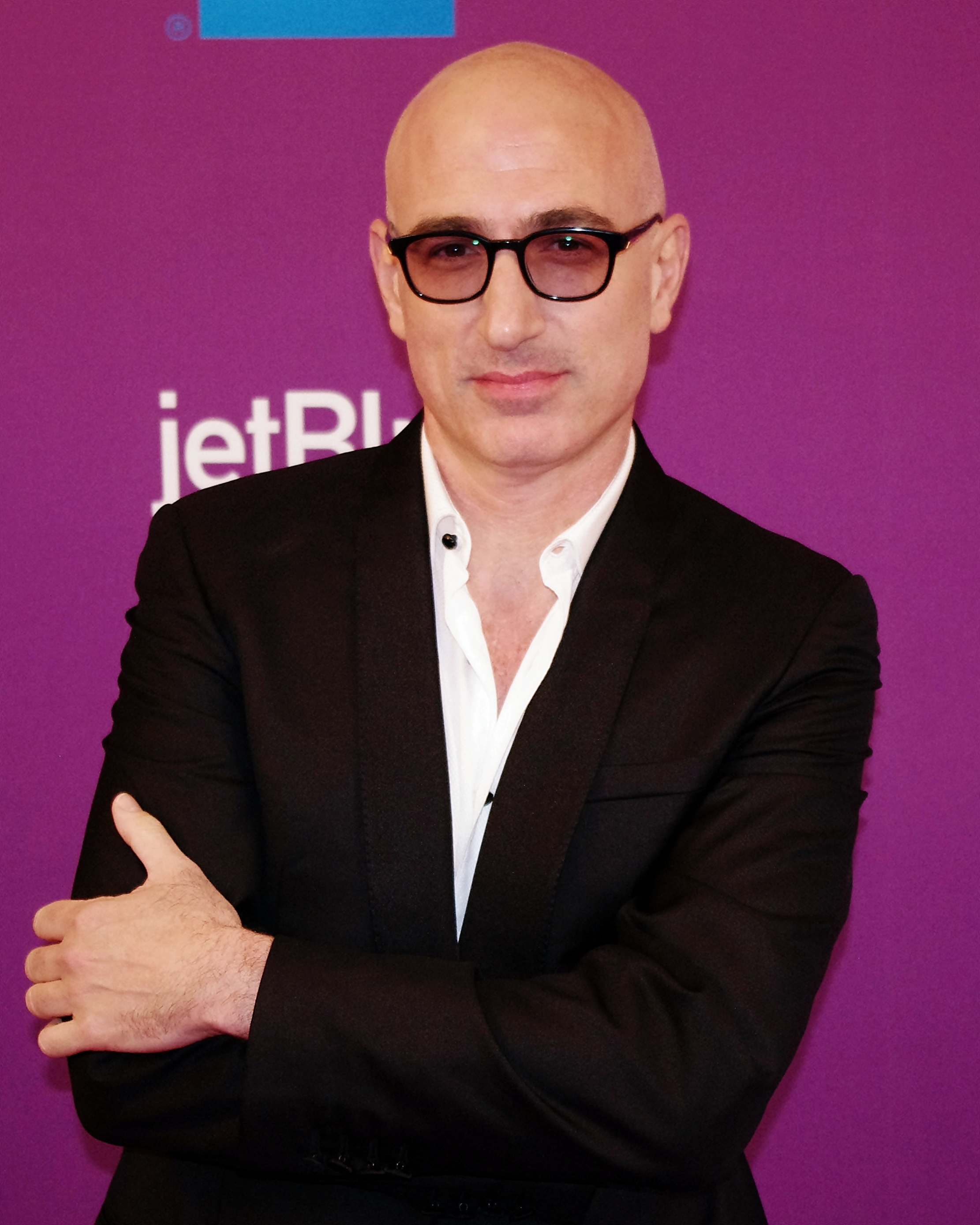
Israeli director Eytan Fox

Another notable Israeli director to tackle LGBTQ themes in films is Eytan Fox. His first film, Time Off (1990), was the second film made in Israel to focus on gay people. He has directed and written several other successful LGBTQ-themed films, including Ba'al Ba'al Lev (1997), Yossi & Jagger (2002), Walk on Water (2004), The Bubble (2006), Yossi (2012) and Sublet (2020).

Fox was also involved in the first Israeli prime time TV drama made for a general audience which dealt extensively with LGBTQ themes, Florentine (1997–2000). This was an Israeli television series about a group of post-military service, Israeli twenty-somethings living in Florentin. It was the first Israeli series to feature gay main characters, and was part of a slow trend that had been unfolding in the 1990s with shows such as Straight and to the Point and Siton. Florentine was also the first Israeli show in the country to broadcast a gay kiss. This was followed by the first-ever lesbian kiss on Israeli television between Shira (Ayelet Zurer) and Nicole (Ronit Elkabetz) in an episode broadcast in 2000.

Israeli film and television has also tackled the theme of homosexuality in the context of Orthodox Judaism. In Srugim (2008 - 2012), a television drama about Modern Orthodox characters in Jerusalem, Roi reveals to Reut that he is homosexual. Eyes Wide Open (2009) depicts a clandestine relationship in Jerusalem between two Haredi men played by Ran Danker and Zohar Strauss.

Out in the Dark (2012) was unique for depicting a gay relationship in the context of the Arab–Israeli conflict. It tells the story of a relationship that forms between Roy (Michael Aloni), an Israeli Jewish lawyer, and Nimer (Nicholas Jacob), a Palestinian psychology student from the West Bank.The Cakemaker (2017) was also a prominent addition to the canon of Israeli queer cinema.

Today, there is more programming for an LGBTQ audience. In 1993, the first commercial TV network in Israel, Channel 2, went on the air. It regularly dealt with LGBTQ social and political topics, and, in particular, helped generate greater visibility and acceptance of transgender celebrities such as Dana International. The LGBTQ community in Israel was also brought to the media's attention following the winning of the Eurovision Song Contest in 1998 by Dana International, an Israeli trans woman. At present, LGBTQ people in Israel can be seen on television in a variety of shows, mostly as hosts (such as Assi Azar), contestants in reality shows or characters on soap operas.

== Palestinian issues ==
Exact numbers of queer Palestinians living in Israel are disputed by pro-Israel and Palestinian queer solidarity activists. Some LGBTQ Palestinians have relocated to Israel, often fleeing harsh intolerance that includes physical abuse, death, or disowning. Significant expatriate groups exist in Tel Aviv and Netanya, where many live with their Israeli same-sex partners who help keep their presence in Israel hidden from the police (who would might be pursued for staying illegally in the country). Typically, pro-Israel commentators will not include the experiences of queer Palestinians in analyses of the living conditions for the LGBTQ community.

In other cases, some queer Palestinians who leave the Occupied Territories become undocumented workers in the Israeli sex market. Without legal protections, queer Palestinian sex workers can face discrimination, harassment, and sexual violence. Pinkwashing activists often use homophobic incidents in Palestine to minimize the experiences and justify such violent treatment of queer and trans Palestinians living in Israel. Law professors Michael Kagan and Anat Ben-Dor of Tel Aviv University wrote in a report that "Israel's continued refusal to consider asylum claims from gay Palestinians violates the general rule of international law---recognized by Israel's highest court---against returning a foreigner to a territory where his or her life may be in danger."

In 2003, Aswat was founded, which describes itself as a Palestinian lesbian support group in Haifa, geared toward Palestinian lesbians in Israel and the Palestinian Authority. An association of Aswat was founded in Ramallah in March 2007 by four gay students. The Israeli Jerusalem Open House has opened an Arab chapter called Al Qaws, reaching out to gay and lesbian Palestinians, Al Qaws later split off to become its own group in 2007. In 2008, Israel granted a gay Palestinian a residency permit to live with his Israeli partner in Tel Aviv following death threats from Palestinians regarding his homosexuality. Aswat said that some gay Palestinians have been targeted by the Israeli security services and told to collaborate with them or face blackmailing.

== Notable individuals ==
- Aderet, musician
- Corinne Allal, musician
- Sarit Hadad, musician
- Yossi Avni-Levy, diplomat
- Assi Azar, TV personality
- Orna Banai, actress
- Jean-Pierre Barda, musician and actor
- Eliad Cohen, model
- Evan Cohen, linguist and LGBTQ rights activist, foreign media spokesperson
- Dana International, musician
- Jonathan Danilowitz, activist
- Ran Danker, actor
- Jason Danino-Holt, anchor
- Irit Dinur, mathematician/computer scientist
- Uzi Even, scientist and politician
- Rose "Osang" Fostanes, musician
- Eytan Fox, film director
- Marcia Freedman, activist and politician
- Robert Friend, poet
- Shay Gabso, musician
- Amir Fryszer Guttman, musician
- Eitan Ginzburg, politician
- Amos Guttman, director
- Yuval Noah Harari, historian
- Matan Hodorov, journalist
- Noam Horev, song writer
- Nitzan Horowitz, politician
- Dario David Hunter, rabbi
- Rona Kenan, musician
- Yorai Lahav-Hertzanu, politician
- Asi Levi, actress
- Ivri Lider, musician
- Michael Lucas, film director
- Lyrik, musician
- Idan Matalon, video blogger
- Doron Medalie, musician
- Gili Mossinson, basketball player
- Ofer Nachshon, television and radio presenter
- Ezra Nawi, activist
- Adi Nes, photographer
- Offer Nissim, musician
- Tzipora Obziler, tennis player
- Amir Ohana, politician
- Dana Olmert, activist
- Yotam Ottolenghi, chef
- Etai Pinkas, activist
- Yehuda Poliker, musician
- Yehudit Ravitz, musician
- Idan Roll, politician
- Ronen Rubinstein, actor
- Jonathan Sagall, actor
- Itzik Shmuli, politician
- Gil Shohat, musician
- Dikla Hadar, actress
- Harel Skaat, musician
- Dori Spivak, judge
- Hovi Star, musician
- Gal Uchovsky, screenwriter and producer
- Yeho, musician
- Yona Wallach, poet
- Ron Yosef, activist
- Amit Rahav, actor
- Sapir Berman, soccer referee

== Summary table ==
Right	Status
Same-sex sexual activity legal	Yes (Since 1963 de facto, since 1988 de jure)
Equal age of consent	Yes
Anti-discrimination laws in employment	Yes (Since 1992)
Anti-discrimination laws in the provision of goods and services	Yes (Since 2000)
Anti-discrimination laws in all other areas (incl. indirect discrimination, hate speech)	Yes (Since 1997)
Anti-discrimination laws concerning gender identity	No
Same-sex marriage	No / Yes (Same-sex marriage from abroad recognised since 2006 and in a few cities since 2020)
Recognition of same-sex couples (e.g. unregistered cohabitation, life partnership)	Yes (Unregistered cohabitation since 1994)
Stepchild adoption by same-sex couples	Yes (Since 2005)
Joint adoption by same-sex couples	Yes (Since 2008)
LGBTQ people allowed to serve openly in the military	Yes (Since 1993)
Right to change legal gender	Yes
Access to IVF for lesbian couples and automatic parentage recognition on birth certificate of children from female same-sex couples	Yes (Since 2024, by the Israel Supreme Court)
Conversion therapy banned by law	Yes (Since 2022, only medical professionals are banned from performing conversion therapy)
Altruistic surrogacy for gay male couples	Yes (Since 2022)
Immigration equality and rights for LGBT individuals and same-sex couples	Yes (Since 2016)
MSMs allowed to donate blood	Yes (Since 2021)

== See also ==
- Tel Aviv gay centre shooting
- Homosexuality and Judaism
- Human rights in Israel
- LGBTQ history in Israel
- LGBTQ rights in the State of Palestine
- LGBTQ rights in the Middle East
- LGBTQ rights in Asia
- LGBTQ rights by country or territory
- List of LGBT Jews
- Men of Israel
- Tel Aviv LGBTQ Center
- Tel Aviv Pride
- Timeline of LGBT Jewish history
- LGBT clergy in Judaism
- Transgender people and religion
- Jewish LGBT organizations
- Pinkwashing (LGBTQ)
