= Hoshen (organization) =

Israeli LGBTQ organization

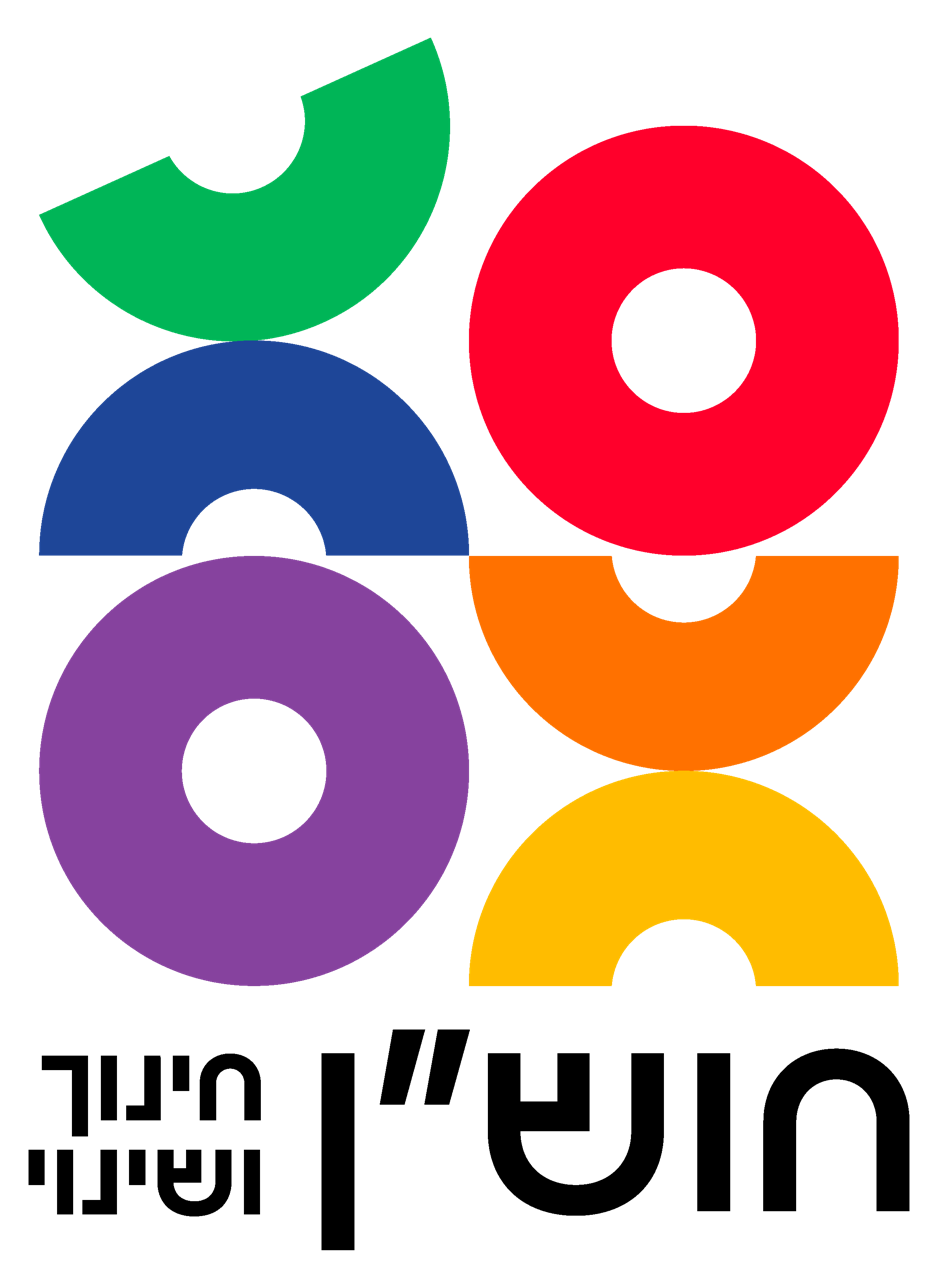
- Founded: 2001 (the NGO registered in 2004)
- Founder: Yoav Arad
- Type: LGBTQ organization
- Purpose: Education for acceptance of LGBTQ people
- Location: 18 Hatsfira st. Tel Aviv
- Region served: All over Israel
- Product: Education activities in high schools police army etc.
- Method: Various structured activities focused around communicating the experience of being LGBT
- Key people: Mor Nahari
- Employees: 15
- Volunteers: 250
- Website: http://www.hoshen.org

Hoshen (Hebrew: חושן Hoshen, lit. 'priestly breastplate') is an Israeli non-profit LGBTQ organization which is listed by the International Lesbian, Gay, Bisexual, Trans, and Intersex Association as the largest such organization in Israel. Hoshen is the Hebrew acronym for Education and Change.

== History ==
In 1976, Dr. Moshe Dov established The Aguda's Lecturing Service. In 2001, the organization was reformed into Hoshen, a non-profit volunteer organization whose purpose is to fight stereotypes regarding sexual orientation and gender identity. In July 2004 it became an independent public-benefit corporation. Hoshen is officially recognized by the Educational Psychological Authority of the Ministry of Education. Hoshen offers; educational activities, theoretical lectures, workshops, and seminars. The "Personal Story" is one of its primary educational activities, in which two LGBT individuals share their own personal story that helps the audience relate to them.

== Activities ==
=== Personal story ===
The organization's main educational activity is the Personal Story in which two LGBT individuals share their own personal stories. The volunteer's stories help the audience relate to them. Their personal stories also outline the difficulties they had to face and sometimes the price they had to pay.

=== LGBT civic studies program ===
After the Ministry of Education decided to reform the civic studies curriculum, the development team at Hoshen put together a program focused on high school students. The aim is to educate the students in regards to LGBT history and familiarize them with activists and the fight for civil rights equality. There are 33 meetings that make up the Civic Studies program and they are organized by Hoshen. The program also encourages mutual cooperation with other LGBT organizations; IGY (Israeli Gay Youth organization), Tehila (the Israeli “PFLAG”) and the LGBT Municipal Center in Tel Aviv.

=== The kindergarten teachers’ program ===
Due to more LGBT parents, a team composed of: psychologists, education councilors, kindergarten teachers and representatives of the education system developed a program that helps kindergarten teachers deal with children that are raised in LGBT families. The program was introduced in 2012 at the Oranim Academic College and the Kibbutzim College of Education, Technology & Arts as part of their curriculum. Hoshen also cooperates with Israel's popular TV children's channels.

=== Israeli Defense Forces ===
Hoshen works with diagnostics NCOs, squad leaders, mental health officers, and other activities that were asked for by the Ombudsman for soldiers in providing training courses for the IDF. Their activities in the arm services and those in the civilian sector are designed to create a more accepting environment through knowledge of LGBT history and personal acquaintance with people from the LGBT community.

=== Academic research ===
There is also an Academic Research Team that conducts studies and deals with LGBT related topics. In 2010, the team examined chronological milestones in the life of LGBT people:

- The age at which LGBT individuals discover their different sexual orientation.
- The processes they go through before coming out of the closet.
- The period in which they decide to hide their orientation.

== See also ==
- LGBT rights in Israel
- Lesbian and gay topics and Judaism
- Bat Kol (religious lesbian community in Israel)
- Israel Gay Youth
- Parents to LGBT people
