= Etai =

Etai or ETAI may refer to:

- Etai, one of the names of the oft-renamed Eagle (freighter)
- Electronic Transactions on Artificial Intelligence (ETAI), a scientific journal
- Ethyltrifluoromethylaminoindane (ETAI), a psychoactive drug and research chemical

== People ==
- Etai Pinkas (born 1973), Israeli LGBT leader
- Etai Yamada (1900–1999), head priest of the Japanese Tendai school of Mahayana Buddhism

== See also ==
- Itai, Hebrew given name
