= The Pride House in Beersheba =

LGBT organizations in Israel

Coordinates: 31°14′15.5″N 34°47′14.6″E

Pride House in Beersheba
- בית גאה בבאר שבע
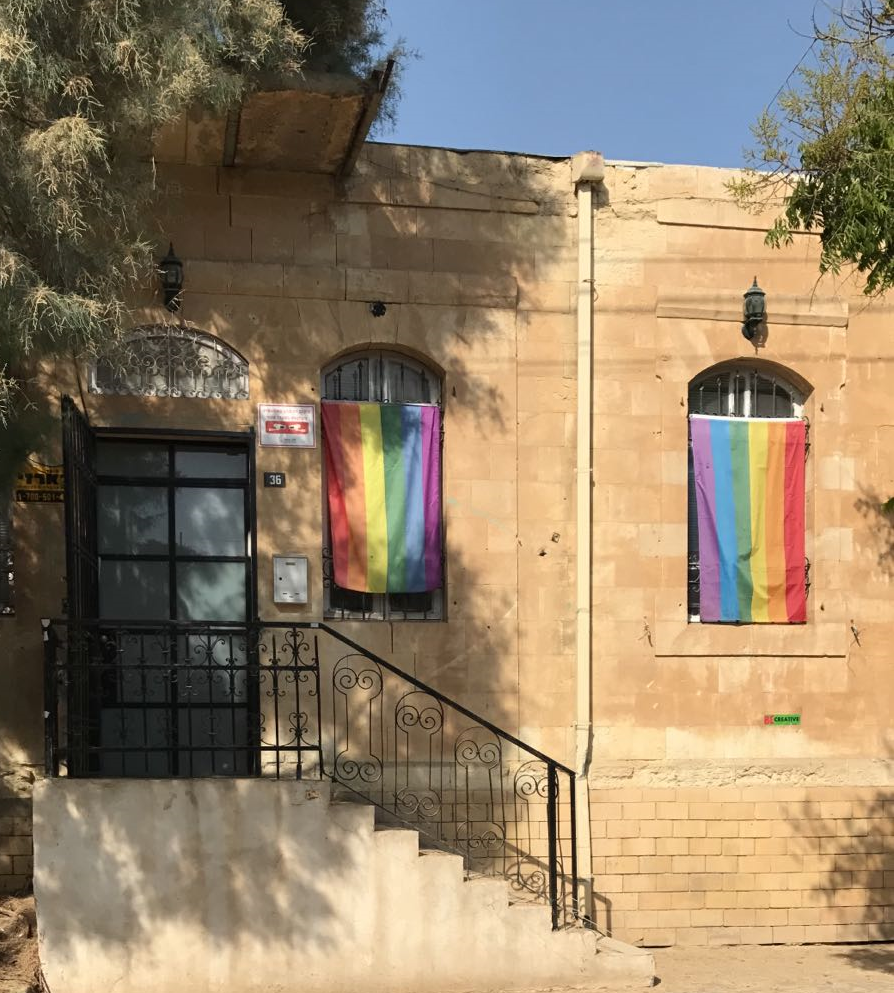
- The old Pride House in Beersheba (until 2017)
- Formation: 2000; 26 years ago
- Purpose: Promoting LGBT community in Beersheba and the Negev
- Official language: Hebrew

The Pride House in Beersheba is a local LGBT organization in Beersheba, Israel, that works for and promotes the LGBT community in Beersheba, the Negev, and the wider Israeli community. Pride House Beersheba organizes various social activities for the local LGBT community as well as Pride Parades, and has established itself as a prominent figure in Israel. The organization has been active since 2000 as a local branch of the Israeli LGBT association. However, in 2015, it separated from this organization and established itself as a separate local organization in its own right.

== History ==
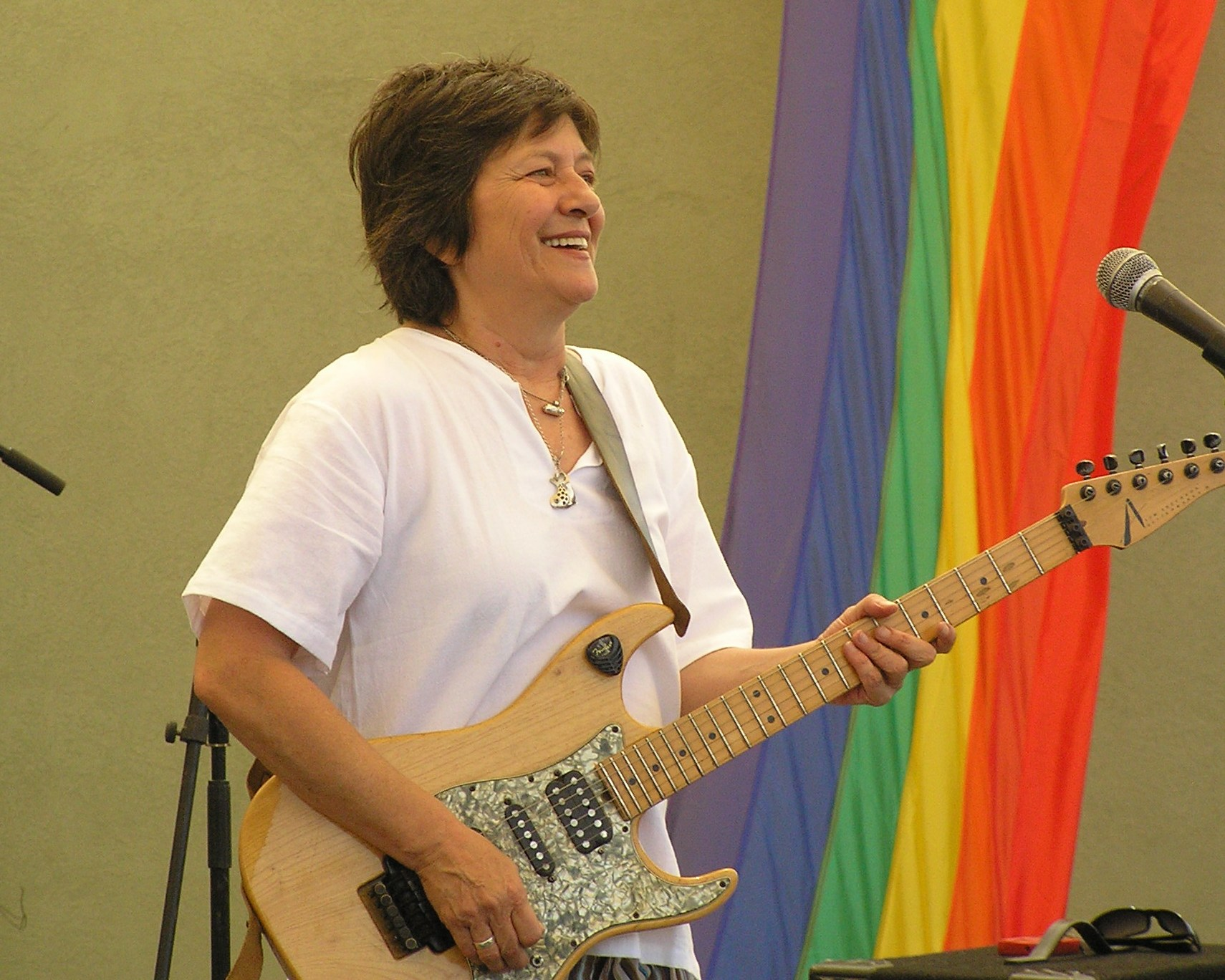
The Israeli singer Corinne Allal in the 1st pride event in Beersheba, 2010

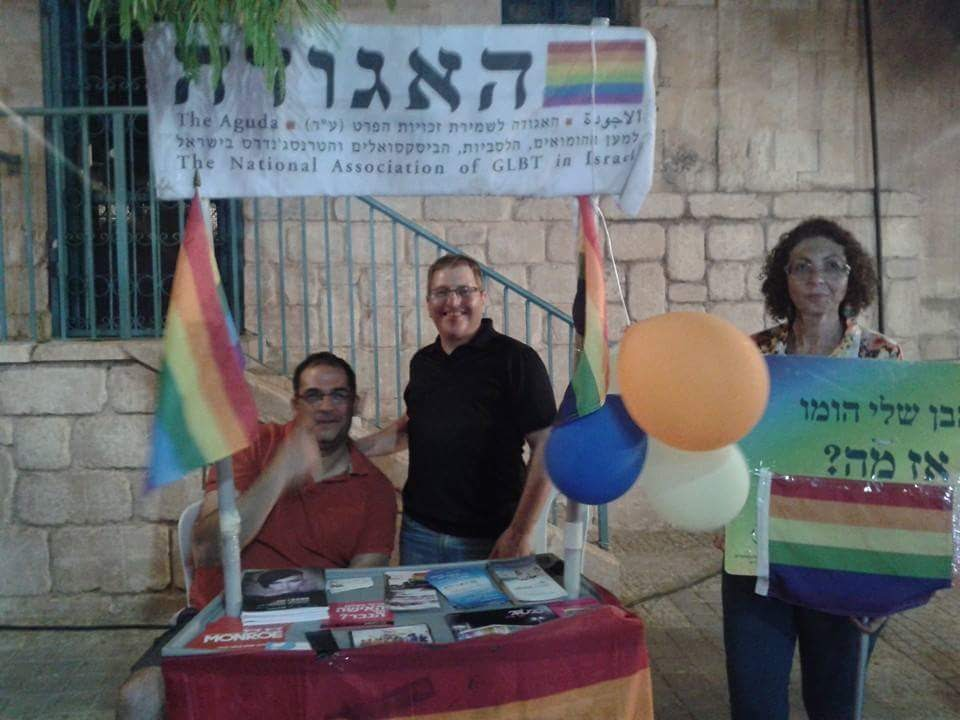
Pride House' s booths in Beersheba, with local activists, 2011

The Pride House in Beersheba was established as a local branch of the LGBT association in the end of 1999.

In 2016, the new organization "Pride House" submitted a request to hold an annual Pride Event and Parade. At first, the police gave permission to hold a parade, however due to various objections by Rabbi Yehuda Deri and religious representatives of the municipal council, this approval was withdrawn.

In light of the change in the municipality and the police's position, the Pride House in Beersheba, in cooperation with the Association for Civil Rights in Israel, appealed to the High Court of Justice of Israel, in Jerusalem. The High Court's decision barred participants from marching through the city’s main thoroughfare and offered an alternative route. In protest, Pride House Beersheba representatives refused and announced a demonstration in front of the Beersheba City Hall.

On June 22, 2017, a year after the largest gay demonstration in the history of the city of Beersheba, the Pride House organized the first LGBT Pride Parade in Beersheba with the participation of nearly 4,000 marchers. At the end of the parade there was a pride event organized by the Beersheba Municipality, in which the mayor, Ruvik Danilovich, delivered a speech. In his speech, the mayor asked the city's residents to show tolerance and acceptance of each other and stated "Beersheba belongs to everyone...This is a beautiful moment for the city."
After the parades of 2018 and 2019, and the interruption in 2020 because of the Covid-19 Pandemic, in June 2021, 2022, 2023, 2024 and July 2025 the 4th, 5th, 6th, 7th and 8th Pride Parades were organized by Pride House Beersheba and supported by the municipality.

In 2017 a decision was made by the local council to establish an urban LGBT community framework for the LGBT community in the city, as part of the communities' fabric, and to support the LGBT community. The municipality started to finance the community and began financing a designated social worker.

In March 2017, Beersheba city council announced it would provide a municipal building for the Pride House. That same year on November 30, the official launch of the new building inside Beersheba's Old City was celebrated.

In 2021, Beersheba LGBT activists rolled out the largest Pride flag in the Middle East. A 30 meter-long, nine-meter high flag was unveiled at the entrance to the capital of the Negev. CEO of Pride House Beersheba stated that the "LGBTQ+ community in the city of Beersheba has reached several records and the flag is another sign that the community in Beersheba is on the national map, if not the international one."

The Pride House hosts a variety of events, including an LGBT English Speaker Group, an evening with trans-biographies, meetings with youth groups to reduce prejudices, and an LGBT-Bet-Midrash-Group to read the Tanach under a queer viewpoint.
