= Jonathan Danilowitz =

Israeli activist (1945–2022)

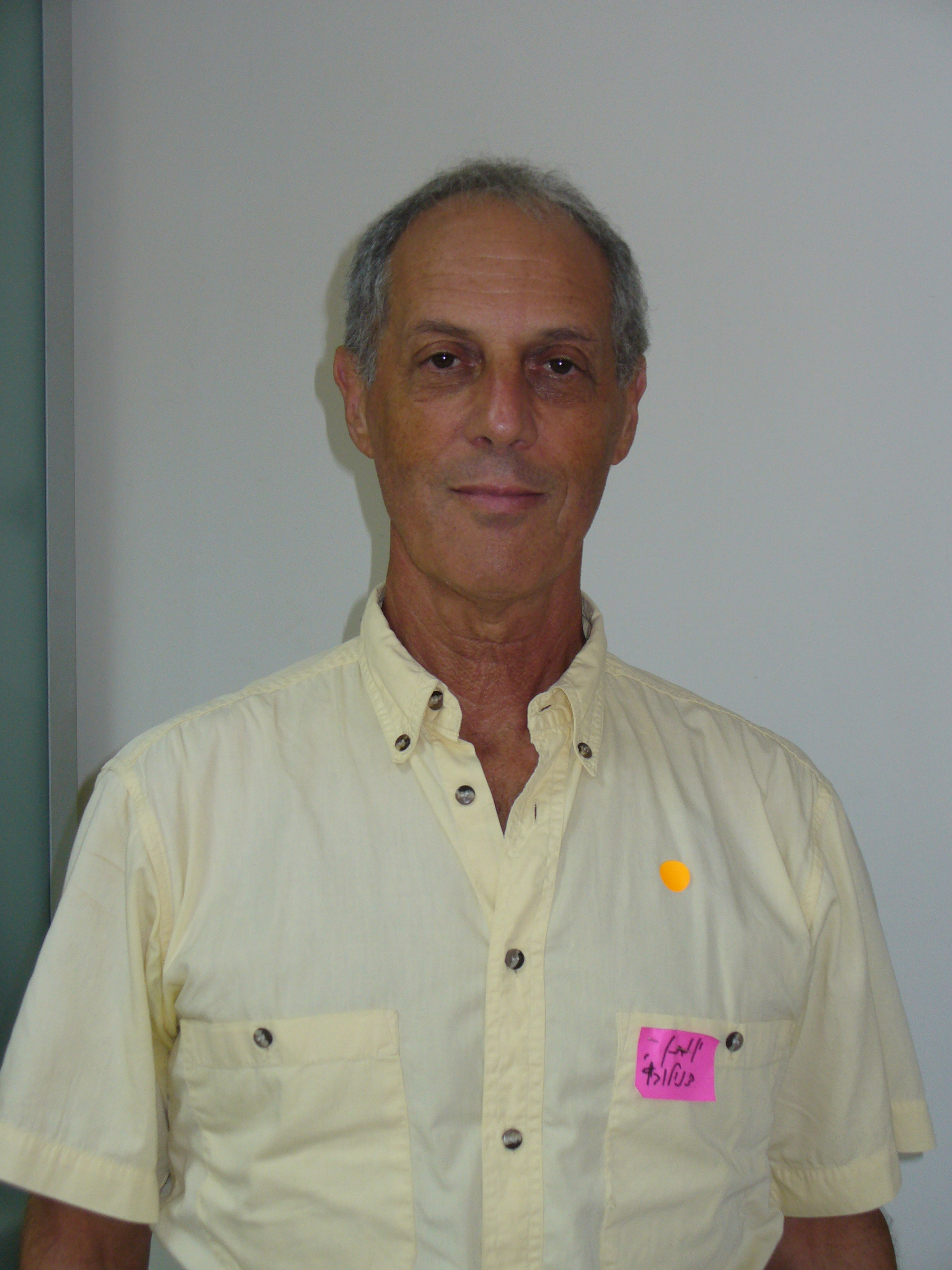
Danilowitz in 2009

Jonathan Danilowitz (Hebrew: יונתן דנילוביץ'; 13 January 1945 – 12 August 2022) was an LGBT activist and former chairman of The Aguda–Israel’s LGBT Task Force. In 2020, he was awarded Tel Aviv’s Yakir Ha’ir in recognition of his struggle for lesbian, gay, bisexual and transgender rights.

He was born and raised in Krugersdorp, South Africa, and immigrated to Israel in 1971. He worked as a senior in-flight service manager for El Al Israel Airlines, based in Tel Aviv.

He was the plaintiff in one of the most important lawsuits establishing equal rights for LGBT people in Israel. In 1989, he sued the airline in Tel Aviv Regional Labor Court after it refused to give to his longtime same-sex partner an airline ticket, stating common-law spouses had to be of the opposite sex.

It was one of the Israel's most publicized civil rights cases. In 1992, the National Labor Court ruled against El Al, determining the national airline’s discrimination against Danilowitz and his partner was illegal. The airline appealed to the Israeli Supreme Court. In 1995, the court concurred with the lower court, ruling the discrimination illegal and requiring the airline to grant partner benefits. The case is featured in the Museum of the Supreme Court in Jerusalem as one of Israel’s most important.

Danilowitz was 77 when he died on 12 August 2022 from pancreatic cancer.

== See also ==
- Tehila (organization)
- LGBT rights in Israel
