= Unregistered cohabitation in Israel =

Israel has granted unregistered cohabitation for same-sex couples since 1994, in the form of common-law marriage, a status that until then was only extended to opposite-sex couples. Following lawsuits, same-sex couples enjoy several spousal benefits (1994–1996) and the right of same-sex partners of civil service employees to survivor benefits (1998).

Insurance companies recognize same-sex partners in regard to deceased's ensured employment compensation benefits to surviving partner (1999). The National Insurance (Ha-Mossad le-Bitauach Leumi) Institute officially recognizes co-habitations and grants all pension rights, survivors and widows rights of the same sex partner of the deceased (2000), non-biological parents can register guardianship of their partner's child (2001); a January, 2005 supreme court ruling has made it possible for a partner to legally adopt a same-sex partner's biological child.

Foreign partners of Israeli LGBT citizens are generally entitled to receive residency permits. The Civil Service Commission grants spousal benefits and pensions to the partners of gay employees. The Israeli State Attorney's Office applies the spousal exemption from property-transfer taxes to same-sex couples. Israel's attorney general has granted legal recognition to same-sex couples in financial and other business matters. Attorney General Menachem Mazuz said the couples will be treated the same as common-law spouses, recognizing them as legal units for tax, real estate, and financial purposes. Mazuz made his decision by refusing to appeal a district court ruling in an inheritance case that recognized the legality of a same-sex union, his office said in a statement. Mazuz did differentiate, however, between recognizing same-sex unions for financial and practical purposes, as he did, and changing the law to officially sanction the unions, which would be a matter for parliament, according to the statement.

The city of Tel Aviv recognizes unmarried couples, including gays and lesbians, as family units and grants them discounts for municipal services. Under the bylaw, unmarried couples qualify for the same discounts on day care and the use of swimming pools, sports facilities, and other city-sponsored activities that married couples enjoy. In June 2020, it was reported that Tel Aviv will explicitly recognize both civil unions and same-sex marriage from outside Israel.

In 2017, the Florida Third District Court of Appeal held that although Israel recognizes "reputed spouses" as a legal union, the union is not a marriage under Israeli law, and therefore Florida law does not recognize the relationship as a marriage.

== See also ==
- Same-sex marriage in Israel
- LGBT rights in Israel
- LGBT rights by country or territory
- Recognition of same-sex unions in Asia
