= Etai Pinkas =

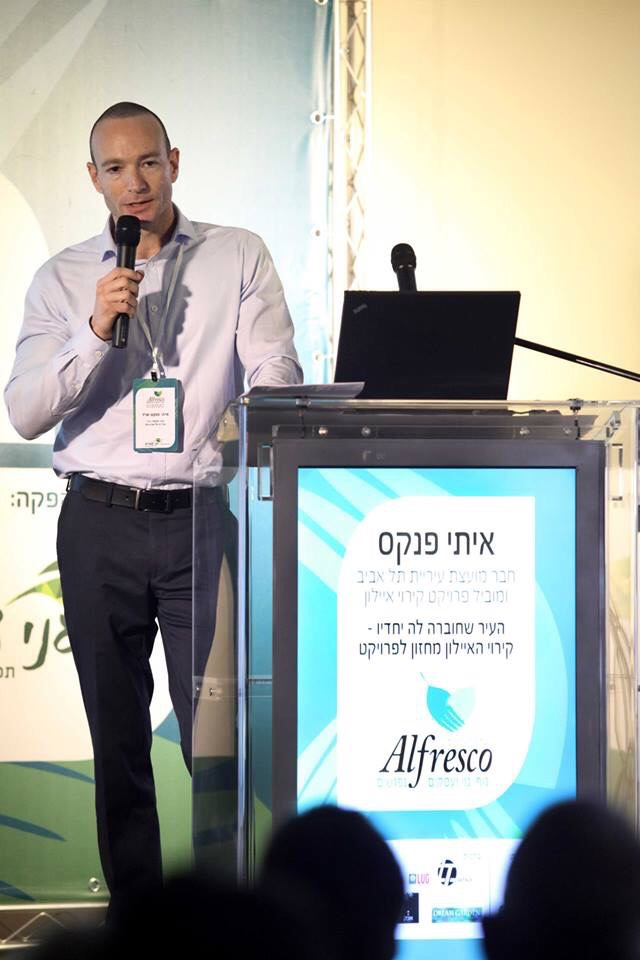
איתי פנקס מרצה

Etai J. Pinkas Arad (Hebrew: איתי פנקס ארד; born 1973) is a former leader of the Israeli LGBT community. Pinkas served as chairman of the national LGBT association in Israel and was a member of the Tel Aviv-Yafo City Council and advised the mayor on LGBT affairs.

Pinkas resigned from the Merez political party and his advisory role at the Tel Aviv Municipality in November 2021 following allegations that he forced himself upon a former partner and two teenagers, members of IGI, the Israeli gay youth organization.

== Biography ==
Etai Pinkas was born in Tel Aviv and grew up in Herzliya. He is a reserve army officer in the IDF holding the rank of a Major. He has an LL.B. in law from the Tel Aviv University Law School, as well as an MBA from the Herzliya Interdisciplinary Center, specializing in public policy. From 2000 to 2002, Pinkas served as chair of the national LGBT association. In 2005, Pinkas married his partner Yoav Arad as part of a public campaign to compel the state of Israel to recognize same-sex marriages. Their marriage was performed in Canada, the only country at that time which granted same-sex marriages to foreign citizens. Their request to have the marriage registered by the Interior Ministry was denied; however, at the end of 2006, the Supreme Court of Israel ruled the couple was, entitled to register their marriage in the Population Registry. In September 2010 the couple had twin girls, born via surrogacy in India.

On November 3, 2021, two people's claims were published, according to which when they were 17, they met Pinkas-Arad when he served as an instructor at Iggy - a proud youth organization, and he took advantage of his status and had sex with them without their consent. Following the publication of these claims, Pinkas-Arad stepped down from the position of holder of the LGBT portfolio in the Tel Aviv Municipality.

A week later, another testimony was published of a man who had a long sexual relationship with Pinkas and allegedly Pinkas raped him. Following this, Pinkas resigned from the Tel Aviv-Yafo City Council, deleted his Facebook account and resigned from the Meretz party. On November 12, 2021, the police officially opened an investigation, following the evidence against him.

== Public and political activism ==
From 2000 to 2002, Pinkas served as chair of the national LGBT association. However, prior to his becoming chairperson, the association was suffering an economic crisis. Under Pinkas' leadership, the LGBT association experienced the most rapid period of growth in its history: three new LGBT chapters were established in Beersheba, Kiryat Shmona and Eilat, while media visibility and community involvement increased considerably. He also played an integral role in acquiring the newspaper HaZman HaVarod (The Pink Times) for the association. Financially, Pinkas set up an internal system to recruit funding including an authorization for tax-free donations from both Israel and the United States. Through this process, Pinkas put the association on financially stable footing; it was able to pay off substantial amounts of debt.

His early stages in the Israeli political field were in the Likud Party. In 2003, Pinkas joined the Meretz party and was elected first in its primaries for the City's Council. In his first term as council member of the Tel Aviv-Yafo municipality he served as the mayor's first advisor for the LGBT community in the city. In this capacity, he secured an allocation of the municipal budget to establish a cultural center for the LGBT community. The center, located in Meir Garden, was officially launched as part of the 2008 Tel Aviv Pride festival. The LGBT center is the first in the world fully financed by the Tel Aviv municipality and operated by city employees. Pinkas today serves as the center's chairman.

In 2005, Pinkas married his partner Yoav Arad as part of a public campaign to compel the state of Israel to recognize same-sex marriages. Their marriage was performed in Canada, the only country at that time which granted same-sex marriages to foreign citizens. Their request to have the marriage registered by the Interior Ministry was denied. However, in the end of 2006, the Supreme Court of Israel ruled the couple was entitled to register their marriage in the Population Registry.

In 2006, Pinkas declared his support in the Labor Party's leader, Amir Peretz, and joined the party along with several other Meretz local leaders. "We are joining the Labor Party because of its social agenda. Labor's advancements in social and educational issues have proven that this is our natural place. Meretz is talking only about the Geneva Initiative." In 2013, Pinkas returned to the Meretz Party and was re-elected as a council member representing the party in the Tel Aviv-Yafo council. As a council member, he serves as the Chair of the city's tenders committee and responsible for the Operations Division (in charge of the local beaches, city control and sanitation). Pinkas also chairs the municipality's steering committee for the largest infrastructure and municipal project in the state of Israel, the Ayalon capping.

Since 2008, Pinaks holds board member position in public and private board of directors, including the Bat Yam Water Corporation, the Ayalon Highways company and the "Atarim" company.

In the 2013 elections Pinkas returned to the Meretz Party and was elected to the seventh place in the Meretz Tel Aviv Yafo Party running for city council. after the election, he served as the chair of the city's tender committee.

Pinkas served on Tel Aviv's city council until November 2021 when he left due to sexual assault and misconduct allegations.

== Personal life ==
In 2005, Pinkas married his partner Yoav Arad, the Chairperson of the Board of the "Hoshen" organization at the time. Their marriage was a part of a public campaign to compel the state of Israel to recognize same-sex marriages. Their marriage was performed in Canada, the only country at that time which granted same-sex marriages to foreign citizens. Their request to have the marriage registered by the Interior Ministry was denied; however, at the end of 2006, the Supreme Court of Israel ruled the couple was, entitled to register their marriage in the Population Registry. In 2010, Pinkas and his husband filed a precedential plea to the Israeli Supreme Court, asking it to obligate the Israeli Health Ministry to provide them surrogacy health services—the same services that all married couples in Israel are entitled to. As a result of the plea to the Supreme Court, the Israeli Health Ministry has assembled a professional committee, and in 2012 the committee published its recommendation to initiate a law reform that will allow gay couples to have children with surrogate women. The plea awaits a final decision by the president of the supreme court.

In September 2010, the couple had twin girls, born via surrogacy in India. In 2014, their third daughter was born via surrogacy in Thailand. Pinkas' mother, Shosh Pinkas, wrote an innovative children's book named – "Gal and Noa's dadys", describing the birth of children into same-sex couples, through the personal family story of Etai and Yoav. The book was translated into English.

== Awards ==
As chairman of the board for the Dan Region Association of Towns for Environmental Issues & Sewage, Haaretz magazine TheMarker named Pinkas one of the "100 most influential people in Israel" in its September 2006 issue. Under the category "Those Who Influence the Environment", TheMarker explained: "For more than two years, Pinkas has been head of one of the prominent public infrastructure bodies in Israel. In this period, he has promoted many projects that had been stalled for years: beginning to build the continental Sludge Treatment Factory of the Dan Region Association of Towns for Environmental Issues & Sewage and halting its emission into the Mediterranean Sea; progress toward establishing an Israel Sewage Expressway, progress on a sewage pipeline, upgrading the sewage infrastructures throughout The Gush Dan region, and adding new local authorities as clients to the company as Yehud, Beit Dagan, Lod etc."

In June 2008, Pinkas was awarded the highest accolade in Israel's environmental community—the "Green Globe"—for his work as chairperson of the Dan Region Association of Towns in transforming the association into a 100% recyclable organization. The "Green Globes" recognize the most significant pro-environmental advancement in Israel each year.

In June 2015, Pinkas was awarded a life-time achievement award by the Israeli LGBT association.
