= Dori Spivak =

Israeli attorney (born 1968)

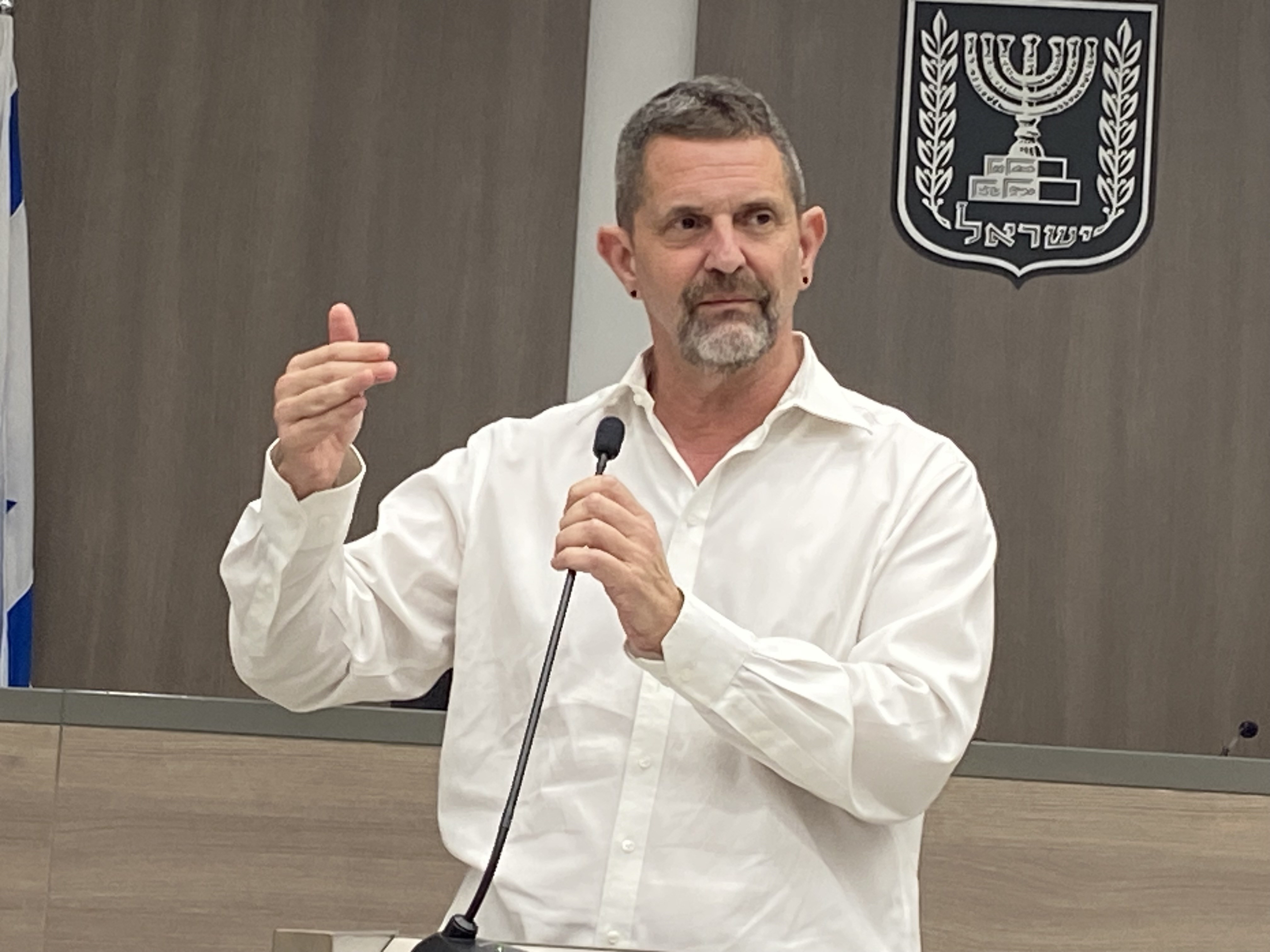
Dori Spivak

Dori Spivak (Hebrew: דורי ספיבק; born 19 December 1968) is an Israeli attorney. He is the first openly gay judge there. He was appointed to the Tel Aviv Labor Court on February 18, 2011.

== Early life ==
He was born in Israel and served in the military as part of a submarine unit. He earned a BA in Law and Economics, graduating cum laude from the University of Haifa, and a few years later went on to complete an MA in Law at Harvard University.

== Career ==
Prior to becoming a judge, he was an activist in the Israeli LGBT community. He served as the chairperson of the Association for Civil Rights in Israel, and the deputy director of Tel Aviv University Buchmann Faculty of Law's legal clinics, legal advisor to the Israeli Gay, Lesbian, Bisexual and Transgender Association and was involved with the Adva Center.
