= Tel Aviv Pride =

Annual LGBT pride parade in Israel

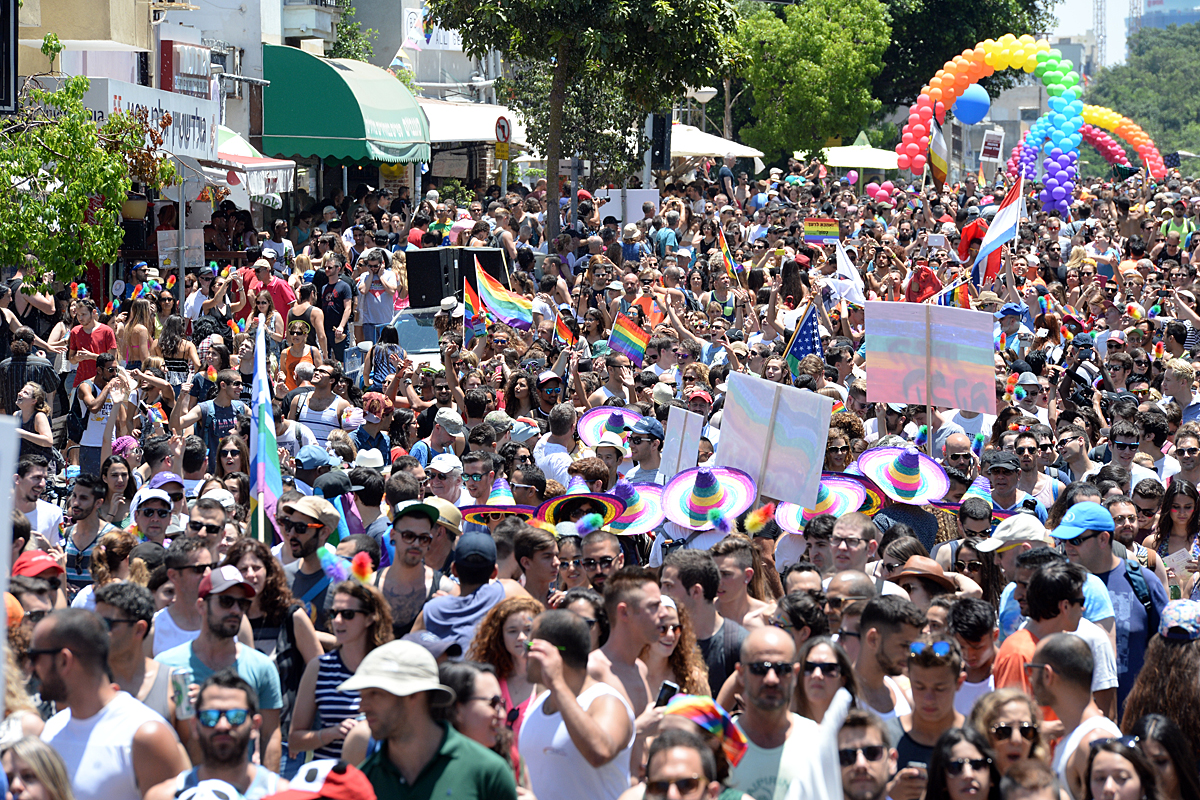
- Frequency: Annually
- Location: Tel Aviv
- Country: Israel
- Inaugurated: 1979
- Participants: More than 250,000 people (2019)

Tel Aviv Pride (Hebrew: מצעד הגאווה בתל אביב, Arabic: فخر تل أبيب) is a week-long series of events in Tel Aviv which takes place on the second week of June, as part of the international observance of LGBTQIA+ Pride Month. The key event, taking place on the Friday, is the Pride Parade itself which attracts over 250,000 attendees. As of June 2019, it is the largest LGBT Parade in Asia.

== Historical background ==
LGBT rights in Israel have progressed drastically since the years following the British Mandate of Palestine, during which homosexuality was outlawed. The clause stated that “every man who allowed another man to have intercourse with him risked up to ten years of imprisonment.” In the 1960s, the Israeli Minister of Internal Affairs, Dr. Yosef Burg, described the phrase of "homosexual Jews" as an oxymoron given the biblical rejection of queer behavior. This provides a framework for the negative perceptions of homosexuality amongst Israeli politicians in the past. The legal code in Israel that once outlawed homosexuality was changed on March 22, 1988, effectively decriminalizing being gay.

=== Pride Parade ===
The first event that many consider to be the first 'Pride' event to take place in Israel was a protest in 1979 at Kings of Israel Square. The first time that the Tel Aviv Pride Parade took place was in 1993.

The parade assembles and begins at Meir Park, then travels along Bugrashov Street, Ben Yehuda Street and Ben-Gurion Boulevard, and culminates in a party in Charles Clore Park on the seafront. There were 200,000 participants reported in 2016, making it one of the largest in the world. The parade is the biggest pride celebration in continental Asia, drawing more than 200,000 people in 2017, approximately 30,000 of them tourists. There were more than 250,000 participants reported in both 2018 and 2019. As of June 2019, it is the largest LGBTQ event in Asia and also the first city in Israel to host a Pride parade. More than 100,000 people participated in the 2026 parade, the first Tel Aviv Pride parade since 2023; the 2024 and 2025 parades had been cancelled amid the ongoing war and security concerns.

Smaller annual pride parades are also held in Jerusalem, Haifa and Be'er Sheva.

== As a part of Tel Aviv culture ==
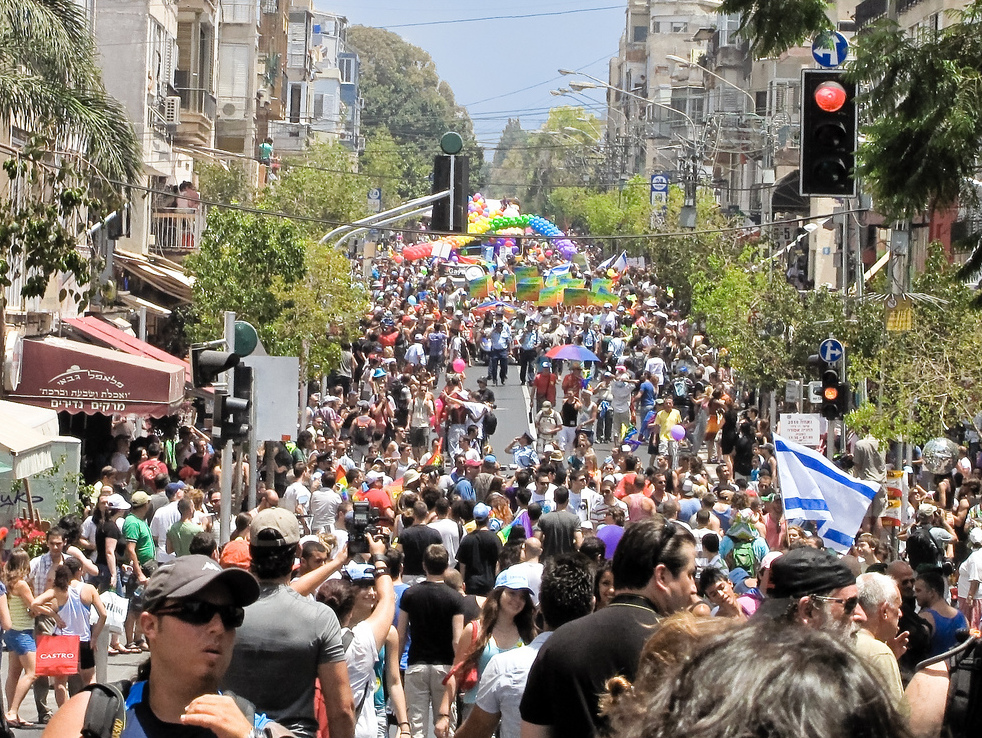
Tel Aviv Pride 2010

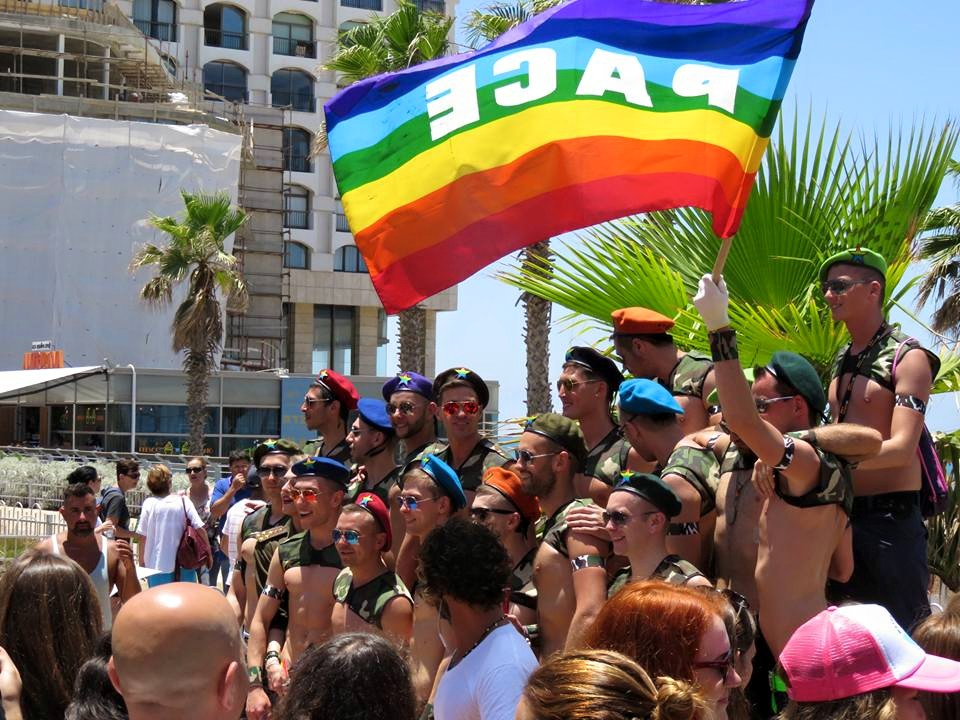
Tel Aviv Pride 2015. Bograshov St.

A 1979 protest at what is now Rabin Square is widely regarded as the first Pride event held in Israel. Later, in the early years from 1993 to 2000, the Tel Aviv Pride Parade was primarily a political demonstration. Later on, as the Parade grew, people who took part came with the notion that the Parade should focus on LGBTQ rights, equality and equal representation, and should not be used as a stage for radical politics, which are not accepted by most of the Parade's participants. Gradually, the Parade came to be less political due to the scale and diversity of participation. In recent years, the Parade's reputation for inclusiveness, along with Tel Aviv's world-class status as a gay-friendly destination and a top party city, has attracted more than 100,000 participants, many of them from around the world.

By 2000, the Parade had evolved from being a political demonstration and became more of a social-entertainment event and street celebration.

The eleventh Tel Aviv Pride Parade, which took place in 2008, was accompanied by the opening of the LGBT Centre in Tel Aviv. This is the first municipal gay centre in Israel, whose purpose is to provide services specifically for members of the city's LGBT community such as health care, cultural events, meetings of different LGBT groups, a coffee shop, and many others.

During the 2009 Pride Parade, which coincided with the centennial celebration of Tel Aviv's historic establishment as a city, five same-sex couples got married in what was called "the wedding of the century" by the Israeli celebrity Gal Uchovsky.

The parade on June 10, 2011 grew to an estimated 100,000 participants and included official representatives of LGBT groups from global companies such as Google and Microsoft. (Tel Aviv boasts one of the largest concentrations of hi-tech companies of any city in the world.)

In 2012, the parade attracted crowds exceeding 100,000, making it again the largest gay pride event in the Middle East and Asia. The event is advertised all around the world by the Israeli Tourism Ministry, marking the city of Tel Aviv as "the" premiere LGBT tourism destination.

For 2014, with an anticipated parade attendance of 150,000, a decision was made to move the after-parade beach party from Gordon Beach to Charles Clore Park. The event was hosted by Israeli actress/supermodel Moran Attias, with performances by Dana International, Mei Feingold, and Ninet.

In 2022 pride activists from the sustainability movement begin working on making the Middle East's largest pride parade more ecologically responsible.

During 2024, out of respect for the ongoing Gaza war hostage crisis, Tel Aviv cancelled its pride parade. The parade was once again canceled in 2025 amidst the June 2025 Iranian strikes against Israel.

On June 12, 2026, the parade returned for the first time since the October 7 attacks. The Israeli Ministry of Foreign Affairs reported that the 2026 parade had been attended by over 100,000 people. Police screening access to the area of the parade denied entry to some who were deemed to be in possession of "anti-government material", including one woman who was turned away for wearing a shirt criticizing National Security Minister Itamar Ben-Gvir.

== Criticism of the Parade ==
=== Pinkwashing ===
In Israel, LGBT activist groups have also criticized the Ministry of Tourism for disproportionately allocating funds to LGBT tourism as opposed to the real LGBT activist organizations. In 2016, the Ministry of Tourism spent $3 million on a campaign that concluded with a press release advertising a rainbow adorned airplane that the Ministry was going to use to transport gay bloggers and journalists to Israel. Meanwhile, Israeli LGBT organizations only receive one tenth of the amount budgeted for this advertisement on a yearly basis. This disproportionate spending angered leaders of the LGBT organizations and caused Chen Arieli and Imri Kalman, who were the co-chairs of The Aguda – Israel's LGBT Task Force, to threaten to cancel the parade, accusing the organizers of pinkwashing. The parade still took place that year, but the main outcome of this threat was that the Ministry of Tourism suspended its budget to attract gay tourism and added separate items to its budget for the LGBT organizations.

== Support for the Parade ==
Proponents of the Pride Parade argue that it is an effective mechanism of integrating the LGBTQIA community into Israeli society. While the parade could have resulted in increased homophobia and anti-gay sentiment, it has fostered positive intergroup relationships. The parade is also supported financially and logistically by the Tel Aviv City Hall. This was the outcome of consistent requests made by Aguda, Israel's LGBT Task Force, in the first five years of the parade's existence.

== See also ==
- LGBT rights in Israel
- LGBT history in Israel
- TLVFest LGBT Film Festival
- Jerusalem gay pride parade
- Haifa Pride
