= Uzi Even =

Israeli chemist and former politician (born 1940)

- עוזי אבן
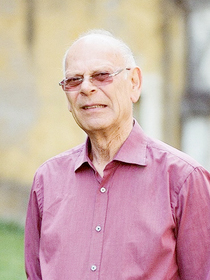

Faction represented in the Knesset
- 2002–2003: Meretz

Personal details
- Born: 18 October 1940 (age 85) Haifa, Mandatory Palestine

Uzi Even (Hebrew: עוזי אבן; born 18 October 1940) is an Israeli professor emeritus of physical chemistry at Tel Aviv University and a former politician well known for being the first openly gay member of the Knesset (the Israeli Parliament).

== Biography ==
Uzi Even was born in Haifa during the British Mandate era. He earned a BSc and MSc in physics at the Technion, and a PhD at Tel Aviv University. His specializations are spectroscopy of super cold molecules, molecular clusters and cluster impact chemistry, and the quantum properties of helium clusters. He then worked as a scientist at the Negev Nuclear Research Center near Dimona. As a reservist in the Israel Defense Forces he reached the rank of Lieutenant Colonel. He conducted top-secret military research and served as an intelligence officer during the Six-Day War and Yom Kippur War. In 1968 he left his job at the reactor and joined Lekem, an Israeli intelligence agency responsible for collecting scientific and technical information from abroad.

In May 1981, Even leaked the news of preparations to carry out "Operation Opera" to opposition leader Shimon Peres. Peres subsequently wrote a letter of protest to Prime Minister Menachem Begin, and the operation was delayed for a month.

In 1982, Even had his security clearance revoked and rank lowered in the IDF reserves and was reassigned to a clerical position after his sexual orientation was discovered. At the time, the IDF's policy prohibited known homosexuals from holding security clearances. In 1993, he participated in the first Knesset hearing on gays and lesbians, and spoke about his ordeal in the IDF over his sexual orientation. His testimony led to Yitzhak Rabin's government changing the law and regulations to allow homosexuals to serve in the army in any position, including one requiring a high security clearance. In 1996, after Even's employer, Tel Aviv University, refused his then-partner, Amit Kama, spousal rights equal to those it granted to the spouses of staff in heterosexual marriages, he sued the university with help from the Association for Civil Rights in Israel. Even won the case, setting a legal precedent.

In 2004, Even and Kama married in Canada. On 10 March 2009, the Family Court ruled that Even and Kama could legally adopt their 30-year-old foster son, Yossi Even-Kama, making them the first same-sex male couple in Israel whose right of adoption was legally acknowledged.

In December 2012 Even set yet another legal precedent by divorcing Kama. The divorce was granted by the Family Court, since the Rabbinical Court does not recognize same-sex marriages. This might lead the way for straight couples to bypass the religious establishment as well, which - in Israel - holds monopoly on marriage and divorce affairs.

== Political career ==
A member of Meretz, he narrowly missed out on being elected to the fifteenth Knesset in 1999, but as the next placed candidate on the party's list, he became an MK when Amnon Rubinstein resigned in 2002, making him the first openly homosexual member of the Knesset. For the 2003 elections he was placed 15th on the party's list, and lost his seat when they won only six seats.

In 2006, Even announced he was leaving Meretz and joining the Labor Party, feeling comfortable doing so after he noticed that Labor promised equality to all citizens in its election manifesto.
