= Evan Cohen =

South African-born Israeli linguist

Evan Gary Cohen (Hebrew: אוון כהן) is a South African-born Israeli linguist and a tenured professor of linguistics at Tel Aviv University. Cohen was the spokesman to international media for Israeli Prime Minister Benjamin Netanyahu from July 2019 to March 2020. Cohen succeeded David Keyes in the position.

Cohen's appointment was announced by Netanyahu on 14 July 2019. Cohen was not known to have any prior experience in public diplomacy. Several weeks before the announcement, Netanyahu saw Cohen being interviewed on the Israeli news channel i24 about Amir Ohana becoming the first gay Israeli cabinet minister and was impressed with Cohen's ability to present the Likud worldview.

== Political views ==
Before being appointed Netanyahu's spokesman, Cohen was the head of Likud Pride, the LGBT forum in the Likud party. In 2014, Cohen organized the Likud party's first international convention of LGBT activists in conservative parties. He has advocated for marriage equality and the right to surrogacy for gay men. In 2018, Cohen said the Netanyahu government's failure to include same-sex couples in a new surrogacy law was "shameful" and said that the bill should not have been passed.

Cohen said he believes gay people should support whichever party fits their political ideology regardless of their sexual orientation. Cohen said he identified "with the more hard right" in Israeli politics.

== Personal life ==
Cohen was born in Durban, South Africa. He moved to Israel when he was nine years old with his parents and three siblings. He was a captain in the intelligence branch of the Israel Defense Forces. He lives with his husband, Omri Rosenkrantz, in Ramat Gan. Cohen has a doctorate in linguistics from Tel Aviv University. His research focuses on phonology, phonetics and heritage linguistics.

Cohen is a competitive Scrabble player. He is the founder (1998) and director of the Tel Aviv Scrabble Club, and has been the highest-rated Israeli Scrabble player since 1991. Cohen has won several Israeli and international tournaments, and was the first player to represent Israel in the World Championships (1991), which he has done several times since.
