= The Aguda =

Israeli LGBTQ advocacy organization

The Aguda - The Association for LGBTQ Equality in Israel
- Founded: 1975, Tel Aviv, Israel
- Type: Non-profit NGO
- Purpose: LGBTQ rights in Israel
- Region served: Israel
- Affiliations: ILGA (suspended)
- Website: www.lgbt.org.il
- Formerly called: The Association for the Protection of Individual Rights (Hebrew: האגודה לשמירת זכויות הפרט); Israel's LGBT Task Force

The Aguda - The Association for LGBTQ Equality in Israel (Hebrew: האגודה למען הלהט"ב בישראל, HaAguda Lemaan HaLahatab BeYisrael), known commonly as The Aguda (Hebrew: האגודה, HaAguda, meaning "the association"), is an Israeli non-profit LGBT rights organization. Founded in 1975, the Aguda is based in Tel Aviv and focuses on volunteer-based initiatives and services for the LGBTQ community.

== History ==
The Aguda was founded in Tel Aviv on October 6, 1975 by a group of 11 gay men and one lesbian, including the well-known Israeli LGBT activists Yaakov Pazi, Dan Lachman, and Theo Mainz. Beginning in 1977 the Aguda operated out of the house of Jonathan Danilowitz. In its early years, the Aguda's main activities were organizing parties and social gatherings for the LGBT community.

In 1979, the Aguda hosted a gathering for Jewish LGBT organizations, organized by Danilowitz. Guests from other countries participated in this event which some consider the first Israeli pride parade, which was held in Tel Aviv at Kings of Israel Square (now known as Rabin Square). In the same year, Aguda activist Dan Lachman founded the "White Line" (Hebrew: הקו הלבן) telephone crisis hotline.

Over the years the Aguda was responsible for various cultural events for the LGBT community, The Aguda was the primary organizer of the Tel Aviv Pride Parade, from its beginning in 1993 through 2004. In the years 2005 and 2006 the Parade was organized jointly with the Tel Aviv-Yafo Municipality, and since 2007 it has been directed solely by the municipality. The Aguda also published the magazine Pink Time from 1996 to 2008.

In 1989 the Aguda began operating a political action program known as Otzma, directed by Marc Tenenbaum, Hadar Namir, and Joyce Sala. Through 1992 Otzma focused on fixing the Israeli equal labor opportunities law, believing it to be an achievable goal and due to Jonathan Danilowitz's ongoing suit against El Al for not giving equal benefits to his same-sex partner. Another reason for focussing on this law was that Ora Namir, the aunt of Hadar Namir, led the Knesset committee on labor and welfare. The alternative formulation of the law was suggested by the lawyer Dan Yakir of the Association for Civil Rights in Israel, who dealt with the issue of LGBT rights in the framework of his master's degree in the United States. In December 1992 the law was amended, and thus the Aguda achieved its first political breakthrough. In 1994 the Supreme Court of Israel relied on this law, when it ruled that El Al had illegally discriminated against Danilowitz, and recognized for the first time the rights of a same-sex couple.

The Aguda was also closely involved in various other political achievements for the Israeli LGBT community in the 1990s, including the 1992 establishment of a subcommittee for LGBT issues within the Committee for the Advancement of Women's Status in the Knesset, the 1993 change to the military's policy on enlistment to equalize the enlistment of gay and lesbian soldiers to those of other soldiers in the Israel Defense Forces, and the 1997 addition of degradation based on sexual orientation to the law prohibiting slander.

Since 2006, Israeli citizens who are exempt from military service in the Israel Defense Forces can volunteer in the Aguda as a form of national service.

In 2010 the Aguda received The Presidential Volunteer Medal, awarded by then-President Shimon Peres.

In October 2024, Aguda's membership in the International Lesbian, Gay, Bisexual, Trans and Intersex Association (ILGA) was suspended pending review after ILGA cancelled a bid from the group to hold an upcoming World Conference in Tel Aviv, following protests from South African delegates over human rights concerns. In May 2025, ILGA World announced lifting the suspension of the NGO on October 27, 2025.

== Social Services ==
Included in the Aguda's social services are the LGBT Hotline (Yesh Im Mi Ledaber Hebrew: יש עם מי לדבר, meaning There is Someone to Talk To), legal assistance, the Nir Katz center for reporting anti-LGBT violence, the LGBT clinic for psychological consultation, the LGBT Refugees project, the Pride Tag sign for businesses to indicate their support for the LGBT community, and its public policy forum.

== Previous names ==
The Aguda was founded with the name "The Association for the Protection of Individual Rights" (Hebrew: האגודה לשמירת זכויות הפרט), due to the fact that the Israeli Associations Register refused to accept the words "gay" or "lesbian" in an organization's name.

In 1988, following the repeal of anti-sodomy laws in Israel, the phrase "for Gays, Lesbians, and Bisexuals in Israel" was added to the name. In 1995, the operating name of the organization changed to "The Association of Gays, Lesbians, and Bisexuals in Israel", and the term "Transgender" was added to the name in 1999.

== See also ==
- LGBT rights in Israel
- Israel Gay Youth
- 2009 Tel Aviv gay centre shooting
- Jerusalem Open House
- Tehila
