= Yorai Lahav-Hertzanu =

Israeli politician

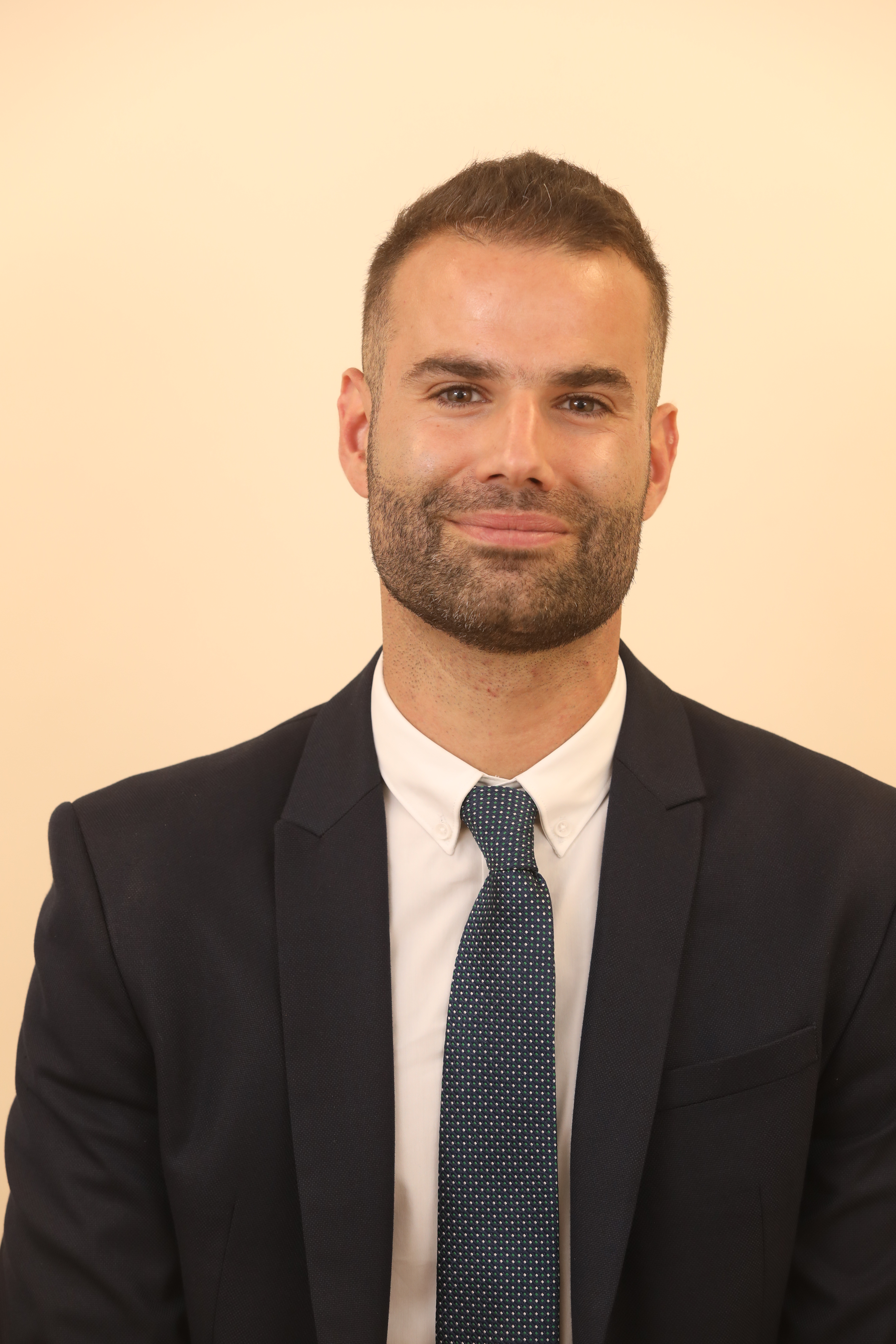
- Lahav-Hertzanu in 2019

Faction represented in the Knesset
- 2019: Blue and White
- 2020: Blue and White
- 2021–2026: Yesh Atid

Personal details
- Born: 5 August 1988 (age 38) Tel Aviv, Israel

Yorai Lahav-Hertzanu (Hebrew: יוֹרַאי לַהַב־הֵרְצָנוּ; born 5 August 1988) is an Israeli politician. He served as a member of the Knesset for Blue and White and Yesh Atid.

== Biography ==
Born in Tel Aviv, Lahav-Hertzanu was chair of the Tel Aviv-Yafo Student Council for three years whilst at school. He graduated from Tel Aviv University with an LLB and a BA in Middle Eastern and African history. He also gained an executive master's of law (ELLM) in public law from Tel Aviv University and Northwestern University. Although he received an exemption from national service for health reasons, he volunteered to serve in the Israel Defense Forces and spent six years in the army, the latter two as part of the IDF delegation to India, Nepal and Sri Lanka. He later became a blogger for The Times of Israel.

In 2013 he joined Yesh Atid and became head of the party's youth wing. He ran for election to Herzliya City Council on the party's list. Prior to the 2015 Knesset elections he was placed thirtieth on the party's list, but it won only eleven seats. He was moved up to fifteenth place on the party's list for the April 2019 elections, and when the party joined the Blue and White alliance, he was given the thirty-fifth slot on the joint list. He was elected to the Knesset as the alliance won 35 seats. Although he retained thirty-fifth place on the Blue and White list for the early elections in September 2019, the alliance was reduced to 33 seats, resulting in Lahav-Hertzanu losing his seat. However, he re-entered the Knesset in January 2020 as a replacement for Gadi Yevarkan. After being placed thirty-fifth on the party's list for the March 2020 elections, he lost his seat as Blue and White were reduced to 33 seats. However, he re-entered the Knesset again on 19 June 2020 as a replacement for Hili Tropper, who had resigned his seat under the Norwegian Law after being appointed to a cabinet ministry. Lahav-Hertzanu was placed fourteenth on the Yesh Atid list for the 2021 election and was re-elected as the party won 17 seats.

Lahav-Hertzanu is gay and lives with his partner in Herzliya.
