= Tehila (organization) =

- Founded: 1989, Tel Aviv, Israel
- Purpose: Support group, Advocacy, Campaigning
- Region served: Israel
- Website: www.tehila.org.il

Tehila (Hebrew: תהל"ה Tehila, lit.: "praise, adoration"; an acronym of: תמיכה להורים של לסביות, הומוסקסואלים, ביסקסואלים/יות, וטרנסג'נדרס, Temicha LeHorim Shel Lesbiyut Homoseksualim Biseksualim/iot VeTransjenders, lit.: "Support for the Parents of homosexuals, bisexuals, and transgender people") is a mutual support group in Israel for parents of LGBT people. The organizations activities include operating support groups, telephone help lines, and a website, as well as publishing and distributing supportive information.

The organization is based on the principles of and is very similar to the American organization PFLAG (Parents, Families and Friends of Lesbians and Gays).

Tehila was founded in 1989.
