= Marriage in Israel =

Legal status of marriages and divorces in the state of Israel

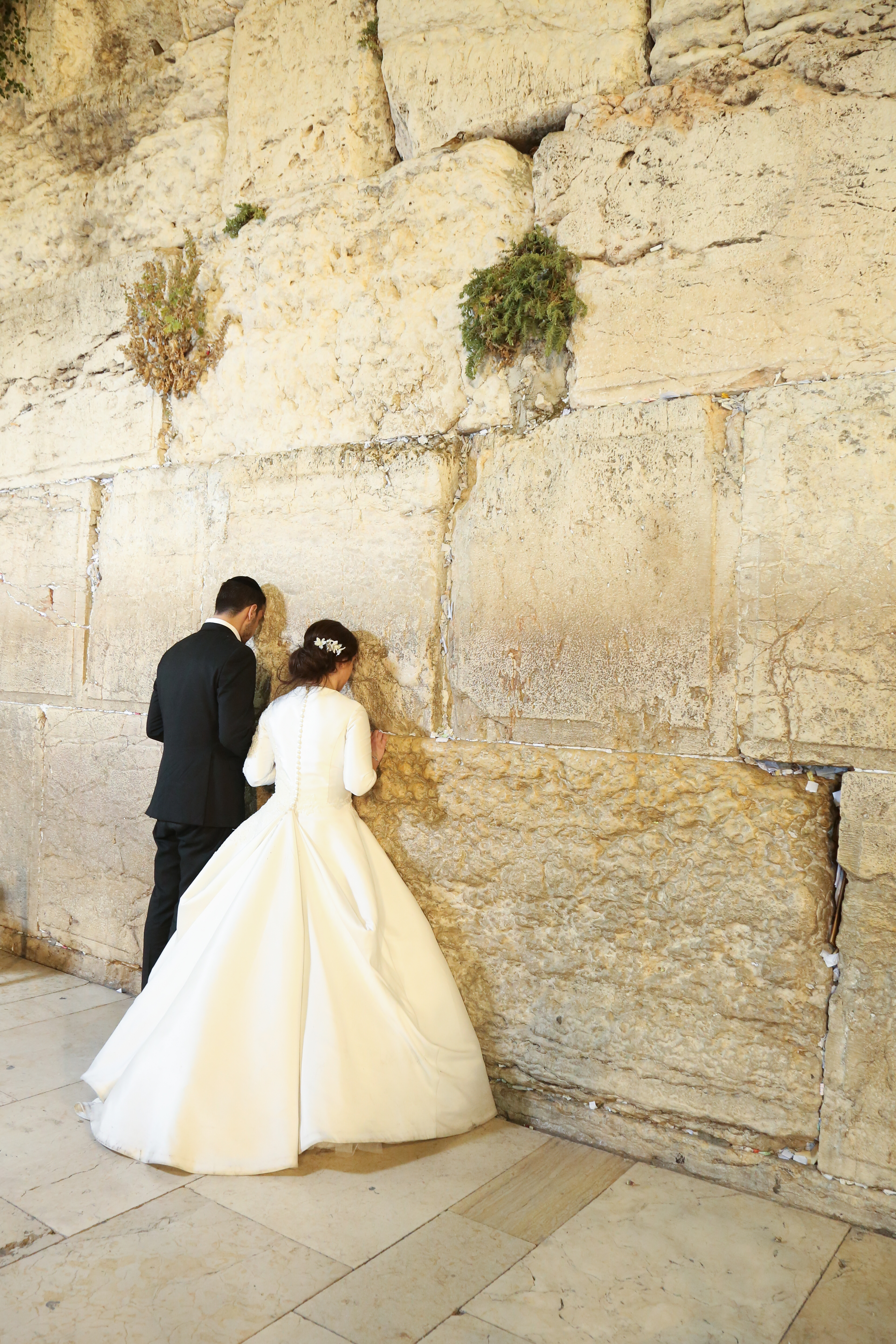
Bride and groom praying at the Western Wall before their wedding

In Israel, marriage can be performed only under the auspices of the religious community to which couples belong, and inter-faith marriages performed within the country are not legally recognized. However, marriages performed abroad or remotely via videoconference must be registered by the government. Matrimonial law is based on the millet or confessional community system which had been employed in the Ottoman Empire, including what is now Israel, was not modified during the British Mandate of the region, and remains in force in the State of Israel.

Israel recognizes only marriages under the faiths of Jewish, Muslim, and Druze communities, and ten specified denominations of Christianity. Marriages in each community are under the jurisdiction of their own religious authorities. The religious authority for Jewish marriages performed in Israel is the Chief Rabbinate of Israel and the Rabbinical courts. The Israeli Interior Ministry registers marriages on presentation of the required documentation. Israel's religious authorities — the only entities authorized to perform weddings in Israel — are not permitted to marry couples where both partners do not have the same religion or if they have the same sex; the only way for people of different (or no) faith to marry is by converting to the same religion. However, civil, interfaith, and same-sex marriages entered into abroad are recognized by the state; as a consequence Israeli residents not permitted to marry in Israel sometimes marry overseas, often in nearby Cyprus, or since 2022, remotely via videotelephony with an officiant in Utah, which a lower court and subsequently the Supreme Court de facto recognized in 2023.

As of 2018 over 50 percent of Israelis married before age 25, with marriage rates much higher among Orthodox Jews and Muslims than among secular Jews. However, an average age at first marriage among all social groups was reported to be 30.6 for men and 28.2 for women.

== History ==
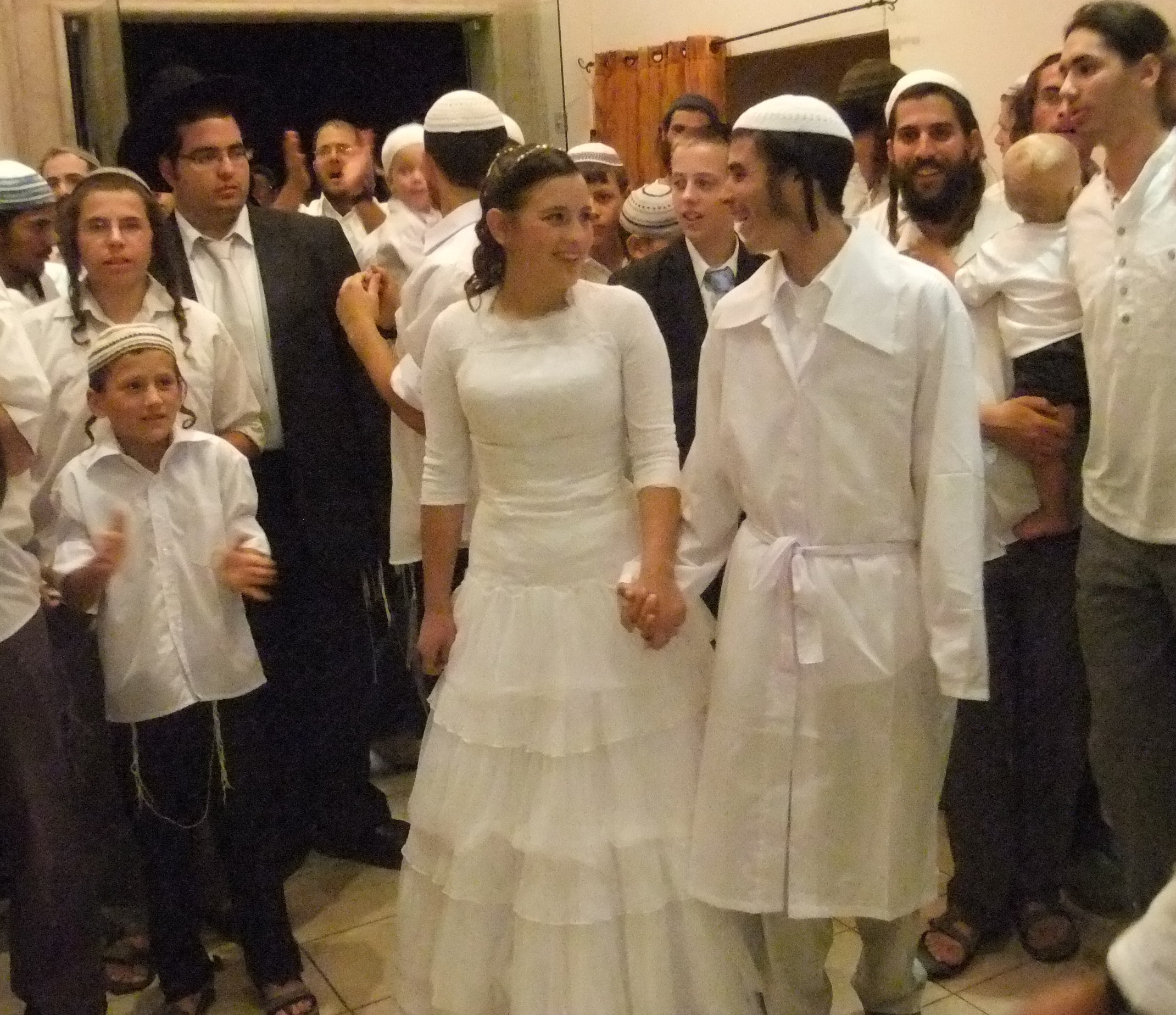
Jewish wedding in Jerusalem, 2011

Under the Ottoman Empire which controlled the territory that is now Israel, all matters of a religious nature and personal status, which included marriage, were within the jurisdiction of Muslim courts and the courts of other recognized religions, called confessional communities, under a system known as millet. Capitulation Treaties also permitted the registration of marriages and divorces in the British, German, American, and other consulates during the Ottoman period. Jewish religious matters were handled by the Hakham Bashi and the Jewish courts.

Article 14 of the British Mandate of Palestine, including the territory that is now Israel, required the mandatory administration to establish a commission to study, define, and determine the rights and claims relating to the different religious communities in Palestine. Article 15 required the mandatory administration to see to it that complete freedom of conscience and the free exercise of all forms of worship were permitted, but this was never put into effect. The High Commissioner established the Orthodox Rabbinate, and retained a modified millet system that recognized eleven religious communities: Sunni Islam, Orthodox Judaism, and nine Christian denominations. All those who were not members of these recognised communities were excluded from the millet arrangement, and marriages conducted in Palestine outside these communities were not recognised. Consular marriages remained customary during the British Mandate, and civil divorces granted in other countries were registered and recognized by the mandatory administration. Provision was made for the registration of marriages, but not for the manner in which marriages would be conducted.

=== Jewish community ===
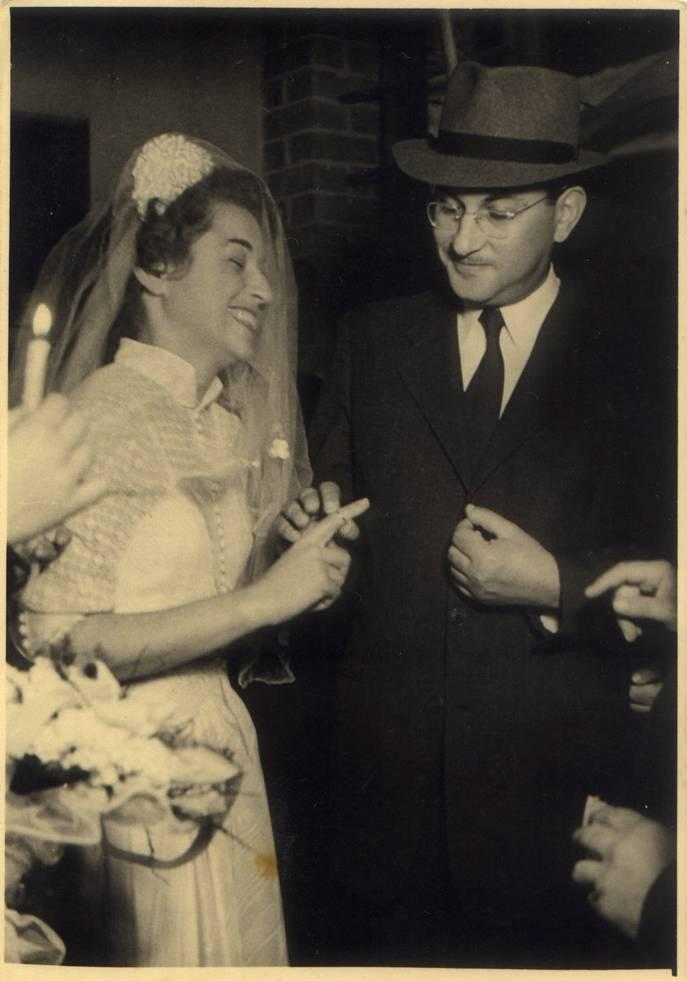
Jewish wedding in Israel, early 1950s

In 1947, David Ben-Gurion and the religious parties reached an agreement that included an understanding that matters of personal status in Israel, which included marriage, would continue to be determined by religious authorities. This arrangement has been termed the status quo agreement and has been maintained, despite numerous changes of government since. Under the arrangement, the Mandate period confessional system would continue, with membership in the Jewish community being on the basis of membership of a body called "Knesset Israel", which was a voluntary organization that managed registrations of people who were related to it — that is, those recognised as Jews. There does not seem to have been any dispute at the time of who was a Jew. However, in 1953 rabbinical courts were established under the jurisdiction of the Chief Rabbinate of Israel with jurisdiction over marriage and divorce for all Jews in Israel. The rabbinate's standards and interpretations in these matters are generally used by the Israeli Interior Ministry in registering marriages and divorces.

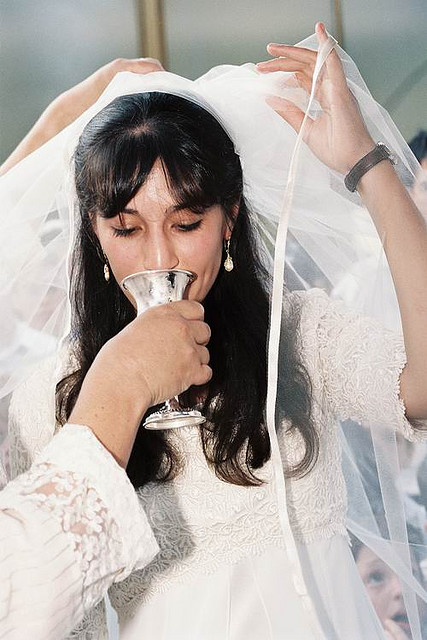
A sip of wine under the wedding canopy

Halakhic restrictions on marriage are applied in Israel. So, for example, a kohen may not marry a convert to Judaism. Similarly, children of adulterous and incestuous unions are restricted as to whom they can marry. Orthodox halachic rules apply to converts who want to marry in Israel. Under these rules, a conversion to Judaism must strictly follow halachic standards to be recognised as valid. Non-Orthodox conversions are not recognized, nor are some Orthodox conversions that do not meet the requirements of the Chief Rabbinate. For example, a man who converted to Orthodox Judaism in the United States was denied an official marriage in Israel because the Orthodox rabbi who converted him was not recognized in Israel. If a person's Jewish status is in doubt, formal conversion is required in order for them to be allowed to marry according to the Orthodox rules which govern all marriages between Jews in Israel. This frequently occurs with Jews from the former Soviet Union and Ethiopia.

In order to marry, Jewish couples must attend classes on family purity, even if they are not religious.

In October 2013, the Tzohar Law was passed, allowing Jews to choose to be married by any rabbi recognized by the Chief Rabbinate instead of only their community rabbi. In 2015, Tzohar (a religious Zionist rabbinic organization in Israel), along with the Israeli Bar Association, introduced a prenuptial agreement meant to help ensure divorcing wives will receive a get; under the agreement the husband commits to paying a large sum of money daily to his spouse in the event of a separation. It is a criminal offense for Israeli citizens to marry or divorce without informing the government about their marriage status change, which can result a sentence of up to two years In jail. Hiddush ranked Israel as the only Western democracy that is on a par with Islamic states including Iran, Pakistan, Afghanistan, and Saudi Arabia in relation to freedom of marriage.

In 2019, it was reported that there was a growing trend for Israeli couples to marry in Israel outside of the Rabbinate's jurisdiction. There was a consistent growth in the number of couples marrying outside of the Rabbinate, and a drop in the number of couples marrying within the Rabbinate. Marriages in Israel outside the auspices of the Israeli chief rabbinate will not be legally recognized by the state in Israel.

=== Muslim community ===
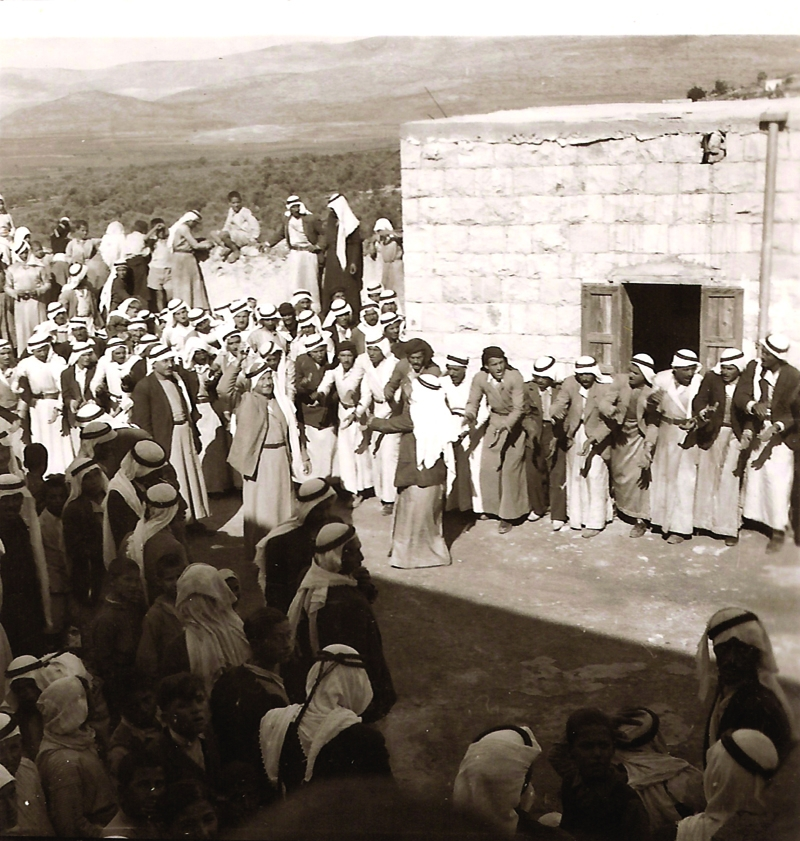
Two men dancing dabke at a village wedding, 1930s

Most Israeli Muslims are Sunnis. In 1922, the British created the Supreme Muslim Council as the Muslim religious authority in the British Mandate of Palestine and appointed Amin al-Husayni (1895–1974) as the Grand Mufti of Jerusalem. The council and the office of Mufti was abolished in 1948 by the Israeli authorities.

Muslim marriages are conducted in accordance with Islamic sharia law. Inter-faith marriages in Islam are permitted only between Muslim men and Christian or Jewish women.

A Muslim woman may petition for and receive a divorce through the sharia courts without her husband's consent under certain conditions, and a marriage contract may provide for other circumstances in which she may obtain a divorce without her husband's consent. A Muslim man may divorce his wife without her consent and without petitioning the court.

=== Christian churches ===
There are ten officially recognised churches for the purposes of marriage. These are the Greek Orthodox, Roman Catholic (Latin rite), Armenian Apostolic, Armenian Catholic, Syriac Catholic, Chaldean Catholic, Melkite Greek Catholic, Maronite Catholic, Syriac Orthodox and Anglican churches, Anglicanism having been included with the other recognised churches in 1970. At the same time, special arrangements for the recognition of marriage were made between the State of Israel and the Lutheran, Ethiopian Orthodox, and Coptic Orthodox churches. Christians may seek official separations or divorces, depending on the denomination, through ecclesiastical courts.

==== Protestants ====
For Protestant denominations other than the above-mentioned recognized Anglican, and Lutheran churches with special arrangements, marriages are considered on a case-by-case basis: the religious minister conducting the marriage ceremony writes a letter to the Ministry of Religious Services to request permission to perform the marriage and be granted a marriage certificate, stating the names, nationalities, and religious affiliation of the couple. It usually takes two to four weeks for these formalities to be completed before the marriage can take place.

=== Druze community ===
The Druze community was recognized as a separate community from the Muslim community in 1957. In 1962, separate Druze courts were established to deal with personal status issues in the Druze community, alongside the rabbinical courts, the Sharia courts, and the courts of the Christian communities.

== Civil regulations ==
In 2013, the general minimum age for marriage in Israel was raised to 18; it had earlier been 18 for men and 17 for women, then equalised at 17 years. Family courts are still able to recognise marriage for individuals above the age of consent (ie. Persons aged 16 years and above) in special cases.

The Israeli Supreme Court affirmed that marital rape is a crime in a 1980 decision, citing law based on the Talmud. Rape, including spousal rape, is now a felony in Israel, punishable by 16 years in prison.

Under the Penal Law Amendment (Bigamy) Law, 5719 (1959), it is illegal to marry in Israel while currently married, regardless of religion. Since 1977, attempting to take a second spouse can be punished by up to five years in jail, although the law is rarely enforced. Polygyny is nevertheless still practised by Muslim Negev Bedouins; according to a 2013 Knesset report, 30% of Negev Bedouin men have more than one wife. Some Bedouin men use nominal divorces or unrecognized marriages with women who are not Israeli citizens in order to circumvent the law. In 2017, Justice Minister Ayelet Shaked began a crackdown against the practice. Out of more than 300 cases investigated in 2018, 16 men were indicted for polygamy.

== Recognition of civil marriage ==
In 1951, the Supreme Court of Israel ruled that marriages entered into outside Israel conducted by a rabbinical court in accordance with halakha must be recognized in Israel. The issue of recognizing civil marriages is of special significance because Orthodox Judaism has various prohibitions involving marriages. The couples in these prohibited marriage situations sometimes marry overseas, mostly in Cyprus, which is near Israel.

In 1962, the Supreme Court determined that the Ministry of the Interior must register couples who married in a civil ceremony abroad, even if either or both of the couple were citizens of Israel. In 2006, the Supreme Court voted 6-1 to recognize same-sex marriages performed in other countries. Overseas marriages are increasingly popular; about 9,000 couples registered overseas marriages with the Central Bureau of Statistics in 2011.

In 2010, Israel passed the Civil Union Law for Citizens with no Religious Affiliation, 2010, allowing a couple to form a civil union in Israel if they are both registered as officially not belonging to any religion.

The issue of civil marriages is a major issue for secular and non-Orthodox Jews, as they are required to follow Orthodox practice to marry in Israel.

According to a 2016 Pew Research Center survey, more than 98% of Israelis are married to a partner of the same religion. 97% of Israeli Jews would be uncomfortable if their child married a Muslim and 89% would be uncomfortable if their child married a Christian. The vast majority of secular Israeli Jews oppose interfaith marriage.

In September 2022, an Israeli court in Lod recognized civil and religious marriages solemnized on Zoom videoconference by officiants in Utah as legal. The ruling was upheld by the Supreme Court of Israel on 7 March 2023, with the court siding against the Interior Ministry who appealed the lower court's ruling. The ruling allows for couples to not have to leave Israeli soil in order to receive solemnization of a civil marriage, but was opposed by religious parties in the Netanyahu cabinet.

== Divorce ==
The 1973 Spouses' Property Relations Act officially defined what assets would be divided after divorce or if one of the spouses dies, unless they both agreed beforehand. An amendment was later added to the 1973 law in 2008 to ensure that property would be divided equally among both spouses before the divorce rather than after.

The divorce process in Israel for married people of Jewish faith is administered by the Get Procedure and finalized by Rabbinical Judges. On 15 November 2016, the Get Procedure was officially regulated after State Attorney Shai Nitzan required criminal prosecution of men or women who refuse to grant or accept a divorce after being instructed to do so by a rabbinical court, although some said it would not have a dramatic impact since criminal proceedings will only be possible if the rabbinical court issues a rarely used ruling obligating a spouse to agree to the divorce. As of 2019, the number of Jewish divorces granted per year has been increasing; 11,145 couples divorced in 2018.

Israeli Jewish couples who marry in civil ceremonies outside Israel must divorce via the rabbinical courts. In 2018 the Knesset passed a law, slated to remain in effect for three years, allowing Israel’s rabbinical courts to handle certain cases of Jewish women wishing to divorce their Jewish husbands, even if neither spouse is an Israeli citizen. The judicial system can issue a stay of exit to a man undergoing a divorce if he neglects to fulfill his child support obligations.

Under the nation's Capacity and Guardianship Law, child custody is almost always granted to the mother following a divorce. In 2012, however, an amendment was added to the law to ensure that both the father and any child of the divorced parents who is at least six years of age would share equal rights as the mother as state-appointed social workers determine child custody. The age of the child with equal privilege was later lowered to two in 2013.

== See also ==
- Civil marriage
- Common-law marriage
- Interfaith marriage in Judaism
- Same-sex marriage in Israel
- Unregistered cohabitation in Israel
- Gett: The Trial of Viviane Amsalem
- Marriage in the Palestinian territories
