= Recognition of civil marriage in Israel =

Marriage in Israel is regulated by the religious courts of recognized confessional communities. However, civil marriages, including same-sex marriages, performed under foreign jurisdictions are recognized by Israeli law.

== History ==
In 1953, the Supreme Court of Israel ruled that marriages performed outside Israel conducted by a rabbinical court in accordance with halakha must be recognized in Israel. The case before the court involved a couple who were not residents or citizens of Israel at the time of their marriage. However, commentators have noted that the case did not deal with a situation where one or both of the couple were residents or citizens of Israel, nor with a civil marriage abroad.

The recognition of civil marriages is of special significance in Judaism because Orthodox Judaism has various prohibitions involving marriages. This includes, but is not limited to, restrictions on marriages involving a mamzer and by kohenim. Such marriages will not be sanctioned by religious authorities, and, as there is no form of civil marriage, cannot be formally entered into in Israel. The couples in these prohibited marriage situations sometimes marry overseas, mostly in Cyprus, which is near Israel.

In 1962, the Supreme Court determined that the Ministry of the Interior must register married couples who married in a civil marriage abroad, even if either or both of the couple were citizens of Israel. The act of registration is for statistical purposes only, and not a recognition of the personal status of the couple, as registration does not determine the validity of the marriage.

In 2006, the Supreme Court voted 6-1 to recognize same-sex marriages performed in other countries.

In a judgement given in November 2006, retired President of the Supreme Court Aharon Barak ruled that the recognition of a civil marriage entered into abroad extended to its validity and recognition as a marriage for the purpose of Israeli law, overruling a rabbinical court, which had determined that a religious court had the authority to decide the validity or otherwise of a civil marriage entered into abroad.

In 2010, Israel passed the Civil Union Law for Citizens with no Religious Affiliation, 2010, allowing a couple to form a civil union in Israel if they are both registered as officially not belonging to any religion.

In 2017, the Florida Third District Court of Appeal held that although Israel recognizes "reputed spouses" as a legal union, the union is not a marriage under Israeli law, and therefore, Florida law does not recognize the relationship as a marriage.

In September 2022, an Israeli court in Lod recognized civil and religious marriages solemnized on Zoom videoconference by officiants in Utah as legal. The ruling was upheld by the Supreme Court of Israel on 7 March 2023, with the court siding against the Interior Ministry who appealed the lower court's ruling.

== Statistics ==
In 2011, roughly 9,000 couples registered with the Central Bureau of Statistics that they were married overseas.

The CBS reported in 2019 that 1,151 same-sex couples had registered their foreign weddings in Israel since 2006. Male couples accounted for the majority of registrations at 61%. In 2022, the CBS identified 9,200 overseas weddings registered in Israel, about 40% of which were celebrated in 2022 alone.

By 2024, Hiddush estimated that over 3,000 couples in which at least one partner is Israeli had been married by Utah via teleconference, making up about 30 percent of the non-US citizens using the system.

== Arguments for and against ==
Since the establishment of the rabbinical courts, the status quo agreement has been strongly supported by the religious community, but criticized by others. The main argument of the supporters of the system is that a change of the status quo agreement will divide the Jewish people in Israel between those who marry according to Jewish religious standards and those who marry in a civil marriage. Civil marriages would not be registered or scrutinized by the rabbinate. In certain circumstances, such as when a woman who was previously married according to Jewish religious standards entered into a civil marriage without obtaining a religiously-valid divorce decree (get), the children produced by civil marriages could be considered illegitimate or mamzerim, which would prohibit them from marrying any Jew who was not also a mamzer. Opponents of the status quo agreement consider the system to be contrary to people's civil rights.

Although most of the debate relating to civil marriage in Israel is conducted in the Jewish community, the issue has the same implications for all other recognized religious communities in Israel.

=== Support for religious marriages ===
Supporters of the status quo agreement argue that:

- When people are married according to Jewish law and subsequently divorce civilly, children from a subsequent marriages of the woman will be mamzerim, who are severely limited by Jewish law in whom they can marry. This, together with acceptance of non-Orthodox conversions, will split the Jewish people into two groups that cannot marry one another.
- Marriages in the rabbinical court preserve the holiness of the state of Israel, and add a spiritual and religious dimension of family purity according to Jewish religious laws.
- Civil marriage will lead to assimilation and intermarriage. Marriage in the rabbinical court, it is argued, is a guarantee to the continuation of the existence of the Jewish population in the state of Israel.
- A secular legislator is incapable of understanding the importance of religious halakha standards to the religious community.
- From a religious standpoint, a religious ceremony causes no harm, even though it imposes halakhic standards on non-religious Israelis — it is even considered by the religious community to be a mitzvah, a noble deed.

=== Support for civil marriages ===
Supporters of civil marriage in Israel argue that the status quo agreement violates the rights of Israeli citizens by:

- imposing religious standards on those who do not desire it.
- creating difficulty for the marriages of people who belong to different religious communities and people who do not observe any religion.
- not permitting marriages of those who are prohibited by halakha, such as marriage between a person considered to be a mamzer, or a Cohen wishing to marry a divorcee. It also prohibits widows who did not have any children from a previous husband from getting remarried without passing halizah.
- restricting religious equality by refusing to delegate authority to Reform and Conservative communities.
- discriminating against women, by the inclusion of institutions such as Agunot and "recalcitrant wives", and by refusing to permit women to officiate as rabbis in the rabbinical court.

Supporters of civil marriage also argue that the status quo agreement is in breach of the Universal Declaration of Human Rights, Article 16, which states that "men and women of full age, without any limitation due to race, nationality or religion, have the right to marry and to found a family."

After Rabbi Dov Haiyun was arrested for performing an unsanctioned wedding, the director of Israeli civil rights organization Israel Hofsheet (Be Free Israel) called for the "immediate legislation of a civil marriage law".

== Arrangement attempts of the legal situation ==
=== The verdict ===
At the times when people petitioned the Supreme Court of Israel, trying to convince the Supreme Court to form an authority of civil marriages, the Supreme Court refused to do so, declaring that this was the responsibility of the Knesset. In cases when people requested to proclaim themselves as being "non-religious", in order that the court would be able to recognize his or her marriage according to an acceptable civil judgment, the court rejected their assertion. The only time in which the Court determined that the Ministry had to recognize a marriage between a Cohen and a divorcee was when it was based on the religious law that determines that those are forbidden marriages from the start but allowable post factum.

=== Alternative methods ===
Over time, a number of alternative methods have been used by couples who wished to marry without a religious ceremony, or who were unable to marry in Israel.

One method is to marry outside Israel; nearby Cyprus became the most convenient venue for many Israelis. Paraguay, which allows marriage without the presence of the couple to be arranged by the Paraguayan consulate in Tel Aviv, is another jurisdiction used.

Another approach is to resort to what is called a "common-law marriage". A common-law marriage entitles the partners to most of the rights of a formally married couple in relation to inheritance, pensions and the landlord and tenant matters. However, the status of common-law marriage is not equal to that of formal marriage in many fields. For example, exemption from military service for a married woman only applies to a formally married woman.

Jurist Frances Radi supports these attempts to "bypass the law in legal ways", but points out that the necessity of an Israeli to resort to the use of a foreign state in order to marry diminishes the value of the alternative ways to marry. In her view, "the existence of those minor alternatives only points out the lack of the respect to secular values that the Israeli judiciary demonstrates".

Others, such as Rabbi Chuck Davidson, conduct religious weddings outside of the framework of the state. Under Israeli law, Davidson can be jailed for up to two years, although this law has not yet been tested by the courts.

=== Political attempts to resolve the situation ===
In the late 1960s, the Independent Liberal party attempted to enable civil marriages for couples who could not marry in rabbinical courts; however, this attempt caused a governmental crisis.

The left-wing Meretz party, and its historical component parties Mapam, Ratz, and Shinui, have been trying to allow civil marriages in Israel for a long time, but without success. At the start of the 21st century, several rabbis (including the chief Sephardi rabbi of Israel, Shlomo Amar) said that the great alienation that this situation creates does not serve the religious interest. As part of the coalition agreement for Ariel Sharon's second government, the Shinui party demanded that a legal solution be found for those who could not marry within Israel. A committee formed to find a solution for this problem came up with the "coupling arrangement" solution (ברית הזוגיות). This committee, which was led by Israeli parliament members Roni Bar-On, Yuri Stern, Nissan Slomianski, and Roni Brizon, and represented parties from the wide political religious spectrum from the Shinui party to the Mafdal party, eventually submitted a bill by which there would be a separate status recognized for people who came in the pact of duality, which would not be considered as "marriage", but would be as similar as possible to the marriage institution. The bill never reached further legislation procedures.

In July 2007, Israel's Justice Minister Daniel Friedmann and the chief rabbi of Israel Shlomo Amar reached an agreement on a limited bill for civil marriages in Israel, which would apply only to the marriage of Israelis who do not belong to any recognized religious community. Such a bill was introduced by Yisrael Beiteinu in 2009, eventually passing the Knesset in May 2010; this bill, however, only grants "couplehood union" status to couples who both declared non-religious status.
