= Tsav =

Tsav or Tzav may refer to:

- Tsav, Armenia, a town
- Tzav, one of Judaism's Weekly Torah portions
- Tzav 9, an Israeli right-wing group
- Tzav ikuv, an Israeli court order
