= Recognition of same-sex unions in Israel =

Same-sex marriage is not performed in Israel. Marriage in Israel is regulated by the religious courts of fifteen recognized confessional communities, none of which perform interfaith or same-sex marriages. Domestic civil marriage is not recognized in Israel; however, civil marriages performed in foreign jurisdictions, including same-sex marriages, are recognized with almost all marital rights under Israeli law. In November 2006, the High Court of Justice ruled that same-sex marriages performed abroad may be registered in Israel. Consequently, Israeli same-sex couples who wished to have their marriages recognized by the government had to marry outside Israel, in a jurisdiction where such marriages were legal, and then register upon returning home. In July 2022, the Central District Court ruled further that marriages performed via an online civil marriage service established by the U.S. state of Utah, including same-sex marriages, are legal in Israel, removing the necessity of leaving the country to get married. The ruling was upheld by the Supreme Court in 2023. Polling suggests that a majority of Israelis support the legal recognition of same-sex unions, with a June 2019 opinion poll conducted by Hiddush showing that 78% of Israelis supported recognizing same-sex unions.

== Legal history ==
=== Background ===
The religious authority for Jewish marriages is the Chief Rabbinate of Israel, and there are parallel religious authorities for Christians, Muslims, and Druze, with a total of fifteen religious courts. These regulate marriages and divorces for their own communities. Currently, they all oppose same-sex marriages. If the views of one of these bodies were to change, however, it would be legal for members of that community to enter into religious same-sex marriages in Israel. Non-religious same-sex wedding ceremonies without legal significance are commonly conducted in Israel, most notably in Tel Aviv. The first unofficial municipal wedding took place in August 2009, following the Tel Aviv Pride Parade; five couples were married by Mayor Ron Huldai. The traditional verse for wedding ceremonies from Psalm 137, "If I forget thee, O Jerusalem, let my right hand wither...", was used, but replacing "Jerusalem" with "Tel Aviv". Later, 23 same-sex couples held an unofficial mass wedding ceremony in Tel Aviv on 4 June 2019.

Israel does not perform civil marriages. As a result, Israelis not affiliated with any religion, secular Jews not wishing to marry in the rabbinical courts, same-sex couples, and some Russian and Ethiopian Jews who cannot prove their Jewish heritage to the satisfaction of rabbinical authorities, cannot marry in the religious courts. Many couples travel to Cyprus to marry; however, same-sex marriage is not legal in Cyprus, and as a result same-sex couples often travel to Western Europe, Canada or the United States to marry. Despite this fact, unmarried same-sex and opposite-sex couples have equal access to many of the rights of married couples in the form of an "unregistered cohabitation" status (Hebrew: קוהביטציה שאינה רשומה, kohabitatzyah she'einah reshumah, pronounced [kohabitatsˈjah ʃeʔeiˈnah ʁeʃuˈmah]; Arabic: المساكنة غير المسجلة, al-musākanah ghayr al-musajjalah) similar to common-law marriage. This status has developed through various court judgments, and allow same-sex couples to claim rights in areas including shared property and financial arrangements, inheritance, social security and survivor's benefits, pension entitlements, and certain immigration and residency rights. However, common-law recognition is not automatic, and couples may have to demonstrate the existence of a genuine, committed partnership.

The first court case to address the legal rights of same-sex couples was El Al Israel Airlines Ltd v. Danilovitz in November 1994. The High Court of Justice ruled that El Al's refusal to extend travel benefits to flight attendant Jonathan Danilovitz's same-sex partner constituted unlawful discrimination on grounds of sexual orientation. The airline provided travel benefits to employees' spouses and unmarried opposite-sex partners, but had refused to provide these same benefits to same-sex partners. In November 2004, the Nazareth District Court ruled in A.M. v. Attorney General that a surviving same-sex partner could qualify for inheritance rights on the same basis as an unmarried heterosexual partner. A landmark Supreme Court decision in Yaros-Hakak v. Attorney General in January 2005 further established that same-sex partners could acquire formal parenthood in relation to the children of the other partner (so-called stepchild adoption). In March 2005, Attorney General Menachem Mazuz accepted that a surviving same-sex partner should be entitled to survivor's benefits from Bituah Leumi on the same basis as a surviving opposite-sex common-law spouse. After the April 2019 elections, it was announced that the Knesset would replace the term "husband and wife" with "couple" on all its official documents, and would grant equal rights to the partners of LGBT legislators, such as permanent entry passes to the Knesset, authorization to drive Knesset-issued cars assigned to their partners, and invitations to all official ceremonies and events. In November 2023, the Knesset passed an amendment to the Families of Fallen Soldiers Law requiring the Israel Defense Forces (IDF) to recognise the surviving partners of LGBT soldiers. Omer Ohana, whose partner Sagi Golan, an IDF reservist who died in Be'eri during a Hamas attack on 7 October 2023, campaigned for the change. Ohana had previously been unable to fully participate in a shiva ceremony as Golan's widower. The law now defines an IDF widower or widow as a person whose partner was killed in combat regardless of gender.

=== Legislative activity ===
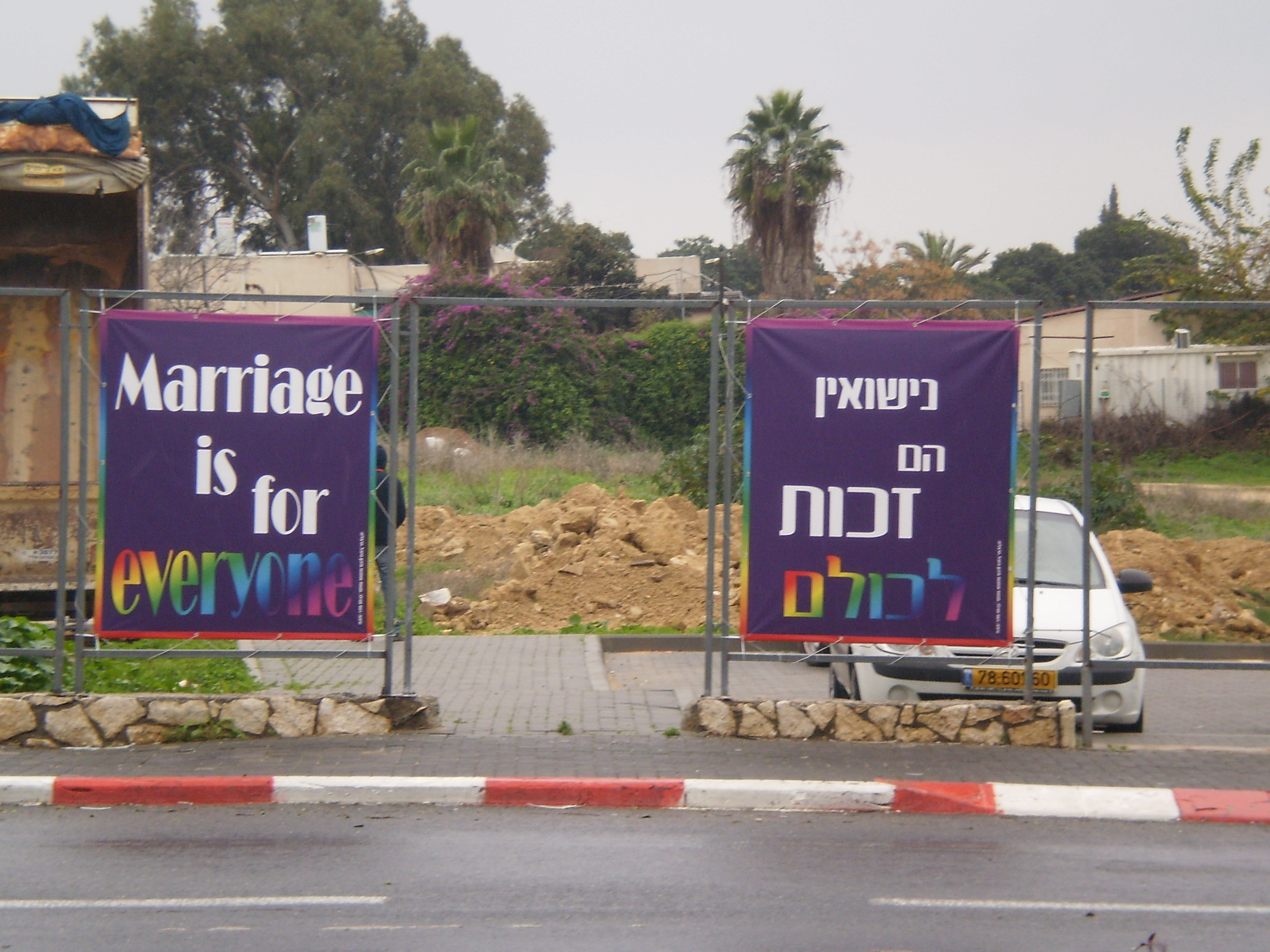
Signs supporting same-sex marriage in Israel in Herzliya, 2012

Several bills to introduced civil marriage, and same-sex marriage, have been introduced to the Knesset since the late 2000s, though all have failed to pass. In March 2010, the Knesset passed the Civil Union Law for Citizens with No Religious Affiliation, 2010 (Hebrew: חוק ברית הזוגיות לחסרי דת, תש״ע-2010, khok brit hazugiyut lechasrei dat, tesha'-2010; Arabic: قانون الاتحاد المدني للمواطنين عديمي الانتماء الديني، 2010, qānūn al-ittiḥād al-madanī lil-muwāṭinīn ʿadīmī al-intimāʾ al-dīnī, 2010). The law allows opposite-sex couples, but not same-sex couples, to form civil unions in Israel if they are both registered as officially not belonging to any religion. In October 2012, the Supreme Court upheld the validity of the law. By 2016, only 121 couples had entered into civil unions.

In February 2009, MK Nitzan Horowitz introduced a civil marriage bill which included provisions for same-sex marriages. The bill was rejected by the Knesset in May 2012, in a 11 to 39 vote, with 70 MKs not attending. In June 2013, Hatnuah MKs, led by Justice Minister Tzipi Livni, introduced a bill to establish civil unions in Israel for both opposite-sex and same-sex couples. In October 2013, Yesh Atid MKs, led by Finance Minister Yair Lapid, introduced a similar bill. Meretz MK Zehava Gal-On introduced a civil marriage bill which included provisions for same-sex marriages. On 8 July 2015, the Knesset voted 39–50 to rejected both the civil union bill proposed by Yesh Atid and the civil marriage bill proposed by Meretz. Hatnuah's bill was rejected on 22 February 2016 in a 40–47 vote. A same-sex marriage bill also failed in the Knesset in June 2018 by three votes, 39 to 42. The bill's sponsor, MK Stav Shaffir from The Zionist Union, blamed its failure on MKs from the coalition government, who had promised publicly that they would vote in favor but who eventually chose to vote against or abstain. The vote happened shortly after an estimated 250,000 people marched in the Tel Aviv Pride Parade, and an opinion poll found that a majority of Israelis supported same-sex marriage.

In August 2022, Prime Minister Lapid urged the Knesset to legalize same-sex marriage. Citing opinion polls, he said, "If most of the public is with us, why did all our bills on the matters fall or get stuck? Why am I the first Israeli prime minister to arrive at an event for the gay community?" Lapid accused other politicians of being "scared" of supporting same-sex marriage. Lapid announced in September 2026 that the new Together alliance was "committed to ensuring equal rights for the LGBTQ community and enabling civil marriage if it joins the next government."

=== Court cases ===
In November 2015, the National LGBT Taskforce of Israel petitioned the Supreme Court to allow same-sex marriage in Israel, arguing that the refusal of the rabbinical court to recognize same-sex marriage should not prevent civil courts from performing same-sex marriages. The court did not immediately rule against the validity of the petition. In January 2017, at a public hearing and in its capacity as the High Court of Justice, two justices of the court implied that the issue of civil and same-sex marriage was the responsibility of the Knesset, rather than the courts. The court handed down its ruling in Israel Organization for Protection of Individual Rights v. Ministry of Interior on 31 August 2017, determining that the issue was the responsibility of the Knesset, and not the judiciary.

=== Recognition of marriages performed abroad ===
Laws regarding homosexuality in Asia Same-sex sexual activity legal Marriage performed Marriage recognized Other type of partnership Unregistered cohabitation No recognition of same-sex couples Restricted or ambiguous Restriction on freedom of expression, not enforced Severe restriction of association with arrests or detention Same-sex sexual activity illegal Prison, not enforced Prison Death penalty on books, not enforced Enforced death penalty

Through a series of court decisions, Israel has progressively recognised the legal status of same-sex marriages performed abroad. On 21 November 2006, the High Court of Justice ruled 6–1 in Ben-Ari v. Director of the Population Administration that same-sex marriages performed abroad in a jurisdiction where such marriages are legal can be recorded with the Population and Immigration Authority (PIBA). The case was filed by five male Israeli couples married in Canada who sought recognition of their marriages back home in Israel. One of the plaintiffs said, "I am glad we won and got what we wanted to achieve in this petition, which was the basic right to be registered as married by the Israeli Ministry of Interior, just as any couple marrying abroad does and takes it for granted." However, the court decision made a crucial distinction between registering a same-sex marriage with the Population Authority and fully recognizing the marriages under Israeli substantive law. President of the Supreme Court Aharon Barak confirmed that the court decision only addressed the former legal question. Nevertheless, registration of same-sex marriage provided an important basis for obtaining treatment as married couples in numerous administrative and legal contexts. LGBTQ advocates welcomed the court decision. It was strongly condemned by Orthodox Jewish politicians, including by MK Moshe Gafni from United Torah Judaism, who called the ruling "the destruction of the family unit in the state of Israel".

Ben-Ari did not settle the general question of whether foreign same-sex marriages should be recognised as marriages under all aspects of Israeli domestic law. In December 2012, a family court in Ramat Gan granted a married same-sex couple a legal divorce. In December 2016, Attorney General Avichai Mandelblit instructed the Ministry of the Interior to consider applications for citizenship by same-sex and opposite-sex spouses equally under the same terms. The same-sex spouse of an Israeli citizen is now able to claim Israeli citizenship after the same interval as an opposite-sex spouse. Previously, same-sex couples had to wait up to seven years, and would generally only be granted permanent residency rather than citizenship. The process was far easier for opposite-sex couples. In June 2020, officials in Tel Aviv-Yafo Municipality announced they would register interfaith and cohabiting same-sex couples as married. Mayor Ron Huldai said the move makes those who register eligible for housing tax discounts as well as easing enrollment of their children in public daycares and schools. In November 2020, officials in Ramat Gan made a similar announcement. Mayor Carmel Shama said the measure had been approved almost unanimously by the city administration, and that it would permit same-sex couples who married abroad to register as married on city documents and be treated on par with married couples for tax and other purposes.

As a result of the COVID-19 pandemic, couples unable to legally marry in Israel could not travel overseas to marry due to restrictions on international travel. Around 500 couples decided to marry through an online civil marriage service established by the U.S. state of Utah. The marriage is officiated by Zoom and for an additional fee the couple can obtain an apostille validation stamp for the marriage license provided by Utah state authorities. In June 2021, the Population and Immigration Authority announced that, despite the marriages having been performed under Utah law, the couples had actually married in Israel and that their marriages therefore could not be treated as foreign marriages. Attorney Vlad Finkelshtein rejected this claim, telling The Jerusalem Post that "every aspect of the wedding was performed in Utah, the office of the marriage registrar was in Utah, and that the computer and the IP address from which the ceremony was broadcast were in Utah". The Ministry of the Interior, led by Ayelet Shaked, instructed to freeze the procedure after three marriages were recognized by the Population Authority, prompting dozens of couples to seek legal action. Judge Efrat Fink of the Central District Court in Lod ruled on 7 July 2022 that the Interior Ministry must recognize all the online marriages. MK Yorai Lahav-Hertzanu welcomed the ruling, saying that it "is important and just, and it simply states the obvious – a couple who marries abroad (even via Zoom) must be recognized in Israel. I urge the state not to appeal this ruling." Rabbi Aaron Leibowitz said, "It is unthinkable to me that a country can allow any of its citizens to become dependent on a foreign entity for such a basic need and right as marriage. This is discriminatory, and causes tremendous pain and alienation, not to mention considerable expense. The rabbinate's position portrays a religion obsessed with controlling others even in the most personal of ways." MK Avi Maoz of the extremist Noam party, known for his violent anti-LGBT beliefs and opposing women serving in the Israel Defense Forces, said that the ruling was "ignoring policy that has been in effect for decades. It's unthinkable that judges in Israel undermine the Jewish state and carry out a quiet coup to make Israel a people's state. God willing, this will be rectified soon." Aryeh Deri urged Attorney General Gali Baharav-Miara to intervene and seek a stay of the ruling. The decision means that couples need not leave Israel to marry any longer; they may be wed in Israel using the online marriage service and then register their marriage with the state, allowing them to apply for government benefits offered to married couples. The decision in Ministry of the Interior v. Bril was upheld by the Supreme Court on 7 March 2023. Foreign same-sex marriages are granted virtually all the rights of marriages performed under Israel domestic law, though some differences for same-sex couples remain, including with regard to automatic parenthood recognition.

== Political viewpoints ==
Political parties and alliances represented in the Knesset following the 2026 legislative election that support same-sex marriage include Yashar, The Democrats, Yesh Atid, and Hadash. The government sworn in after the 2021 election included a theoretical majority of parties in favour of same-sex marriage: Yesh Atid, Blue and White, the Israeli Labor Party, New Hope, and Meretz. However, the government also included socially conservative parties strongly opposed to LGBT rights. In June 2021, Nitzan Horowitz, the leader of Meretz, said the coalition agreement included "a clear commitment to advance the rights of the LGBT community in Israel" and "recognize the status of unmarried couples, including partners of the same sex, as married". The current government includes some far-right, Orthodox Jewish parties which oppose same-sex marriage. President Shimon Peres, in office between 2007 and 2014, expressed support for same-sex marriage in 2013.

Likud has not taken an official position on the issue. Individual Likud members, such as Limor Livnat, Sharren Haskel, Tzachi Hanegbi, Gila Gamliel, Orly Levy-Abekasis, and Miri Regev, have expressed support for LGBT rights, and one of the party's members, Amir Ohana, the Speaker of the Knesset, is openly gay. Prime Minister Benjamin Netanyahu has not stated a position on same-sex marriage, though he has expressed support for LGBT rights. After U.S. President Barack Obama's endorsement of same-sex marriage in May 2012, Vice Prime Minister Moshe Ya'alon, a Likud member at the time, and many other ministers and parliament members announced that they agreed. On the electoral compass devised by Kieskompas for the 2015 election, Likud was categorized as "Tend to agree" with the statement "Same-sex marriage should be legalized". Some Likud members, including Fateen Mulla and Shlomo Karhi, oppose same-sex marriage. New Hope, a short-lived splinter party formed by former Likud members in 2020, supported same-sex marriage.

Yashar, the second largest party in the Knesset, supports civil marriage and same‑sex marriage. The party, led by Gadi Eisenkot, includes several former members of the Blue and White party, which strongly supported same-sex marriage. In a survey conducted by Channel 13 ahead of the 2022 elections, 7 of the 8 Blue and White MKs said they supported same-sex marriage, with one MK, Mufid Mari, declining to comment. Ahead of the September 2019 election, the party announced it would legalize same-sex marriage if elected to government. Yesh Atid supports same-sex marriage, and the establishment of civil marriage in Israel. Party leader Yair Lapid strongly supports both. In a survey conducted by Channel 13 in 2022, 16 of the 17 Yesh Atid MKs said they supported same-sex marriage, with one MK, Elazar Stern, declining to comment. The party is part of the Together alliance along with Naftali Bennett's Bennett 2026 party. Bennett, who had opposed same-sex marriage as leader of The Jewish Home between 2012 and 2018, reversed his position and announced ahead of the 2026 elections that the Together alliance would advance "registering partnerships with the Interior Ministry and providing full equality of rights". Yisrael Beiteinu is a supporter of civil marriage in general, but has not taken a clear position on the subject of LGBT rights. On the electoral compass devised by Kieskompas for the 2015 election, Yisrael Beiteinu was categorized as "Tend to disagree" with the statement "Same-sex marriage should be legalized". Party leader Avigdor Lieberman expressed support for same-sex marriage in 2022.

The Democrats, formed by the merger of the Israeli Labor Party and Meretz in 2024, is one of the most left-leaning parties in the Knesset. It supports same-sex marriage. In 2019, the Labor Party made the legalization of same-sex marriage a condition for joining a coalition government. Tamar Zandberg reiterated Meretz's support ahead of the April 2019 election. The party's leader from 2019 to 2022, Nitzan Horowitz, is openly gay. In a survey conducted by Channel 13 ahead of the 2022 elections, 5 of the 6 Meretz MKs said they supported same-sex marriage, with one MK, Ghaida Rinawie Zoabi, declining to comment. Opposition Leader Shelly Yachimovich expressed support for same-sex marriage in 2012. In February 2013, Tel Aviv Mayor Ron Huldai also expressed support, and reiterated his position in May 2015 following Ireland's legalization of same-sex marriage by popular vote.

Although Shas is consistently conservative on matters of religion and state, MK Ya'akov Margi told Jewish Pluralism Watch in 2014, in response to its question on LGBT rights, that "Israeli citizens' rights cannot be neglected, no matter what they think and how they behave in their personal lives". In September 2017, Yigal Guetta resigned from the Knesset under pressure from rabbis after attending the marriage of his gay nephew. United Torah Judaism opposes same-sex marriage, and LGBT rights in general. Both Orthodox parties are strongly opposed to civil marriage, seeing it as "a religious problem which legitimizes Jewish intermarriage and which would create problematic Jewish personal status issue" according to The Jerusalem Post. MK Yitzhak Pindrus stated in 2019 that United Torah Judaism "would do everything it could" to block civil marriage in Israel. Otzma Yehudit is militantly anti-LGBT.

The Knesset includes two alliances representing the interests of the Arab citizens of Israel: the Joint List, an alliance of left-wing, progressive and anti-Zionist parties, and Ra'am, which is socially conservative and opposes LGBT rights. The Joint List has no official stance on LGBT rights, though leader Ayman Odeh has expressed support for same-sex marriage. Hadash, one of the parties forming the alliance, explicitly supports same-sex marriage.

== Marriage statistics ==
The Israel Central Bureau of Statistics reported in 2019 that 1,151 same-sex couples had registered foreign marriages in Israel since 2006. Male couples accounted for the majority of registrations at 61%. By 2024, without details for same-sex couples, Hiddush estimated that over 3,000 couples in which at least one partner was Israeli had been married via teleconference under Utah law, making up about 30 percent of the non-US citizens using the system.

== Public opinion ==
Support for same-sex marriage among 18–21-year-olds according to a 2016 survey from the Varkey Foundation

According to a Dialog poll conducted in August 2009, 61% of Israelis supported equal marriage rights for same-sex couples, with 31% opposed. 60% supported joint adoption by same-sex couples, with 34% opposed. A June 2016 poll showed that 76% of respondents supported civil unions or same-sex marriage, including 46% of Dati Jews and 16% of Haredi Jews. A September–October 2016 survey by the Varkey Foundation found that 50% of 18–21-year-olds supported same-sex marriage in Israel.

A Rafi Smith Institute poll conducted in June 2017 asked Israelis, "Do you think same-sex couples should be permitted to marry or have civil unions in Israel?" 79% expressed support for either same-sex marriage or civil unions. When divided by political affiliation, 100% of Meretz and Zionist Union (Labor and Hatnuah) voters were in favour of recognizing same-sex unions, as well as 94% of Yesh Atid voters, 90% of Kulanu voters, 84% of Likud voters, 83% of Yisrael Beiteinu voters, and 65% of The Jewish Home voters. A majority of Shas and United Torah Judaism voters were against recognizing same-sex unions. The margin of error was 4.5%. A June 2018 survey found that 58% of Israelis were in favour of same-sex marriage. Additionally, 59 Knesset members (MKs) responded to the survey. Of these, 47 expressed support for same-sex marriage, while the remaining 12 expressed opposition. When divided by political parties, all Meretz and Labor lawmakers responded and answered "yes" when asked if they supported same-sex marriage. 4 Likud lawmakers expressed support, while 2 said they were opposed; the remaining did not answer. Kulanu had two supportive MKs, with the rest not responding. The Jewish Home, Shas, and United Torah Judaism together had 5 opposed MKs, and none in favour. The Joint List had two in support, five in opposition, and six who did not answer. No Yisrael Beiteinu lawmaker responded to the survey. LGBT activists subsequently urged the Knesset to act on the issue and legalize same-sex marriage, as "there is broad public support".

An opinion poll conducted by Hiddush and published in June 2019 showed that 78% of Israelis supported same-sex marriage or partnerships. Asked, "In your opinion, should couples of the same sex be allowed to marry or register as partners in Israel?", 78% answered positively, whereas 22% objected to the idea. Broken down by level of religiosity, 93% of secular Jews and 54% of religious Jews expressed support. When asked, "Assuming that same-sex marriages or partnerships are instituted in Israel, do you think that such couples should enjoy all the rights of a married couple consisting of a man and a woman?", 73% were in support, 9% believed only some rights should be granted, while 19% were opposed to any rights. The poll had a margin of error of 4.5%. A Pew Research Center poll conducted between February and May 2023 showed that 36% of Israelis supported same-sex marriage, 56% were opposed and 8% did not know or had refused to answer. When divided by political affiliation, support was highest among those on the left of the political spectrum at 60%, followed by those at the center at 57% and those on the right at 21%. 41% of Jewish respondents supported same-sex marriage, compared to 8% of Muslim respondents. Support was highest among secular Jews at around 75%, but decreased significantly to 29% support among Masorti Jews and 4% support among Haredi and Dati Jews.

A May 2023 poll by Channel 13 found that 61% of Israelis supported equal rights for LGBT people. In addition, 52% of respondents supported same-sex marriage, while 36% were opposed. A January 2026 survey conducted by the Israel Institute for Gender and LGBT Studies showed that 64% of Israelis supported same-sex marriage.

== See also ==
- LGBT rights in Israel
- Recognition of same-sex unions in Asia
