= Mehadrin =

Mehadrin may refer to:

- Mehadrin (lit. beautified), higher standards of a mitzvah (especially as pertains to Kashruth, Sta"m, Lulav and Etrog, Chanukah Menorah, etc.)
- Mehadrin Dairy Corporation, an American Chalav Yisrael dairy company
- Mehadrin bus lines, an Israeli bus company
