= Child support in Israel =

The laws governing child support in Israel can be tried under either civil courts or religious courts. Jewish, Muslim, Druze and Christian courts are officially recognised by the Israeli state as having jurisdiction over family matters, if a case is first filed in those courts. Secular courts have jurisdiction if a case is first filed with them.

Following a 2017 Supreme Court of Israel case, and for ages 6–15 only, both parents are considered responsible for the maintenance of children ages 6–15, while formerly only fathers were considered responsible. For ages 0–6, and 15-18 the law still binds men only to pay child support to the mother, in any case, even when the mother earns a higher income, or when the father is half-time caretaker, which critics argue is discriminatory against men.

If the obligor (the parent who should pay child support, usually the non-custodial parent) does not do so, the obligee (the parent entitled to receive the child support, usually the custodial parent) can apply to the National Insurance Institute of Israel, which will pay partial child support instead of the obligor and will then seek out the obligor in order to receive restitution of the amount paid to the obligee.

Israeli law bars its citizens and dual or foreign nationals with outstanding child support arrears from leaving the country until the debt is settled. Any person who received a stay of exit order is required to pay the full support payment of their children up until the age of 18 in advance, with the debt sometimes amounting to millions of US dollars. They are required to relinquish up to 100% or more of their income to satisfy the debt, and they can be jailed for up to 21 days each time they fail to make a monthly payment. British journalist Marianne Azizi estimated that hundreds of Australian men who were married to Israelis were trapped in Israel, including one man who was prohibited from leaving the country until 31 December 9999. In a 2013 Times of Israel blog post, Adam Herscu described the law as being "draconian and excessively discriminatory against men".

== See also ==
- Child support by country
