= Marriage in Palestine =

Legal processes for marriage in the Palestinian territories

People of the Palestinian territories—the West Bank (including East Jerusalem) and the Gaza Strip—are bound by differing laws that handle marital unions on the basis of the couple's national status and religious affiliation. After the 1948 Arab–Israeli War, the Palestinian residents of the Jordanian-annexed West Bank and the Egyptian-occupied Gaza Strip became subject to Jordanian marriage law and Egyptian marriage law, respectively. After the 1967 Arab–Israeli War, which saw Israel capture the Palestinian territories from Jordan and Egypt, those original laws largely remained in place.

Since the beginning of Israel's occupation of the West Bank in 1967, all of the territory's Jewish settlements have been subject to Israeli marriage law. Additionally, all residents of Israeli-annexed East Jerusalem (including Arabs) are also subject to Israeli marriage law.

The Palestinian National Authority, which was established by the Oslo Accords in 1994, continues to apply a modified version of the original Jordanian marriage law throughout the West Bank, excluding East Jerusalem and Jewish settlements. Since taking control of the Gaza Strip in 2007, Hamas continues to apply the Egyptian marriage law of the 1950s throughout the territory.

== Laws ==
Personal status issues of Muslims in the Palestinian territories, including marriage, are governed by customary law, of the Sunni Islam Hanafi school (despite most Palestinian Muslims follow the Shafi'i school) as codified and modified by legislation as follows:

- for Muslims in the West Bank - the Jordanian Personal Status Law of 1976 continues to apply. However, PA Law no. 5 of 2018, signed on 14 March 2018, repealed the marry-your-rapist law contained in article 308 of the 1960 Jordan Penal Code.
- for Muslims in the Gaza Strip - the Egyptian Law of Family Rights 1954 continues to apply.
- Muslims in East Jerusalem, which is claimed by both Israel and the Palestinian Authority, are subject to Israeli marriage law, which is based on the Israeli Millet system, which applies to Muslims in Israel the Ottoman Law of Family Rights as amended by Israeli legislation since 1948. Since at least 1959, polygamous marriages have been prohibited in Israel, which applies to members of each confessional community, including the Jewish and Muslim.

Registration of marriage is mandatory, but failure to register a marriage does not invalidate the marriage.

As at March 2012, work is reported to be proceeding on the text of a Palestinian personal status law.

== Minimum marriage age ==
In the Gaza Strip, the Egyptian-issued Law of Family Rights 1954 set puberty as the minimum age of marriage with no marriage allowed for a female aged under 9 or a male aged under 12. The Palestinian Qadi al-Quda issued an administrative decision in 1995 raising these ages in Gaza to a minimum of 15 for a female and 16 for a male, which aligned with the Jordanian law which applied to the West Bank. In 2010, in the West Bank, the minimum age of marriage was 15 for girls and 16 for boys. In Gaza the minimum age was 17 for girls and 18 for boys. Judges had the power to approve an earlier marriage. In November 2019, the PA government raised the minimum marriage age to 18 for both genders in an effort to reduce rates of early marriage.

According to statistics, 37% of married Palestinian females married when they were under the age of 18, including 5% who married before the age of 15. 63% of young married women suffer violence at the hands of their husband, and 95% would not recommend early marriage for their daughters. Child marriage is thought to contribute to the high rate of divorce in the Palestinian territories, where 67% of women who divorced in 2018 were aged 18 to 29.

== Polygamy ==
Polygyny, where a husband has more than one wife, is legal in the Hamas ruled Gaza Strip and the Palestinian Authority ruled West Bank. This is due in part to its explicit permission under Islam; there are also the classical injunctions that a man must treat all co-wives equitably and provide them with separate dwellings, and a man must declare his social status in the marriage contract.

Polygynous unions are illegal under Israeli marriage law, and as such are prohibited in Israeli ruled West Bank settlements and East Jerusalem. Both it and polyandry are punishable by up to five years in prison.

Polyandry, whereby a wife has more than one husband, is not permitted under Palestinian or Israeli law.

== Other issues ==
=== Violence against women within marriage ===
Violence against women within marriage is a major issue facing women in Palestine. According to a 2005 survey by the Palestinian Central Bureau of Statistics, 23.3% of women who had ever been married reported that they had been subjected to physical violence, 61.7% to psychological violence, and 10% to sexual violence. It's estimated that 30% of married women in the West Bank and 50% in Gaza will be subjected to domestic violence, and less than 1% will seek the help of a social worker, a shelter, a civil-society organisation or the police.

In 2008 the Palestinian Police established the Family Protection Unit and the Juvenile Unit (FJPU), tasked with investigating complaints of domestic violence and sexual assault. Since the introduction of the FJPU, the number of cases of domestic violence reported to police have increased dramatically, with 3,660 reported in 2013.

Violence against women is especially problematic in Gaza, with the number of incidences being generally higher. Police in Gaza reportedly refrain from publishing statistics on the number of complaints women make against their husbands, to deter more women from speaking up. One move to address marriage issue in Gaza has been the adoption of "Mukhtaras", female community leaders able to mediate between families and communities on issues involving women, such as marriage, divorce, custody and alimony. The Aisha Association for Woman and Child Protection works to empower vulnerable women and children who are victims of violence.

=== Marry-your-rapist laws ===
Although this is not an Islamic practice,since being annexed by Egypt in 1959, the Gaza Strip has applied Egyptian penal law Articles 290 and 291, a marry-your-rapist law that allowed an accused rapist to evade punishment by marrying his victim. These provisions were repealed in Egypt itself in 1999, but continued to apply in the Gaza Strip.

After being annexed by Jordan in 1950, the 1960 Jordanian penal law Article 308, which contained a similar provision, has applied in the West Bank. It is unclear how often the law was applied in practice. Ikhlas Sufan, director of a Nablus victims of violence shelter, told Human Rights Watch that "between 2011 and 2017 prosecution for rape has been halted in 60 cases – in which the shelter was helping the women – after the alleged rapist agreed to marry the victim. In 15 of these cases the women later divorced these men." An activist campaign put pressure on the Palestinian Authority President Mahmoud Abbas who eventually signed Law no. 5 of 2018 on 14 March 2018, which repealed article 308 of the 1960 Jordon Penal Code enforced in the West Bank.
