= Uri Regev =

Israeli rabbi

- אורי רגב
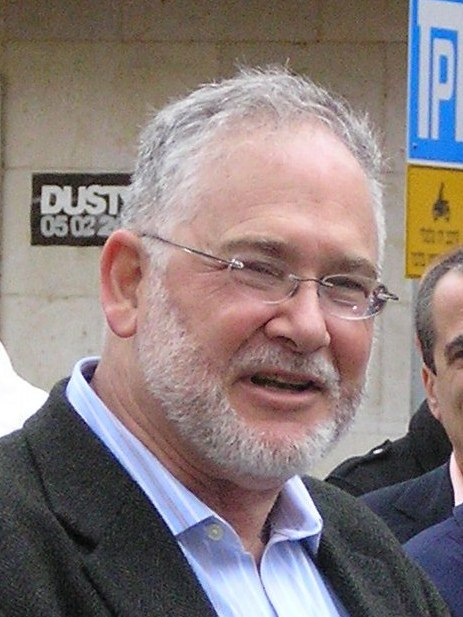
- Born: 1951 (age 74–75); Tel Aviv
- Education: Tel Aviv University Law School and the Hebrew Union College-Institute of Religion in Jerusalem
- Occupations: Rabbi, Lawyer

Uri Regev (Hebrew: אורי רגב) is a lawyer and rabbi of the Reform movement of Judaism in Israel, and an active civil rights and religious pluralism advocate. Currently he serves as the president and CEO of “Hiddush – For Freedom of Religion and Equality”, a trans-denominational nonprofit organization aimed at promoting religious freedom and equality in Israel, a partnership between Israeli Jews and World Jewry, founded in 2009.

== Biography ==
Uri Regev was born in Tel Aviv in 1951 to a secular family. As a child he had no interest in religion. His first contact with the Reform movement was in 1967, when he joined a student delegation to Jewish communities in the United States. After returning to Israel, he joined the small Reform youth movement.

Regev studied law at Tel Aviv University Law School and went on to practice law. In the late 1970s, he began studying at the Reform movement′s rabbinical school, Hebrew Union College - Jewish Institute of Religion, where he was ordained in 1986. He served in the Israeli Defense Force (IDF) as an assistant legal advisor in the Gaza Strip and Sinai and as military prosecutor for the Israeli Navy. He retired from military service with the rank of lieutenant colonel.

Regev lives in Jerusalem with his wife, Garri. They have a son and daughter.

== Social activism ==
Regev has been executive director of the Israel Religious Action Center (IRAC), the political arm of the Reform movement in Israel, and President of the World Union for Progressive Judaism. Israeli newspaper Haaretz described him as a "charismatic figure who speaks eloquently and often sharply and has an impressive work output,” and credits him and Oli Sloam with changing the Reform Movement′s face in Israel and making IRAC the most active institution within the movement, turning it “into a factor that both the religious and political establishment cannot ignore”.

Regev won in the Supreme Court some of the recent landmark cases regarding Religion and State in Israel, including the recognition of Reform and Conservative conversion performed abroad. The long legal battle for the recognition of Reform conversion and the political struggle against the Conversion Law led to the appointment of the Ne'eman Commission, which recommended the creation of a common conversion institute for all three streams of Judaism - a recommendation that was accepted by the Chief Rabbinate.

Regev is a founding member of B'Tselem, the organization monitoring human rights in the occupied territories, and has served on the boards of many Jewish organizations, including the World Zionist Organization, the Jewish Agency, Rabbis for Human Rights, and the Association for Civil Rights in Israel.
