= Child support by country =

This article includes information about the child support policies of several countries.

== Child support by country ==
=== Australia ===
In Australia, the Child Support Agency calculates child support based on the income of each parent, a base amount is excluded, and the number of nights the child(ren) stays overnight with each parent. Parents can seek a review within 28 days of a change where income, assets or other factors lead to the formula not giving a result reflecting the particulars of a case.

=== Canada ===
In Canada, the table amount is based on the gross annual income of the payor parent and the number of children they have to support. Gross annual income is the total income a person earns in the year before subtracting taxes and other deductions. Child support guidelines in Canada derive from federal, provincial and territorial laws.

=== Czech Republic ===
In the Czech Republic, child support is usually decided as part of child custody proceedings. The court may award child support as far back as three years before the case was started. The amount of child support depends on the particular custody arrangement, parents’ net income and whether they have other support obligations. A failure to pay child support in line with final judgement is a crime punishable by up to three years in prison.

=== India ===
Unlike laws related to marriage, inheritance, and family matters, which are governed by personal laws, child support in India is governed by the Bharatiya Nagarik Suraksha Sanhita, the primary code of criminal procedure in India. Section 144 of the Sanhita empowers magistrates to pass an order of maintenance to any person having sufficient means who neglects or refuses to maintain his legitimate or Illegitimate child.

=== Israel ===
A little-known law in Israel allows for divorced Israeli nationals and foreign citizens to be detained in the country via a court-issued stay of exit order until they pay the full child support owed for their children until age 18 in advance. They can be jailed for up to 21 days for each missed monthly payment, and they are required to pay up to 100% or more of their income to settle the debt.

=== New Zealand ===
In New Zealand, the Child Support division of Inland Revenue manages the application for, collection and redistribution of child support. Liable parents are assessed using a formula assessment scheme that determines payment liability based on the liable person's income and family circumstances. Departures from the formula are permitted under special circumstances, such as hardship, financial assets, special needs or through parental agreements. Payments are compulsory, with a minimum payment required, irrespective of ability to pay, though prisoners and long term hospital patients can apply for exemptions. Application for child support can be made by any person responsible for caring for a child but is only required if a parent receives welfare payments for themselves and their children. Children qualify for child support while they are aged under 18 years and are dependent on a caregiver.

Since July 2000, New Zealand and Australia have had a reciprocal agreement on child support. If the non-custodian parent lives in Australia, then Australia's Child Support Agency can collect child support and pursue debt collection on behalf of New Zealand's Inland Revenue Child Support, and vice versa.

=== Norway ===
Norway has a long history in its commitment to protecting children and was the first country to appoint a children's ombudsman in 1981, inspiring similar practices globally. The child protection service, Barnevernet, primarily focuses on working with families to resolve issues and keep children with their parents. However, there has been a significant increase in the number of children and young people taken into emergency care, rising by half between 2008 and 2013.

=== South Africa ===
Under South African law, both parents are obligated to provide financial maintenance for their children, regardless of marital status. The amount of maintenance is determined based on each parent's income and must be negotiated in accordance with the Maintenance Act 99 of 1998 and the Children's Act, 2005. Failure to meet these obligations is a criminal offense. In the event of a divorce, interim maintenance can be obtained to support the child until the divorce is finalized. Unmarried fathers have the right to maintenance responsibilities but may face challenges in accessing their children.

=== Sweden ===
In Sweden, a parent not living with their child should pay "underhållsbidrag", since parents are obliged to support for their children. The amount should be agreed on by the parents, with consideration taken for the economic need of the child and the economic situation of both parents. This may be in the form of a contract or simply an agreement. With joint custody where the child lives with each parents roughly half of the time no child support needs to be paid. The amount agreed on is adjusted for inflation each year (though it has been raised by 0% some years).

If the parent supposed to pay child support doesn't pay (or doesn't pay in time), the child may receive "underhållsstöd" from Försäkringskassan. This includes if the parent pays less than 1273 SEK per month and doesn't provide equivalent support some other way. The parent not living with the child should repay the amount paid as far as his/her income allows this, and may have to pay interest on the debt to Försäkringskassan.

The support belongs to the child, but is paid to the parent. It is paid until the child turns 18. For a child that is still in high school or equivalent, the support may be extended until the child turns 21, and after 18 it is given to the child directly.

For international cases, see Försäkringskassan's website and "Convention on the Recovery Abroad of Maintenance" in Swedish law, and relevant EU treaty (in Swedish).

=== United Kingdom ===
In the UK, the requisite contribution is calculated by the Child Maintenance Service, which is part of the Department for Work and Pensions.

=== United States ===
In United States, child support is the ongoing obligation for a periodic payment made directly or indirectly by an ("obligor" or paying parent) to an ("obligee" or receiving party) for the financial care and support of children of a relationship or marriage that has been terminated, or in some cases never existed.

Often, but not always, the obligor is a non-custodial parent. Often, but not always, the obligee is a custodial parent, caregiver or guardian, or the government.

In the U.S., there is no gender requirement to child support, for example, a father may pay a mother or a mother may pay a father. Depending on the jurisdiction, a non-custodial parent may pay child support to a custodial parent, or a custodial parent may pay child support to a non-custodial parent.

In addition, where there is joint custody, both parents are "custodial parents" and neither parent is a non-custodial parents, or in other words the child has two custodial parents. Thus, with joint custody, one custodial parent (as an obligor) may be required to pay the other custodial parent (as an obligee).

Child support enforcement in the United States at the Federal level is the responsibility of the Administration for Children and Families in the Department of Health and Human Services. Attorney General helps enforce child support payments. There is an overarching framework of federal legislation (title IV-D of the Social Security Act) and regulation within which the states must operate if they wish to receive federal funding. States may also receive additional financial "incentive" payments for establishing paternity, or establishing or modifying child support orders. Although the federal child support program in the United States traces its origins to a congressional concern for recouping from absent parents some of the cash assistance paid to custodial parents, total U.S. child support collections in Federal fiscal year 2006 totaled $23.9 billion, $11 billion of which was paid to families who have never been recipients of public assistance.

Each state is responsible for developing a child support enforcement program that complies with federal requirements, including a Guidelines method of calculating child support. At a minimum, 45 C.F.R. 302.56 requires each state to establish and publish a Guideline that is presumptively (but rebuttably) correct, and Review the Guideline, at a minimum, every four (4) years. Most states have their own "Child Support Guidelines Worksheet" used by local courts and state Child Support Enforcement Offices to determine a "standard calculation" of child support. Courts may deviate from this standard calculation in particular cases.

The Uniform Interstate Family Support Act addresses the interaction of varying State legislation and regulations to ensure that only one state has the power to impose or modify child support at any one time, providing:

- Reciprocal recognition of orders between states
- Enforcement of child support across state lines
- Conflict of laws and orders awarded by different states.

Particular issues of conflict are further discussed in the Child support in the United States article regarding conflict of laws for the states of California, Connecticut, the District of Columbia and Maryland.

Major federal child support enforcement laws:

- 1975: Social Security Act, Title IV, Section D
- 1984: Child Support Amendments
- 1988: Family Support Act
- 1992: Child Support Recovery Act
- 1993: Omnibus Budget Reconciliation Act
- 1994: Full Faith and Credit Act
- 1996: Personal Responsibility and Work Opportunities Reconciliation Act
- 1998: Dead Beat Parents Punishment Act
- 2000: Non-custodial Parent Federal Employee Health Insurance Requirement for Children

== See also ==
- Child custody
- Legal custody
- Physical custody
- Child benefit
