= Marriage in Cyprus =

Marriage in Cyprus is allowed for both Cyprus citizens and foreigners. It may be performed by civil or religious authorities. Around 20,000 Israelis marry in Cyprus annually, many of them seeking to avoid restrictions on marriage in Israel.

== Lebanese marriages in Cyprus ==
Lebanon has no civil marriage law. Marriage, divorce, child custody and inheritance are instead governed by 15 religious personal status laws, which apply to the countries 18 official recognized sects (see: Sectarianism in Lebanon). For Lebanese inter-religious couples, a secular civil marriage in Cyprus is therefore an option that allows both partners to retain their respective religions, while circumventing religious and sectarian laws as well as social norms in Lebanon. Cyprus being a close and cheap option, is a frequent destination for such marriages.

Lebanon keeps no unified records of marriages: civil marriages are recorded by the Ministry of Interior, while each of the 15 personal status courts keeps its own records. According to anthropologist Lara Deeb, recent estimates suggest that between 1200-2500 of the roughly 40.000 marriages among Lebanese each year are civil marriages, with between 560 and 700 of these taking place in Cyprus. Deeb adds that civil marriages abroad have increased since the end of the Lebanese Civil War and that the Cyprus wedding industry has grown rapidly.

Efforts to introduce a civil marriage law in Lebanon have repeatedly failed. Deeb lists attempts to pass such a law through parliament in 1957, 1972, 1976, 1977, 1985, 1996, 2011, 2013 and 2014, all of which succumbed to clerical and political pressure.
