= Mehadrin bus lines =

Israeli transport company

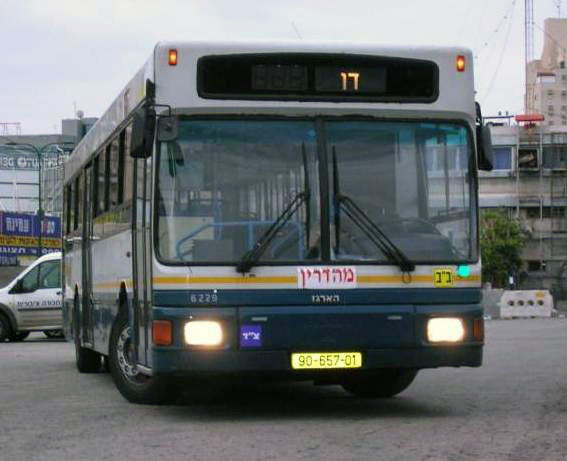
A Dan bus labeled "mehadrin" which served the Haredi neighborhoods in the city of Bnei Brak. Photo taken in January 2006

Mehadrin bus lines (Hebrew: קו מהדרין) were a type of bus line in Israel that mostly ran in and/or between major Haredi population centers and in which gender segregation and other rigid religious rules observed by some Haredi Jews were applied from 1997 until 2011. In these sex-segregated buses, female passengers sat in the back of the bus and entered and exited the bus through the back door if possible, while the male passengers sat in the front part of the bus and entered and exited through the front door. Additionally, "modest dress" was often required for women, playing radio channels or secular music on the bus was avoided, while advertisements were censored. Mehadrin lines were generally cheaper than other lines. In early 2010, there were 56 Mehadrin buses in 28 cities across Israel operated by public transportation companies, although usually not specifically labelled.

In January 2011, the Israeli High Court of Justice ruled that gender segregation was unlawful and abolished the "mehadrin" public buses. However, the court rule allowed the continuation of the gender segregation in public buses on a strictly voluntary basis for a one-year experimental period. Before the ruling, female passengers were frequently harassed and forced to sit at the back of the bus. Haredim requested to operate private bus lines, but they were blocked by the transportation ministry.

Advocacy groups who fought segregated bus lines claimed that discrimination against women in public buses was maintained one year later. Incidents in which women were ordered by ultra-Orthodox men to sit at the back of buses and were abused when they refused, have been reported. As of 2013, Haredim surrounded and stoned buses after the drivers explained to passengers that women cannot be forced to sit in the back, breaking windows until they were arrested; a month later, a secular man punched, and pulled the beard of, a Haredi who tried to get a woman to move, then he escaped arrest.

== Etymology ==
Mehadrin is a term generally used with the loose meaning of highly observant of Jewish religious law, mostly in regard to food. Its initial use related specifically to lighting candles on Hanukkah, became widely used in regard to enhanced or stricter dietary laws, and ended up covering almost every aspect of Jewish observance.

== History ==
The so-called "mehadrin" bus lines were created in the late 1990s for the Haredi public. It began with two lines in Jerusalem and Bnei Brak in 1997. In fall 2001, Dan and Egged bus companies, in order to compete with private buses run by Haredim, had come to an agreement with the ultra-Orthodox Mehadrin Council. In 2007, there were an estimated thirty "mehadrin" buses operated by public transportation companies, in early 2010 the number had risen to more than fifty.

In July 2004, American-Israeli novelist Naomi Ragen unintentionally boarded a "mehadrin" bus toward her home in Ramot and was physically threatened for refusing to give up her seat and move to the back of the bus. In 2006, "mehadrin" buses were heavily criticized in the media worldwide after an American Jewish woman, Miriam Shear, reported being attacked and beaten by a group of ultra-Orthodox men after refusing to move to the back of the bus on a non-segregated line. Shear and another male passenger accused the bus driver of "doing nothing" during the attack, while the bus driver claimed to have stopped the bus to inform the men surrounding Shear that his line was not sex-segregated. Critics likened the "mehadrin" lines to racial segregation in the United States, with Shear compared to African American icon Rosa Parks.

According to a survey conducted by the Smith Research Institute in Summer 2010 for the organization Hiddush, 70% of Jewish Israelis, male and female, support abolishing or reducing the gender-segregated public bus lines. 40% support complete abolition, 30% are in favor of reducing their number and 22% support continuing the arrangement as it was at the time of the survey. Only 8% supports further expanding gender-separated transportation services. Among those supporting the abolition or reduction of gender-segregated public bus lines are 75% of Likud voters, 76% of Yisrael Beytenu voters, and 88% of Kadima voters. A Jerusalem Post online poll found that 76% of those who responded did not approve of segregated buses, 6% approved and 18% said that segregation should only exist in lines that operate in Haredi neighborhoods.

== Petition and court ruling ==
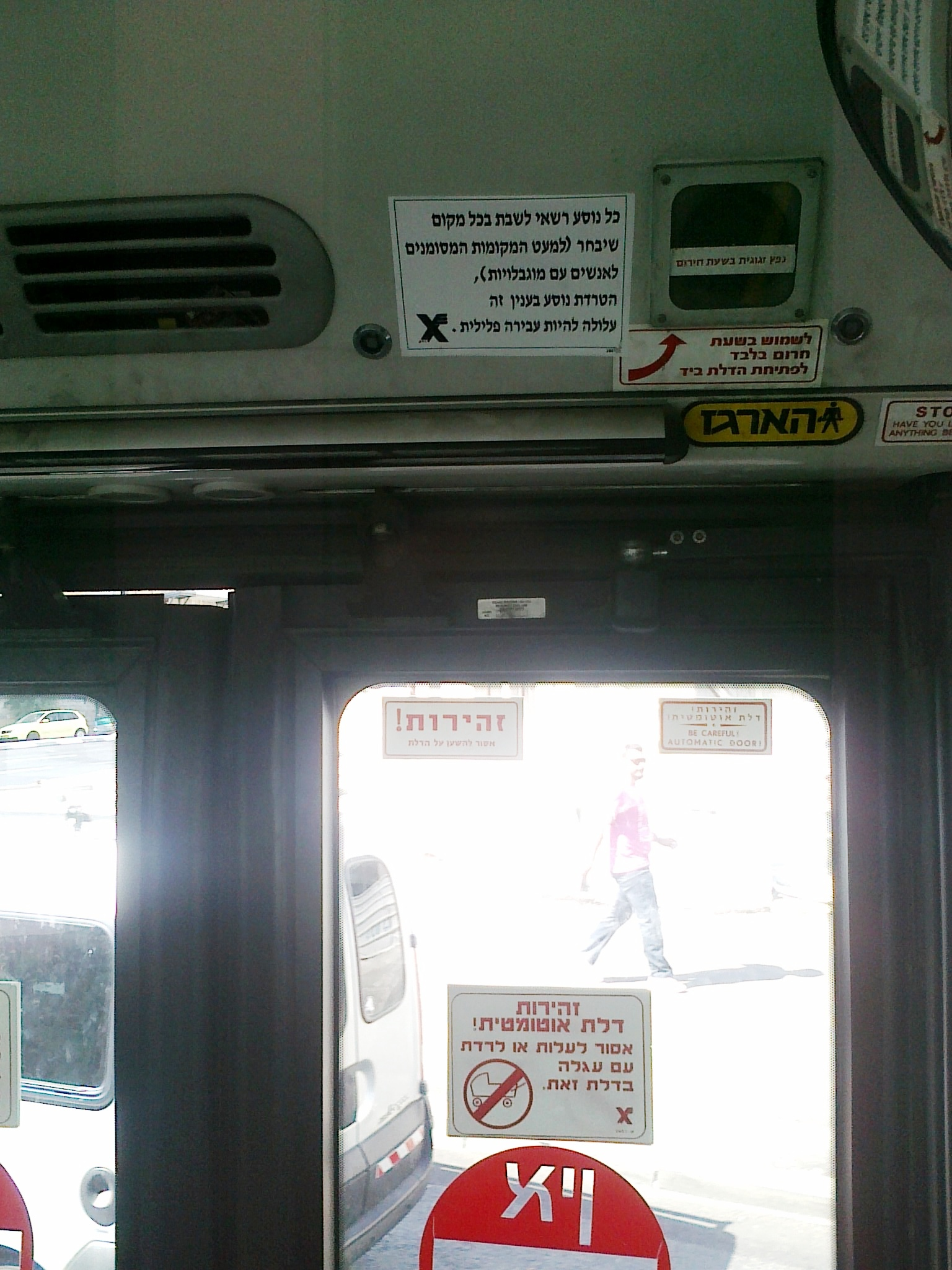
Sticker at top reads: "Every passenger may sit wherever s/he chooses (except seats designated for disabled persons), harassing a passenger in this regard may be a criminal offense". (June 2011)

In 2007, the Israel Religious Action Center (IRAC), an organization close to Israel's Reform movement, together with several women who were harassed while traveling on gender-segregated buses (including Shear and Ragen), submitted a petition demanding the introduction of alternative lines without gender segregation and requiring the authorities to ensure the safety of female passengers. The Ministry of Transportation replied that the gender segregation is a "voluntary arrangement" and that the ministry did not intend to intervene.

In January 2008, the Supreme Court recommended that the Ministry of Transportation appoint a committee to examine the matter. In its report published in October 2009, the committee came to the conclusion that gender segregation in public buses is illegal and that arrangements in public transportation that include segregation, inherently entail a dimension of coercion. The committee's main recommendation was to introduce a temporary arrangement on the bus lines that had imposed gender segregation, in which both the door in front and in the back would be opened at the bus stops, instead of just the door in front, as customary in Israel, giving women the possibility to use the back door and sit in the back, but that each passenger, male or female, could choose where to sit with no defined segregation, and no specific seating arrangement would be enforced. Transportation Minister Yisrael Katz, in an affidavit to the High Court, said in February 2010, that the state would not tolerate the use of threats and violence to enforce the separation. However, he suggested, that bus operators should be permitted to hang "behavior-directing" signs asking passengers to sit separately, but indicating that this is not mandatory. According to the state, who was required to monitor these buses, there were no problems, but data collected by IRAC showed numerous cases of abuse, harassment, and even women being denied entrance to the bus.

In its ruling on January 6, 2011, the High Court of Israel did not allow the creation of additional segregated lines and ruled that gender segregation was illegal and ordered that signs designating buses as segregated were to be removed and new signs to be put up informing passengers that they had the right to sit wherever they wanted, and stressed that neither passengers nor the driver could pressure anyone into complying with a segregated seating arrangement. In his ruling, Supreme Court Justice Elyakim Rubinstein wrote: "A public transportation company (like any other person) cannot say, ask or order women where to sit on a bus simply because they are women, nor what they should wear, and they are entitled to sit anywhere they wish. Of course, this also applies to the men, but for reasons that are obvious, the complaints have to do with the harmful behavior toward women." And he added: "As I now read over these lines emphasizing this I am astounded that there was even a need to write them in the year 2010. Have the days of Rosa Parks, the African American woman who collapsed the racist segregation on an Alabama bus in 1955 returned?"

In a one-year experiment to see whether a voluntary segregation system could function, about 50 bus lines, serving both inter and inner city, are registered under the High Court of Justice as lines in which voluntary segregation is followed. They reportedly operate in and between ultra-Orthodox neighborhoods with a Hasidic majority.

The Egged bus company was also ordered to publish ads about the cancellation of the "mehadrin" gender-separation arrangement in three daily publications, including at least one haredi newspaper. In February 2011, the Jerusalem Post reported that all haredi newspapers had refused to publish the ads. One of them even presented the High Court's decision "as a victory, enshrining the arrangement".

== Enforcement ==
Fearing that the court's orders might not be properly enforced by the bus companies, IRAC launched a year-long Rosa Parks-inspired Freedom Rider project. Foreign and local female volunteers will be assigned a bus route that has been considered "mehadrin" until the court's ruling, and will sit in the front section of the buses which used to be reserved for men.

In early June 2011, Haaretz reported that Egged allegedly violated the Supreme Court ruling. According to the report, a haredi magazine published an ad describing arrangements for gender segregation on Egged buses linking Ashdod and Jerusalem for the holiday of Shavuot. The ad announced separate buses for families and for men only, accompanied by a supervisor on board. Egged called the announcement "a forgery which was done without the knowledge of Egged", affirming that there is no "mehadrin" concept on their buses and that the company "operates only in line with Supreme Court instructions and allows every passenger to select his seat without gender discrimination." If there were only men on a bus, it was "because there was no demand by women, and not because there were instructions from anyone which prevented the travel of women", according to the bus company. The head of the Free Israel movement which fights segregated bus lines doubts this, and claims that "Egged and the Ministry of Transportation ... use any means, to cooperate with the Haredi politicians in order not to carry out the Supreme Court decision, and in essence maintain these bus lines which discriminate against women".

On December 17, 2011, Tanya Rosenblit, a secular Israeli woman, refused to move to the back of Egged bus 451 from Ashdod to Jerusalem, where women commonly sit in the back, when told to by a Haredi man, who allegedly called her a shikse, a derogatory word for a non-Jewish woman. A policeman called to the scene by the bus driver, instead of explaining the law to the offending man, asked Rosenblit to move to the back. The incident made headlines both in Israeli and international media, and Rosenblit was hailed as "Israeli Rosa Parks". According to an Egged spokesperson, who condemned the incident, the number of such incidents is increasing.

On December 28, 2011, on city bus line 49A in Jerusalem's Ramat Eshkol neighborhood, a Haredi man allegedly asked Doron Matalon, a female IDF soldier at the time, to move to the back of the bus. When she refused, he allegedly called her a "slut" and continued to harass her until the driver called the police. The man was arrested and charged with sexual harassment and unruly misconduct in a public place before being released on bail.

== Response ==
On December 3, 2011, U.S. Secretary of State Hillary Clinton, speaking to a closed forum in Washington, expressed concern about Israel's democracy and shock over discrimination against Israeli women, some of which she said reminded her of Iran, mentioning among other examples that females sit in the back of buses in certain places in Israel. Members of the Israeli government denied that there is any justification in Clinton's criticism of Israeli democracy. However, finance minister Yuval Steinitz agreed that "the matter of excluding and segregating women is completely unacceptable and needs to be put to a stop", and environmental protection minister Gilad Erdan said he shares "the concern over the dignity of women", adding that "the government should take steps to demonstrate its commitment to equality between men and women".

On the Sunday after the incident on Egged bus 451 on December 17, 2011, Israeli Prime Minister Benjamin Netanyahu stated at the beginning of the weekly cabinet meeting: "I heard about an incident in which a woman was moved on a bus. I adamantly oppose this. Fringe groups must not be allowed to tear apart our common denominator. We must preserve public space as open and safe for all citizens of Israel".

Opposition leader Tzipi Livni made a personal call to Tanya Rosenblit and praised her for her "personal bravery", stating that "her determination symbolizes the need for all of us who fear for Israel's image to fight and not give in".

Rosenblit was invited to testify before an inter-ministerial committee headed by Culture and Sports Minister Limor Livnat that is to develop a government action plan dealing with the exclusion of women in public places.”

Ashkenazi Chief Rabbi Yona Metzger declared on an ultra-Orthodox radio station that "if we want there to be segregation, it would be most legitimate for us to create a special bus company for these specific lines, so that we can be their 'landlords'. But as long as they pay as we do, and it is a public company that serves not only the ultra-Orthodox sector, what can we do?"

Even close associates of Rabbi Yosef Shalom Elyashiv, a leading rabbi of the non-Hasidic ultra-Orthodoxy in Israel, who is signatory to a kol kore in favor of bus segregation, declare to the media that they oppose forced segregation.

== See also ==
- B110 (New York City bus)
- Women-only passenger car
