= Hiddush (organization) =

Trans-denominational nonprofit promoting religious freedom in Israel

Hiddush (Hebrew: חִדּוּשׁ), meaning innovation, renewal; full name: "Hiddush – For Religious Freedom and Equality", is a trans-denominational non-profit organization founded in 2009 which aims to promote religious freedom and equality in Israel. The organization, a partnership between Israeli Jews and Jews from outside Israel, is headed by Jerusalem-based attorney and rabbi Uri Regev, former president of the World Union for Progressive Judaism, as its president and CEO, and American businessman Stanley P. Gold, member of the Reform Wilshire Boulevard Temple and former chairman of the board of the Jewish Federation of Greater Los Angeles.

Hiddush is supported by a number of prominent Jews, among them businessman Charles Bronfman, Harvard professor Alan Dershowitz, producer Norman Lear, authors Amos Oz and Letty Cottin Pogrebin, professor Amnon Rubinstein, and Gili Zivan of the Religious Kibbutz Movement.

== Goals ==
Supported by the Conservative, the Reconstructionist, and the Reform Judaism movements, Hiddush aims to change the existing religious power structure in Israel, with its Orthodox and ultra-Orthodox dominance, realizing the words of the Israeli Declaration of Independence, which states that, "The State of Israel ... will ensure complete equality of social and political rights to all its inhabitants irrespective of religion, race, or sex; it will guarantee freedom of religion, conscience, language, education, and culture".

Among the organization's stated goals are the legalization of civil as well as religious marriage and divorce, ensuring recognition for Conservative, Reconstructionist, and Reform marriages and conversions, full rights for rabbis of all Jewish denominations, providing equal funding for non-Orthodox religious services, and civic equality in education, employment, and military service. Hiddush also pledges to fight discrimination against women, and to demand that yeshivas meet requirements for teaching non-religious subjects. The organization advocates for freedom of religion and consciousness, but not necessarily a complete separation of religion and state.

According to Rabbi Regev, the social problems facing Israel are caused by the religious involvement in the state, including inequality in education, employment, and army service, discrimination against women, refusal of many ultra-Orthodox schools to implement the legal requirement for teaching mathematics, English, sciences, and civics, and the limitations on use of public transportation. Stanley Gold's concern is that the Israeli economy may be reduced to a third-world level within ten years, due to the fact that a quarter of Jewish students in Israel study in the ultra-Orthodox school system, where they often don't study English or science, if a drastic shift in the ultra-Orthodox school curriculum does not occur, and an increase in ultra-Orthodox people's participation in the workforce doesn't take place. 60 percent of ultra-Orthodox men in Israel study in yeshivas, and do not work, supporting their families solely with government stipends. Different studies have found that ultra-Orthodox men's avoidance of joining the Israeli job market costs Israel NIS 5 to 15 billion ($1.3 to 4 billion) annually.

== Activities ==
During its start-up year, Hiddush operated on a $500,000 budget and skeleton staff. It has a series of long-range projects, such as forming alliances with like-minded groups, using the social media in Israel and the Diaspora, publishing investigative media reports, legal challenges, "report cards" on the votes of Knesset members, and special outreach to Russian immigrants in Israel.

=== Religion and State Index ===
Hiddush conducts a "Religion and State Index" evaluated by public opinion surveys it commissions. The first survey of 1,200 adult Jewish Israelis, conducted by the Smith Research Institute in Summer 2009, shows that

- 83% support ensuring freedom of religion and conscience;
- 60% expressed support for a separation of religion and state, 82% of the secular public surveyed;
- 50% consider the tension between the ultra-Orthodox and secular populations as the most important or second in importance within Israeli society;
- 92% of secular Jews support abolishing the Orthodox monopoly on marriage; 61% of secular population and 70% of immigrants prefer to be married – and that their children would be married – in a non-Orthodox manner or to live together unmarried; 65% prefer to be married in an Orthodox manner; 69% expect the Orthodox monopoly on marriage to continue;
- 53% and 74% of the secular population (but only 47% of immigrants) support the recognition of an option for same-sex marriage or domestic partnership; 17% of ultra-Orthodox women, but 0% of ultra-Orthodox men, think that if civil marriages or domestic partnerships are recognized, they should also be open for gays and lesbians;
- 84% oppose military service exemptions for ultra-Orthodox yeshiva students;
- 75% support reducing government funding to yeshivas and large families, in order to create an incentive for ultra-Orthodox men to leave full-time yeshiva studies and join the workforce, including 49% of the religiously observant and 22% of the ultra-Orthodox public;
- 63% are disturbed by the influence of ultra-Orthodox political parties, 83% seculars and 74% immigrants;
- 66% think that rabbis in the public service, who receive government salaries, should not be involved in politics, and should refrain from publicly expressing political opinions, including 54% of the religious and 50% of the ultra-Orthodox population;
- 60% support ending the ultra-Orthodox monopoly on conversion to Judaism;
- 63% think that all Jewish denominations should be given equal status, 84% of the secular, 61% of the traditional population, and 79% of immigrants;
- 66% think that the State of Israel should take into consideration the views of Diaspora Jews in such matters as the Law of Return, conversion to Judaism, marriage, and religion-state relations;
- 80% support canceling or limiting gender-segregated Mehadrin bus lines;
- 62% support the operation of public transportation on Saturdays;
- 60% support the operation of shopping centers on Saturdays, 88% of secular population and 83% of immigrants.

Its latest survey of 800 adult Jewish Israelis, conducted by the Smith Research Institute in Summer 2010, shows that

- 59% oppose any religious legislation;
- 59% support the separation between religion and state, 84% of the secular public surveyed and the immigrants;
- 73% view the tension between the ultra-Orthodox and secular people as the most serious (49%) or the second most serious (24%) domestic conflict;
- 61% are in favor of recognizing non-Orthodox marriages, 90% of secular people and 92% of immigrants;
- 76% of the public support that ultra-Orthodox educational institutions should be obliged to implement the Ministry of Education's mandatory 2003 national curriculum (called "Liba", Hebrew acronym for "basic studies in state education"), including mathematics, English, sciences, and civics; 62% are in favor of eliminating financial support for schools which do not teach the "Liba" curriculum;
- 80% hold that admissions quotas for Sephardim in Ashkenazi educational institutions constitute ethnic discrimination; 73% oppose financing of institutions that practice ethnic discrimination policies;
- 75% support a reduction in the subsidies to yeshivas and families with five or more children, in order to encourage ultra-Orthodox men to enter the work force;
- 61% are opposed to the influence of the ultra-Orthodox political parties;
- 61% support breaking the Orthodox monopoly on conversion, and support state recognition of non-Orthodox conversion;
- 65% think that opinions of Diaspora Jewry should be taken into consideration;
- 70% support abolishing or reducing the gender-segregated public bus lines.

The studies show "strong support for a range of matters of religious freedom and equality amongst the general Israeli population. This suggests that mainstream Israelis, across the social and political spectrum, are open to fundamental change in the long-standing status quo agreements which have granted monopoly powers to the ultra-Orthodox political parties and chief rabbinate. Israelis seek a more free and egalitarian society, in which all citizens receive more equal status, both in rights and duties."

=== Research and Reports ===
In the beginning of 2013, Hiddush released several reports regarding the role of religion in Israeli politics. Several days following the Knesset elections on January 22, 2013, Hiddush released a report, conducted by the Smith Research Institute, which showed that 80% of the Jewish public in Israel support establishing a civil government coalition that will advance the agenda of religious freedom and equality. Within the survey, Hiddush also looked at voters' attitudes towards the role of religion in the next government coalition, and whether or not the ultra-Orthodox parties should be included in the coalition.

Specifically on whether or not the next government should prioritize an agenda based on civil issues, the report found that:

- 87% of Likud-Yisrael Beiteinu voters support a civil government.
- 99% of Yesh Atid voters are in support.
- 100% of HaTnuah, Labor, and Meretz voters are in support.
- 68% of Bayit HaYehudi voters support a civil government.
- 38% of Shas voters are in support.

The polling additionally found that 54% of Jewish voters think that the next government coalition should not include the ultra-Orthodox parties.

On February 7, 2013, Hiddush released an investigative report which showed that in 2010, NIS 1.05 billion was allocated to religious institutions through additional budget transfers. These transfers were carried out through the Knesset Finance Committee. In 2011, NIS 826 million were transferred to religious institutions, and exclusively went through the Finance Committee, which is chaired by ultra-Orthodox United Torah Judaism party member, Moshe Gafni.

== Freedom of Marriage World Map ==
In May 2013, Hiddush launched the Freedom of Marriage World Map. It is the first online resource to provide a global comparison of freedom of marriage. The interactive website features a color-coded map in black, grey, and white, representing the grading from 0-2.

- 45 countries around the world, 23% of the 194 countries examined, have severe restrictions on freedom of marriage (grade 0).

- In 56 countries (29%), there are partial restrictions on freedom of marriage (grade 1).

- Freedom of marriage or almost full freedom of marriage (grade 2) exists in almost half of the world's countries (93 countries, or 48%).

The research for the map found that almost every country in Europe and 75% of the Americas permit full or almost-full freedom of marriage. 73% (33 countries) of the countries that received "0" (severe restrictions) are Muslim and enforce Sharia law.

Israel received a "0" in the report. The strict religious monopoly on marriages in Israel results in hundreds of thousands of citizens who are denied the right of marriage altogether, and millions more who are deprived of the ability to choose a marriage ceremony that befits their beliefs.

The map's research was headed by Natasha Roth. The project was produced by Hiddush Spokesman, Miki Sokolovsky, and edited by Hiddush Vice President for Research and Information, Shahar Ilan. The map was designed and built by Lionways, Inc., with assistance from the New Israel Fund.

== See also ==
- Marriage in Israel
- Recognition of same-sex unions in Israel
- Chief Rabbinate of Israel
- Secularism in Israel
