= Interfaith marriage =

Marriage between spouses professing different religions

Interfaith marriage, sometimes called interreligious marriage or mixed marriage, is marriage between spouses professing and being legally part of different religions. Although interfaith marriages are often established as civil marriages, in some instances they may be established as a religious marriage. This depends on the religious doctrine of each of the two parties' religions; some prohibit interfaith marriage, and among others there are varying degrees of permissibility.

Several major religions are silent on the issue, and still others allow it with requirements for ceremony and custom. For ethno-religious groups, resistance to interfaith marriage may be a form of self-segregation in order to preserve the cultural identity and religious beliefs among members of the same group, while interfaith marriage at times has been at times seen as a form of resisting boundaries established by religious and social norms. In an interfaith marriage, each partner typically adheres to their own religion. One issue which can arise in such unions is the choice of faith in which to raise the children.

== Legal status ==
=== Human rights ===
According to Article 16 of the Universal Declaration of Human Rights, men and women who have attained the age of majority have the right to marry "without any limitation due to race, nationality or religion". Although most of Article 16 is incorporated verbatim in Article 23 of the International Covenant on Civil and Political Rights, the references to religious and racial limitations is omitted. Article 17, clause two, of the American Convention on Human Rights says that all men and women have the right to marry, subject to the conditions of domestic law "insofar as such conditions do not affect the principle of nondiscrimination established in this Convention."

=== United States ===
According to a study conducted by the Pew Research Center (2015), interfaith marriage has become increasingly common in the United States during the past decades. While of marriages performed before 1960, 81% of marriages were between spouses from the same religious denomination, 11% were between spouses of different Christian denominations, 5% were between a Christian and a religiously unaffiliated spouse, and 3% were other mixed forms of interfaith marriages, the corresponding figures for marriages performed in the period of 2010–2014 were 61%, 15%, 18% and 6%. Interfaith marriages are least common among Hindus, Mormons, and Muslims, and most common among religiously unaffiliated people, mainline Protestants, and Jews.

Joan Boocock Lee, an Episcopalian British-American actress who was married to the agnostic Jewish-American comic book creator Stan Lee until her death, stated that the couple faced difficulty adopting a child in the mid-20th century United States. Since the 1960s, American composers have written wedding music for use during interfaith marriage ceremonies, most notably John Serry Sr. With this in mind, Serry devoted the remaining thirty-five years of his professional career to the performance of wedding music and liturgical music of the Jewish and Roman Catholic faiths as a freelance organist at the Interfaith Chapel of Long Island University C W Post Campus in Brookville, New York (1968–2002). As more rabbis sought to unite couples of different faiths without first requiring conversions in the 1960s and 1970s, he collaborated with several clergymen of both the Jewish and Roman Catholic religious traditions, including Rabbi Nathaniel Schwartz and the Rev. John Heinlein.

=== India ===
Interfaith marriage is controversial in some areas, especially disapproval of relationships between Hindus and Muslims. Advertisements and films depicting Hindu-Muslim relationships have attracted condemnation and legal action. Hindu-Muslim couples have experienced harassment, including posting personal details on social media. In 2020 and 2021, several Indian states with BJP governments passed laws prohibiting forced conversions, and requiring notification of intent to marry and a waiting period, and allowing anyone to object to the union. Interfaith marriages have been taken as an inherent indication of a forced conversion, despite some individuals stating they will not be converting in order to marry. Fearing vigilante violence and after facing long delays and uncooperative lawyers and government officials, some couples have fled to other states to get married, often losing their jobs. In August 2021, the Gujarat High Court limited the scope of that state's law on the grounds of freedom of religion.

According to scholar Tamalapakula (2019), within the context of interfaith marriage, the social dimension of the caste system in India should be heavily considered. In various instances in her study of interfaith and inter-caste marriages, arguably the dynamics of class and gender play a pivotal role in the development of social relationships between families of interfaith and inter-caste marriages. In one of the used examples, in the marriages between Brahmin women and the Dalit men, the men are often viewed poorly by Brahmin relatives and isolate from their Dalit relatives to avoid association, to attain a similar status to the Brahmin women which is socially seen as ¨pure¨ compared to the Dalit man.

Still, marriage is often seen as a means for the improvement of social status by Dalit men and even as a means of transcending the boundaries of caste-based discrimination and constraints for both men and women. Yet, for Dalit women, Tamalapakula argues that given that the higher castes would never accept them to be as the legal wife of a Brahmin man and as they are seen as sexually exploited from their Dalit relatives, it is another example how interfaith and inter-caste marriages are essentially tied through structural inequalities surrounding gender and class. Thus, while interfaith marriage is seen as partly controversial and legally acceptable, it is part of a larger power dynamic that crosses between class and gender within Dalit and Brahmin castes.

=== Saudi Arabia ===
Religion in Saudi Arabia is dominated and heavily influenced by the Salafi brand of Sunni Islam and its Wahhabi ideology, a political and religious ideology named after Muhammad ibn Abd al-Wahhab, an 18th-century Sunni Muslim preacher, scholar, and theologian from the Najd region in central Arabia, founder of the Islamic revivalist and reformist movement known as Wahhabism. Hence, religious rights are restricted both for Saudi citizens and foreigners that reside in the country. Public celebration or advocacy of any other religion is generally prohibited.

=== Israel ===
In Israel, marriages are performed by delegated religious authorities. As such, most interfaith marriages are de facto not performed without a recognized conversion. This system is largely a continuation of the Ottoman Millet system in which different communities were allowed to control their own internal affairs. In the Druze religion there is no marriage between Druze and non-Druze and in traditional Judaism there is no marriage between a Jew and a Gentile. Thus, interfaith marriages in which one of the spouses is Jewish or Druze, are not recognized by the state. Muslim Qadis sometimes perform marriage ceremonies of a Muslim with a Jewish or Christian woman, and Christian priests in special cases perform marriage ceremonies of a Christian or Christian woman with a non-Christian, and in other cases they are recognized retrospectively, and in any case the state recognizes these marriages. All interfaith marriages performed in other countries are recognized. Hitbolelut, meaning assimilation in Hebrew, is a term used mainly to refer with prejudice to Jews who marry outside of the Jewish people. The term has strong resonance in Israel and with many Jews worldwide as marrying outside historically meant leaving the Jewish community to be absorbed by the dominant culture.

Perhaps because of these norms, interfaith marriages between a Jewish individual and a non-Jewish individual are extremely rare in Israel. One Pew Research Center study, conducted in 2014–2015, indicated that only about two percent of Jewish individuals were part of an interfaith marriage. In addition, about 97 percent of Jews in the same stated that they would be not be completely comfortable with their child marrying a Muslim while 89 percent expressed similar views when asked about a hypothetical marriage to a Christian.

=== Lebanon ===
Depending on the sectarian affiliation of the partners, there are different legal frameworks governing interfaith marriages. As secular civil marriage is not possible in Lebanon, the religious laws of the 18 recognised sects must be followed for marriage. This leads to different restrictions, such as Christians, who cannot marry non-Christians in a church, or Muslim women, who cannot marry Christian or Druze men unless one of the partners converts to the religion of the other. For Lebanese couples, an option to circumvent conversion is to have a civil marriage in Cyprus. Based on a comparison made between the 2011 and the 2018 electoral registration records, a slow but steady change in mixed marriages is measured. The data shows an increase in the percentage of Lebanese marriages that were interreligious without conversion, from 0.9% in 2011, to 1.31% in 2018. In general interfaith marriages represent between 2 percent and 5 percent of all marriages among Lebanese.

=== Social and family dynamics ===
Anthropologist Lara Deeb uses 'mixed marriage' to describe marriages between members of Lebanon's major religious communities: Muslims, Christians and Druzes. While distinguishing these from 'intersecterian' marriages, such as Sunni, Shi'i marriages or marriages between members of different Christian denominations. In her research, family responses to mixed relationships ranged from acceptance to sustained opposition and shunning. Objections were not necessarily based only on religious belief, as they could also concern social class, family reputation and expectations about the prospective spouse's family background.

Deeb argues that mixed marriage has become increasingly accepted in Lebanon. However, she also observes increasing disagreement between people who accept such marriages and those who oppose them.

Lara Deeb's work also shows that interfaith marriage in Lebanon is not experienced the same way by everyone. Gender makes a big difference in who has to bare which consequences of interfaith marriage. Women often play down their own faith or accept that their husband's religion will shape how the children are raised and how the family appears in public. Family conflicts caused by interfaith marriage also weighs more heavily on women. They are usually expected to deal with the emotional labour in the family. Besides, there is a difference in how parents react on interfaith marriage. Fathers tend to worry most about the family's reputation, while mothers are likely to receive criticism from relatives, friends and neighbours. Since a mixed marriage challenges the authority of fathers in particular, daughters are more likely to be cut off from their families, while sons remain the link in the family line. As a result, women are more careful about risking their family ties.

Besides, the law makes these inequalities worse. In Lebanon, children belong to their father's sect, that makes women marrying outside their community more vulnerable if custody is disputed. Mothers are never recognized as legal guardians of their children. If the husband dies, guardianship goes to his closest male relative. A widow from a different sect has a harder time defending her custody.

== By religion ==
=== Abrahamic religions ===
==== Baháʼí Faith ====
According to the Baháʼí Faith, all religions are inspired by God and interfaith marriage is permitted. A Baháʼí ceremony should be performed with the non-Baháʼí rite (or ceremony). If both ceremonies are performed, the non-Baháʼí ceremony should not invalidate the Baháʼí ceremony; the Baháʼí partner remains a Baháʼí, and is not adopting the religion of the other partner in the ceremony. The Baháʼí partner should also abstain from vows (or statements) committing them to a declaration of faith in another religion or that are contrary to the principles of the Baháʼí Faith. The two ceremonies should be performed on the same day; their order is not important. The Baháʼí ceremony may be performed in the place of worship of the other religion if it is afforded respect equal to the non-Baháʼí ceremony and is clearly distinct from the non-Baháʼí ceremony.

==== Christianity ====
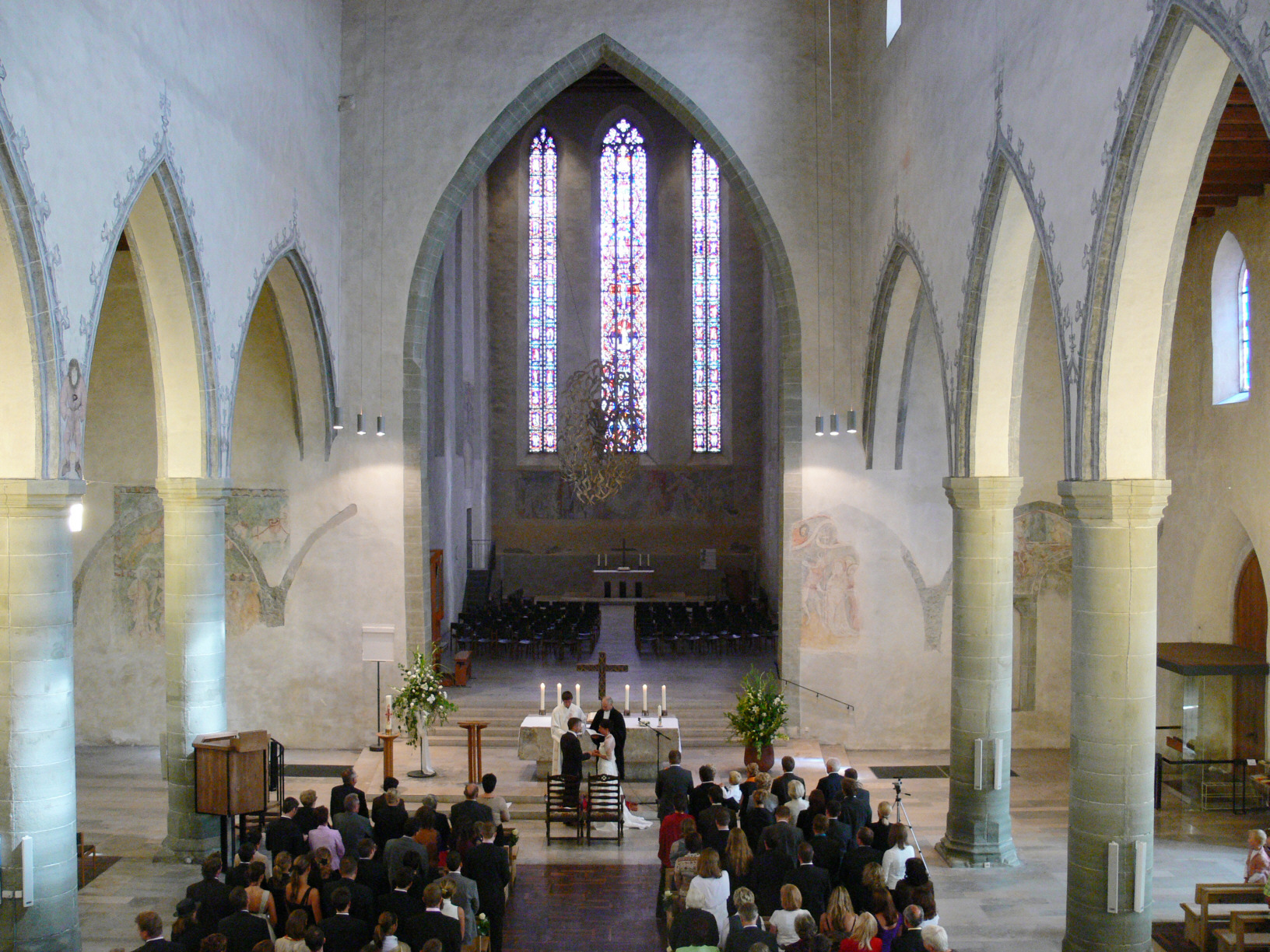
A Lutheran pastor in Germany marries a young couple in a Protestant church.

In Christianity, an interfaith marriage is a marriage between a Christian and a non-Christian (e.g. a wedding between a Christian man and a Jewish woman, or between a Christian woman and a Muslim man); it is to be distinguished between an interdenominational marriage in which two baptized Christians belonging to two different Christian denominations marry (e.g. a wedding between a Lutheran Christian and a Catholic Christian). Almost all Christian denominations permit interdenominational marriages, though with respect to interfaith marriage, many Christian denominations caution against it, citing verses of the Christian Bible such as 2 Corinthians 6:14–15, while certain Christian denominations have made allowances for interfaith marriage, which is referenced in 1 Corinthians 7:14–15, verses where Saint Paul addresses originally non-Christian couples in which one of the spouses became a Christian after the marriage had taken place. The consensus of the early Church Fathers was that "interreligious marriage undermined the ecclesiological integrity of the Christian community" though as Christianity rapidly spread in the Roman Empire, cases would arise among non-Christian couples in which one person converted to Christianity; Apostolic Tradition, an early Christian Church Order, references such an interfaith couple in its instructions on Christian prayer at the seven fixed prayer times and the ablutions preceding them, stating:

Around midnight rise and wash your hands with water and pray. If you are married, pray together. But if your spouse is not yet baptized, go into another room to pray, and then return to bed. Do not hesitate to pray, for one who has been joined in marital relations is not impure.

The early Christian Council of Elvira prohibited interreligious marriage "no matter how few eligible men there are, for such marriages lead to the adultery of the soul." The Church of the East, in the Council of Seleucia-Ctesiphon in AD 410, ruled that "Christian women should not marry across religious boundaries" though it allowed for Christian men to marry "women of all nations" (neshē men kul 'ammin) in order that Christian men would "instruct them in the ways of Christianity." The cultural context at the time was that a couple's children would follow the religion of the father. The Synod of Elvira forbade Christian parents who permitted their daughters to marry nonbelievers to receive Holy Communion, "even at the time of death".

In the Presbyterian Church (USA), the local church congregation is tasked with supporting and including the interfaith couple in the life of the Church, "help[ing] parents make and live by commitments about the spiritual nurture of their children", and being inclusive of the children of the interfaith couple. The pastor is to be available to help and counsel the interfaith couple in their life journey.

The Catholic Church recognizes as sacramental, (1) the marriages between two baptized Protestants or between two baptized Orthodox Christians, as well as (2) marriages between baptized non-Catholic Christians and Catholic Christians, although in the latter case, consent from the diocesan bishop must be obtained, with this termed "permission to enter into a mixed marriage". To illustrate (1), for example, "if two Lutherans marry in the Lutheran Church in the presence of a Lutheran minister, the Catholic Church recognizes this as a valid sacrament of marriage." On the other hand, although the Catholic Church recognizes marriages between two non-Christians or those between a Catholic Christian and a non-Christian, these are not considered to be sacramental, and in the latter case, the Catholic Christian must seek permission from their bishop for the marriage to occur; this permission is known as "dispensation from disparity of cult".

In Methodist Christianity, the 2014 Book of Discipline of the Allegheny Wesleyan Methodist Connection discourages interfaith marriages, stating "Many Christians have married unconverted persons. This has produced bad effects; they have either been hindered for life, or have turned back to perdition." Though the United Methodist Church authorizes its clergy to preside at interfaith marriages, it notes that 2 Corinthians 6:14 has been interpreted "as at least an ideal if not an absolute ban on such [interfaith] marriages as an issue of scriptural faithfulness, if not as an issue of Christian survival." At the same time, for those already in an interfaith marriage (including cases in which there is a non-Christian couple and one party converts to Christianity after marriage), the Church notes that Saint Paul "addresses persons married to unbelievers and encourages them to stay married (see 1 Corinthians 7:12–16)." The Wesleyan Holiness Association of Churches teaches that "For a Christian to marry an unbeliever is unscriptural. If one does marry an unconverted party and trouble follows, he/she cannot blame God for his/her wrongdoing but must expect to pay the penalty, for the marriage covenant is morally binding so long as both live and, therefore, may not be dissolved at will (1 Corinthians 7:39)."

==== Islam ====
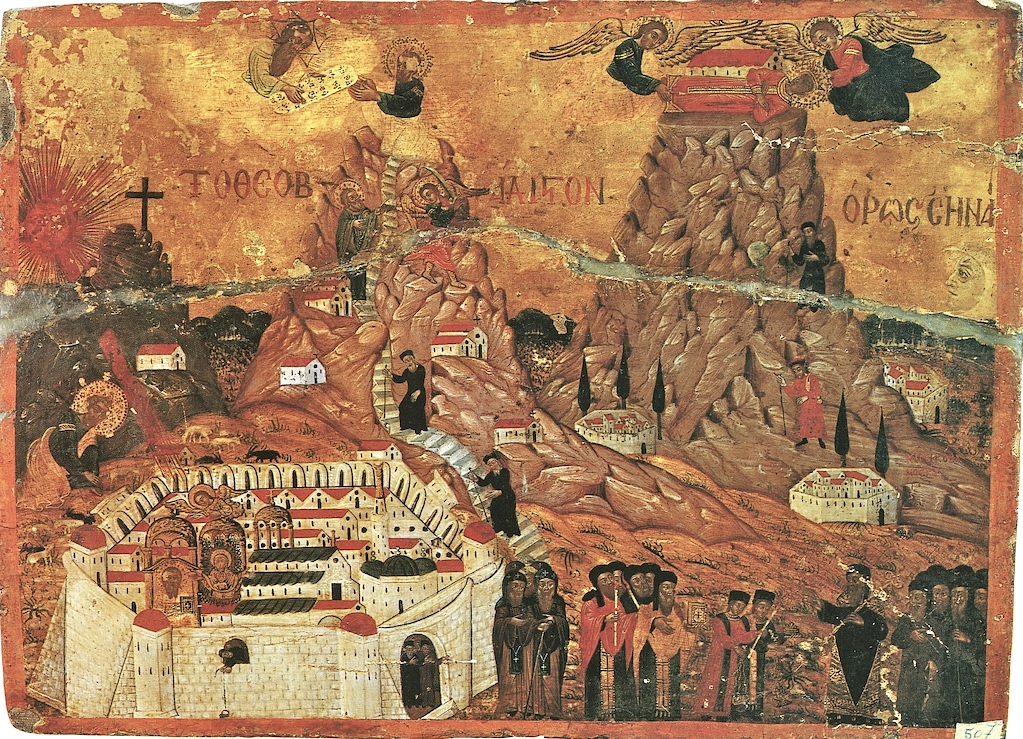
Interfaith marriage between Muslims and Christians is discussed in the Ashtiname of Muhammad, a treaty that was recorded between Muhammad and the abbots of Saint Catherine's Monastery, which is depicted in this icon.

While the legality of interfaith marriage varies in contemporary Muslim-majority countries, in traditional Islamic culture and traditional Islamic law Muslim women are forbidden from marrying Non-Muslim men, whereas Muslim men are permitted to marry Christian or Jewish women. It is lawful for Muslim men to marry Jewish or Christian women but not a polytheist woman (Quran 5:5). In the case of a Muslim-Christian marriage, which is to be contracted only after permission from the Christian party, the Christian spouse is not to be prevented from attending church for prayer and worship, according to the Ashtiname of Muhammad, a treaty between Muslims and Christians recorded between Muhammad and Saint Catherine's Monastery.

On the other hand, according to the traditional understanding of interfaith marriage in Islam, Muslim women are forbidden from intermarrying with Non-Muslim men based on the interpretations of different Muslim scholars regarding the Islamic law. The Quran states:

Do not marry polytheist woman until she believes; a slave believing woman is better than polytheist women though she allures you; Do not marry (your girls) to polytheist man until he believes: A man slave who believes is better than a polytheist man, even though he allures you. They do (but) beckon you to the Fire. But God beckons by His Grace to the Garden (of bliss) and forgiveness, and makes His Signs clear to mankind: so that they may understand.

— Quran 2:221

O ye who believe! When there come to you believing women refugees, examine (and test) them: God knows best as to their Faith: if ye ascertain that they are Believers, then send them not back to the Unbelievers. They are not lawful wives for the Unbelievers, nor are the Unbelievers lawful husbands for them.

— Quran 60:10

In some societies outside the traditional dar al-islam, interfaith marriages between Muslims and Non-Muslims are not uncommon, including marriages that contradict the historic Sunni understanding of ijmāʿ (the consensus of fuqāha) as to the bounds of legitimacy. The tradition of reformist and progressive Islam, however, permits marriage between Muslim women and non-Muslim men; Islamic scholars opining this view include Muslim feminist Shehnaz Haqqani, Khaleel Mohammed, Daayiee Abdullah, and Hassan Al-Turabi, among others. ʿUmar ibn al-Khaṭṭāb (634–644) denied interfaith marriage to Muslim men during his command of the Ummah.

Many Muslim-majority countries allow interfaith marriages to Christian or Jewish women but not to Christian or Jewish men. In Lebanon for example, there is no civil personal status law. Conventionally, marriages are performed according to the sect the spouses belong to. Turkey allows marriages between Muslim women and Non-Muslim men through secular laws. In Tunisia since 16 September 2017, Muslim women can lawfully marry any man of any faith, or of none. In Malaysia, a Non-Muslim must convert to Islam in order to marry a Muslim, and the offspring of such unions are automatically Muslims.

Canadian Muslim scholar Ahmad Kutty has expressed disapproval of all interfaith marriages, citing the example of ʿUmar. According to Canadian Islamic teacher Bilal Philips, the verse permitting Muslim men to marry Non-Muslim women is no longer valid for several reasons (including its misinterpretation). Canadian Islamic scholar Shabir Ally has also said that it is makruh for a Muslim man to marry outside his religion. The movement of progressive Islam permits marriage between Muslim women and Non-Muslim men; Members opining this view include Islamic scholars such as Muslim feminist Shehnaz Haqqani, Khaleel Mohammed, Daayiee Abdullah, and Hassan Al-Turabi, among others.

==== Judaism ====
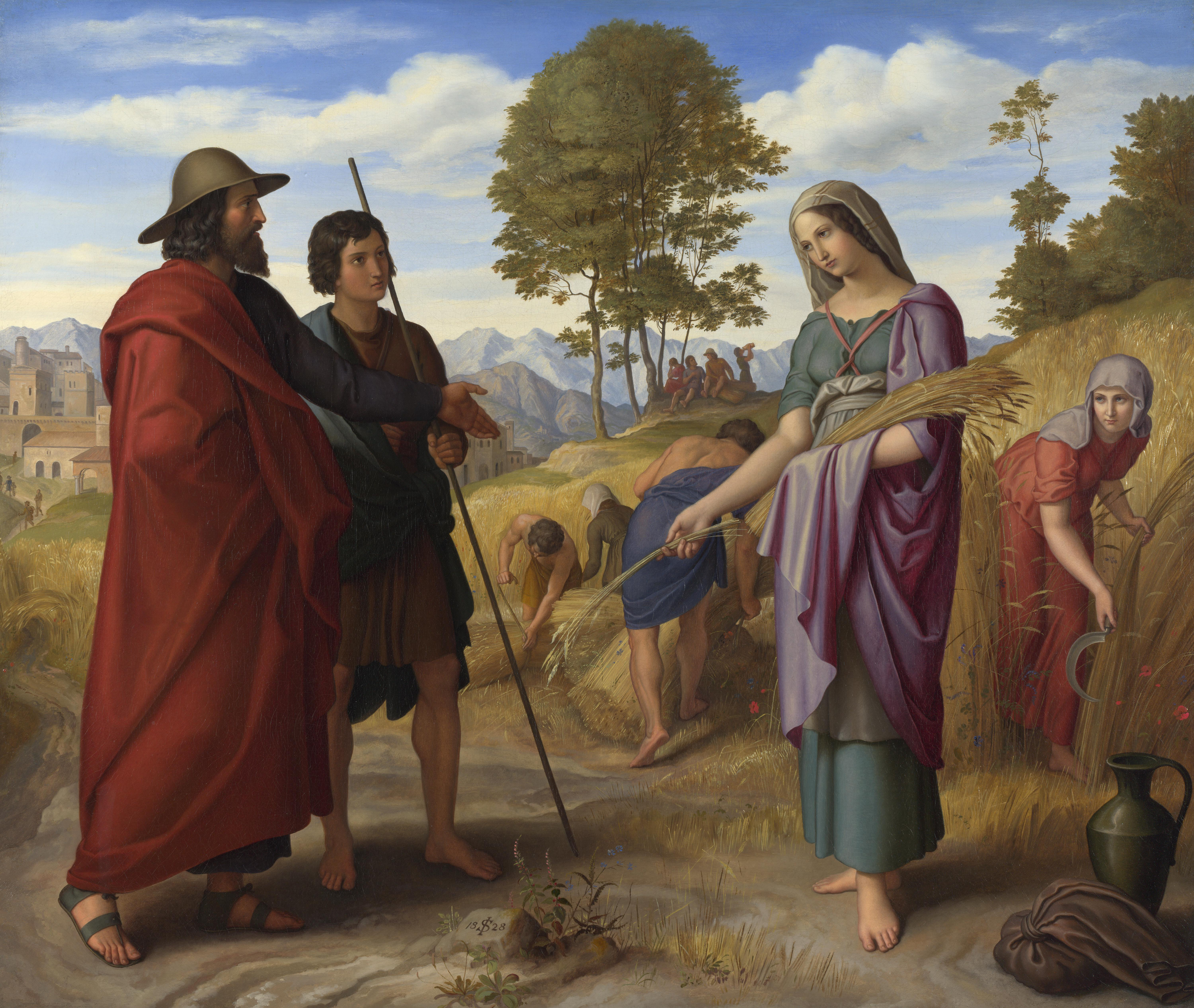
In the Hebrew Bible, Ruth was a Moabite woman who married an Israelite man, Mahlon. She is the person after whom the Book of Ruth is named.

Interfaith marriage in Judaism was historically viewed with disfavor among rabbinical Jewish leaders, and it remains a controversial topic to this day. The Talmud and poskim prohibit non-Jews to marry Jews, and discuss when the prohibition is from the Torah and when it is rabbinical. In 1236, Moses of Coucy encouraged Jewish men who had married Christian or Muslim women to divorce them. In 1844, the reformed Rabbinical Conference of Brunswick permitted Jews to marry "any adherent of a monotheistic religion" if children of the marriage were raised Jewish. This conference was controversial; one of its resolutions called on members to abolish the Kol Nidre prayer, which opens the Yom Kippur service. One member of the conference later changed his opinion, becoming an opponent of intermarriage.

Traditional Judaism does not consider marriage between a Jew by birth and a convert to Judaism as intermarriage; Biblical passages which apparently support intermarriage, such as that of Joseph to Asenath and Ruth to Boaz, were regarded by classical rabbis as having occurred after the non-Jewish spouse had converted. Some still considered Canaanites forbidden to marry even after their conversion to Judaism, although this did not necessarily apply to their children.

Orthodox Judaism refuses to accept intermarriage and tries to avoid facilitating them. Conservative Judaism does not sanction intermarriage but encourages acceptance of the non-Jewish spouse by the family in the hope that such acceptance will lead to the spouse's conversion to Judaism. In December 2014, the United Synagogue of Conservative Judaism's United Synagogue Youth controversially modified a binding rule that its leaders would not date non-Jews, replacing it with a "recogni[tion of] the importance of dating within the Jewish community."

Reform and Reconstructionist denominations of Judaism do not generally regard the authority of classical rabbis; many rabbis from these denominations are willing to officiate at interfaith marriages, although some try to persuade intermarried couples to raise their children as Jews. In 1870, some Reform Jews published the opinion that intermarriage is prohibited.

In 2015 the Reconstructionist Rabbinical College voted to accept rabbinical students in interfaith relationships, making Reconstructionist Judaism the first major movement within Judaism to allow rabbis to have relationships with non-Jewish partners. Humanistic Judaism is a nontheistic alternative in contemporary Jewish life, defining Judaism as the cultural and historical experience of the Jewish people. The Society for Humanistic Judaism answers the question, "Is intermarriage contributing to the demise of Judaism?" on its website: "Intermarriage is the positive consequence of a free and open society. If the Jewish community is open, welcoming, embracing, and pluralistic, we will encourage more people to identify with the Jewish people rather than fewer. Intermarriage could contribute to the continuity of the Jewish people."

During the early 19th century, intermarriage was relatively rare; less than 0.1% of the Jews of Algeria, for example, practiced exogamy. Since the early 20th century, rates of Jewish intermarriage have increased. In the United States from 1996 to 2001, nearly half (47 percent) of marriages involving Jews were intermarriages with non-Jewish partners (a similar proportion—44 percent—as in the early 20th century in New South Wales).

In Israel, the religious authorities, which are the only entities authorized to perform weddings in Israel, can only perform marriages within the confines of whatever religion they are a religious figure for. Therefore, interfaith couples can usually be legally married in Israel only if one of the partners converts to the religion of the other. For this reason, interfaith couples from Israel and Lebanon often travel to Cyprus to be legally wed.

=== Indian religions ===
==== Buddhism ====
Buddhists are allowed to marry people of different religions. There is no Buddhist doctrine that prohibits interfaith marriage. In fact, interfaith marriages are quite common in various Buddhist cultures. While some individuals or communities may have personal preferences or cultural norms, there is no formal Buddhist rule against marrying someone of another faith.

Buddhism does not have a central authority or a formal set of rules that explicitly forbids interfaith marriage. Instead, it places emphasis on individual spiritual development and personal understanding, rather than prescribing whom one should or should not marry. While there is no universal Buddhist stance on the matter, cultural variations exist, and some Buddhist communities may have social customs or expectations surrounding marriage, though these are not rooted in religious doctrine. In fact, some Buddhists may view interfaith marriage as an opportunity for personal growth and a chance to learn from different perspectives. It is also important to consider that in certain countries, especially those with different dominant religions like Islam, there may be legal requirements or restrictions regarding interfaith marriage, but these are based on national laws or religious customs rather than Buddhist teachings.

In some countries, laws or customs may exist regarding interfaith marriage, but these are separate from Buddhist religious law. For example, in some Muslim-majority countries, there may be specific legal requirements or restrictions for interfaith marriages involving a Muslim partner.

==== Hinduism ====
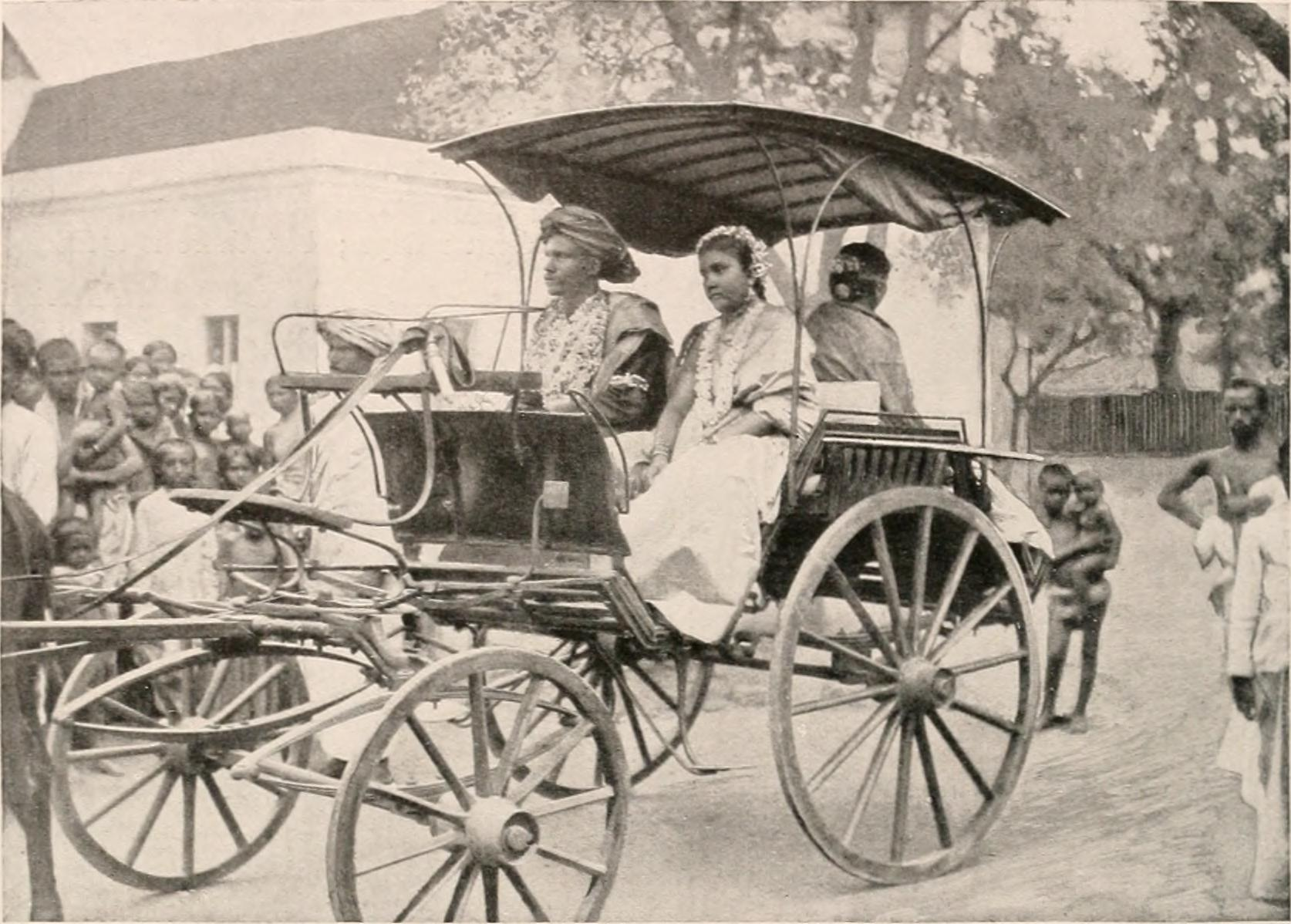
Photograph of a bride and bridegroom of the Shudra caste in a horse-drawn vehicle (1908)

In Hinduism, sacred texts like the Vedas do not have any views on interfaith marriages by differentiating between people of different religions. This is because there was no other known religion in ancient India during their composition. Ancient Indian Law books like the Manusmriti, Yajnavalkya Smriti, and the Parashara Smriti speak of marriage rules among various kula and gotra, i.e. marriage outside of the Hindu caste system (varṇa). According to the caste system, marriage is normally between two individuals of the same varṇa. In ancient times, marriages between men of higher birth and women of lower birth (anuloma) was allowed, but marriages between men of lower birth and women of higher birth (pratiloma) were frowned upon.

==== Sikhism ====
Despite some gurdwaras allowing weddings between a Sikh and a non-Sikh, the vast majority oppose it. As per the 1945 Sikh Rehat Maryada (Code of Conduct), an interfaith anand karaj is not allowed within the Sikh faith. The 10th Sikh Guru had indicated within The 52 Hukams of Guru Gobind Singh that "a Sikh’s daughter must be married to a Sikh". In 2014, the Sikh Council in the United Kingdom developed a consistent approach towards marriages in gurdwaras where one partner is not of Sikh origin, following a two-year consultation with Gurdwara Sahib Committees, Sikh organizations, and individuals. The resulting guidelines were approved by the General Assembly of the Sikh Council in the United Kingdom on 11 October 2014, and state that gurdwaras are encouraged to ensure that both parties to an Anand Karaj wedding ceremony are Sikhs, but that where a couple chooses to undertake a civil marriage they should be offered the opportunity to hold an Ardas, Sukhmani Sahib Path, Akhand Path, or other service to celebrate their marriage in the presence of family and friends. Some gurdwaras permit mixed marriages, which has led to controversy.

==== Zoroastrianism ====
Zoroastrians in the Indian subcontinent disapprove of and discourage interfaith marriages. When a female adherent marries a partner from another religion, they go through the risk of not being able to enter the Agyaris and Atash Behrams. In the past, their partner and children were forbidden from entering Zoroastrian religious buildings; this is often still observed. Alternatively in a few cases such as that of Suzanne RD Tata, the non-Zoroastrian spouse has been allowed to convert Zoroastrianism by undergoing the navjote ritual. Interfaith marriages may skew Zoroastrian demographics, since the number of adherents is low.

=== Serer religion ===
In orthodox Serer religion (an ethno-religious faith), interfaith and interracial marriages are forbidden. Banishment and disinheritance may be levied against a Serer who disobeys the law. The Serer-Noon (a sub-group of the Serer people) adhere strongly to this teaching.

== See also ==
- Auto-segregation
- Ecumenism
- Endogamy
- Flirty Fishing
- Interdenominational marriage
- Interracial marriage
- Love jihad
- Multiple religious belonging
