= Stay of exit =

Israeli court order preventing individuals from leaving the country

A stay of exit or no exit order (Hebrew: צו עיכוב יציאה מן הארץ Tzav ikuv yetzia min ha'aretz, or simply Tzav ikuv) is a type of court order issued by an Israeli court. It is used to prevent an individual from leaving the country, such as an active-duty Israel Defense Forces soldier, a person infected with COVID-19, or any Israeli citizen or foreigner who has an outstanding debt, such as child support.

Human rights activists have estimated that between 500,000 and 1 million people, including hundreds of foreign nationals, are being prevented from leaving Israel due to the stay of exit. Some of these activists have criticised the order in front of the United Nations Committee on Economic, Social and Cultural Rights.

== Background ==
Freedom of movement is acknowledged as a fundamental human right in one of Israel's Basic Laws. Specifically, the law guarantees that all persons are free to leave Israel, and that every Israel national has the right of entry into the country from abroad.

However, this right is regularly cancelled by the court system. As a result of the security situation due to the ongoing Israeli–Palestinian conflict, laws were enacted restricting Palestinian freedom of movement, both within the occupied territories and through border control. Israelis are forbidden from entering Area A in the West Bank.

== History ==
Israel's leaders needed a mechanism to discourage desertion and draft-dodging in the Israel Defense Forces. A stay of exit order issued by a court prevents an active-duty soldier from leaving the country. It has also been issued, beginning in 2020, to people infected with the COVID-19 virus. This included people suspected of having had contact with carriers of the virus.

Over time, the order has become known for its use as a mechanism to enforce debt collection in cases where officials suspect that the debtor might flee the country. An outstanding balance of as little as US$100 can trigger a stay of exit. The order bolsters a little-known divorce law that requires Israeli citizens, as well as foreign or dual-nationals who were only in Israel temporarily, to pay the full child support of their dependents up until the age of 18 in one lump sum before being allowed to leave the country. Barring that, the arrears must be paid in monthly installments, with each missed payment resulting in a jail sentence of up to 21 days. The only way to get a stay of exit rescinded is by contacting the specific agency responsible for issuing the order.

It is not known exactly how many people are being affected by the stay of exit due to scant data being released to the public by officials. The Coalition of the Children and Families in Israel (CCF) estimated that the number of people being prevented from leaving the country was anywhere between 500,000 and 1 million. Through a conversation with British Embassy officials in Tel Aviv, British journalist and CCF activist Marianne Azizi inferred that probably hundreds of Australian nationals were being detained in Israel due to the order. Specifically, the officials informed her that 100 British nationals per month were seeking the embassy's help in getting a stay of exit rescinded.

In December 2018, hazzan and performer Dudu Fisher was subject to a stay of exit due to being involved in bankruptcy proceedings. However, he was permitted by the court to leave Israel for two days in order to perform at a concert in Vienna, after depositing ₪250,000 ($80,000) collateral with a special assets manager via a third party. In 2021, it was reported that an Australian man who was divorced from his Israeli wife was detained from leaving the country in 2013, with the stay of exit being in force until 31 December 9999, or until he paid $3 million in child support arrears.

== Travel advisories ==
The US State Department has issued an advisory to US nationals traveling to the country, warning that the Israeli authorities

actively exercise their authority to bar certain individuals, including non-residents, from leaving the country until debts or other legal claims against them are resolved.

Furthermore, it added that the US Embassy

is unable to cancel the debt of a US citizen or guarantee their departure from Israel when they face a bar from leaving the country until debts are resolved.

== Criticism ==
In a 2013 Times of Israel blog, Adam Herscu described the stay of exit as being "draconian and excessively discriminatory against men". Filmmaker Sorin Luca, producer of the 2019 documentary No Exit Order, said that once an Israeli woman succeeds in getting a stay of exit over her husband, he can then be imprisoned by the court system. Luca claimed that the authorities do not take into consideration the husband's earning capacity, and that they are required to forfeit up to 100% or more of their salaries.

In March 2019, Azizi testified in front of the United Nations Committee on Economic, Social and Cultural Rights about the human rights violations she maintained were a direct result of the stay of exit, saying that "... the lives of over 2,000 fathers in suicide is a high price". She said that Israelis do not report human rights violations for fear of "consequences", such as some activists having had their children taken away from them. Attorney Mickey Givati, who was authorised by the British Embassy to help foreigners exit Israel, testified that tracking devices had been placed inside his vehicle, home and phone, and that his children were illegally placed in a shelter.
