= List of mass stabbing incidents (2010–2019) =

This is a list of mass stabbings that took place in the 2010s. It includes incidents in which there were at least three casualties (killed or injured).

== 2010 ==
=== Amity, Maine, U.S (June 2010) ===
On June 22, 2010, 55-year-old Jeffery Ryan, his 10-year-old son Jesse, and a friend, 30-year-old Jason Dehahn, were found stabbed to death in Amity, Maine. A suspect was soon found from evidence at the scene. The suspect, 20-year-old Thayne Ormsby, was connected to the victims through an acquaintance. The police arrested him, and he confessed he stabbed the victims to death with a 7-inch combat knife. His reasoning behind it was Ryan being a supposed drug dealer. Ormsby was sent to trial in 2012, where the jury rejected an insanity defense, and was convicted of the crime and sentenced to three life sentences without parole.

=== Staten Island, New York, U.S (July 2010) ===
On July 22, 2010, police and firefighters responded to a house fire at Port Richmond, Staten Island. There, firefighters found the bodies of 32-year-old Leisa Jones, and three of her four children, 14-year-old C.J., 10-year-old-Brittany, and 7-year-old Melonie, deceased. One child, 2-year-old Jermaine Sinclair, was alive when firefighters pulled him from the home, but he died at the hospital from smoke inhalation. On autopsy, C.J., Brittany, and Melonie were found to have had their throats slashed. A razor had been located on the scene near C.J.'s body. From there, police had a theory that C.J. had killed his family before committing suicide, with his history of setting fires proving their theory. However, Leisa was later found to have killed her family; the older children died from the throat cuts before the fire started and there was a charred note saying sorry. The handwriting in the note matched Leisa's writing in her diary. A motive wasn't positively found, but it likely stemmed from the financial situation Leisa faced, causing her to commit the murders. It is considered one of the worst tragedies in modern Staten Island's history.

== 2011 ==
=== Moscow, Russia (December 2011) ===
On 9 December, a 27-year-old mentally ill man killed three people and injured nine in a street after being refused prescription drugs at a nearby pharmacy.

== 2013 ==
=== Etajima, Japan (March 2013) ===
On 14 March 2013, Chinese exchange student and intern Chen Shuangxi attacked his co-workers at the Kawaguchi Suisan fish-processing firm in Etajima, Hiroshima. Two people were killed and seven others were injured. Chen attacked his co-workers with a shovel and a knife. Nobuyuki Kawaguchi, 55, the president of the Kawaguchi Suisan oyster farm, and co-worker Masako Hashishita, 68, were killed in the attack. One man and five women were injured. According to Chen, he had felt mistreated at his workplace, believing his co-workers were talking badly of him, saying that Kawaguchi frequently "belittled" him. He had called in sick the day of the attack and attacked others when Kawaguchi reprimanded him outside his room. As a result, the act was deemed not premeditated and the result of "loneliness and miscommunication due to a language barried". In 2015, Chen was sentenced to life imprisonment.

The stabbings caused controversy over the foreign trainee program in Japan, after it was revealed that Chen had a farming background rather than previous experience in fishing. Additionally, other scandals regarding mistreatment of foreign workers by Japanese businesses were revealed, including two deaths.

=== Carahue, Chile (May 2013) ===
On 25 May 2013, Juan Rodríguez Llancapán murdered 5 people, among them his wife and three children, by stabbing three of them with a knife, strangling another, and beating one person to death.

== 2014 ==
=== Edmonton, Canada (February 2014) ===
On 28 February 2014, 2 people were killed and 4 others were injured in a stabbing spree in a distribution centre. The perpetrator was arrested.

=== Changsha, China (March 2014) ===
On 14 March 2014, during an argument between two groups of Uyghur street merchants, one vendor fatally stabbed another man. The attacker fled the scene and killed four uninvolved passersby before being shot dead by police.

=== Beijing, China, (March 2014) ===
On 27 March 2014, 6 people were stabbed to death in a family property row.

=== Guangzhou, China (May 2014) ===
On Tuesday, 6 May 2014, at least six people were injured in a knife attack in Guangzhou. At least one suspect was shot and detained by authorities. It was believed by some witnesses that about four suspects were involved, they were clad in white clothes, wearing white caps and were carrying large knives.

=== San Jóse, Costa Rica (July 2014) ===
On 7 July 2014, a stabbing occurred in the Plaza de la Democracia injuring 3 people after the country lost to the Netherlands in the 2014 FIFA World Cup

=== Žd’ár nad Sázavou, Czech Republic (October 2014) ===
On 14 October 2014, a woman with schizophrenia killed one student and injured 2 others and a police negotiator at a secondary school.

== 2015 ==
=== Sumoto, Japan (March 2015) ===
On 9 March 2015, a man killed 5 people in a prolonged stabbing attack.

=== Jerusalem, Israel (July 2015) ===
Yishai Shlisel, who was previously arrested for stabbing 3 people in 2005 at the Jerusalem gay pride parade, stabbed and injured six marchers at the Jerusalem gay pride parade on 30 July 2015. It was three weeks after he was released from jail for the 2005 incident. One of the victims, 16-year-old Shira Banki, died of her wounds at the Hadassah Medical Center three days later, on 2 August 2015. Shortly after, Prime Minister Netanyahu offered his condolences, adding "We will deal with the murderer to the fullest extent of the law."

=== Pendleton, South Carolina (October 2015) ===
On Halloween 2015, 32-year-old Amy Vilardi, cut the throats of her mother, stepfather, grandmother, and stepgrandmother before shooting them post-mortem. She was convincted of the massacre almost a decade later and sentenced to life imprisonment without parole. The motive behind the massacre was financial. It is considered one of the worst mass murders in Anderson County.

=== Sliven, Bulgaria (November 2015) ===
On 6 November 2015, a 28-year-old man stabbed three people with a butterfly knife on the steps of a secondary school in Sliven. One of them, a 15-year-old girl, died while the other two, a 40-year-old teacher and another 28-year-old man were injured. The perpetrator had been a friend and neighbour to the killed student and in 2014, he had asked to enter a relationship with the then-14-year-old girl. She refused and told her mother about his advances, also informing the attacked teacher when the perpetrator began writing her threatening messages. Following a suicide attempt, the perpetrator convinced the girl to a meeting at the school, with the teacher and a friend of the perpetrator watching the scene from a distance out of suspicion. The perpetrator had caught both of the female victims off-guard by firing a gas pistol at them, stabbing the girl twenty times and the teacher three times; the friend was scared off by the gunfire. The perpetrator fled the scene for the back of the school, where he shot and injured himself using the pistol. In 2016, the perpetrator was given a maximum prison sentence of 30 years.

=== Tel Aviv, Israel (November 2015) ===
On 19 November 2015, an assailant approached the entrance of a Tel Aviv synagogue at prayer time, and stabbed and killed two worshipers. The attacker was arrested. At approximately 14:00 pm, the assailant approached the entrance to the informal prayer room located in a South Tel Aviv building during afternoon prayers. Worshippers inside the synagogue became aware of the attack when a man covered in blood staggered into the room and someone shouted, "There's a terrorist." Some worshipers assisted the wounded man while the other men who had been praying rushed to close the door, leaning against it to prevent the attacker from entering. When the terrorist ceased attempting to shove the door open, they rushed out with makeshift weapons to try to subdue him.

This attack shocked the nation coming, as it did, after a period of calm, free of terror attacks. According to the Jewish non-governmental organization ADL, it was "the bloodiest day in Israel since this latest round of Palestinian violence began back in September."

This was the first attack to be carried out by a Palestinian who had successfully passed through the security screening process and obtained a permit to work in Israel. The Coordinator of Government Activities in the Territories responded by suspending 1,200 entry permits to Israel, for Palestinians from the Hebron area.

The attacker, Raid Halil bin Mahmoud (36), father of five, was arrested and identified as an Arab from the town of Dura. He had recently been granted a permit to work in a Tel Aviv restaurant, but told authorities that his purpose in getting the permit had been to kill Jews. The attacker had been granted the work permit enabling him to enter Israel only 4 days before he stabbed two men to death at the synagogue. The assailant was indicted for murder on 13 December 2015. The Israeli government demolished Raid Halil bin Mahmoud's West Bank home in response to the attack.

=== Modi’in, Israel or West Bank (November 2015) ===
On 23 November 2015, a Palestinian killed an Israeli soldier and injured two other people at a gas station. the perpetrator was then killed by police.

== 2016 ==
=== Thane, India (February 2016) ===
On 28 February 2016, Hasnain Warekar fatally stabbed 14 members of his family before taking his own life. The murders took place in Thane. The victims were his parents, wife, two daughters, three of his four sisters, four nephews and two nieces. According to the police, there were multiple motives including: substantial financial debt, sexual abuse of a sibling, and his own psychological distress. At the time (2016), the killings were classified as the "worst-ever family homicide" in the country's history.

The incident took place at 1:00 am in Thane district of Maharashtra. The murderer's name was given in different sources as Hasnel Anwar Warekar, Husnail Varekar and Asnain Anwar Warekar, aged 35. Warekar sedated his victims by spiking a soft-drink he gave them, before slitting their throats with a large knife. The victims were his parents, wife, two daughters, three of his four sisters, four nephews and two nieces. After killing them, he hanged himself. Warekar's motives were; financial debt, he had borrowed 6,700,000 Rs ($US693,675 dollars) from family members, and lost it in the stock market; he had overheard a sibling he was sexually abusing telling his surviving sister of the abuse, and he was being treated for a psychological issue. A 21-year-old sister of his survived and was taken to a hospital.

=== Memphis, Tennessee, U.S (July 2016) ===
On July 1, 2016, 29-year-old Shanynthia Gardner, armed with a large butcher knife, stabbed and slashed her four of her five children, 4-year-old Tallen, 3-year-old Sya, 2-year-old Sahvi, and 6-month-old Sahvi, to death in her Memphis, Tennessee, Apartment. One child escaped the apartment and told a neighbor his mother was attacking his siblings. Police soon responded to the apartment and found the children scattered around the apartment and Gardner with superficial cuts to her body.

Gardner wouldn't stand trial until 2021. At her trial, her defense said she had severe mental illness and believed her children were going to be taken away and killed them so they wouldn't. The prosecution said that she killed them out of revenge for suspecting an affair her husband was having. She was found guilty and convicted of killing her four children. She was sentenced to life imprisonment with the chance of parole after 46 years.

=== Lingshan, China (September 2016) ===
A 56-year-old knifeman stabbed four elementary aged children to death on their way to school in Lingshan County, China on 26 September 2016.

=== Orem, Utah (November 2016) ===
On 15 November 2016, a student stabbed and injured five students at random before getting arrested.

=== Savu, Indonesia (December 2016) ===
On 13 December 2017, a thirty-two-year-old man committed a knife attack in a school injuring seven people.

== 2017 ==
=== Düsseldorf, Germany (March 2017) ===
The 2017 Düsseldorf axe attack occurred when a 36-year-old asylum seeker from Kosovo attacked fellow passengers with an axe aboard a train on 9 March 2017. He injured nine persons on a train and continued in the main train station in Düsseldorf, Germany. He fled jumping from a bridge and injured himself severely. He was considered to be mentally ill without a connection to terrorism.

The assailant was aboard a train when he suddenly began attacking fellow passengers with an axe. A fellow passenger managed to push him off the train, whereupon he attempted to get back on board by kicking and beating against the door. When he was unable to force the door open, he began attacking people in the central train station.

The suspect, a 36-year-old man identified by authorities as being an asylum seeker from Kosovo in the former Yugoslavia, who arrived in Germany in 2009, resided in Wuppertal. Sources describe the attacker as being from Kosovo, a disputed territory formerly part of Yugoslavia. Investigators see no indication that the suspect had a terrorist background.

The attacker fled the scene, then jumped from a nearby bridge while attempting to escape capture, injuring himself when he jumped. He was injured too severely to permit authorities to question him in the immediate aftermath of the attack. Police described the attacker as a 2009 asylum seeker from Kosovo who suffered from a "psychological disorder." In October 2017, the perpetrator was declared incapable by court. He was permanently housed in a locked-ward psychiatry. Authorities did not see a connection to terrorism.

=== Akulivik, Canada (June 2017) ===
On 10 June 2017, a rare stabbing spree occurred in the Inuit village of Akulivik leaving three people dead and two others injured.

=== Hamburg, Germany (July 2017) ===
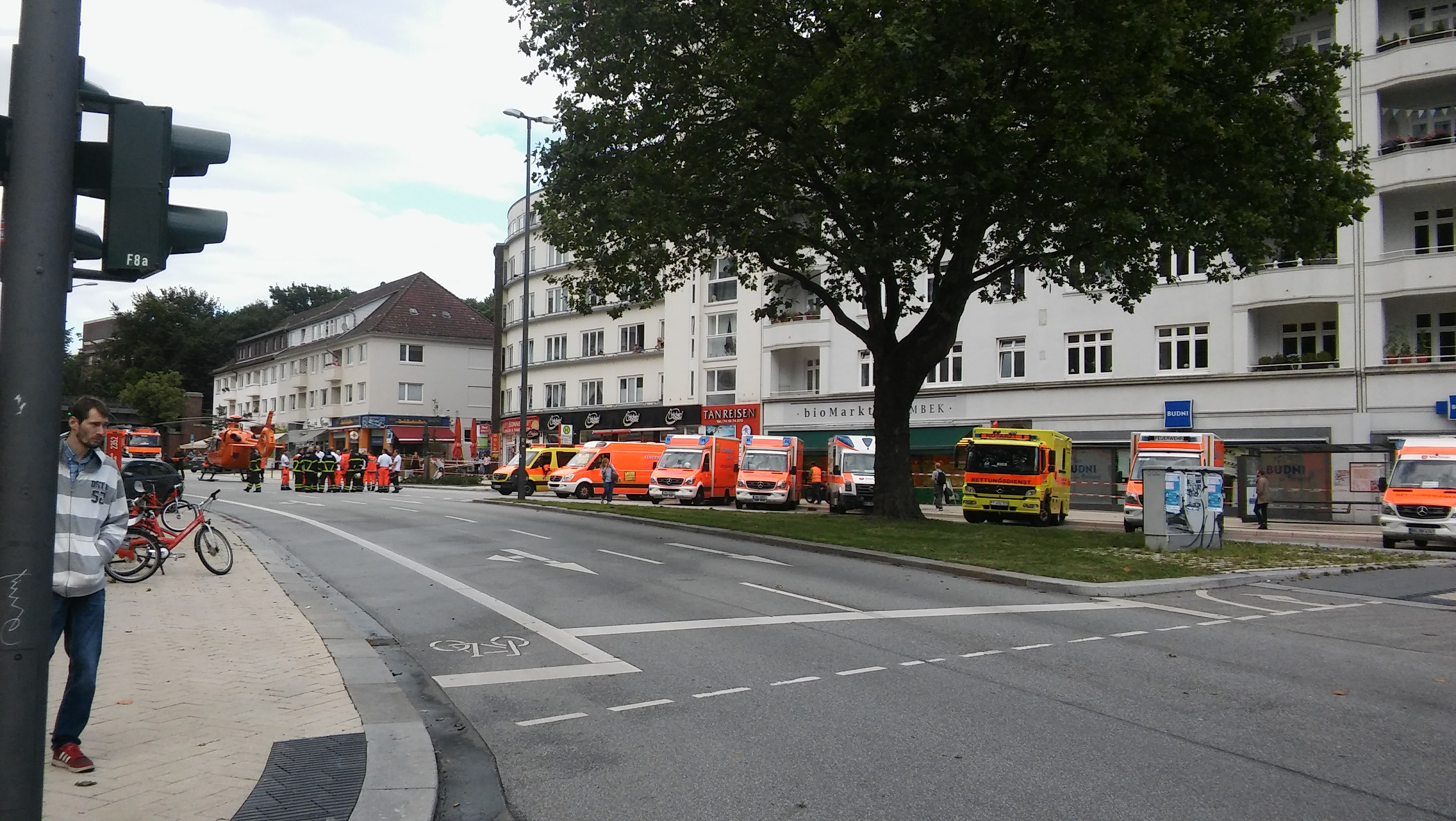
Ambulances at the scene after the attack

At 3 pm on 28 July 2017, Ahmad Alhaw, a 26-year-old Palestinian failed asylum seeker, went to an Edeka supermarket in Fuhlsbüttler Strasse in the Barmbek area of Hamburg. He took a 20 cm-long kitchen knife from the supermarket shelf and used it to attack several people, killing a 50-year-old German man. Deutsche Welle reported 6 injured in addition to the killing. According to eyewitnesses the man shouted "Allahu Akbar" during the attack. Prosecutors said that he had hoped to die as a martyr.

Der Spiegel reported the suspect, who was arrested at the scene, as a refugee named Ahmad A., who allegedly had contacts with the Salafist sect, as well as having psychological and drug problems. He is a 26-year-old Palestinian born in the United Arab Emirates who arrived in Germany in 2015. Hamburg's Interior Minister Andy Grote stated that the suspect "was known as an Islamist but not a jihadist".

Citing security sources, Berlin newspaper Der Tagesspiegel reported that the perpetrator was a failed asylum seeker who was known to German police; he had been added to the list of 800 suspected Islamists in Hamburg prior to the attack. The news agency DPA reported that security authorities were investigating evidence the man had Salafist ties. He was awaiting deportation, but had not been deported because he did not have "identification and travel documents". While German prosecutors claim that the attacker had a "radical Islamist" motive, investigators have not found any links to jihadist groups. Alhaw also had watched ISIS propaganda videos online which radicalized him over a period of time.

== 2018 ==
=== Ulan–Ude, Russia (January 2018) ===
On 19 January 2018, seven people were injured in an axe and Molotov attack in a classroom.

=== Kanagawa Prefecture, Japan (June 2018) ===
On the night of 9 June 2018, 22-year-old Ichiro Kojima (小島 一朗) attacked passengers with a billhook on the Tokaido Shinkansen train that was running in Kanagawa Prefecture. He killed one and seriously injured two people. Kojima, the criminal, was arrested by the police and subsequently charged with murder and other charges. "I wanted to go to jail. It was a hassle to think for myself and live. I thought it would be easier to live within the rules set by others, so I aimed for life imprisonment." he said. Kojima was sentenced to life imprisonment in December 2019 and was confirmed in January 2020. He expressed joy in being sentenced to life imprisonment he wanted. In response to this incident, the companies that operate the Shinkansen worked to strengthen the safety measures for the Shinkansen.

=== New York City, New York (September 2018) ===
On 21 September 2018, a woman stabbed and injured 5 people including 3 infants. All of the injured were in stable condition.

=== Manchester, United Kingdom (December 2018) ===
On 31 December 2018 at 20:52 GMT, three people were stabbed in a knife attack at Manchester Victoria station. A man and woman in their 50s and a British Transport Police officer were seriously injured. The perpetrator, Mahdi Mohamud, was originally detained under the Mental Health Act, was sentenced to life imprisonment; he was to initially be detained in a high-security psychiatric hospital until he was well enough to be transferred to prison. Witnesses reported that he shouted "Allah" during the attack and "Allahu Akbar" after being arrested. He appears to have acted alone.

Two of the three victims, a couple who had come into town to celebrate the New Year, were hospitalised with serious injuries. The third victim was a British Transport Police officer who received a stab wound to his shoulder.

The suspect, due to concerns over his mental health, was initially held under the Mental Health Act. He is a 25-year-old man from Somalia who has lived in England for about 10 years and resides in Manchester's Cheetham neighbourhood with his parents and siblings. On 31 May 2019, it was reported that the suspect was charged with a terrorism offence and three counts of attempted murder, and was due to appear in court. The perpetrator pleaded guilty to three counts of attempted murder and a terror offence. In November 2019 he was sentenced to life imprisonment in a high-security psychiatric hospital.

Police are reported as having an open mind in relation to the motives. Greater Manchester Police said that because of the nature of the attack, their officers were looking into the state of the suspect's mental health. The BBC reported that a witness alleged that during the attack he shouted "Allah" and also shouted a slogan "criticising Western governments". BBC producer Sam Clack reported he heard him saying "As long as you keep bombing other countries this sort of s--- is going to keep happening," According to The Guardian, witnesses heard the attacker shout "Allahu Akbar" after he was arrested and "long live the caliphate".

== 2019 ==
=== Turramurra, Australia (January 2019) ===
On 12 January, a 34-year-old mentally ill researcher stabbed and injured six teenagers during a confrontation.

=== Stowbtsy, Belarus (February 2019) ===
On 11 February 2019, two people were killed and two others were injured in a school stabbing committed by a student, 15-year-old Vadim Miloshevsky. In September 2019 the perpetrator was sentenced to 13 years imprisonment.

=== London, United Kingdom (March–April 2019) ===
Between 30 March and 2 April 2019, a 29-year-old man injured five people in five separate stabbing attacks.

=== Thanh Hoa, Vietnam (May 2019) ===
On 12 May 2019, an eleven-year-old student was stabbed to death before the perpetrator attacked four more people.

=== Richmond, Virginia (July 2019) ===
On 4 July 2019, 3 people were stabbed with a machete in a plasma centre during 4 July celebrations.

=== Orange County, California (August 2019) ===
On 7 August 2019, a man killed four people and injured two in seven locations in Garden Grove and Santa Ana, California. He was arrested and suspected to have been motivated by "robbery, hate, homicide".

=== Manchester, United Kingdom (October 2019) ===
On 12 October 2019, four people were injured, one critically in a mass stabbing at the Manchester Arndale shopping centre. A man in his early 40s was arrested.

=== The Hague, Netherlands (November 2019) ===
On 30 November 2019, Three people were injured during a stabbing at a shopping street.

== See also ==
- List of mass stabbing incidents (before 2010)
- List of mass stabbing incidents (2020-present)
- List of mass stabbings by death toll
