= Keren Neubach =

- קרן נויבך
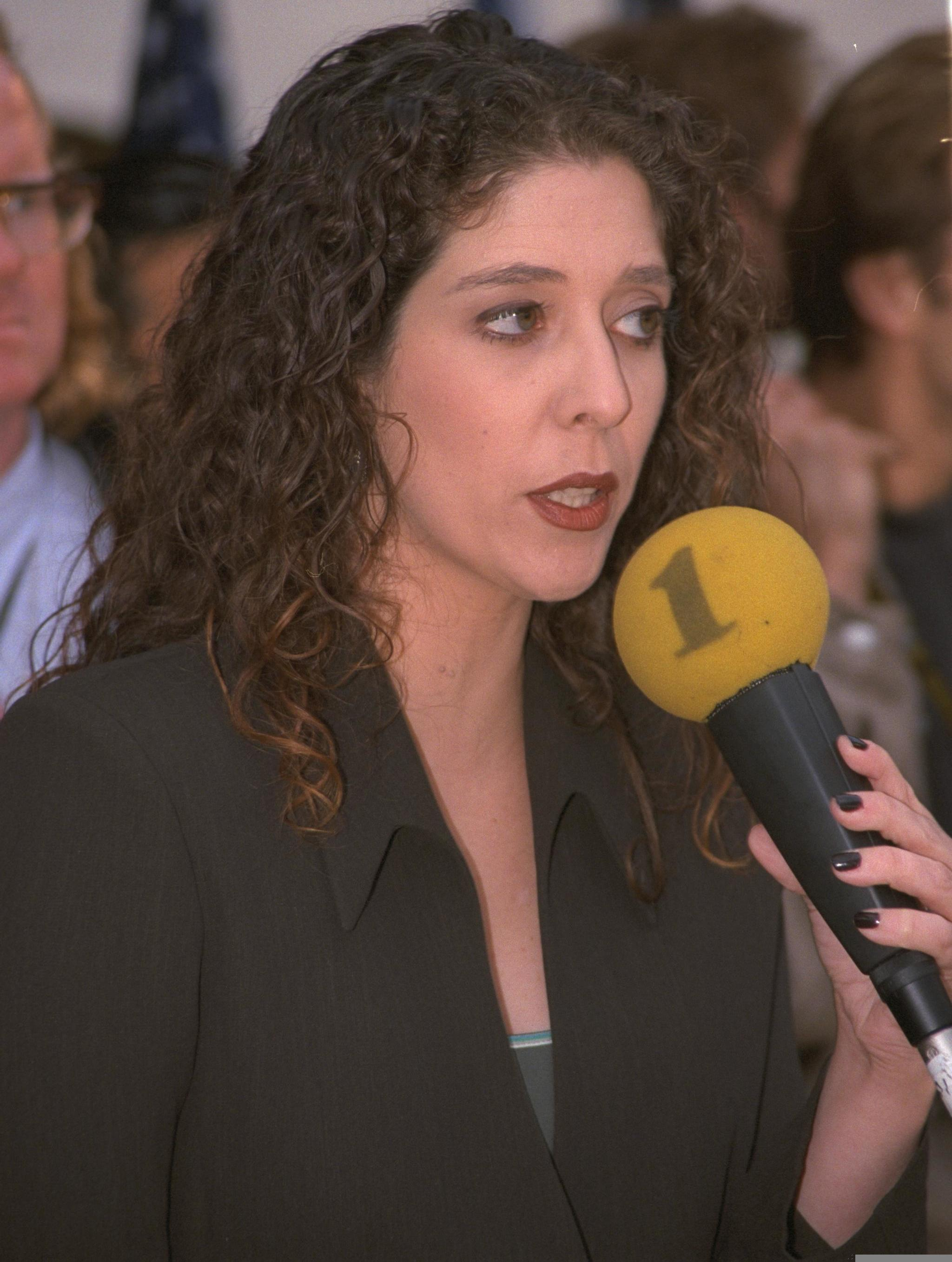
- Born: March 28, 1970 (age 56); Erez, Israel
- Education: Tel Aviv University
- Television: Israeli Public Broadcasting Corporation

Keren Neubach (Hebrew: קרן נויבך; born March 28, 1970) is an Israeli journalist, television presenter for the Israeli (public) Channel 1, and radio presenter for Reshet Bet.

== Biography ==
Keren Neubach was born in kibbutz Erez, daughter of businessman Amnon Neubach. She grew up in Kiryat Ono.

In her youth she dreamt of becoming a novelist.

Neubach earned her BA in History from Tel Aviv University.

When she was conscripted into the IDF, she was sent to serve as a correspondent for Galei Zahal, and in 1991, was the station's Washington D.C. correspondent, and also wrote for Al HaMishmar newspaper.

When she returned to Israel in 1993, she took the post of correspondent of political parties for Channel 1, and later served as the political correspondent. In this capacity she wrote a book about the 1996 (post Rabin assassination) campaign for Prime Minister between Shimon Peres and Benjamin Netanyahu, HaMerots: Behirot 96 (The Race: Elections 96).

In 2004, the CO of Channel 1, Yosef Barel, decided to terminate her position as correspondent, and she began to present news and current events programs.

Neubach speaks often about violence towards women and is a volunteer at the center for victims of sexual abuse. Her political inclination is Socialist and she is often critical of government policies, especially on socioeconomic issues.

In 2008, Neubach launched her new radio program, dealing with current (not directly political) issues, on Kol Yisrael's Reshet Bet. In 2009, she won a prize for uncovering governmental corruption, awarded by Ometz, the organization of Citizens for Correct Administration and Social and Legal Justice. That same year, her program won the Radio Awards best program for current events prize.

In 2015, following the stabbing of six marchers in the Jerusalem Pride Parade, one of whom, Shira Banki, died of her wounds, Neubach came out as bisexual in a Facebook post.
