= Judy Spotheim =

Israeli-Dutch writer and audio engineer

- Born: November 2, 1940; Israel
- Died: June 4, 2023 (aged 82)
- Other names: Sharon Shapira (pen name); Judith Spotheim-Koreneef
- Occupations: Novelist, audio engineer
- Known for: The Cut (1977); SpJ La Luce turntable
- Notable work: The Cut

Judy Spotheim (2 November 1940 - 4 June 2023; also known professionally as Judith Spotheim-Koreneef) was an Israeli-born transgender writer and audio engineer. In 1977 she published The Cut (in Hebrew: החתך), written under the pen name Sharon Shapira, an autobiographical novel widely regarded as Israel's first transgender novel. After leaving Israel in the 1980s, she settled in the Netherlands and became known in the high-end audio world as the designer of the La Luce turntable and the SpJ tonearm.

== Early life ==
Spotheim came of age within the small, marginalised trans community that formed in the commercial-sex districts of Tel Aviv–Jaffa during the 1960s and 1970s. Members of this community, sometimes referred to by the era's slang term coccinelles, lived largely outside mainstream Israeli society and were excluded even by the emerging gay and lesbian movement of the period, which distanced itself from trans women.

== The Cut (1977) ==
In autumn 1977, Spotheim published an autobiographical novel titled The Cut through the publisher Sifriyat Poalim, writing under the pen name Sharon Shapira. Set against the backdrop of the 1973 war, the novel follows two young trans women, Roni and Liora, as they seek love and gender transition while navigating Tel Aviv's sex economy. The book aimed to humanise trans women to a broader readership and, unusually for its subject matter, achieved enough attention to be reprinted within a year of its first release.

The Cut nonetheless fell into obscurity, forgotten by both Hebrew literary history and Israeli queer historiography, and for many years Yotam Reuveny's 1978 novel In Favor of Hallucination (Beʻad Ha-hazayah) was cited as Israel's first gay novel. Spotheim's voice was effectively silenced twice over: by Israeli society at large, and by the nascent LGBT community, which was at the time actively distancing itself from trans people in its own bid for legitimacy.

== Later career ==
After leaving Israel in the 1980s with her Dutch husband, Spotheim settled in Eindhoven, the Netherlands, and moved into precision audio engineering, becoming known under the name Judith Spotheim-Koreneef. She designed the La Luce turntable, a non-suspended, direct-coupled design driven by a stand-alone motor and an elastic-thread belt, along with its companion SpJ tonearm, a "duo-pivot" design. Both products were manufactured to fine tolerances and marketed as precision instruments rather than conventional consumer hi-fi gear.

The La Luce and SpJ arm drew acclaim in the audiophile press, notably in Stereophile magazine, which reviewed the turntable in October 1998 and later published an interview with Spotheim in January 2000. The products were for a time distributed in the United States by Cardas Audio. Reviewers praised the engineering rigor behind the design, including detailed documentation on cartridge setup and overhang geometry, and the turntable's sound quality, which one reviewer described as having become a personal reference for LP playback.

== See also ==
- The Cut
- LGBT history in Israel
- Efrat Tilma
