= Angels Onlus =

A.N.G.E.L.S. ( it: Angels Onlus) – Associazione Nazionale Giovani Energie Latrici (di) Solidarietà is an Italian Onlus, founded in Rome during the 2008, promoted by the 'Presidenza della Fondazione Antonio Genovesi Salerno - SDOA', operating with purpose to contribute to the diffusion of the culture of the peace, the solidarity and an idea of human ecology, meant as a social and cultural well-being.

A.N.G.E.L.S. follows the objectives and principles of the Convention on the Rights of Children, and through an internal status, approved by a board of directors, governs a number of initiatives that embrace the fundraising for departments of pediatric, in Italy and abroad, health care, training but also a whole range of artistic activities to promote the concepts of peace and solidarity.

During 2009 and 2010 A.N.G.E.L.S. came in evidence also over main Italian networks due to effort to provide health care in Italian hospitals to sick children coming from war zone or where there are no adequate health centers.

== Partnerships and activities ==
A.N.G.E.L.S is the only Onlus to have received the Patronage of Unesco (Italian National Commission) for the production of the song 'Angels' evaluated of 'fundamental importance for peace and solidarity between populations'. Besides the Medal of the President of Italian Republic Giorgio Napolitano, the Onlus has received the support of other patronages like Holy See (June 2008), Italian 'Ministro della Gioventù' Giorgia Meloni (October 2008), foreign Minister Franco Frattini (November 2008), culture Minister Sandro Bondi (November 2008), 'Società Italiana di Pediatria' (November 2008) activities; it has also been signed a collaboration with the 'Forum Nazionale Giovani' (February 2009).

On 27 October 2008 A.N.G.E.L.S signed an agreement with the pediatric department of the 'Università degli Studi di Roma La Sapienza' in order to collaborate to take care of sick children abroad. Following, during March 2009, the Onlus has signed a collaboration with the 'Policlinico Umberto I of Rome', directed by the dott. Ubaldo Montaguti, that will make available 4 beds in the Pediatric Department each year to take care of strangers sick children supported by A.N.G.E.L.S.

Several other agreements have been put in place by A.N.G.E.L.S in order to carry on the projects; of fundamental importance is the patronage of Italian Air Navy, to transport childer and their relatives from war zones to Italy.

In order to promote its projects Angels has also received the support of main Italian TV networks like Mediaset Group and MTV, where have been transmitted promotional videoclips about the Onlus.

On 22 December 2008, the song 'Angels', wrote and interpreted by Princess Bee, during the football match 'A goal for the peace', held in San Siro stadium in Milan, has been the inn of football team 'Ambassadors of the Peace', made up by several worldwide football champions which have acceded to this charity event.

During 2009, the non-profit organization has also received the patronage of the Regione Lazio, the Carabinieri, the Guardia di Finanza, the City of Rome and the RAI Social Action.

Also in 2009, A.N.G.E.L.S has signed important agreements, starting with the 'Festival Internazionale del Film di Roma' which allows the non-profit organization to be present at the Festival and the promotion of the videoclip "Angels" and of the activities for children and young people. In the same year A.N.G.E.L.S enters in the Regional Registry of Associations of the 'Regione Lazio' and into the set of 20 associations promoting important social interests, which compose the Management Committee of CIVICRAZIA.

Spokeswoman of ANGELS is Benedetta Paravia (Princess Bee) who, since 2008 leads most of the activities of the onlus.
