= Shield of Solomon =

- Release date: 2008
- Country: Israel

Shield of Solomon is a documentary by Igal Hecht about four refugees from the War in Darfur who have found sanctuary in the Jewish state of Israel.

== Summary ==
Since April 2007 more than three thousand Darfur and South Sudanese refugees have crossed the Egyptian border into Israel. If caught at the border by the Egyptian military the refugees are either tortured, jailed, or killed. Caught off guard, Israel faced a moral dilemma. Israel and Sudan are still officially considered enemies and the Sudanese government has stated publicly that any refugee who has entered Israel will be killed if returned to Sudan.

== Film festivals ==
- San Diego Jewish Film Festival, February 2009
- Rhode Island International Film Festival, August 2008
