= LGBTQ history in Israel =

Israel pride flag

Homosexual relations were legalised in the state of Israel in 1988, but there's no record of enforcement of "buggery" law before this, (Note: In 1953, the Attorney General declared that laws against homosexuality would not be enforced against consenting adults, reinforced by a Supreme Court decision in 1963.) and during the 1990s various forms of discrimination were prohibited, making LGBT rights in Israel the most progressive in the Middle East. Debate has since centred on recognition of same-sex partnerships and the rights they confer, including inheritance, residency, and the adoption of children. The staging of LGBT pride parades has been controversial in some cases.

== 19th century ==
In 1858, the Ottoman Empire ruled the area of modern-day Israel and Palestine as part of Ottoman Syria. It abolished its existing sodomy laws in its Penal Code (Article 198) so long as it was consensual and the consenting partner was above the age of consent.

Beginning in 1882, Ashkenazi Jewish migrants from the Russian Empire fled to Ottoman Palestine in a series of waves to escape rising antisemitism, encouraged by Perez Smolenskin's suggestion that Jews make aliyah to Israel in large movements. Smolenskin's urging of European Jews could be seen as a precursor to Theodor Herzl's Zionism. It is not known if the growth in nuance for homosexuality began with any of the early Russian settlers, as the territory from which they had migrated had largely been populated with homophobic cultural traits; however, as Jewish Russians were only recently beginning to integrate into mainstream Russian society away from the Pale of Settlement, views on homosexuality likely sharply differed between Jewish intellectuals and religious clerics when migrating to, and establishing the agricultural settlements in the area.

== 20th century ==
=== 1900–1950s ===
The British Mandate of Palestine was given to Britain in 1923 after the disbandment of the Ottoman Empire following the events of WWI. Now governing a new territory, the British took some interest in the population of Palestine. In terms of sexuality and sexual rights, British involvement began in terms of questionnaires which would question the Palestinian population about their sexual practices and what they considered both unnatural and immoral. It was revealed that in Palestine there existed many ways of "unnatural" sexual expression including sodomy between school boys and acts of lesbian love which were blamed on influences from nearby countries such as Syria and Egypt. Though these acts were not considered horrible to Palestine, they were considered unnatural and immoral to the British colonizers. Thus, throughout British rule of the mandate, Britain would slowly incorporate their homophobic policies into the lives of the Palestinian population. Until 1948, when the British Mandate would be partitioned to give land to the Jewish people, British leaders would encourage the criminalization and punishment of sexual acts that they determined were either unnatural, immoral, or both. Before the intervention of Britain and in the beginning of their intervention, the Palestinian population knew that acts of homosexuality in regards to both genders existed in their society. They deemed these acts as unnatural to the norm but not as immoral to way of life. After British intervention, the population would begin to criminalize these acts and this criminalization would last into the development of the Israeli State in 1948.

In 1943, the Acre district court documented one of the few recorded sodomy trials of the Mandate period, involving two Palestinian men, Mustafa Naif (age 16) and Mustafa Zaharan. Naif initially told police that he "used to love" Zaharan and the two "were friends and mates," but he later recanted his entire statement during trial. His recantation effectively protected Zaharan from sodomy conviction, as the courts required corroborating evidence of sexual acts. However, Naif was convicted of perjury for recanting his initial statement, suggesting he may have sacrificed himself to protect his friend from a sodomy conviction carrying up to 10 years' imprisonment. This case illustrates both the criminalization of same-sex relations under British Mandate law and the community strategies used to resist prosecution.

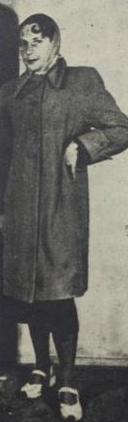
Rina Natan

The newly formed government of Israel continued the British tradition of enforcing the laws regarding the criminalization of homosexual relationships as well as other acts that the government deemed immoral or unnatural which included acts of gender fluidity. In the 1950s, an Israeli transgender woman by the name of Rina Natan was arrested for cross dressing, this entailed that she was wearing female clothes while being of biological male sex. The arrest was made on terms of her breaking public order. Later, the government had concluded that they could not charge her for wearing women's clothing and ultimately released her. After her arrest, she became very vocal in Israel's political sphere in regards to gender and transgender rights, even becoming known as Israel's first transgender rights activist. Specifically, she was protesting the Israeli government's policies and laws that denied her rights to treatment and denied her the appropriate resources to transition between the male to female gender. Denying her specifically on her gender reassignment surgery was Attorney General Haim Cohn who in 1954 was persistent in making sure that Natan would not receive her surgery. Following this, two short years later, Natan severed the penis that she was born with herself. After this, Israeli hospitals were forced to treat her and Rina Natan became Israel's first transgender woman. After her transition, Rina Natan was a woman by gender and in society but the Israeli government never changed the name and gender on her passport, which remained under her birth given male name. Natan would pave the way for gender and transgender rights in Israel. She gave transgender rights a sphere of influence in activism and her actions and story would lead the Israeli government to legally recognize and permit sex reassignment later in 1986.

=== 1960s ===
In 1960, Rina Ben-Menahem self-published her first book, "הדווקאים", describing the homosexual and lesbian scene in Israel from her first person acquaintance.

In 1963, Supreme Court justice Haim Cohn, who as Attorney General, had insisted on denying sex reassignment surgery to Rina Natan in the 1950s, denounced sodomy laws, stating that they were outdated and that consensual sexual acts were neither criminal nor morally wrong. By denouncing these policies, Justice Cohn discouraged authorities from enforcing them.

In 1968, Tel Aviv's first gay bar was opened by Amir Sharon in a private apartment. After this, gay clubs pop up around Israeli metropolitan areas and a secret club gains infamy. (See London Ministores Mall).

=== 1970s ===
In 1975, Israel's first organization to protect LGBT rights is established. (See The Aguda – Israel's LGBT Task Force). Alizada, coming from the Hebrew "happy" (aliz) becomes the first LGBT pride march in Israel on 17 September 1977.

=== 1980s ===
Shulamit Aloni starts bringing attention to LGBT rights in Israeli law in the beginning of the 1980s. In 1988, under Amendment 22 of Israeli Penal Law, same-sex sexual relations between consenting adults were decriminalized. The 1980s also brought employment discrimination protections to lesbian and gay Israelis.

=== 1990s ===
- In 1992 legislation was introduced to prohibit employment discrimination on the basis of sexual orientation, with some exemptions for religious organizations.
- In 1993, the Israeli Parliament revised the military rules so that gay, lesbian and bisexual Israelis can serve openly and on an equal footing with their heterosexual counterparts; homosexuals have been allowed to serve openly in the military, including special units.
- The first Pride parade in Tel Aviv took place in 1993.
- MK Yael Dayan makes an impassioned speech before the Knesset for gay and lesbian rights in Israel, quoting Torah passages regarding David's relationship with Jonathan.
- In 1994, unregistered cohabitation was legalized for the first time.
- In 1998, Dana International, a trans woman, represented Israel in the Eurovision Song Contest, winning with her song "Diva".

== 21st century ==
=== 2000s ===
==== Events and incidents ====
In 2001, Pride is first held in Eilat (Eilat Pride).

On 30 June 2005, the fourth annual Pride march of Jerusalem took place. It had originally been prohibited by a municipal ban which was cancelled by the court. Many of the religious leaders of Jerusalem's Muslim, Jewish and Christian communities had arrived to a rare consensus asking the municipal government to cancel the permit of the paraders. During the parade, a Haredi Jewish man, Yishai Schlissel, attacked three people with a kitchen knife and was sentenced to 10 years in prison for the crime.

Another parade, this time billed as an international event, was scheduled to take place in the summer of 2005, but was postponed to 2006 due to the stress on police forces during the summer of Israel's unilateral disengagement plan. In 2006, it was again postponed due to the Israel-Hezbollah war. It was scheduled to take place in Jerusalem on 10 November 2006, and caused a wave of protests by Haredi Jews around central Israel; the ugliest incident took place during the 2006 Jerusalem gay pride parade.

The Israel National Police had filed a petition to cancel the parade due to foreseen strong opposition. Later, an agreement was reached to convert the parade into an assembly inside the Hebrew University stadium in Jerusalem. 21 June 2007, the Jerusalem Open House organization succeeded in staging a parade in central Jerusalem after police allocated thousands of personnel to secure the general area. The rally planned afterwards was cancelled due to an unrelated national fire brigade strike which prevented proper permits from being issued.

In 2008 the City of Tel Aviv opened the Municipal LGBT Community Center, the first of its kind in the country.

In August 2009, an armed attacker shot dead two people and injured 15 more in an attack on a lesbian and gay centre in Tel Aviv. The incident has been deplored by many organizations and government officials, such as the Prime Minister of Israel, Benjamin Netanyahu, and President Shimon Peres.

==== Family and relationship rights ====
An Israeli family court on 17 March 2002, turned down an application from a lesbian couple to have their partnership union declared legal. The couple was united in a civil ceremony in Germany. The women wanted the court to recognize their partnership as a civil marriage, under Israeli law. The court said that since the women are not recognized as a family under Israeli law, the court is not authorized to rule on their case. A government lawyer who was asked by the court to give a legal opinion on the case on behalf of the Israeli government said that the state objected to granting the request.

On 14 December 2004, the Nazareth District Court ruled that same-sex couples have the same rights as married couples in inheritance rights. This ruling overturned a Family Court ruling that an elderly man from Kiryat Shmona was not entitled to spousal rights. The man had sought the estate of his late partner, with whom he lived for several decades. The Nazareth judges ruled that the term "man and woman" as spelled out in Israel's inheritance law also includes same sex couples. Judges Nissim Maman and Gabriela Levy, who issued the majority opinion, based their decision on a loose interpretation of the term "partner" as defined in other court rulings, such as those dealing with issues related to employee benefits, and thus applied the interpretation to the inheritance law. The acting president of the Nazareth District Court, Menachem Ben-David, issued the minority opinion, arguing that the legal text should not be interpreted "contrary to the lingual significance." A government spokesperson said the ruling will be appealed.

In December 2004, the Tel Aviv District Court ruled that the government cannot deport the Colombian partner of a gay Israeli man. The 32-year-old Colombian entered Israel on a visitors visa which has long expired and the Interior Ministry had ordered him deported. His partner is an Israeli citizen and a soldier in the Israel Defense Forces. The couple filed an emergency petition with the Tel Aviv District Court. The men were represented by the Association for Civil Rights in Israel. Judge Uzi Vogelman ruled that the government had acted illegally in attempting to deport the man. In 1999 Supreme Court ruling established that the ministry could not deport foreign nationals married to Israeli citizens. Vogelman's decision extends that to apply to common-law marriages, including same-sex couples.

On 10 January 2005, the Supreme Court ruled that a lesbian couple is able to legally adopt each other's children. During the past 15 years that Tal and Avital Jarus-Hakak have lived together, they have had a total of three children. In November 2005, a groundbreaking court decision in Israel ruled that a lesbian spouse could officially adopt a child born to her current partner by artificial insemination from an anonymous sperm donor; this ruling came despite protests by the minority Orthodox Jewish parliamentary parties. Following the supreme court ruling, a lesbian couple was allowed to adopt each other's biological children on February 12, 2006. Before that, gay partners of parents were granted guardianship over their partner's children.

On 29 January 2007, following a Supreme Court ruling ordering them to do so, Jerusalem registered its first gay couple, Avi and Binyamin Rose.

In March 2008, Israel's Interior Ministry granted a gay Palestinian from Jenin a rare residency permit to live with his partner of 8 years in Tel Aviv after he said his sexuality put his life in danger in the West Bank.

On 10 March 2009, the Tel Aviv family court ruled that former Knesset member Uzi Even and his partner, Amit Kama, can legally adopt their 30-year-old foster son, Yossi, making them the first same-sex male couple in Israel whose right of adoption has been legally acknowledged.

=== 2010s ===
In July 2015, Yishai Schlissel, an Orthodox Jew released from prison after spending 10 years in jail for stabbing participants in a 2005 LGBT pride event in Jerusalem, attacked six marchers with a knife. One of the victims, a teenage girl named Shira Banki, died of her wounds. A central square in Jerusalem is to be renamed "Tolerance Square" in memory of Banki. The incident was widely condemned by Israeli political leaders, including Prime Minister Benjamin Netanyahu. On 26 June 2016, Schlissel was sentenced to life imprisonment plus 31 years and ordered to pay NIS 2,064,000 (approximately $650,000) in compensation to victims' families.

On 23 February 2016, the Knesset marked Israel's first official LGBT rights day. Israeli Prime Minister Benjamin Netanyahu addressed the legislature, stating that every person was created in the image of God and pledging the government's commitment to LGBT equality. The announcement coincided with the Ministry of Finance increasing annual budgets allocated to the LGBTQ community from NIS 2 million to NIS 11 million. Despite these symbolic gestures, on 24 February 2016, the governing coalition parties (Likud, United Torah Judaism, Shas, Kulanu, and Jewish Home) defeated multiple bills aimed at expanding LGBTQ rights, including bills to recognize bereaved same-sex spouses, ban conversion therapy, recognize same-sex marriage, and train health professionals on gender and sexual orientation issues.

In December 2016, Attorney General Avichai Mandelblit issued an instruction to Israel's Interior Ministry to grant same-sex couples the same citizenship rights as opposite-sex couples. Previously, same-sex spouses of Israeli citizens had to wait up to seven years for citizenship and were typically granted only permanent residency. The decision came in response to a lawsuit filed by the Gay Fathers Association and represented a major advance in equal treatment under Israeli law.

In late August 2017, the Israeli Government announced that it would no longer oppose same-sex adoption and would enact new criteria allowing any couple, regardless of sexual orientation, to legally adopt children. Prior to this announcement, same-sex couples faced substantial discrimination in the adoption process: between 2008 and 2017, of 550 same-sex couples who applied to adopt, only three succeeded, compared to more than a thousand heterosexual couples. The government's reversal came in response to Supreme Court pressure from a petition filed by the Association of Israeli Gay Fathers and the Israel Religious Action Center.

In July 2018, the Israeli Knesset voted to maintain a surrogacy law that excluded single men and same-sex couples from accessing reproductive services available to heterosexual couples and single women. In response, the Aguda (Israel's LGBT Task Force) organized a nationwide LGBTQ strike on 22 July 2018. Tens of thousands of Israelis took to the streets to protest the discrimination. The strike culminated in an equal rights rally in Tel Aviv that drew over 100,000 participants, becoming one of the largest LGBT demonstrations in Israeli history.

In December 2018, the Israeli High Court of Justice ruled that same-sex parents have the right to be listed on their children's birth certificates. The decision came after two gay men adopted a son but were initially refused permission by the Interior Ministry to list both their names on his birth certificate. The ruling held that the government cannot refuse this right based on the parent's sexual orientation.

=== 2020s ===
On 27 February 2020, the Israeli High Court of Justice ruled that the Surrogacy Law, which restricted surrogacy access to married heterosexual couples only, violated the constitutional right to equality and the fundamental right to parenthood for same-sex couples and single men. The court gave the Knesset one year to amend the law. When Parliament failed to pass new legislation, the Supreme Court took action on 11 July 2021, unanimously ruling that the ban on surrogacy for same-sex couples and single men must be overturned. The decision, written by Supreme Court President Esther Hayut, was celebrated as a landmark victory after an 11-year legal battle. The new rules took effect on 12 January 2022, allowing same-sex couples and single individuals equal access to surrogacy.

On 14 February 2022, Health Minister Nitzan Horowitz issued an executive directive banning medical professionals from conducting conversion therapy, also known as "reparative therapy." Horowitz stated: "No one needs conversion. Lesbians, gay, trans and straight, you are just as good and beautiful as you are." The ban applies to all qualified therapists—including psychologists, social workers, and therapists licensed by the Israeli Ministry of Health—but does not bind rabbis, clergy, or alternative practitioners. While the Knesset has not yet codified the health ministry directive into law, the executive ban represents official government policy against the harmful practice.

In July 2022, the Central District Court declared marriages conducted in Israel through an online civil marriage service established by the U.S. state of Utah, including same-sex unions, as legally valid in Israel. This decision eliminated the necessity for same-sex couples to travel abroad for marriage. On 7 March 2023, the Supreme Court upheld this ruling, affirming that same-sex couples could marry in Israel using the online service and then register their marriages with the state, allowing them to apply for government benefits offered to married couples.

In August 2022, Prime Minister Yair Lapid urged the Knesset to legalize same-sex marriage. Citing opinion polls showing majority public support, he stated: "If most of the public is with us, why did all our bills on the matters fall or get stuck? Why am I the first Israeli prime minister to arrive at an event for the gay community?" Lapid accused other politicians of being "scared" of supporting same-sex marriage. An estimated 250,000 people marched in the Tel Aviv Pride Parade that June, with public opinion polls showing that a majority of Israelis supported same-sex marriage. However, formal legislative recognition of same-sex marriage remained blocked by religious authorities and conservative coalition members, as marriage in Israel is controlled by religious institutions rather than the secular government. As of 2024, same-sex marriage conducted through Israeli civil courts was recognized de facto, but religious authorities continued to refuse to perform same-sex ceremonies.

In March 2024, the Israel Supreme Court ordered that birth certificates be corrected and updated to reflect "both two parties of the female same-sex couple" for affected children, affirming that same-sex female couples could have their names appear equally on their children's official documentation.

In a historic reversal, the Tel Aviv Municipality cancelled the 2025 Pride Parade scheduled for 13 June 2025, after Israeli strikes on Iranian nuclear and military targets, with Tehran expected to respond in the coming hours. The march, the largest such event in the Middle East, had been expected to draw thousands to the famously open city, including guest of honor Caitlyn Jenner. It was to have been Tel Aviv's first Pride parade since before 7 October 2023, when the war in Gaza began. In July, Israel's High Court of Justice blocked a fast-track attempt to undo a gender change, holding that the gender-change certificate received in 2021 "remains valid," and any new certificate must follow the ministry's ordinary procedure. The ruling reinforced legal protections for transgender Israelis' right to maintain their gender recognition.

At the 2026 Jerusalem gay pride parade, the Jerusalem Municipality raised the Pride flag for the first time ever and hung Pride flags with the Hebrew inscription "equality in life" along the route from Sacher Park to the Knesset building to honour reservist Sagi Golan, who was killed in Be'eri during the Hamas attack on 7 October 2023.
