= Rina Natan =

Israeli transgender woman (1923–1979)

- רינה נתן
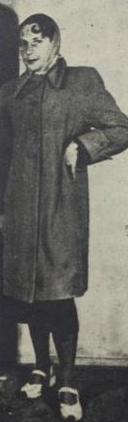
- Natan in 1953
- Born: 8 September 1923; Siegen, Weimar Republic
- Died: 13 August 1979 (aged 55)

Rina Natan (Hebrew: רינה נתן; 8 September 1923 – 13 August 1979) was the first known Israeli transgender woman.

== Biography ==
Natan was born on September 8, 1923, in the town of Siegen in Germany, to a wealthy Jewish family. As a child she excelled in music and art. Beginning as a child, she used to wear women's clothing. During World War II, she stayed for a period of time in France, where she learned agriculture. In 1946 she arrived in Palestine (then under the British Mandate) and moved between the Kibbutzim Ma'agan Michael, Ashdot Ya'akov, and Na'an. During the 1948 Arab-Israeli war she served in the army as a paramedic, but after her release she struggled to find a job, and therefore rejoined the army.

In the beginning of 1953, Natan's name made headlines after she was arrested by the police, under suspicions that she was wearing women's clothing for criminal intent. Natan explained to the police officers, as reported by the newspaper Haaretz: "I am a woman in my soul and in my emotions, and only for a physiological error I was born a man". In the years following she returned to the headlines for another arrest by the police, (Note: The arrest was due to "breach of public order"', and after no clause was found that could indict her for wearing women's clothing, it was decided to release her.) a hunger strike which she did in an endeavor to receive a permit for a gender-reassignment surgery.

Natan claimed initially that she was born with both male and female sexual organs – meaning, she was intersex. Surgeries had already been performed on intersex people in Israel, although in fall 1954 Natan was checked by a committee of doctors who said that she was not intersex.

In her efforts to be permitted to undergo gender reassignment surgery, she began harming herself. A doctor committee on behalf of the ministry of health recommended to comply with her request and allow her to undergo surgery, although the Attorney General of Israel at the time, Haim Cohn, refused the recommendation towards the end of 1954. In the wake of her recurring self-harm, she was reluctantly forced to receive testosterone injections. She resumed her battle, and on May 25, 1956 she arrived to a hospital bleeding and squirming in pain, after she had cut her penis. The "Herut" newspaper reported she smiled at the horrified doctors, and said:

"Nothing will be of help this time, and you will have to perform surgery on me, take away the unnecessary organs, and make me a woman."

Given the danger to her life, the doctors performed the surgery, and Natan became the first transsexual woman in Israel – undergoing sex reassignment surgery out of her own will. Following the surgery Natan received a new ID, in which her name was changed to Rina and her sex was changed to female, although in her passport the sex remained male. In November 1958, she left Israel to Zürich in Switzerland. Eventually, she made her way to Mannheim where she lived until January 1961, before moving to Saarbrücken and marrying 65-year-old businessman Willy Benjamin Knäbel in July 1961. Knäbel died in 1971 and Natan died at the age of 55 in 1979. The death certificate indicates that she had converted to Catholicism during her years in Germany.

== See also ==
- LGBT history in Israel
- LGBT rights in Israel
