= IDF field hospital for Gazans =

- Israeli Defense Force

Geography
- Location: Erez Crossing, Israel
- Coordinates: 31°33′29.52″N 34°32′41″E

Organisation
- Type: Field hospital

History
- Opened: July 20, 2014

Links
- Lists: Hospitals in Israel

The Israel Defense Forces opened a field hospital at Erez Crossing on July 20, 2014, intending it to be for sick and injured Palestinians from Gaza.

The hospital was opened in response to reports by Gazans and news media that the 2014 Israel–Gaza conflict had caused a dire shortage of medical facilities in Gaza. The decision to set up the hospital was made by the Israeli government following the recommendation of the coordinator of government activities in the Palestinian territories General Yoav Mordechai, and approved by the IDF Chief of Staff Lt. Gen. Benny Gantz.

According to Al Jazeera, Israeli soldiers at Erez Crossing attempted to persuade families to take relatives to the field hospital for treatment, rather than making the journey to a Palestinian-run hospital in East Jerusalem. IDF Lt.-Col. Sharon Biton from the office of the Coordinator of Government Activities in the Territories stated that "some" of the refugees passing through the Erez Crossing "refused to get medical treatments" in the Israeli field hospital. The IDF Spokesman's office asserted that Hamas “prevented Palestinians from entering Israel in order to reach the hospital.” A Gazan who asked that his name not be reported told the Jerusalem Post people are reluctant to use the field hospital out of fear Gazans treated in the IDF hospital will come under suspicion by Hamas, which controlled Gaza at the time.

The hospital had 20 doctors, nurses and technicians, a lab, an X-ray device and a pharmacy. Among the doctors were a pediatrician, an ophthalmologist and a gynecologist. The hospital was also equipped for childbirth. Hospital officials reported having saved the lives of several Gazans, including a young man with shrapnel embedded in his chest and an elderly woman whose family had fled, abandoning her in Khan Yunis.

There was opposition on the Palestinian side to injured civilians receiving treatment in Israel thus the hospital stayed almost empty. Hamas fired ten mortar shells at the hospital.
