= Princess Bee =

Italian singer-songwriter

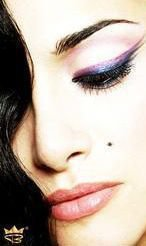
Princess Bee

Benedetta Paravia, also known by her stage name Princess Bee, is an Italian-born artist, singer-songwriter, philanthropist, journalist, author, presenter, director, and producer active across Europe and the Middle East, especially in the U.A.E. She has initiated numerous projects in the fields of education, entertainment, fashion, art, cinema and culture. She is the only living artist to have received the patronage of UNESCO (2008) for her peace anthem “Angels.”

Her humanitarian commitment has been recognized with two Medals of Merit awarded by the Presidents of the Italian Republic, Giorgio Napolitano and Sergio Mattarella, as well as two Italian Red Cross honours, of which one was signed by the National President, Rosario Valastro, who also awarded her the First Class Medal for her outstanding humanitarian service.

She is also a Golden Visa holder in the United Arab Emirates, recognized as a “person of exceptional talent and pioneering achievement.”

Since the 2023 is the Founder and Director of "La Dolce Via Festival", the first cinematic culture festival between Italy and the United Arab Emirates, designed to empower emerging Emirati talents through masterclasses, workshops, and advanced training programs led by leading Italian film professionals. The initiative, officially presented in the UAE during the Vespucci Ship Tour and Villaggio Italia, has received the auspices of the U.A.E. Ministry of Foreign Affairs, the patronage of the Italian Ministry of Foreign Affairs and International Cooperation (MAECI), the Ministry of Culture (MIC), the Ministry of Tourism, and the Lazio Region, along with the collaboration under the Auspices of the Embassy of Italy in the U.A.E. and major Emirati universities. The Festival serves as a cultural and industrial bridge between the two countries, promoting co-productions, academic exchange and the development of the Emirati audiovisual sector through Italian excellence.

== Charitable and educational work ==
In 2005, she organized and directed the "U.A.E. - Italy Economic Partnership Forum" in Fiera Milano Congressi Center to strength the political, economical and business relationship between the United Arab Emirates and Italy. The forum was opened by H.H. Shaikha Lubna Khalid Al Qasimi, U.A.E. Minister of Economy and Planning; H.E. Adolfo Urso, Italian Minister of Foreign Trade and Deputy Minister of Productive Activities and several Italian and Emirati authorities with the participation of the Presidents of the Chambers of Commerce of both countries.

She was the youngest main speaker at the International conference "Women as global leaders" opened by Queen Rania of Jordan at its first edition and in the following editions. Since 2005, she is the Project Manager of "The Intercultural Project", an educational program made for Emirati students which supports Emiratization with the Patronage of the U.A.E. Ministry of Higher Education and Scientific Research, the Embassy of Italy in the U.A.E. and the U.A.E. Embassy in Italy.

In 2008, she co-founded A.N.G.E.L.S. - National Association of Great Energies Leading Solidarity, a humanitarian not-for-profit organization for taking care in Italy of sick children living in areas afflicted by the war. Initially, many of these children came from Gaza crossing Erez which was opened by the Israeli authorities in collaboration with the Italian Ministry of Foreign Affairs. The honorary President of Angels Onlus is Her Royal Highness Princess Al Johara Al Saud. In 2010 in the Campidoglio in Rome, she officially launched her international initiative "Music for Solidarity" inviting artists in the music industry to contribute to the humanitarian causes.

In 2008 she created a symbolic jewel for charity called "Brotherhood" representing the symbols of the 3 monotheistic religions in chronological order, to remember that Jews, Christians and Muslims are all descending from Patriarch Abraham. She has been a staunch supporter of Middle East peace and stability.

In 2010, she renewed the Al Amal orphanage in Gaza with the support of the italian Presidency of the Council of Ministers. In 2013 she was appointed international goodwill ambassador of the Al Noor Training Center for Children with Special Needs donated by the ruler of Dubai Shaikh Mohammed bin Rashid Al Maktoum by the benefaction of his wife Princess Haya bint Al Hussein of Jordan. She was volunteering for a year, accomplishing the mission of bringing new donations to the institution. She has been supported by main Italian authorities and personalities to become Ambassador of UNESCO for Italy.

In March 2023 she launched her inclusive fashion capsule collection “Princess Bee” in Yamamay shops dedicated to the skin color of every woman.

== TV ==
In 2018, she wrote and produced "Hi Dubai", a cross media format revealing the “soul of the city” through the life and work experience of 25 Emirati and expat women. The series also promoted the Emirate’s lifestyle and main events to attract young people to visit and to live in Dubai. "Hi Dubai" was on air on the national channel Dubai One TV, in prime time, after the National News during the U.A.E. National Day’s week; then distributed online on Dubai Post and in-flight on ICE in all flights for the airline Emirates.

In 2019, she produced the second TV, web and in-flight series "Hi Emirates", dedicated to the ancestors women achievers of the U.A.E. as a tribute to Sheikha Fatma bint Mubarak, known as Umm al Emaraat. The series is also showcasing the amenities and the tourism attraction of the 7 Emirates. She is considered by the Arab media as an active factor of the "Arab global Renaissance". During the Expo 2020 Dubai, UAE she was the only one news correspondent for the Italian newspaper La Repubblica and for the web TV RepTV. She witnessed and wrote about the first time of the Israel’s participation in Expo in an Arab country, as well as the new socio-geo-political structure of the Arab Region following the Abraham Accords.

In September 2022, she filmed in Napoli the artistic-cultural-humanitarian project “Women in Love”, through which she fights the crime of Female Genital Mutilation. In October of the same year, she received the "Best Project 2022 for Women Empowerment" award for this at the House of Lords in London.

From 2 to 23 December 2022, at Palazzo Bembo in Venice, she exhibited “Women in Love”: the first video exhibition dedicated to the battle against Female Genital Mutilation (FGM) organized by Angels Onlus (National Association of Great Energies Leading Solidarity) . The 7 videos exhibited are part of the "Force of Nature" collection and portray the pinnacle of female ecstasy as opposed to the crime (FGM) against humanity. The proceeds from the sale of the works are intended to donate free surgical operations to the victims of mutilations for the restoration, including aesthetic, of the status quo. The exhibition then stopped in Rome, Dubai and London and saw the participation, in the Chamber of Deputies, of Ministers and parliamentarians in solidarity with the humanitarian cause whose international day is February 6.

== Music ==
In 2006, she wrote the lyrics of the song "Angels", the first and the only one song which has received the patronage of UNESCO as "of fundamental importance for peace and solidarity between populations". The song also received the patronage of the Holy See and the Medal of the President of the Italian Republic Giorgio Napolitano.

In 2010, she released the single "Shock me", a song inspired by a personal experience: the story of a guy jealous and obsessed of his girlfriend who then starts to hate her. "Shock me" video clip has been on air on MTV Arabia, Melody Hits TV and Ghanam. It has been awarded at the 67th Venice Film Festival during the event "Il cinema incontra la musica".

In October 2010, the video clip was awarded during the 8th edition of "Roma Video Clip". Starting from October 2010, "Shock me" was on air on MTV Italia.

January 1, 2012 she released the single "Touch my skin" through iTunes, Amazon, Google Music, Facebook and Last.FM. In September 2012 she released the single "Loving heart" a tribute to Rome, the Eternal city. The song talks about a teen confused by the choice between two guys, one rich and spoiled and one simple but truly able to love her.

In 2014, she released the new single, "Emaraat", a song she dedicated to the United Arab Emirates which was the first international tribute for the country in memory of Shaikh Zayed bin Sultan Al Nahyan, founder and first President of the UAE. The song was released in November 2014, before the National day and is a duetto with Emirati singer Harbi Al Amri and has been produced in Fayez Al Saeed studio in Dubai by Hussam Kamil. The Arabic lyrics are written by the Emarati National poet Ali Al Khawar. For two months, Emaraat has been unbeaten bestseller in the Virgin Megastores for both categories Arabic and International.

In December 2020, in Cairo, she released with Mazzika Records, "Tres Veces Latio", a remix in Spanish-Arabic of the Abu’s famous song "3Daqat". The video clip she directed was filmed in Italy immediately after the end of the Covid-19 lockdown.

In January 2022, she launched with Guy Manoukian "Only Dubai", a song dedicated to Dubai after her 20 years of love for the city by Sony Columbia. The song has been the theme song of the Dubai Fashion season in March 2022.

== Awards ==
• 2001 – Gold Medal of the Argentine Artists of the "Borges" Cultural Center Museum in Buenos Aires Aires for the pictorial work "March 5, 2001"

• 2002 – Bagliori d’Artista Award for the pictorial work "March 5, 2001"

• 2003 – Medal of the Lazio Region for the poem "Solitude"

• 2008 – Medal of the President of the Republic Giorgio Napolitano for the song of peace "Angels" dedicated to children victims of war.

• 2008 – UNESCO patronage for the peace song “Angels” judged to be “of fundamental importance for peace and solidarity among peoples”.

• 2008 – Patronage of the Holy See for the song of peace "Angels", considered "a song of innocents from Heaven".

• 2009 – Award for the social within the Rome Video clip Festival of Cinecittà for the song of peace "Angels".

• 2010 – "Cinema meets music" Award as part of the 67th edition of the Festival del Cinema of Venice for the video clip of the song “Shock me”.

• 2015 – Sharjah Electricity, Water and Gas Authority, U.A.E. Social Conscience Token of Appreciation

• 2018 – Golden Palm, Ajman Society, U.A.E.

• 2021 – Khalifa Empowerment Program – Medal of Appreciation in Expo2020, Dubai, U.A.E.

• 2022 – Premio "Guido Dorso" at Senate of the Republic with the Medal of the President of the Italian Republic Sergio Mattarella

• 2022 – Global Women Leaders Conference, London, U.K. – Awarded in the House of Lords for the “Best Project for Women Empowerment” (Women in Love)

• 2023 – Award "Art d'Or" in the Campidoglio, Rome, Italy

• 2023 - Honor of Merit conferred by the Italian Red Cross – Campania Committee, signed by President Stefano Tancredi, for her distinguished support of the 2023 Christmas fundraising campaign.

• 2025 - Honor of Merit and First Class Medal from the Italian Red Cross – National Committee, signed by President Rosario Valastro, in recognition of her outstanding artistic and humanitarian achievements of the highest distinction.
