= Erez Crossing =

Border crossing on the northern end of the Gaza Strip

Erez Crossing מעבר ארז معبر بيت حانون
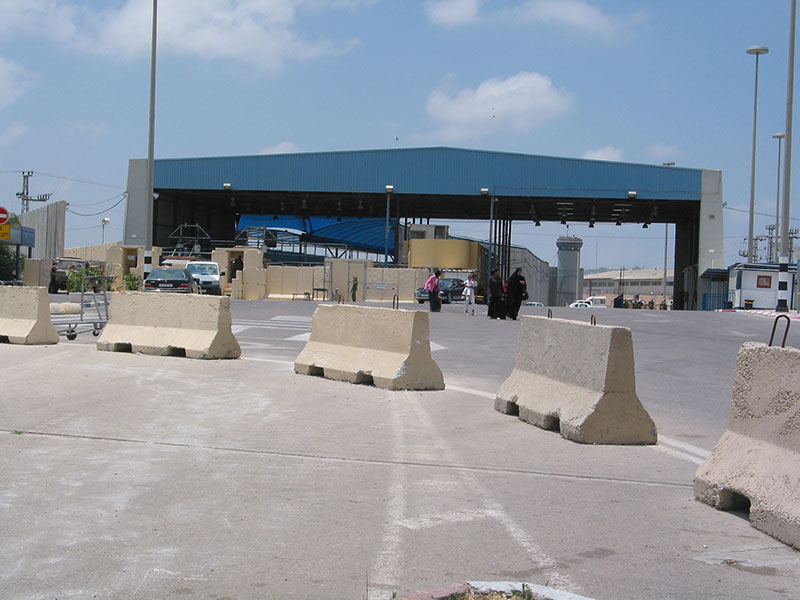
- Coordinates: 31°33′29.52″N 34°32′41″E
- Carries: Pedestrians
- Crosses: Israeli Gaza Strip barrier
- Locale: Erez; Beit Hanoun
- Other name: Beit Hanoun Crossing
- Maintained by: Israel Defense Forces

Location
- Interactive map of Erez Crossing

The Erez Crossing (Hebrew: מעבר ארז), also known as the Beit Hanoun Crossing (Arabic: معبر بيت حانون), is a border crossing between the Gaza Strip and Israel. It is located at the northern end of the Gaza Strip, between the Israeli kibbutz of Erez and the Palestinian city of Beit Hanoun.

Presently, it is the sole crossing point for individuals (as opposed to cargo) between the Gaza Strip and Israel by land, and is the second option for Gazans when the Rafah Crossing with Egypt is closed. Usage of the Erez Crossing is restricted to Palestinians living under the jurisdiction of the Palestinian National Authority, Egyptian citizens and nationals, and international aid officials. Israel permits Palestinian residents to travel via Erez in "exceptional humanitarian cases" with other exceptions in place for students and sportsmen travelling abroad, as well as merchants. The Erez Crossing is managed by the Israel Defense Forces, unlike the Karni Crossing and the Kerem Shalom Crossing that are both managed by the Israel Airports Authority. The blockade of the Gaza Strip has had a significant impact on the crossing point, which is an opening in the Israeli Gaza Strip barrier.

== Facilities ==
The terminal is a modern hangar-style building with an area of about 35,000 m^{2} (375,000 sq ft) and a capacity for handling 45,000 people per day. It was completed in 2007 at a cost of $60 million.

== Location ==
The Erez Crossing is part of a complex that formerly included the Erez Industrial Park. The Crossing connects Israel's Highway 4 with Gaza's Salah al-Din Road. Until the early 1970s, a railway line connecting Israel and the Gaza Strip also passed through the Crossing. Today, the railway has been dismantled in the Gaza Strip, and on the Israeli side Israel Railways' active railway line ends about 4.5 km northeast of the crossing, though in the future it may be re-extended to the Crossing to provide cargo service to the Gaza Strip.

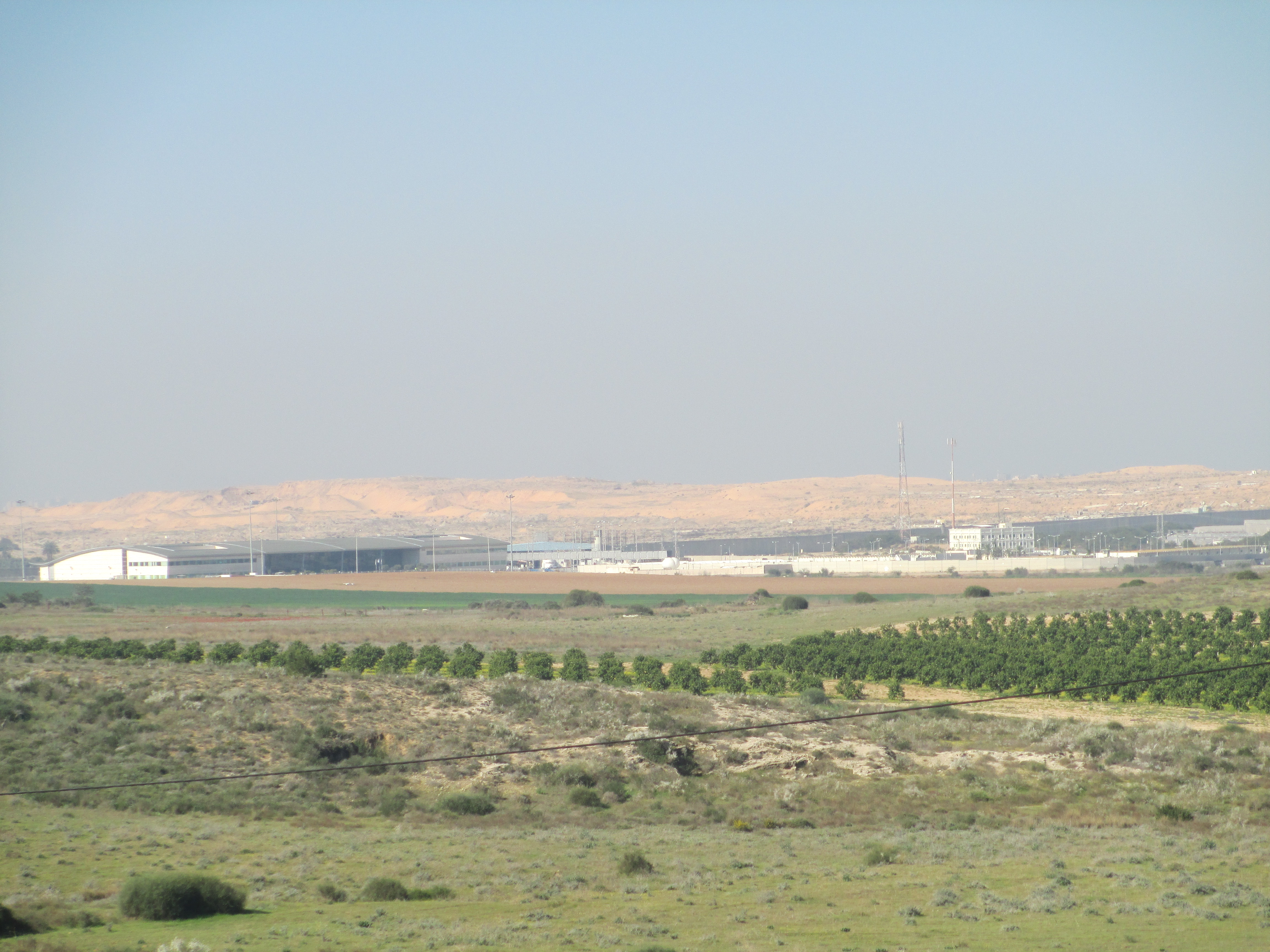
Erez crossing viewed from kibbutz Erez.

== Movements ==
Until September 2000, more than 26,000 Palestinian residents were able to travel to and through Israel daily (some 800,000 per month). After the start of the Second Intifada, this number dropped to less than 900 per day. In 2004, there were 43,440 crossings at Erez into Israel monthly, on average. After the Hamas takeover of Gaza, the number dropped to 2,175 in 2008. After the Israel–Hamas ceasefire in 2014, the number increased to 15,000 per month in 2015.

According to Gisha, 15,388 Palestinians used the Erez Crossing in January 2016 out of Gaza, the sole crossing. Of those, 2,896 were patients and their companions, 8,183 were merchants, and 4,309 were "others".

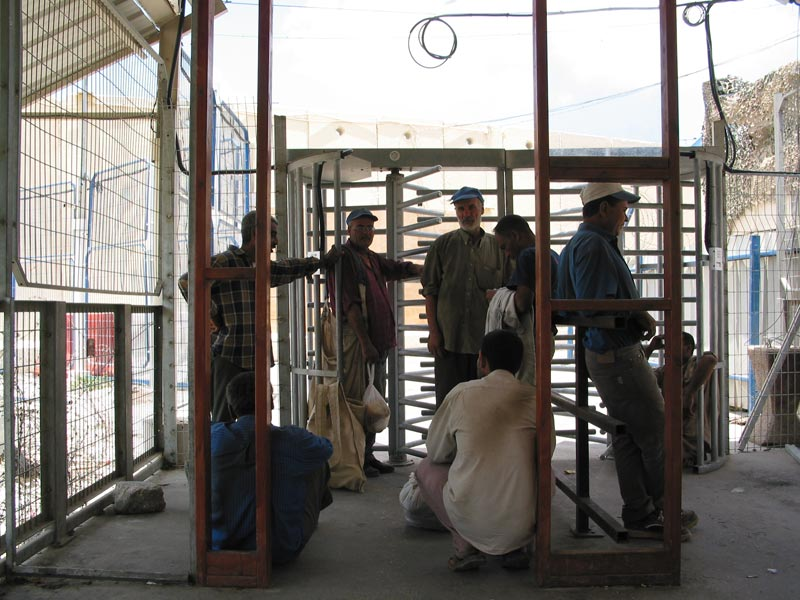
Palestinian workers wait at the Erez Crossing to enter the Gaza Strip, July 2005.

== Gaza–Israel conflict ==
=== 2014 ===
On 20 July 2014, in response to reports that the 2014 Gaza War had caused a dire shortage of hospital beds in Gaza, the Israel Defense Forces opened IDF field hospital for Gazans at Erez Crossing.

=== 2015 ===
In April 2015, Al-Monitor wrote that Gazans are increasingly complaining about being blackmailed by Israeli security and intelligence services seeking to recruit Palestinian spies, by exploiting their need for work, money, medical treatment or travel. According to Col. Mohammed Abu Harbeed, information security specialist at the Gaza Interior Ministry, 70-80% of citizens passing through the Crossing were subject to recruitment attempts by Israel in 2014. He said they include merchants, patients, Gazans who are traveling for leisure purposes and students studying at foreign universities. A father of a seven-year-old boy who wanted to cross through Erez for chemotherapy in an Israeli hospital was blackmailed by an Israeli officer. The father said the Israeli officer offered payment for a treatment in exchange for spying for Israel. After he had rejected the offer, he was denied an entry permit. Al Mezan Center for Human Rights in Gaza revealed in September 2013 similar practices of arrest or pressure to let Gazans "choose between spying or returning to Gaza where they could die". A Gazan merchant traveling via the Erez Crossing was offered financial support and significant tax benefits in exchange for giving him information on the security headquarters in Gaza.

A woman who was sick and needed treatment was denied a travel request to the West Bank because she had a Jordanian passport, not a Palestinian one.

In April 2015, Euro-Med Human Rights Monitor reported an increasing number of Palestinian businessmen being detained while seeking to cross into Israel via the Erez Crossing for routine trips. Israeli interrogators ask them questions about occupational backgrounds, social interactions and their affiliation with political parties. The human rights group found that intelligence operatives frequently attempt to force businessmen to disclose alleged information about armed factions within Gaza. They are humiliated and treated inhumanely and if they refuse to collaborate, their entry permits are taken away.

=== 2016 ===
Also, Human Rights and Democracy Media Centre (SHAMS) reported in January 2016, that Israel uses the Erez Crossing as a trap for Palestinian passengers. According to SHAMS, Israeli intelligence questions most of the Palestinian passengers with permits to use the crossing. The kidnapping of tens of passengers by Israel after questioning them was reported, some of them patients.

=== 2023-present ===
During the October 7 attacks, as part of the Gaza war, Hamas's military wing the Al-Qassam Brigades took temporary control of the Erez Crossing, causing hundreds of Palestinian civilians to make their way to the crossing. The attack caused damage to the facilities at the crossing, and the Erez Crossing remained closed during the ensuing war until 1 May 2024, when it was reopened for aid transports heading into Gaza.

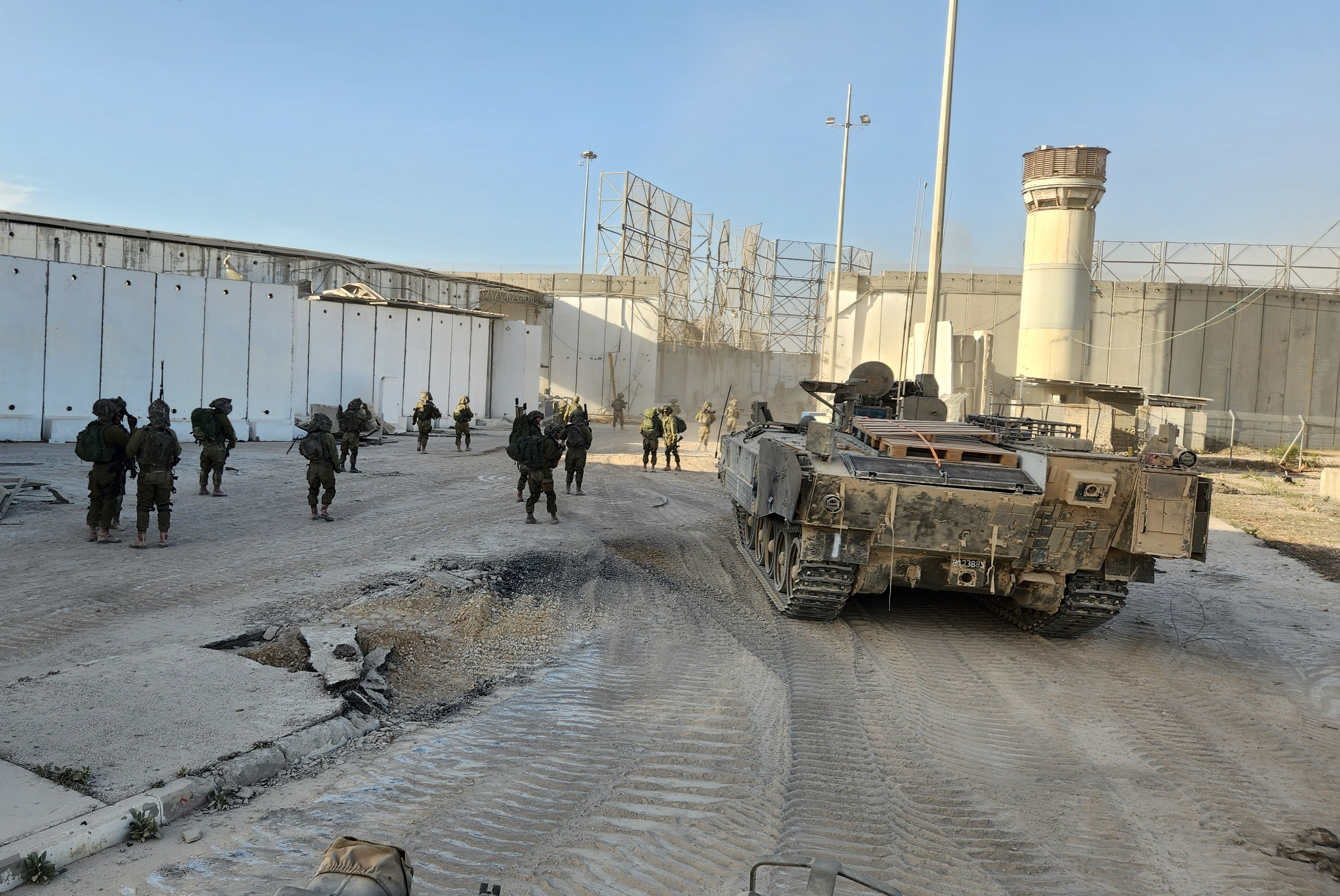
Israeli soldiers at the Erez Crossing during the Gaza war, November 10, 2023

== See also ==
- Erez
- 2004 Erez Crossing bombing
- Daraj Tuffah
- Rafah
