= Erez =

Kibbutz in southern Israel

Erez: ארז (Hebrew); إيرز (Arabic)
- Kibbutz
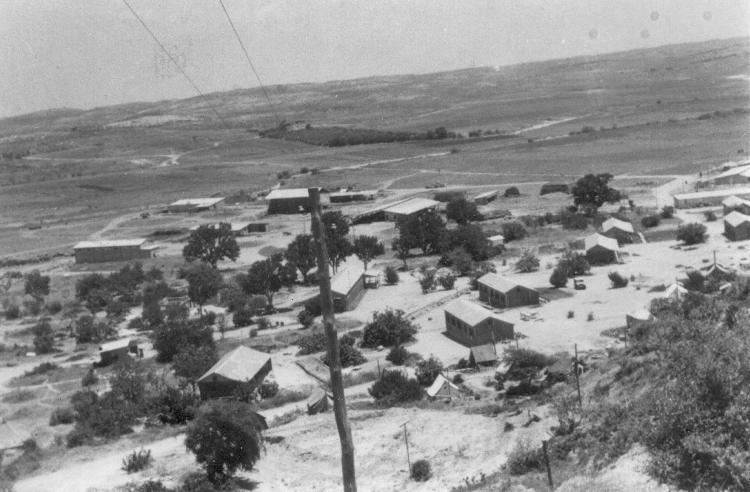
- Erez in early 1949

- Location within Ashkelon region of Israel Location within Israel
- Coordinates: 31°33′36″N 34°33′58″E
- Country: Israel
- District: Southern
- Subdistrict: Ashkelon
- Council: Shaʽar HaNegev
- Affiliation: Kibbutz Movement
- Founded: 1949 (original location); 1950 (current location)
- Founder: Noar HaOved Members
- Population (2024): 699
- Website: www.erez.org.il

Erez (Hebrew: אֶרֶז, lit. 'cedar') is a kibbutz in southwestern Israel. Located just 1 kilometre (0.62 mi) north of the Gaza Strip, it is the namesake of the nearby Erez Crossing.

The kibbutz was founded in 1949 and moved to its current location in 1950. In 2019, it had a population of 558.

Located in the northwestern Negev around 18 kilometres (11 mi) south of the coastal city of Ashkelon, it falls under the jurisdiction of the Shaʽar HaNegev Regional Council.

== History ==
Erez is named after the first group that settled the kibbutz, who were members of the Noar HaOved from Petah Tikva. It was founded in 1949.

Archaeological discoveries from Erez include a statue of a griffin with a Greek dedication by a priest, dating to 210/211 AD. Additionally, fragments of Greek inscriptions, one potentially Latin, have been found here.

=== 1948 Arab-Israeli war ===
Before the founding of the kibbutz, the Palestinian village of Dimrah (Arabic: دمرة) existed on the same land, with a population of 520 in 1945. On October 31, 1948, during the 1948 Arab–Israeli War, the village evacuated all women and children. Nothing specific is known of when the men left. However, the Arab Liberation Army often required men to stay and fight alongside its armed forces, all of whom would have been forced to withdraw if, as at Dimra, they were defeated.

=== 2023 Hamas attack ===
On 7 October 2023, the kibbutz was attacked in the opening stage of the Gaza war. The kibbutz security team repulsed the attack in an hours-long battle, losing one of its members, Amir Naim. Two others were injured and received treatment outside the kibbutz.

The kibbutz's security team assembled to prevent the Hamas soldiers from entering the kibbutz through the main gate. After contacting the IDF they were informed that no help would be coming. A firefight involving rifles, grenades, and RPGs ensued.

The whole kibbutz was evacuated to a hotel in Mitzpe Ramon. After several weeks, makeshift schools were established. Since then the kibbutz's population was relocated to Kiryat Gat.

== Economy ==
The kibbutz has three main industries: agriculture (arable and fruit farming as well as animal husbandry), manufacturing (Erez Thermoplastics Products manufactures plastic-covered materials), and research and development.

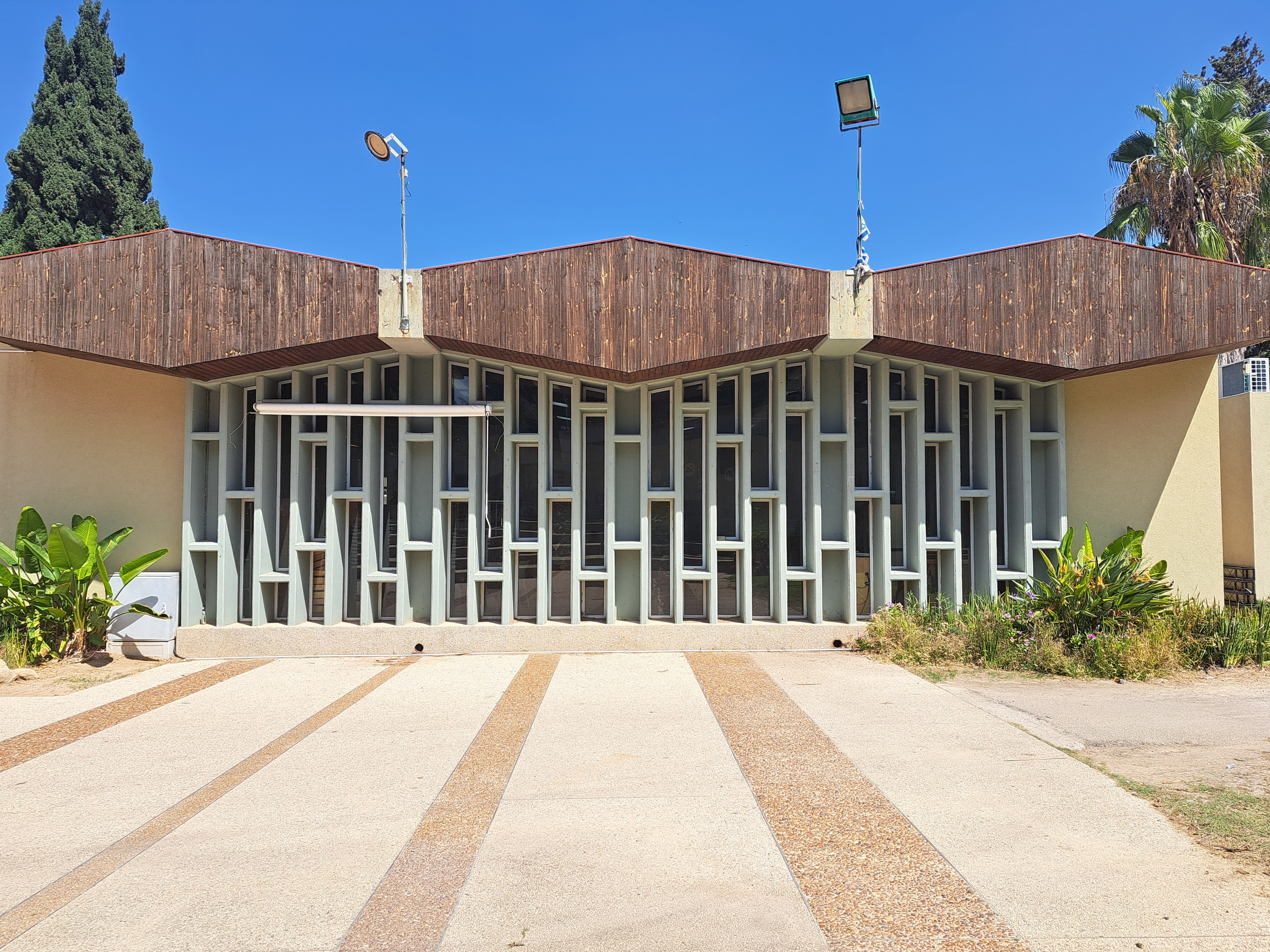
The Dining Room

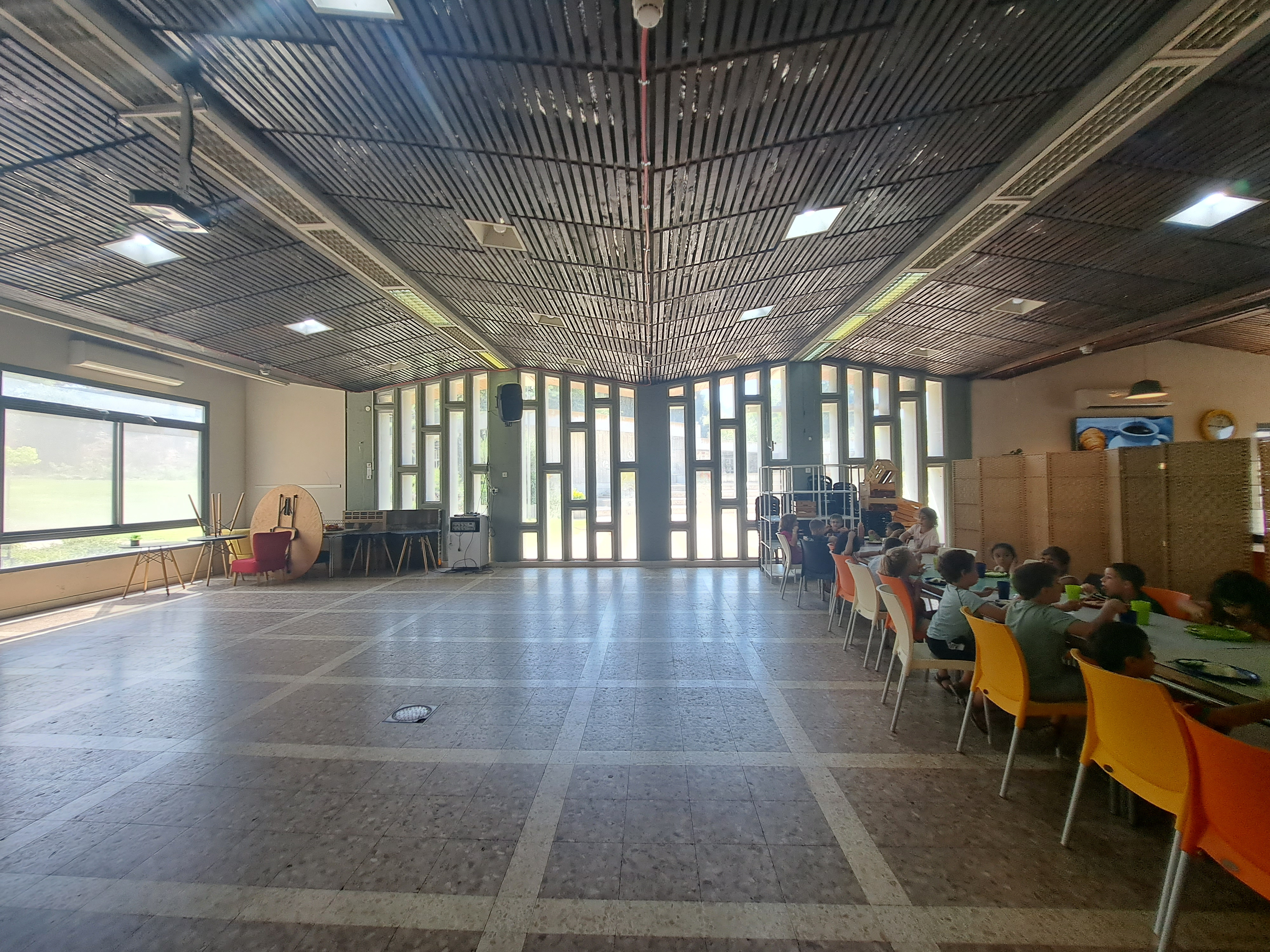
The Dining Room

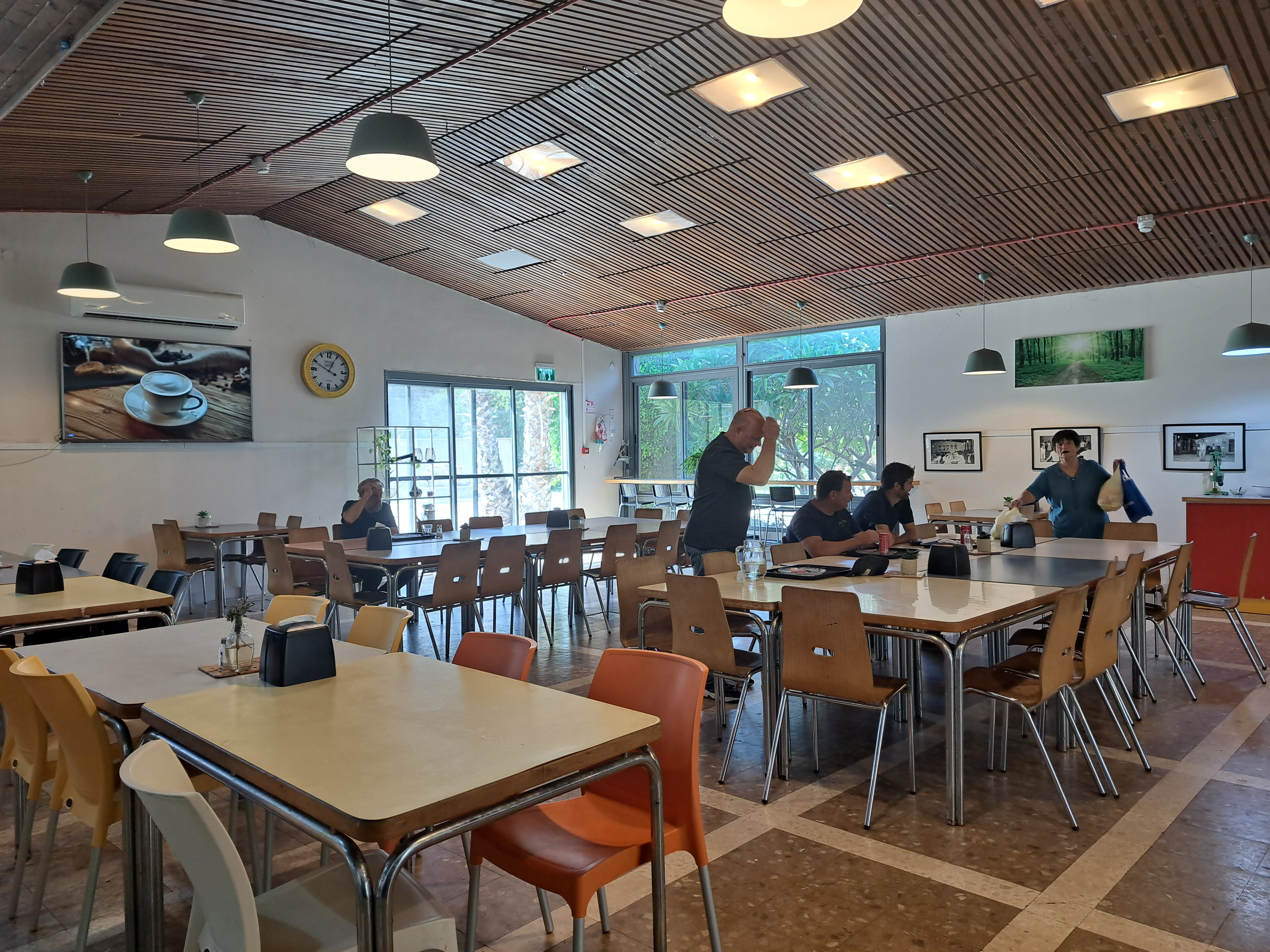
The Dining Room

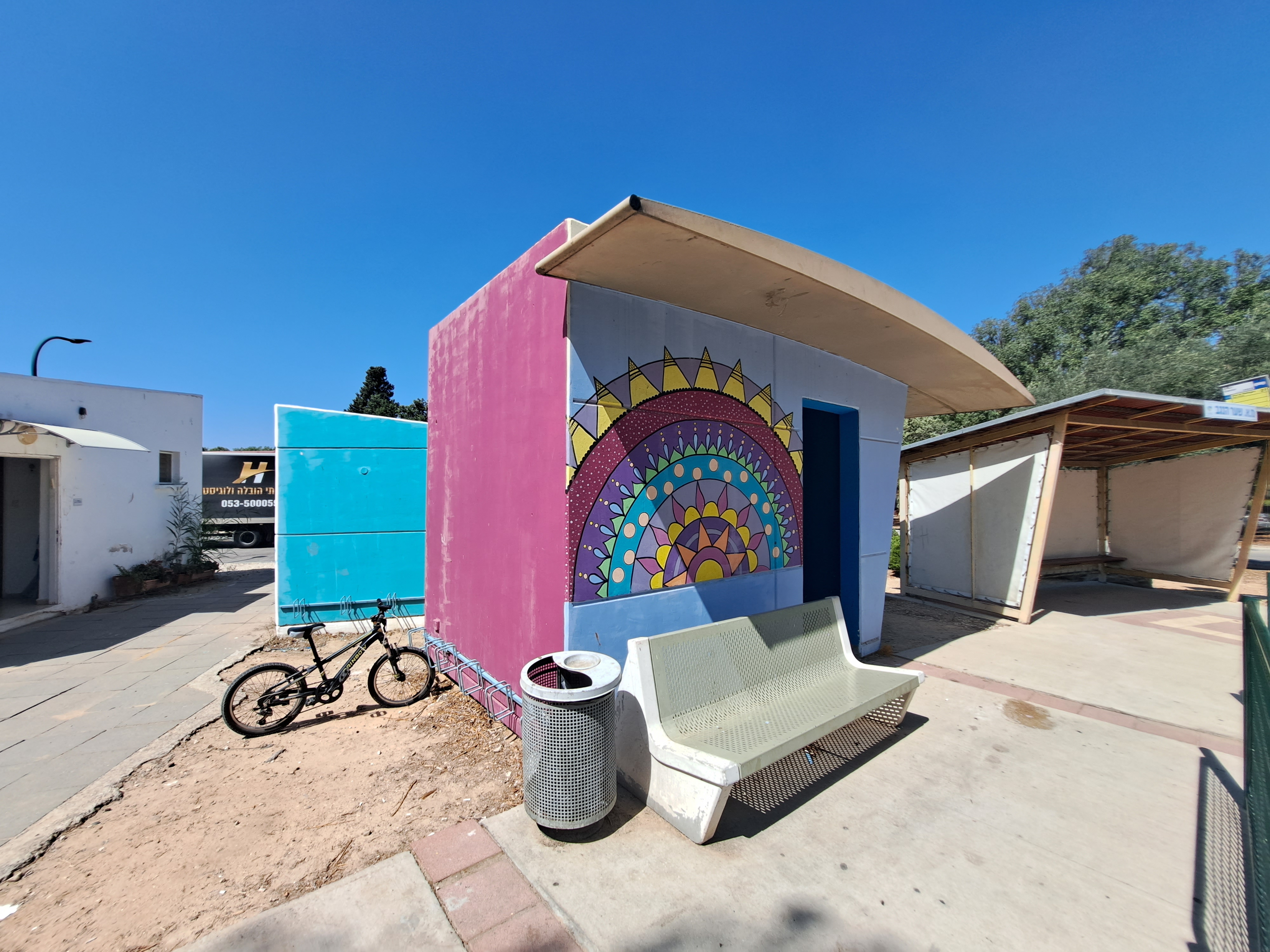
Protected space near the dining room

== Notable people ==
- Keren Neubach

== See also ==
- Erez Crossing, a border crossing point between Israel and the Palestinian Gaza Strip
