= Shira Banki's Way =

Israeli non-profit organization

- דרך שירה בנקי
- Formation: 2016
- Founder: Mika and Uri Banki
- Location: Tel Aviv, Israel
- Region served: Israel
- Website: https://www.sbw.org.il/

Shira Banki's Way (Hebrew: דרך שירה בנקי) is a non-profit organization whose goal is to promote moderation and discourse in Israeli society. The organization was established by the parents of Shira Banki, who was murdered at the Jerusalem gay pride parade in 2015.

Shira Banki's parents lit a torch on Israel's Independence Day in 2022 for their work.

== Shira Banki ==
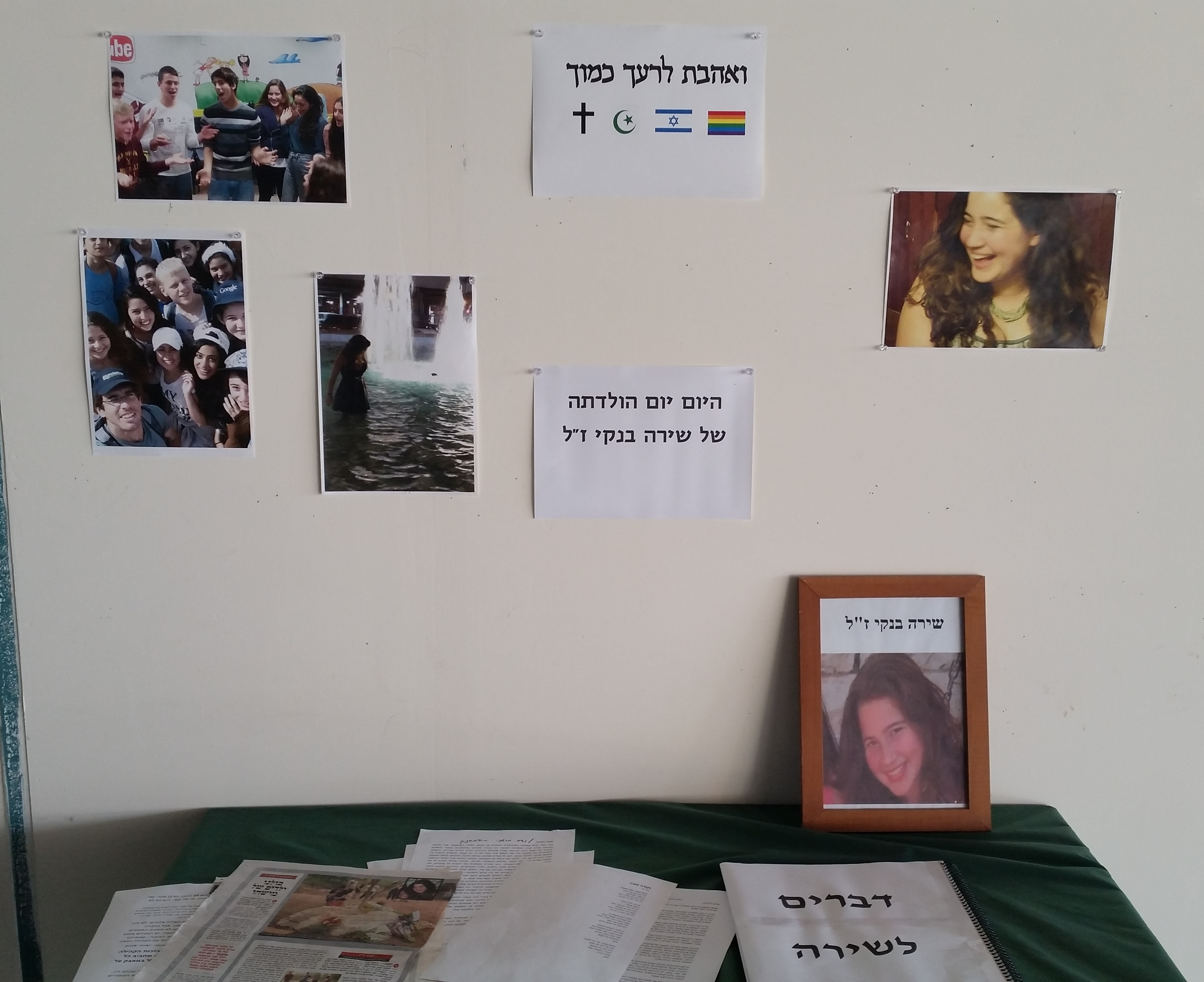

Shira Banki (1 November 1999 – 30 July 2015) was a young Israeli woman who, on July 30, 2015, was stabbed to death by Yishai Schlissel during the 2015 Jerusalem gay pride parade. Schlissel also wounded 5 others in the attack. He had only been recently released after serving his sentence for attempted murder at the 2005 Jerusalem pride parade. Banki died at the hospital from her injuries, and Schlissel received life in prison for her murder.

== History ==
Several months after Banki's murder, her parents, Mika and Uri, both of whom were lawyers, decided to found Shira Banki's Way in honor of their daughter.

In 2019, the organization co-sponsored dialogue circles in Tel Aviv following the fast day of Tisha B'Av.

During the COVID-19 pandemic lockdowns, many of the organization's events were cancelled or held on Zoom.

== Activities ==
=== Another Story ===
The organization, in collaboration with Yuval Malchi, created the podcast "Another Story - In Memory of Shira Banki", which tells the stories of exceptional historical figures who acted for the sake of the "other". The series has 16 episodes.

=== Dialogue Circles - "Meeting Point" ===
The organization holds dialogue circles between different groups in the Israeli population with the aim of promoting a discourse of tolerance and familiarity between different publics in Israel. Additionally, the "Managing Conflict in Israeli Society" project was established in collaboration with the Yitzhak Rabin Center and the Kativ Center, aimed at 10th grade students from various sectors, with the goal of bringing together youth from different backgrounds to strengthen the understanding that conflict in society should be managed through listening, emphasizing common elements, and recognizing the legitimate existence of disagreements.

=== Clinic for Combating Hate in the Public Sphere ===
The organization established the Clinic for Combating Hate in the Public Sphere, in collaboration with the Berl Katznelson Foundation and the Interdisciplinary Center Herzliya. The clinic deals with legal, psychological, cultural and social aspects of hate speech, violence and delegitimization of groups in society, and publishes position papers and legislative proposals to promote tolerance. Its goal is to make the fight against racism a broader public issue. The clinic operates the Center for Combating Hate, which centralizes the clinic's activities and serves as an address for victims of online violence, allowing anonymous reporting. The Clinic also offers "victims of incitement and racism" pro bono legal aid.

=== The Shira Program for Girls ===
The Shira Program for Girls is a mentoring program for girls aged 17-24 who have experienced difficult situations and distress. The program operates with a feminist approach.

It was established in 2015 and is managed by the Department of Projects of the Youth Advancement Division at the Jerusalem Municipality, in partnership with "Shira Banki Way" which promotes educational-value activities in the public sphere.

=== Teachers' Room - This is Jerusalem ===
The organization participates in a multi-sectoral teacher training program regarding the ability to accommodate and deal with multiculturalism in the city. Led by the Hebrew Union College in collaboration with the Jerusalem Municipality's Education Administration. Michal Moshkat-Baran serves as the academic director of the program and raises funds for it.
