= Jerusalem gay pride parade =

Annual LGBT event in Jerusalem

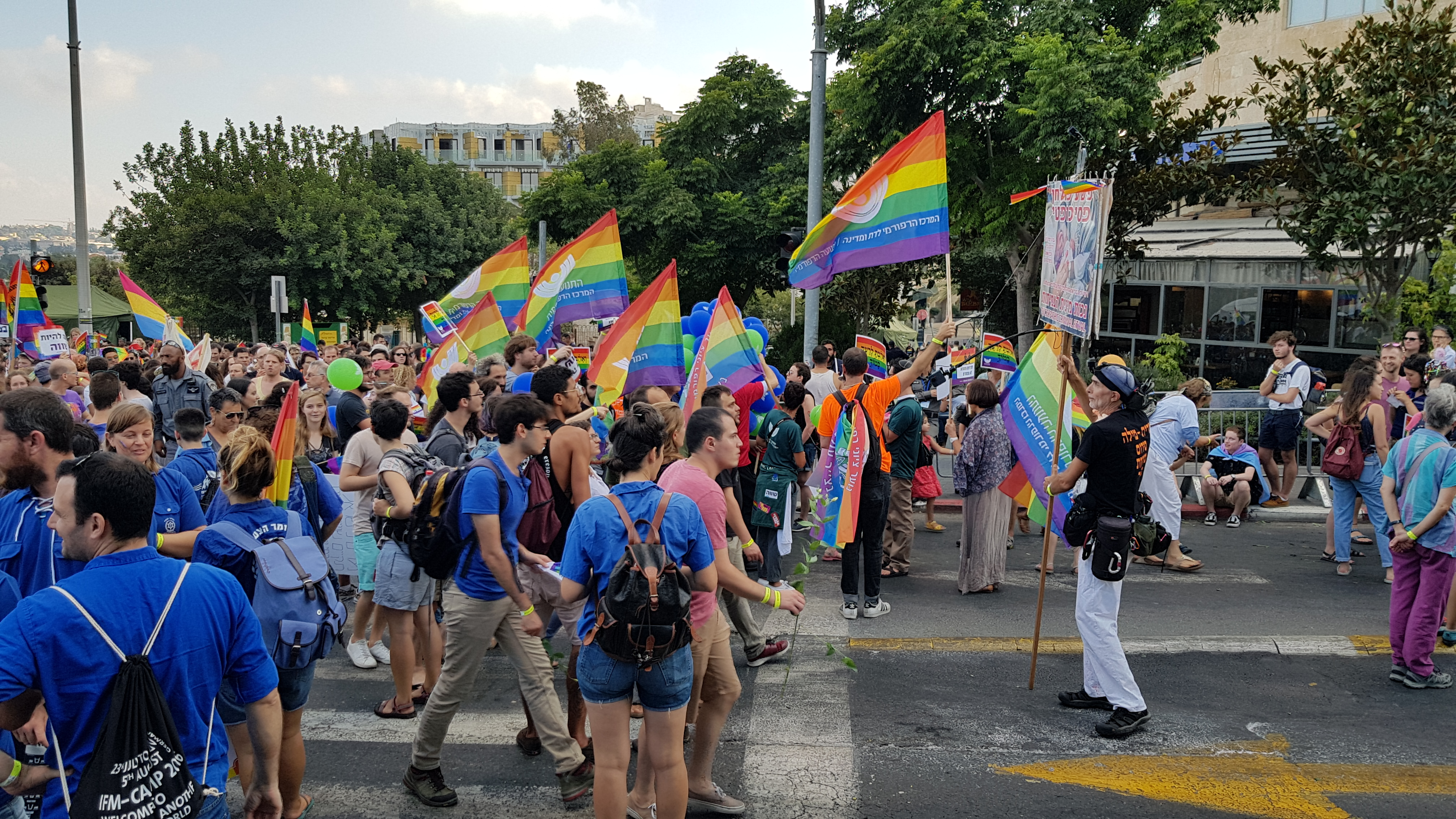
2018 Jerusalem gay pride parade

The Jerusalem gay pride parade (Hebrew: מצעד הגאווה והסובלנות בירושלים) is an annual pride parade taking place in Jerusalem. Since the first March for Pride and Tolerance in 2002, Jerusalem Pride—"Love Without Border"—has become an established event in Jerusalem.

In 2005 and 2015, Yishai Schlissel, a Haredi Jewish man stabbed marchers with a knife, resulting in three injuries (2005) and in six injuries, one fatal (2015). He was arrested and convicted for the 2005 attack, and released from imprisonment three weeks before the 2015 parade.

== Background ==
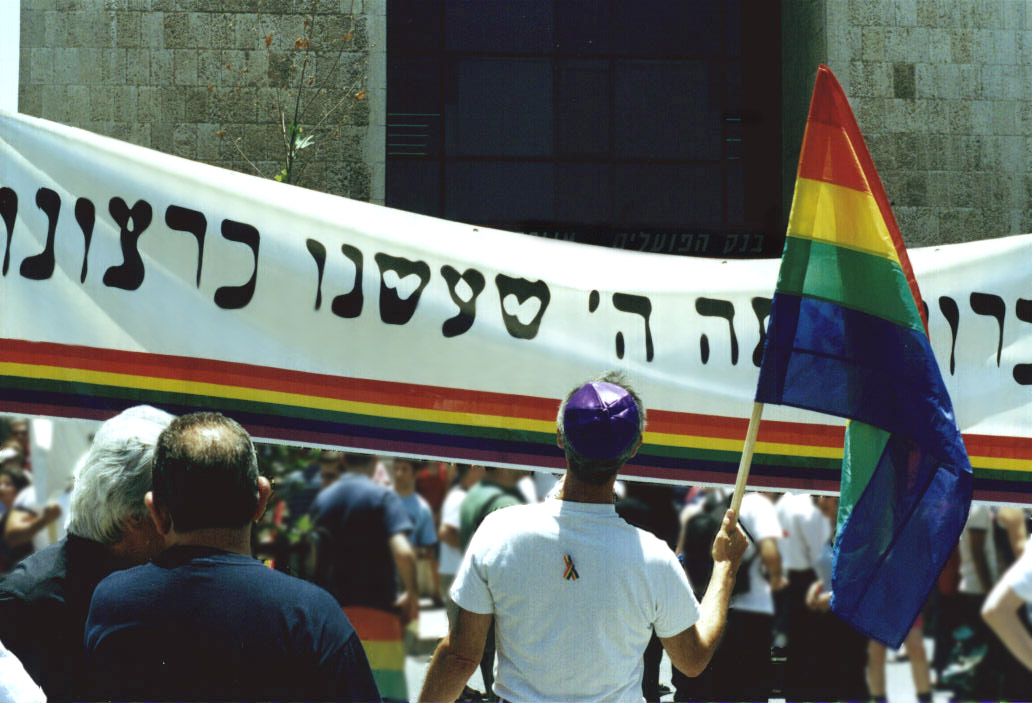
Jerusalem pride parade in 2008

Since the 1990s, an annual pride parade has taken place in Tel Aviv and sometimes also in Eilat. Tel Aviv had previously been the venue for the only yearly gay pride parade in the Middle East. Tel Aviv was the first city in Israel to have a gay pride parade, which started in the street of Shenkin and expanded to large-scale events in the following years. In 2005, 100,000 people participated in the Tel Aviv gay pride parade.

The Jerusalem Open House for Pride and Tolerance is the focal point of gay pride events in Jerusalem, and has existed since 1997. Since 2002, it has held small annual gay pride parades in Jerusalem.

In 2007, the Knesset approved legislation to prevent pride parades in Jerusalem, and in response, then-Prime Minister of Israel Ehud Olmert's office released a statement that he "does not think that Jerusalem is the appropriate location for holding gay-pride parades due to the special sensitive nature of the city, although he believes that such matters should not be limited by law". The legislation was again introduced in 2008, but again did not become law, and in June 2008, the Supreme Court of Israel denied petitions to stop gay pride parades in Jerusalem, and a parade was held in 2008 and in 2009.

== 2005 attack ==
In 2005, a municipal ban attempted to halt the parade, but it was overturned by a district court order. Protesters, many of them Orthodox Jews, lined the mile-long parade route shouting insults and displaying signs with messages such as "You are corrupting our children" and "Jerusalem is not San Francisco". During the parade, Yishai Schlissel, a Haredi Jew, stabbed three parade participants with a kitchen knife. During a police interrogation, he described the motive behind his actions: "I came to killing on behalf of God. We can't have such abomination in the country." The perpetrator was subsequently convicted of three counts of attempted murder, and sentenced to 12 years in prison. The Jerusalem District Court also ordered that NIS 280 million (about US$60 million) be paid as compensation to the victims. Schlissel was released in 2015, and returned to the Pride Parade in 2015 to attack again, stabbing a person to death and wounding six others.

== 2006 demonstrations ==
In 2006, it was announced that the WorldPride event held each year in different capitals or large cities of the world would come to Jerusalem. The 22nd annual conference of InterPride was held in October 2003 in Montreal, Quebec, Canada; with over 150 delegates from 51 cities from around the world in attendance, the conference voted to accept the bid of the Jerusalem Open House to host WorldPride 2006.

The parade was scheduled for 6 August, and received harsh objection from Israeli religious circles from the outset. It was eventually cancelled due to the 2006 Israel-Lebanon conflict, but a week of events did take place as scheduled and included five conferences, a film festival, exhibitions, and literary and political events. The parade itself was cancelled, but the Jerusalem Open House announced that it would hold a parade on 10 November after reaching an agreement with the police and with the municipality.

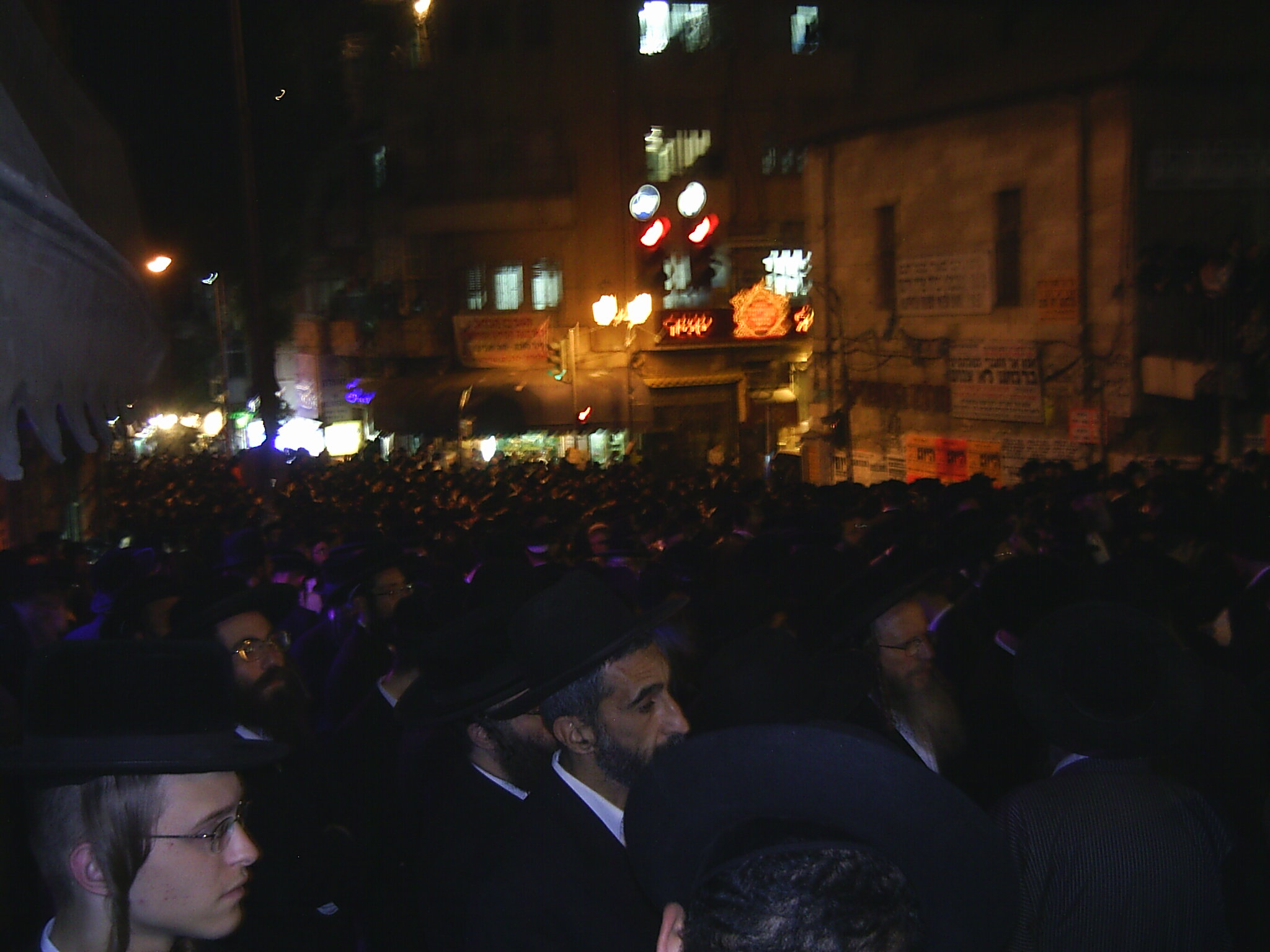
Crowd at a demonstration organized by the Edah HaChareidis. Jerusalem, 18 October 2006.

Virulent opposition from Haredi and other Orthodox Jewish corners, as well as from the Israeli Arab sector, has led many to believe that unless the gay pride parade was canceled, a violent outcome would be unavoidable. Others who came out against the parade include Sephardic Chief Rabbi of Israel, Grand Mufti of Jerusalem, Greek Orthodox Patriarch of Jerusalem, Armenian Patriarch of Jerusalem, Ethiopian Orthodox Bishop of Jerusalem, Rabbi Shlomo Amar and many others Orthodox Jews, Muslims and Christian clerics of Jerusalem and MK Yitzhak Levy.

The main opposition from the Haredi Jewish sector was organized by the Edah HaChareidis rabbinical organization. On 18 October, Rabbis from across the Orthodox spectrum called for the parade to be forbidden. Rabbi Ovadia Yosef, who was one of the first to express his opposition, called for a "demonstration of a million". Well-known right-wing Jewish activists Baruch Marzel, Itamar Ben-Gvir, and Hillel Weiss called for a "holy war" against the parade, and announced that unless the parade were cancelled, it would lead to violence. The organizers of the parade filed a police complaint against them, accusing them of incitement to murder.

On the night of Thursday, 2 November, a demonstration in Mea Shearim led to rioting. Thousands of protesters blocked roads with burning garbage cans, and police responded in force, sending hundreds of Yassam riot police and Border Police armed with batons, water cannons, and horses. Seven policemen and an unknown number of protestors were wounded. Haredi spokesmen strongly spoke out against the police for using an "excessive level of violence". On the night of 9 November, right-wing activists including Ben-Gvir and Jewish Home politician Bezalel Smotrich organized a "beast parade" with livestock and hundreds of haredi and right-wing activists, following the planned route of the pride parade.

The organizers of the Jerusalem Open House organization made plans to deal with contingencies, including multiple wounded and dead. Instead of a parade, the organizers moved the event to a stadium on a university campus, and the event went peacefully.

== 2015 attack ==
On 30 July 2015, only three weeks after being released, Yishai Schlissel stabbed six marchers during the Jerusalem gay pride parade. The act was widely condemned, including by Prime Minister Benjamin Netanyahu. One of the victims, 16-year-old Shira Banki, died of her wounds at the Hadassah Medical Center three days later, on 2 August 2015. Shortly after, Prime Minister Netanyahu offered his condolences, adding, "We will deal with the murderer to the fullest extent of the law." Schlissel's mother, Rivka, expressed her sorrow over her son actions and expressed solidarity with the victims, saying, "We regret this very much and pray for the immediate recovery of the victims." An investigation was launched to examine the failure to identify Schlissel, who was recently released, as a threat.

== After 2015 ==
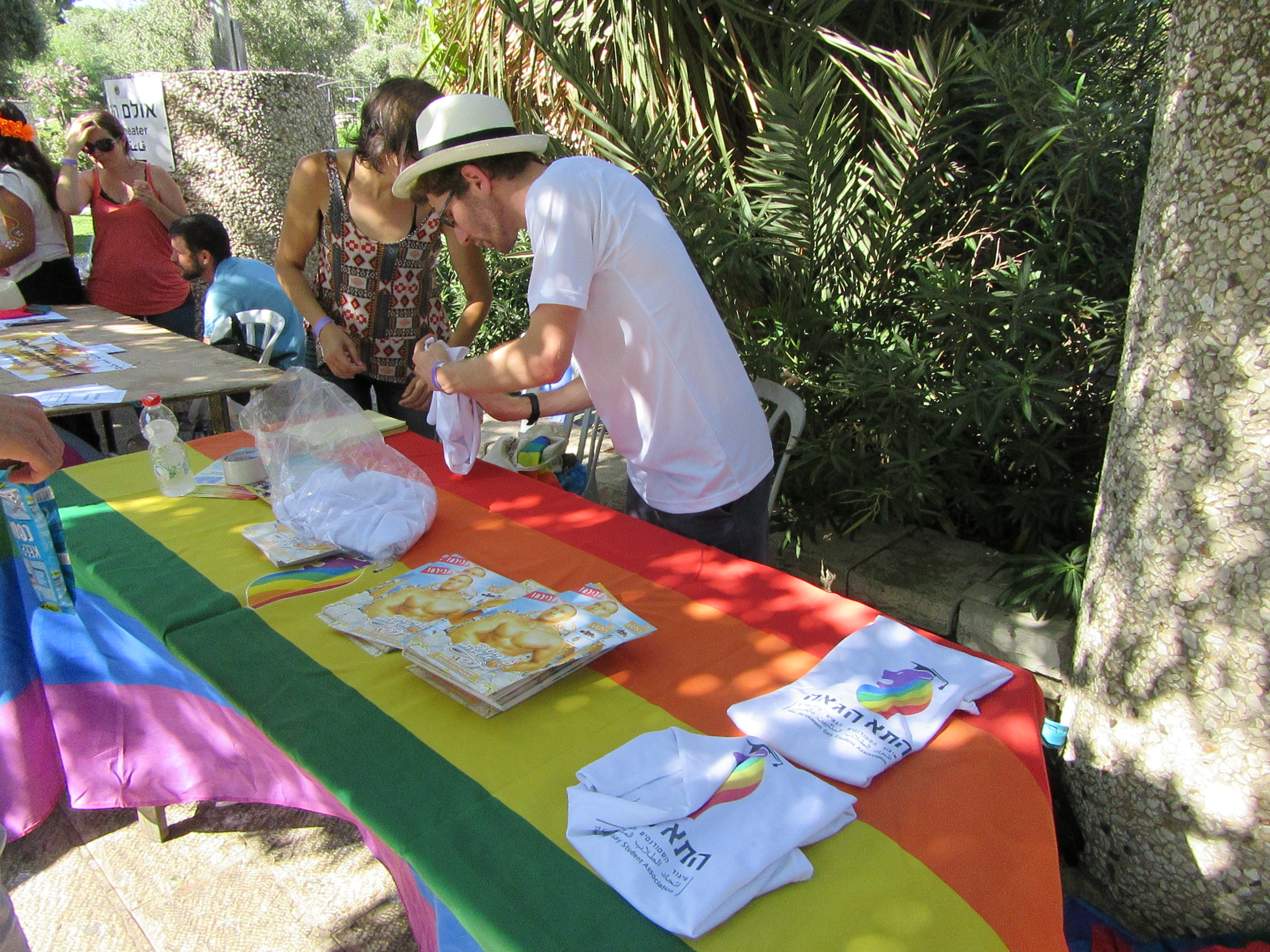
2016 Jerusalem gay pride

The number of pride participants after the 2015 attack was smaller than in years past.

In 2016, some 25,000 took part, many in solidarity with the LGBT community following the deadly stabbing attack.

In 2017, at least 22,000 marched in the parade. In 2018, at least 20,000 marched in the parade.

On 6 June 2019, around 15,000 people marched in Jerusalem's annual pride parade. Under tight security with a reported 2,500 security personnel. At least 49 people who wanted to violently disturb the event were arrested.

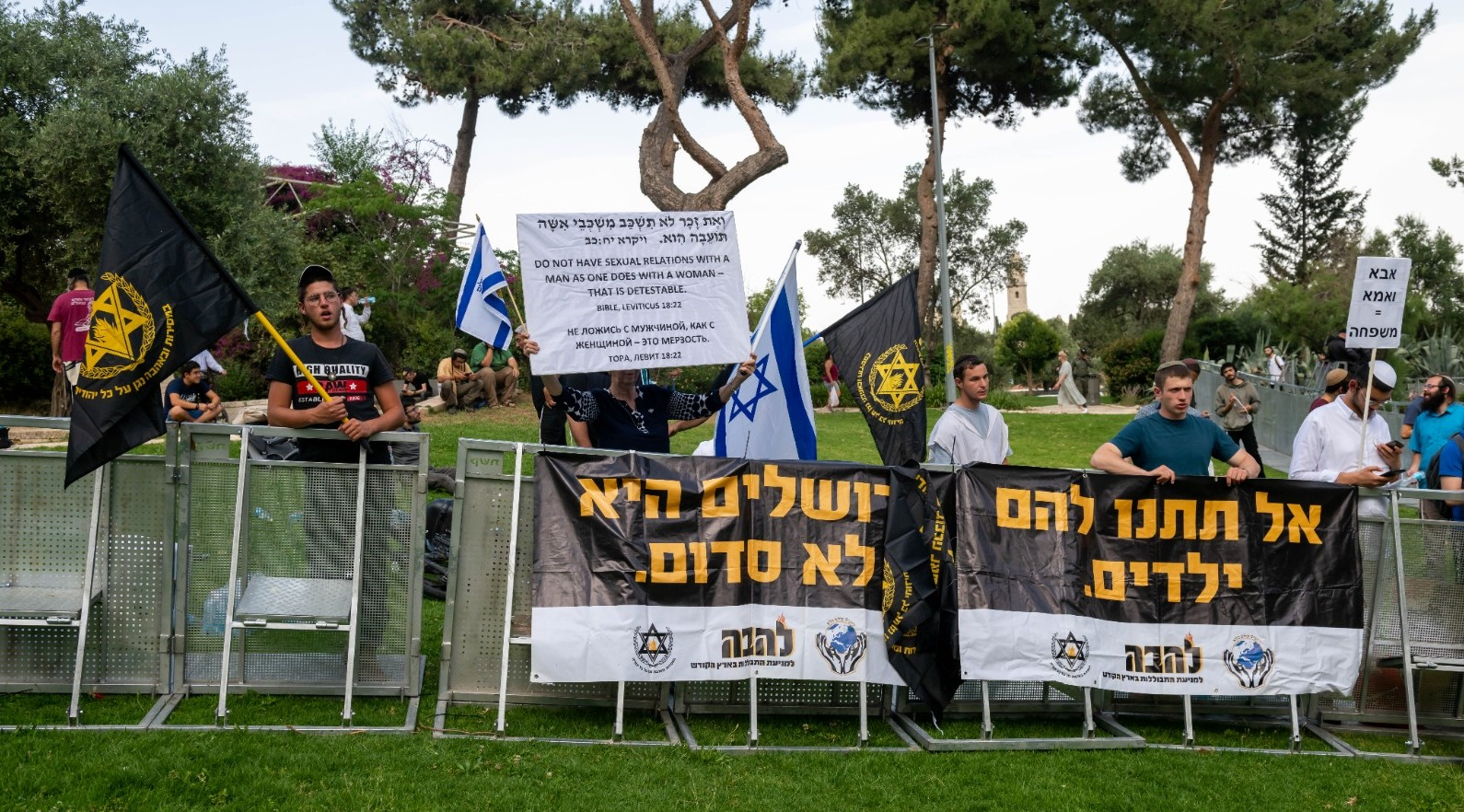
Lehava protest against Jerusalem gay pride parade 2023. Signs: "Don't give them children" and "Jerusalem is not Sedom"

The 2024 Jerusalem gay pride parade occurred amidst subdued surroundings due to the Gaza war. Approximately 2,000 police officers were deployed to ensure safety during the event. Unlike previous years, the event lacked its usual vibrant atmosphere with cheers and music. Organizers estimated around 10,000 participants, significantly fewer than the 30,000 reported in 2023.

In June 2026, the Jerusalem Municipality raised the Pride flag for the first time ever and hung Pride flags with the Hebrew inscription "equality in life" along the route from Sacher Park to the Knesset building to honour reservist Sagi Golan, who was killed in Be'eri during the Hamas attack on 7 October 2023.

== In film ==
Two films have been made about this event. Nitzan Giladi directed the 80-minute documentary Jerusalem Is Proud to Present, and Chutzpa Productions produced a 45-minute documentary short titled Pride. The pride is also feature in the 2014 film Kicking Out Shoshana.

== See also ==
- LGBTQ rights in Israel
- LGBTQ history in Israel
- Jewish views on homosexuality
