= Igal Hecht =

Israeli-Canadian documentary filmmaker

Igal Hecht is a documentary filmmaker. In 1999 he founded Chutzpa Productions, a production company.
