= Yishai Schlissel =

Israeli murder convict (born 1975)

- ישי שליסל
- Born: December 10, 1975 (age 50); Yad Binyamin, Israel
- Children: 4
- Motive: Jewish extremism
- Convictions: Attempted murder, aggravated assault, murder
- Penalty: 12 years in prison Payment of compensation in the amount of 280 000 NIS for the three victims Life plus 31 years in prison Payment of compensation in the amount of 2 064 000 NIS

Details
- Victims: 2005: 3 wounded 2015: 1 killed, 5 wounded

Yishai Schlissel (also spelled Shlisel; Hebrew: ישי שליסל; born 10 December 1975) is an Israeli convicted murderer. He stabbed marchers during the Jerusalem gay pride parade in 2005, for which he served ten years in prison. On 30 July 2015, during the 2015 Jerusalem gay pride, he stabbed 16-year-old Shira Banki to death and wounded five other people. The incident occurred just three weeks after his release from prison. On 24 August, Schlissel was indicted for murder, five counts of attempted murder, and wounding under aggravating circumstances, and detained until the end of proceedings. On 26 June 2016, he was sentenced to life plus 31 years in prison, as well as a fine of NIS 2,064,000 (around $650,000) in damages.

== Early life ==
Schlissel was born on 10 December 1975 in Yad Binyamin. He was the eldest of ten children. His grandparents were Holocaust survivors. After marrying he studied in a kollel in Jerusalem.

== Crimes and convictions ==
In 2005, Schlissel stabbed three marchers during the gay pride parade in Jerusalem. As a result, he was convicted of attempted murder and aggravated assault, and sentenced to twelve years in prison. In 2007, his sentence was reduced to ten years on appeal. Schlissel served his sentence at Maasiyahu Prison. In 2008, he was hospitalized for a month and a half over mental health issues and diagnosed with a paranoid psychiatric condition. Schlissel was released in June 2015.

Shortly after his release, he distributed a homophobic letter in his hometown which read, "It is the obligation of every Jew to keep his soul from punishment by stopping this giant desecration of God's name next Thursday." He was not tracked by the Israeli police in the West Bank because his previous crime had occurred in Jerusalem, outside of their jurisdiction. Moreover, Moshe Edry, the chief of the Jerusalem District Police, was not warned that Schlissel would be coming to Jerusalem.

On 30 July 2015, only three weeks after being released, he stabbed six marchers during the Jerusalem gay pride parade. The act was widely condemned, including by Prime Minister Benjamin Netanyahu. One of the victims, 16-year-old Shira Banki, died of her wounds at the Hadassah Medical Center three days later, on 2 August 2015. Shortly after, Netanyahu offered his condolences, adding "We will deal with the murderer to the fullest extent of the law."

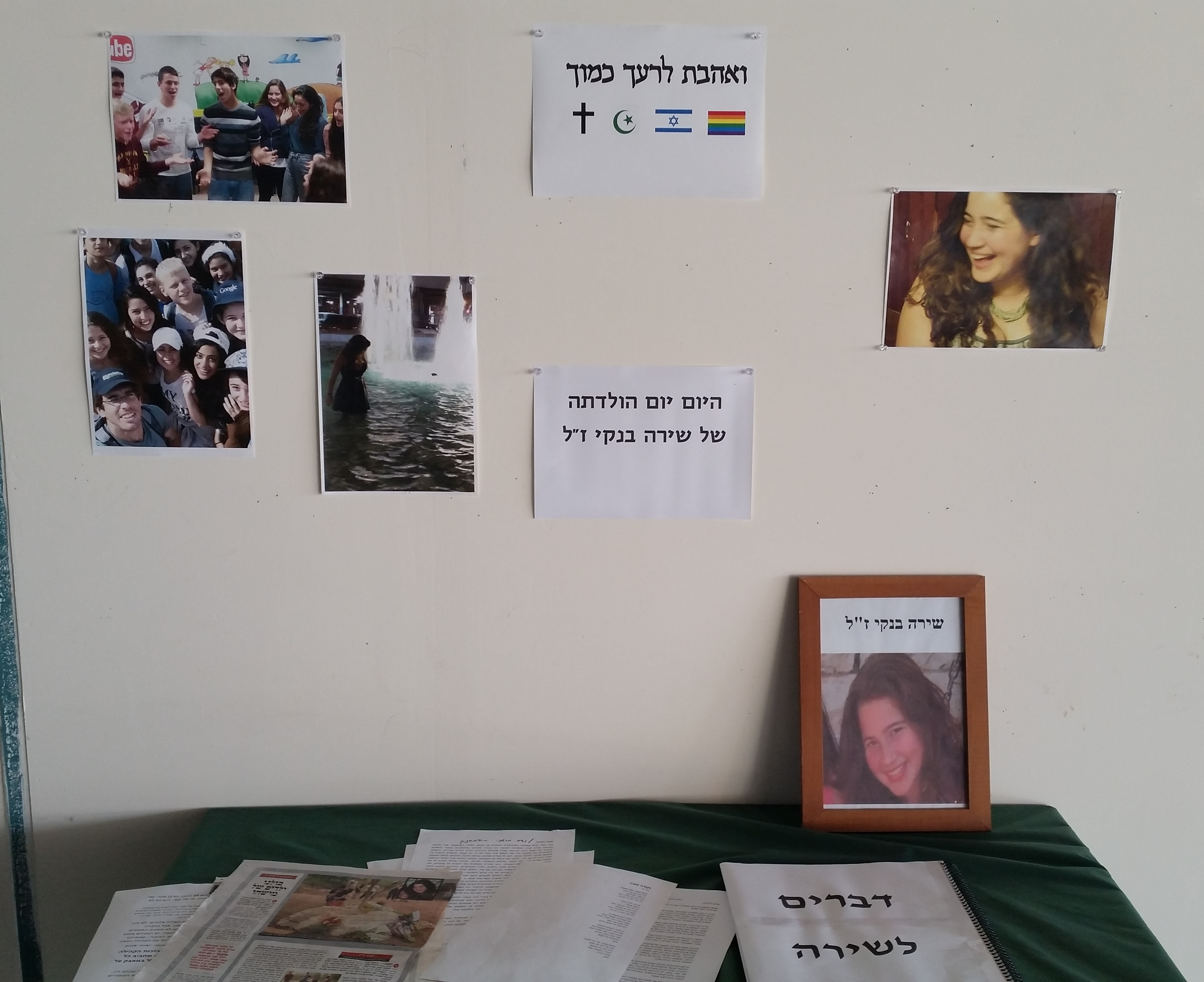
Banki's poetry memorial corner in her school

A psychiatric evaluation by the Israel Prison Service, with which Schlissel refused to cooperate, found him fit to stand trial. However, after state psychiatrists argued that his refusal to cooperate rendered the evaluation inconclusive, the court ordered that he be hospitalized for a 48-hour observation period for reevaluation. He was again found fit to stand trial. On 24 August 2015, Shlissel was charged with one count of murder and six counts of attempted murder and aggravated assault at the Jerusalem District Court. He refused to recognize the authority of the court to try him because it did not abide by Jewish religious law. He announced that he would refuse to be represented by an attorney, and did not cooperate with the public defender assigned to represent him. On 19 April 2016, he was convicted. On 26 June 2016, he was sentenced to life plus 31 years in prison, and was ordered to pay NIS 2,064,000 in compensation to the families of his victims.

Schlissel is serving his sentence in Ayalon Prison. In August 2016, Schlissel tore up pictures of another inmate's daughters due to them being "immodestly dressed", and was subsequently beaten by the inmate until guards separated them. Schlissel was hospitalized as a result of the beating he sustained, and was temporarily placed in solitary confinement as a disciplinary measure. After prison authorities carried out an evaluation, it was decided to separate him from other inmates due to his volatile behavior, and he was given his own cell in a protected area of the prison. One month later, Schlissel was again attacked and had to be hospitalized after an argument between him and two convicted mobsters in the prison yard escalated to the mobsters beating him until guards intervened.

== Personal life ==
Before his prison sentence, Schlissel resided in Modi'in Illit, a Haredi Israeli settlement in the West Bank. He is a Haredi Jew. Prior to his crime, he was married, with four children. He divorced his wife at the beginning of his imprisonment in 2005.
