= Eliyahu Brothers Postcards =

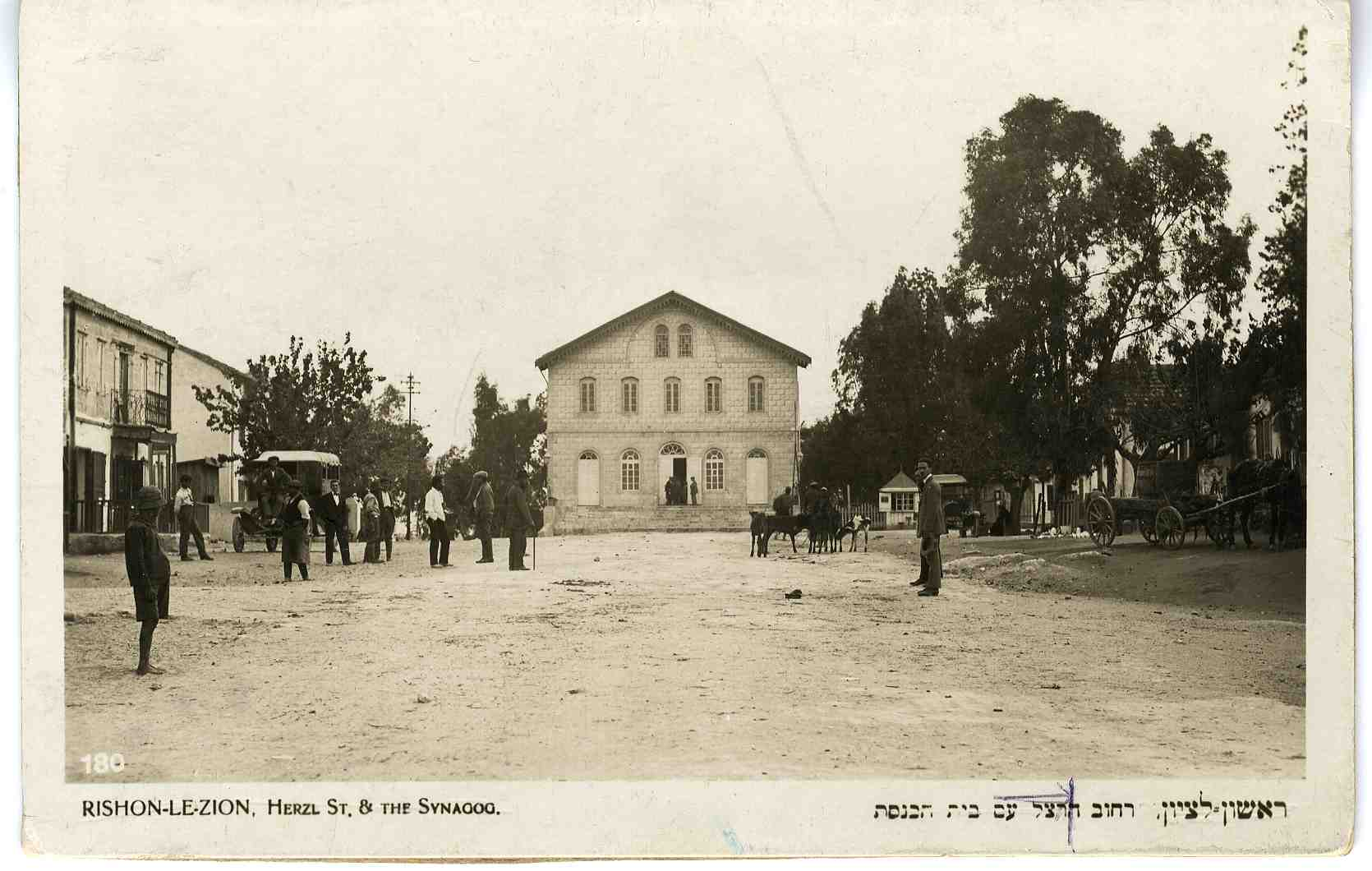
Synagogue at Richon Le Zion

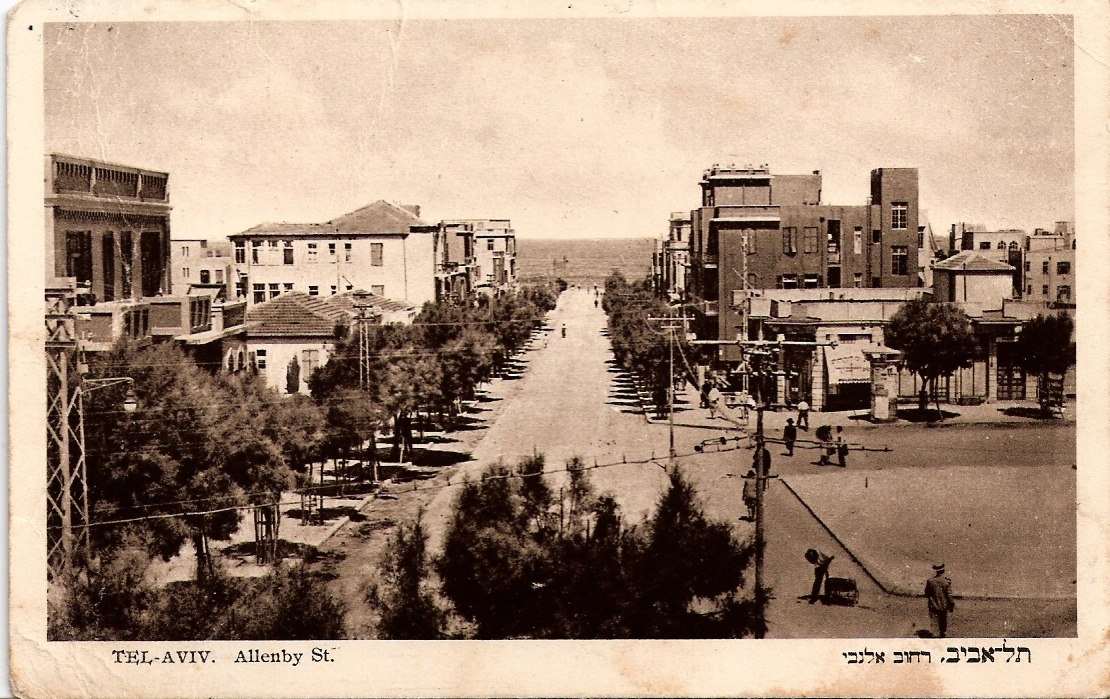
Allenby Street near the sea

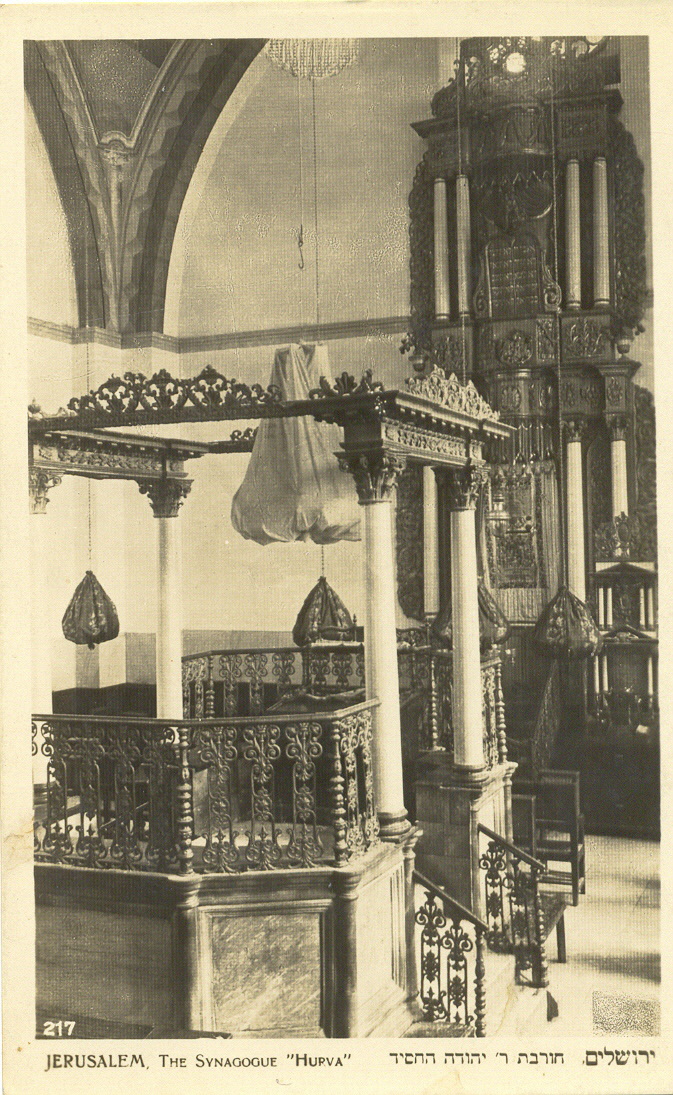
Hurva Synagogue at the old city of Jerusalem

Eliyahu Brothers Postcards are series of Postcards, who published by the Eliyahu brothers, Matityahu and Yossef Eliyahu, from the early 1920s to 1939 in Mandatory Palestine.

The Series includes hundreds of images; Most of the images are views of Israel and some others were the leaders of the Zionist movement.

== History ==
Matityahu and Yossef Eliyahu were born in Corfu to Malka and Abraham (Elia), active in the Zionist movement in Corfu. They arrived in 1914 to Ottoman Israel and worked in printing in Jaffa.

During World War I in 1917, they were deported from Tel Aviv with other citizens of the Enemy countries of the Ottoman Empire, especially Greece, of which they were born. They were persecuted and sent with hundreds of other Jewish refugees to Hama in Syria, and then to Istanbul.

After World War I, they returned to Mandatory Israel and set up a stationery store in Jaffa, and another on Nahalat Binyamin Street in Tel Aviv, later moving to Herzl Street.

Eliyahu brothers were importers of products from the Parker Pen Company, including ink, fountain pen types, and other accessories of stationery products. At the same time, they opened a publishing house printing postcards of Israel.

== Description ==
The postcards: colored and in black and white, were printed in Europe and sent from the printing houses to Mandatory Israel. The images of the postcards included: the Wailing Wall, Rachel's Tomb, new Zionist settlements — such as Petah Tikva, Hadera, and Degania Alef, Kibbutz Ein Harod and main cities such as Jerusalem and Haifa. Half of the images concerned Tel Aviv and streets such as Herzl, Nordau Boulevard, Sokolov, Ahad Ha'am, Bialik, Dizengoff, Rothschild Boulevard, and Trumpeldor. Others were about prominent leaders like Chaim Weizmann and Ze'ev Jabotinsky.

Dr. Dalia Levy, who researches their factory, wrote: "In the years 1939-1920, they were the largest producers of postcards in Mandatory Israel." (Note: דליה לוי, "תוציא את ז'. מהוויטרינה - ציווה האופיצר האנגלי", האומה, 178, קיץ תש"ע-2010, עמ' 82)

== Gallery ==
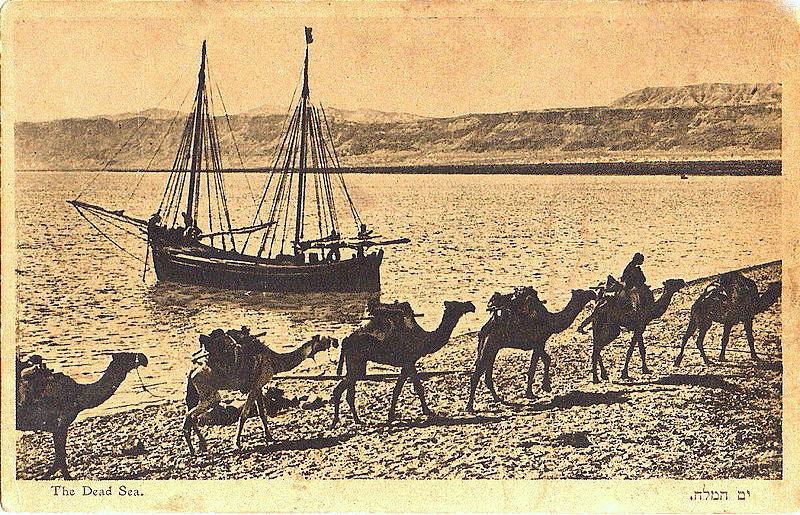
Camels and boat on the shore of the Dead Sea

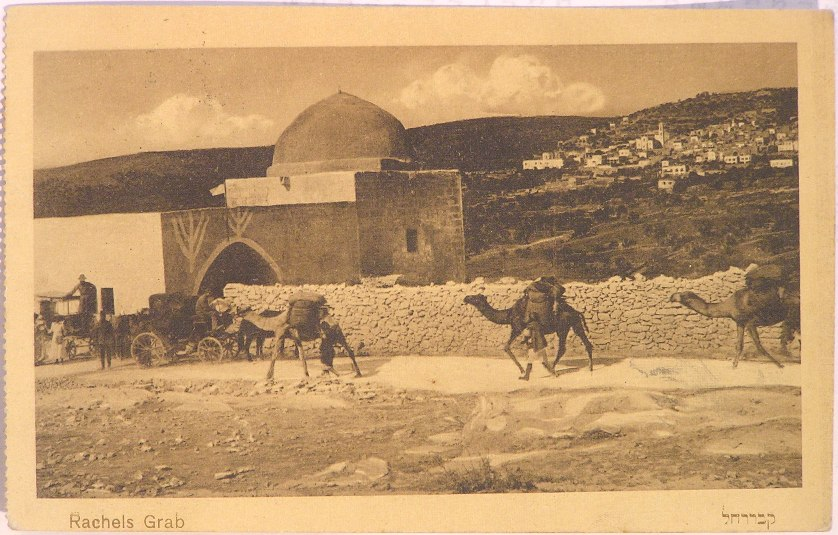
Rachel's Tomb at Bethlehem

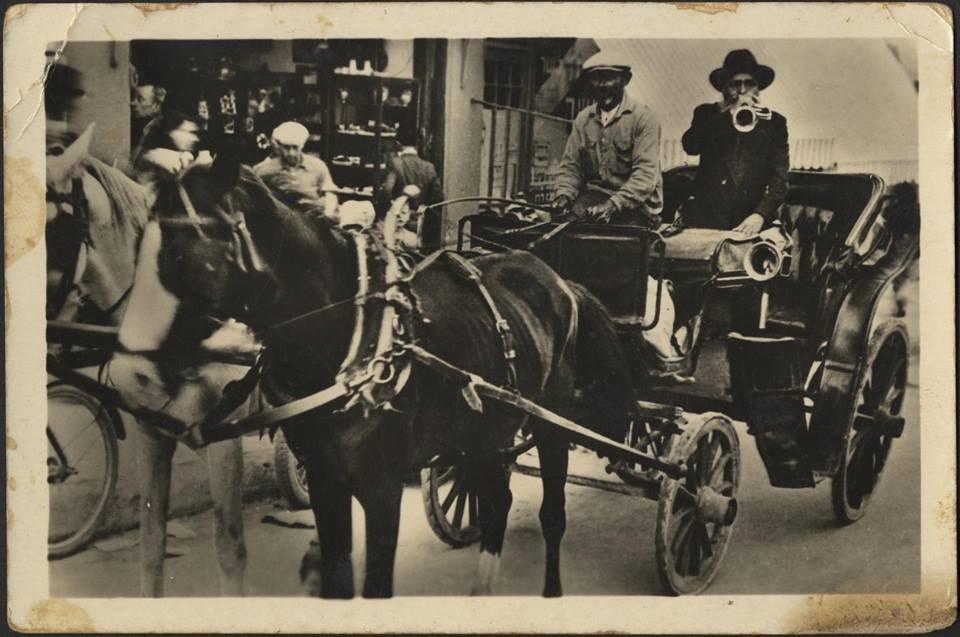
The announcement of the Sabbath in Tel Aviv
