= King George Street (Tel Aviv) =

Street in Tel Aviv, Israel

- רְחוֹב הַמֶּלֶךְ ג׳וֹרְג׳ Carmel Street
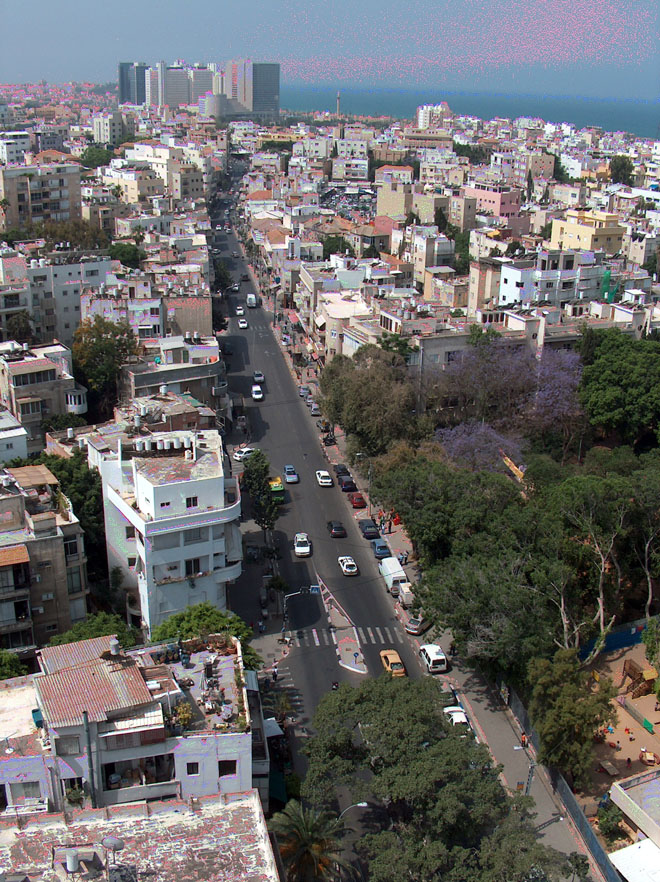
- King George Street, looking South
- Interactive map of King George Street
- Namesake: King George V
- Location: Tel Aviv
- Coordinates: 32°04′24″N 34°46′30″E

Construction
- Commissioned: 1920s

King George Street (Hebrew: רְחוֹב הַמֶּלֶךְ ג׳וֹרְג׳, romanized: Rehov ha-Melekh Jorj) is a street in Tel Aviv named after King George V of the United Kingdom who reigned during the British Mandate of Palestine. The street extends from Masaryk Square in the north to Magen David Square in the south, where it meets with Allenby Street, the Carmel Market, and Nahalat Binyamin Street.

== History ==
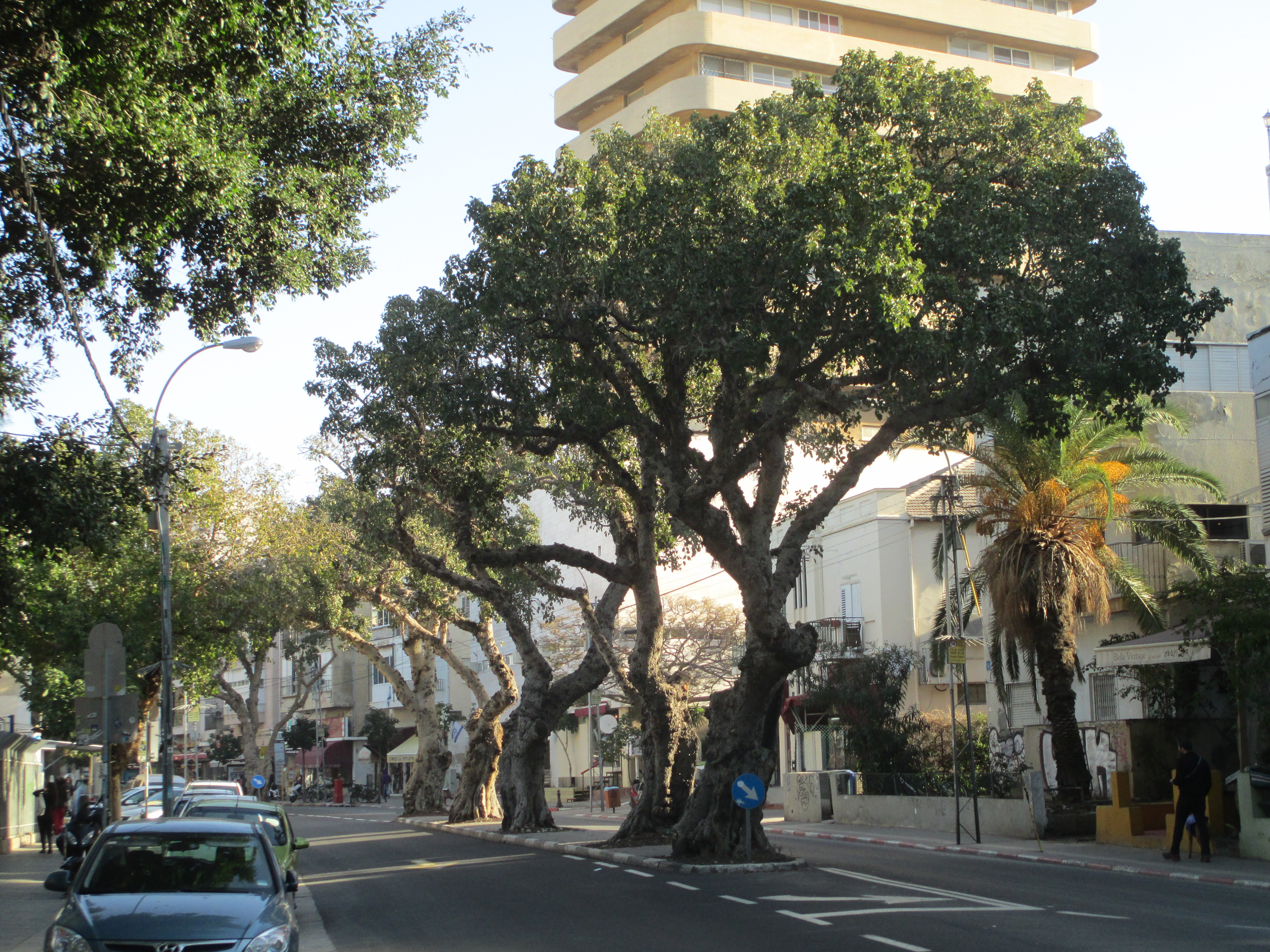
Sycamore trees lining King George Street

At the beginning of the 1920s, the street was called "Carmel Street." In 1935, it was changed to its current name to mark the occasion of the King's Silver Jubilee.

The western section of the street is still called "Carmel Street," due to its proximity to the Carmel Market.

Many of the buildings on King George Street are examples of the Bauhaus style, developed by German-Jewish architects who immigrated to Palestine in the 1930s.

== Landmarks ==
- Michael's Square
- Dizengoff Center
- Magen David Square
- Carmel Market
- Meir Garden
- Metzudat Ze'ev
