= Nahalat Binyamin =

Nahalat Binyamin נחלת בנימין
- Tel Aviv street & neighbourhood
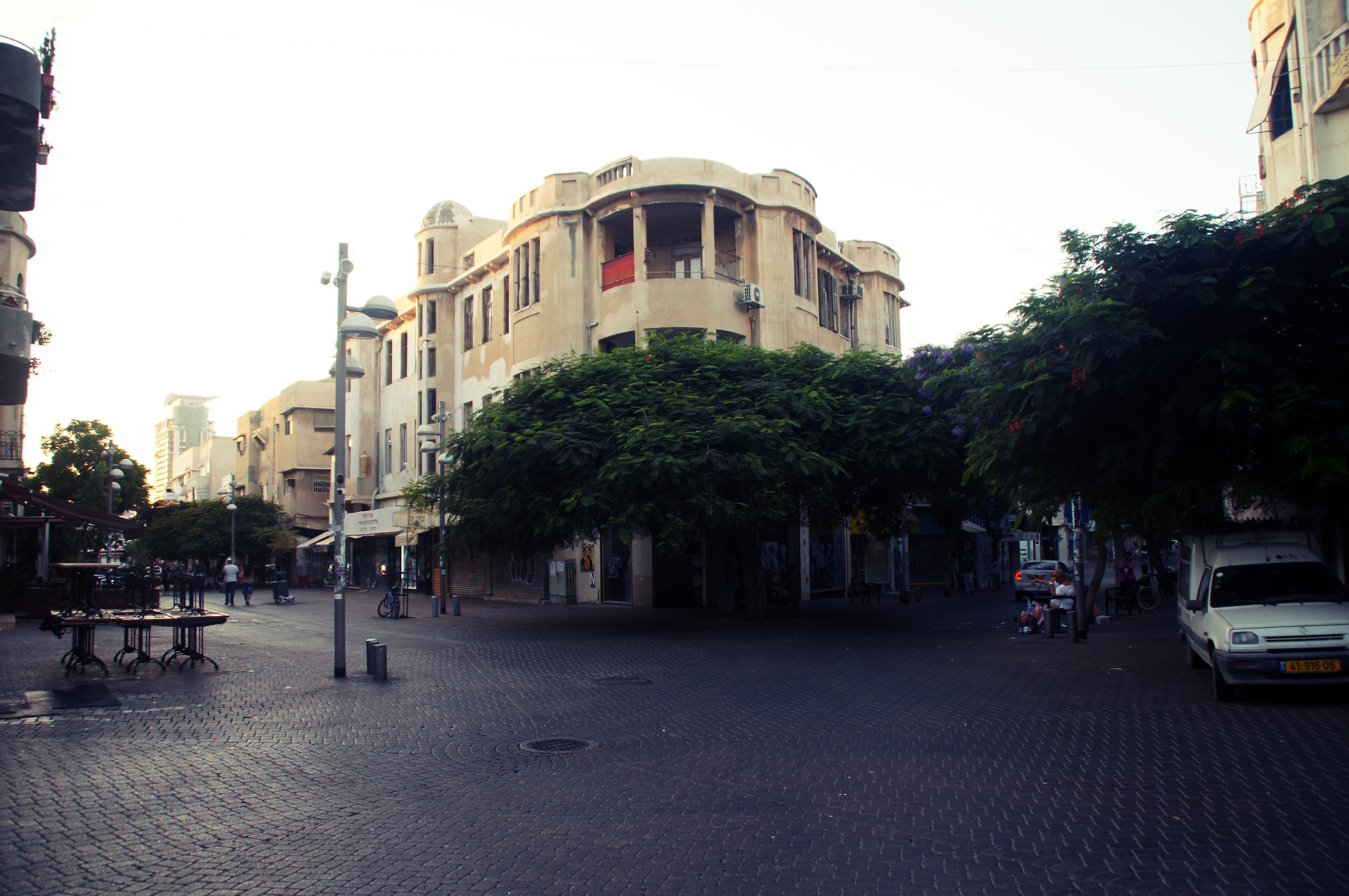
- The Urn House designed by architect Zeev Rechter, 1927
- Interactive map of Nahalat Binyamin
- Coordinates: 32°04′05″N 34°46′12″E
- Country: Israel
- Established: 1909

Nahalat Binyamin (Hebrew: נחלת בנימין נחלה, romanized: nakhalát binyamín), also spelled Nachalat, Nachlat, and Nahlat Binyamin) is a street and neighbourhood in Tel Aviv, Israel that is partially a pedestrian zone.

== Name ==
Nahalat Binyamin is translated as "the estate of Benjamin".

Nahala is a Hebrew word for either heritage or estate.

The second part of the name is the Hebrew form of the name Benjamin and has two potential origins: officially it refers to the Hebrew name of Theodor Herzl, the founder of modern political Zionism. However, local lore has it that the founders of Nahalat Binyamin asked for money from both the Jewish National Fund (JNF) organisation, closely linked to Herzl's activity, and from Edmond James de Rothschild, whose Hebrew name was also Benjamin, a man famous for being a major benefactor of Jewish settlement in Ottoman Palestine.

== Location ==
Nahalat Binyamin Street runs north to south. It begins in the north at Magen David Square, where it intersects with four other streets: Allenby, King George and its continuation HaCarmel, and Menahem Sheinkin. As of 2020, it has a car-free section down to Gruzenberg Street, and the municipality is planning to add to this the section between Kalischer Street and Rothschild Boulevard. Continuing southwards, Nahalat Binyamin crosses Jaffa and Florentin Streets, and ends ar Shalma Road.

The street's pedestrian section runs very close to the Carmel food market and Allenby Street, which is one of Tel Aviv's major arteries, and is close to the Kerem HaTeimanim quarter (lit. "Vineyard of the Yemenites"), an old, poorer neighborhood boasting a great number of good eateries, all of which helped Nahalat Binyamin becoming fully commercial, and since 1987 adds to its attractiveness as an arts-and-crafts fair.

== History ==
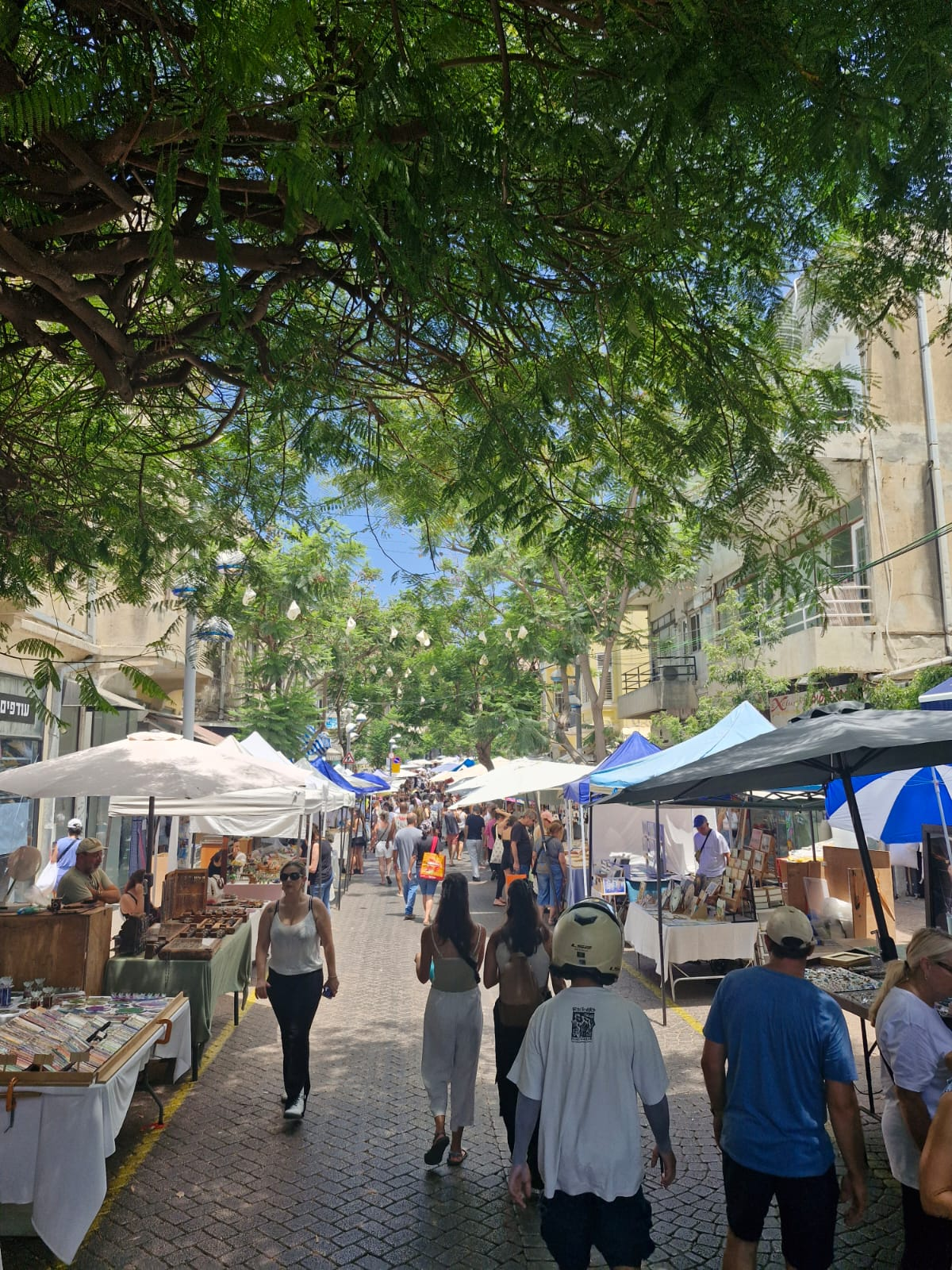
Artisan market in Nahalat Binyamin

Ahuzat Bayit, the homebuilding association of wealthy Jewish families which started off the city of Tel Aviv, started building in 1909. The purpose was escaping the crowded and unsanitary Old City of Jaffa. At about the same time, the Nahalat Binyamin Association, consisting mainly of tradesmen and clerks, craftsmen, shopkeepers, booksellers, a baker and a laundress, had trouble financing their own, similar project. The Jewish National Fund, which had helped out Ahuzat Bayit, was not forthcoming, as was the bank they approached. In 1911, a journalist and Zionist activist known as Rabbi Binyamin (actual name: Yehoshua Redler Feldman), a pioneer of the Second Aliyah (see #External links), wrote an angry article accusing the two institutions of favouring the well-off. Soon after its publication, the association acquired a long strip of land among the sand dunes running parallel to the coast. The 20 dunams (five acres) the association had purchased were divided into 35 plots. They started building right away, at first modest Arab-style homes with two rooms and a kitchen. The first houses of both Nahalat Binyamin and Achuzat Bayit were one-storey buildings with residential purpose, with Jaffa still being the main hub for work and business. Most houses were built of local kurkar, by Arab workmen from Jaffa, without an architect's plan and just following their experience. That same year, 1911, the association also signed an agreement with the renamed Ahuzat Bayit, by then already called Tel Aviv, partly joining it and agreeing to connect its streets to Tel Aviv's and to participate in the infrastructure costs, in exchange for being connected to Tel Aviv's water supply system and other services. The next year, with 23 houses already standing, Nahalat Binyamin became an integral part of Tel Aviv. The neighborhood consisted of Nahalat Binyamin Street itself, which ran parallel to Herzl Street, Tel Aviv's main axis, as well as Kalisher Street.

In its early years, Nahalat Binyamin Street was the longest road in Tel Aviv. Along with its residential role, right from the beginning it housed small shops, with many of its first inhabitants being metal craftsmen, as well as booksellers and various shopkeepers.

In the 1920s, a decade of repeated anti-Jewish Arab riots in Jaffa, many Jews left that city and moved to a constantly growing Tel Aviv. At this time Nahalat Binyamin Street became Tel Aviv's main commercial thoroughfare. The houses underwent a process of transformation, additional storeys being added and the shops occupying the bottom floor. The residential buildings of the neighbourhood had been initially planned to be surrounded by gardens, and were built on raised platforms or podiums lining the pavements. Also in the 1920s, the dirt road called Nahalat Binyamin was paved, the workers being mostly women.

The location and length of Nahalat Binyamin made it into a preferred spot for city ceremonies and events, eventually becoming fully commercial.

Before being transformed into a pedestrian mall in 1987, Nahalat Binyamin was one of Tel Aviv's noisiest streets, with some 60,000 vehicles passing through daily. The city decided to close off Nahalat Binyamin and two adjacent streets to vehicles, at the same time establishing the arts-and-crafts fair, the first of its kind in Israel. What began with several dozen stands, by 2011 had reached over 200.

== Architecture ==
Nahalat Binyamin Street has a variety of simple old houses, eclectic buildings dominant until the 1920s with a mix of Eastern and Western elements, flashes of Art Deco elements, and modernistic International Style houses from the 1930s, the latter style locally better known as Bauhaus.

=== Notable buildings ===
- Polishuk House (Beit Polishuk), at the corner with Allenby Street, 1934, architects Shlomo Liaskovsky and Jacob (Yaakov) Orenstein, which, after being restored by Israeli architect Nitza Metzger-Szmuk and with a new interior design by Karim Rashid, now houses the Poli House Hotel.
- Palm Tree House (Beit HaDekel) at 8, Nahalat Binyamin. Built in 1922 after plans by architect Yehoshua Zvi Tabachnik (Tavori), it is among the most extravagant houses on the street, with Oriental and specifically Jewish Art Nouveau design elements, such as the name-giving palm tree on the facade, altar horns, Temple menorahs, and two Stars of David.
- Leitz-Soroka House, 1921, architect Y. Z. Tabachnik, at 10, Nahalat Binyamin. First built as a one-storey house, it was raised by one floor in 1925 and covered by a tiled roof. Despite having two different owners and spreading across two lots, the house was built and functioned as a single building with a shared stairwell. The impressive Eclectic-Style façade was damaged by changes made from 1926 onwards, when the ground floor was adapted for commercial purposes, as it happened along the entire street. Large show-windows were opened into the main façade, badly affecting their beautiful original design. As of 2020, the building is being restored and expanded, as part of the gentrification process in the area.
- Shmuel Levy House, 1926. Eclectic style, known for its ceramic tiles with biblical themes produced by a Bezalel Academy of Arts and Design graduate.
- Urn House, 1927, designed by architect Zeev Rechter, at 16, Nachlat Binyamin/Rambam Square. The name is derived from the urns or amphorae decorating its corners.
- Pillars House (Beit HaAmudim; also Zalman Noah House), 1925 or 1927, designed in the Eclectic Style by architect Yehuda Magidovitch, from 16, Rambam Street to HaTavor (Tabor) Street. Named for its Italian Renaissance-influenced pillars and arches. A large building covering an area of ca. two dunams.
- Spector Hotel, 1914, at 18, Nahalat Binyamin, established by hotelier Elkana Spector. It was used as an infirmary for Jewish victims of the 1921 Jaffa riots, afterwards becoming Tel Aviv's main Hadassah Hospital building, until a new one was built on Balfour Street. Rami Meiri, a Tel Aviv graffiti artist, has painted the facade at the corner between Binyamin and Mohilever Street.
- Nordau Hotel, 1927, Eclectic Style, by Yehuda Magidovitch, on the corner of Nahalat Binyamin–Gruzenberg Street. As of 2015, Tel Aviv's oldest hotel in continuous use.
- 46-48, Nahalat Binyamin - 17, Ahad Ha'am Street. The new Isrotel boutique hotel connects two buildings, both marked for preservation, into one. The building at 46, Nahalat Binyamin Street, uniquely shows the historical development typical for the neighbourhood and the city as a whole. Built in 1913 after the sketches of the owner as a one-storey residence, it was made of kurkar stones with a tiled roof. The owner was Yaakov Matmon, the brother of Yehuda Leib Matmon-Cohen, one of the founders of Ahuzat Bayit. Later, the ground floor was transformed into a shop, which required it to be lowered, as it had been built up on a podium alongside the pavement. The facade was adapted accordingly. The tiled gable roof was replaced by a flat roof. The second building, at 48, Nahalat Binyamin Street, was built in 1911 as the home of Rabbi Binyamin (Yehoshua Redler Feldman).

== Other attractions ==
Tuesdays and Fridays, the Nahalat Binyamin Arts & Crafts Fair, the country's largest, attracts with the work of more than 200 artists selected by a public committee.

Nahalat Binyamin and Florentin are the Tel Aviv neighborhoods with unique murals in the graffiti art scene.

The neighborhood offers easy access to the Carmel food market, to the Kerem HaTeimanim neighbourhood with its simple grilled-meat eateries and established restaurants, and on to Neve Tzedek, a tourist magnet on the way to Jaffa.
