= Zeev Rechter =

Pioneering Israeli architect (1899-1960)

Ze'ev Rechter
- זאב רכטר
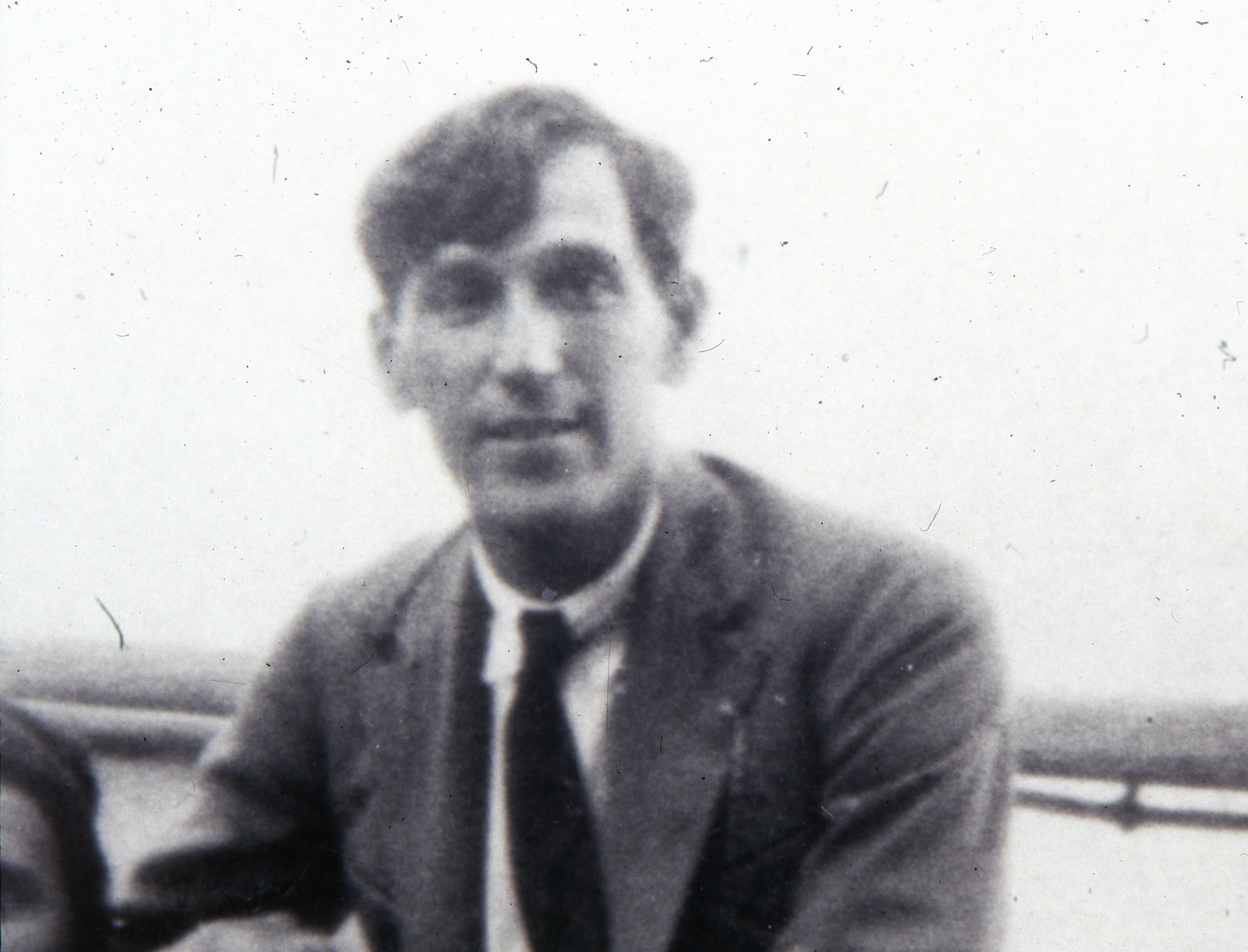
- Born: 1899; Russian Empire
- Died: 1960 (aged 60–61)
- Occupation: Architect
- Spouse: Paula Singer
- Children: 3
- Buildings: International Convention Center, Mann Auditorium

Ze'ev Rechter (Hebrew: זאב רכטר; 1899–1960) was a pioneering architect of Mandatory Palestine and later Israel, who designed many of Israel's iconic buildings. He migrated to Palestine from the Russian Empire. He is considered one of the three founding fathers of Israeli architecture, along with Dov Karmi and Arieh Sharon. Among his works, Rechter designed Binyanei HaUma (International Convention Center in Jerusalem), the Tel Aviv courthouse and the Mann Auditorium (together with Karmi). He introduced the use of stilt columns known as piloti in residential housing in Israel.

== Biography ==
Rechter was born in the Russian Empire. He immigrated to Mandate Palestine at the age of 20, arriving on board the Ruslan along with fellow architect Yehuda Megidovich, artist Yitzhak Frenkel and historian Joseph Klausner. His first job was measuring the land that became Allenby Street. In 1924, he designed Beit Hakadim (the "Urn House"), on the corner of Nahalat Binyamin and Rambam streets, named for the large vases on its cornices. In 1926 he went to Rome to study architecture, but a shortage of money forced him and his family to return to Palestine. In 1927 he designed a residence for the poet Esther Raab on HaGalil Street (today Mapu street) in a fledgling modernist style inspired by his impressions from Italy. The house was later demolished. In 1929 he went to the École des Ponts et Chaussées in Paris to further his studies. It was then that he became an enthusiastic disciple of Le Corbusier. Upon his return, he settled in Tel Aviv and founded the Hug group of architects together with Arieh Sharon and Josef Neufeld, who had also returned from studies and work in Europe. In 1951, he drafted the project for the Israeli pavilion at the Venice Biennale.

Rechter died in 1960. The Beersheeba Municipal Conservatory was built many years later, in 1975, following designs by Rechter and Moshe Zarhy.

=== Family ===
Rechter was married to Paula Singer, with whom he had three children: Yaakov, who also became an architect, and two daughters, Aviva and Tuti.

== Gallery ==
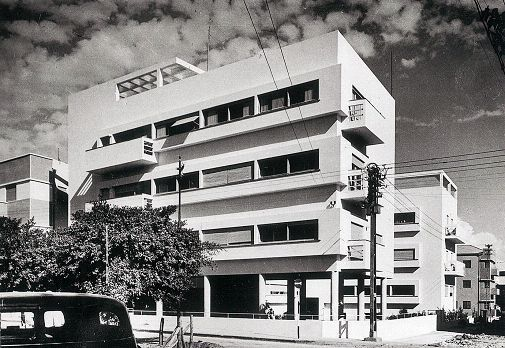
Engel House, Tel Aviv (1934)

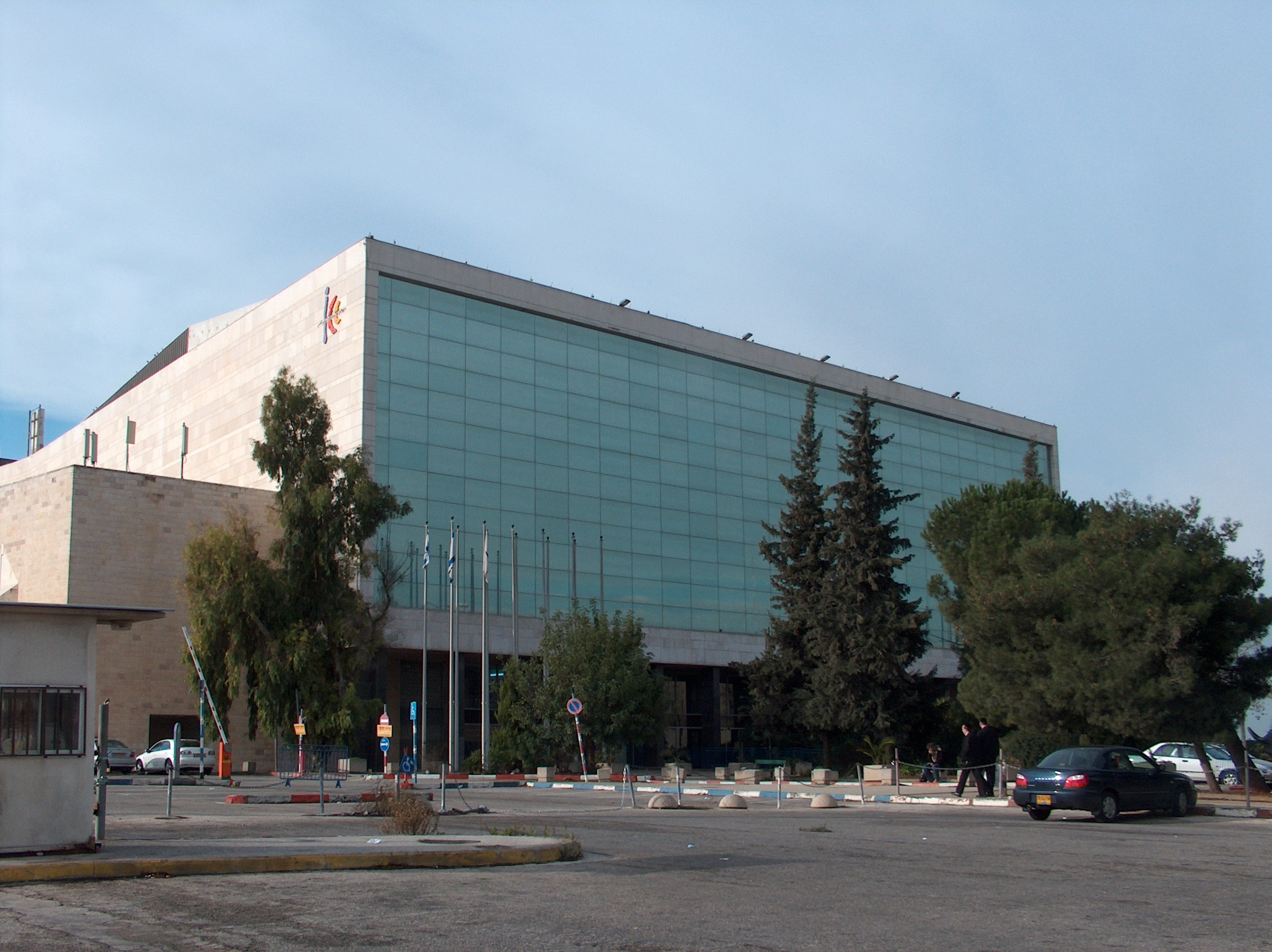
Binianey HaUma, Jerusalem (1950)

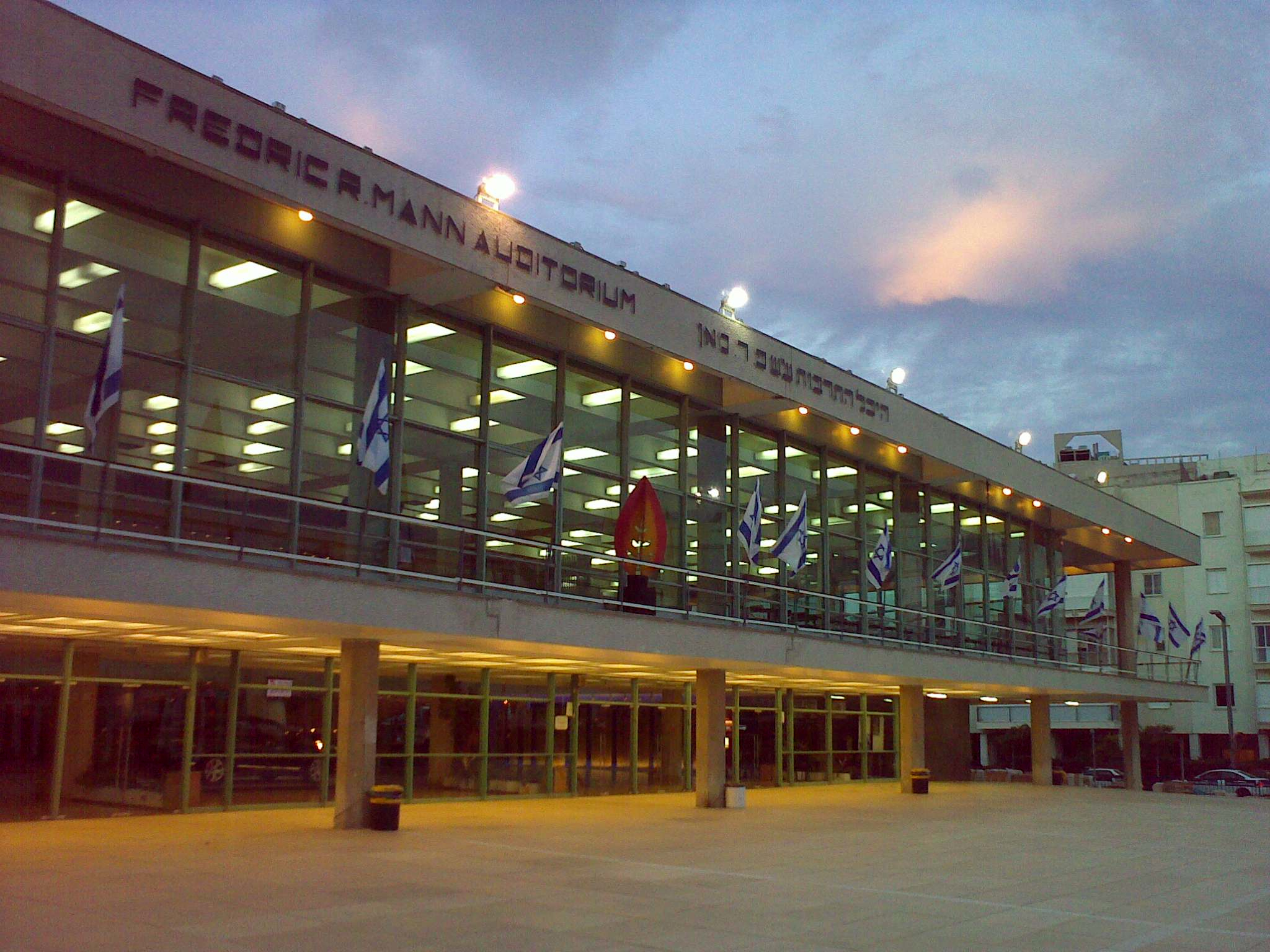
Mann Auditorium (1951)

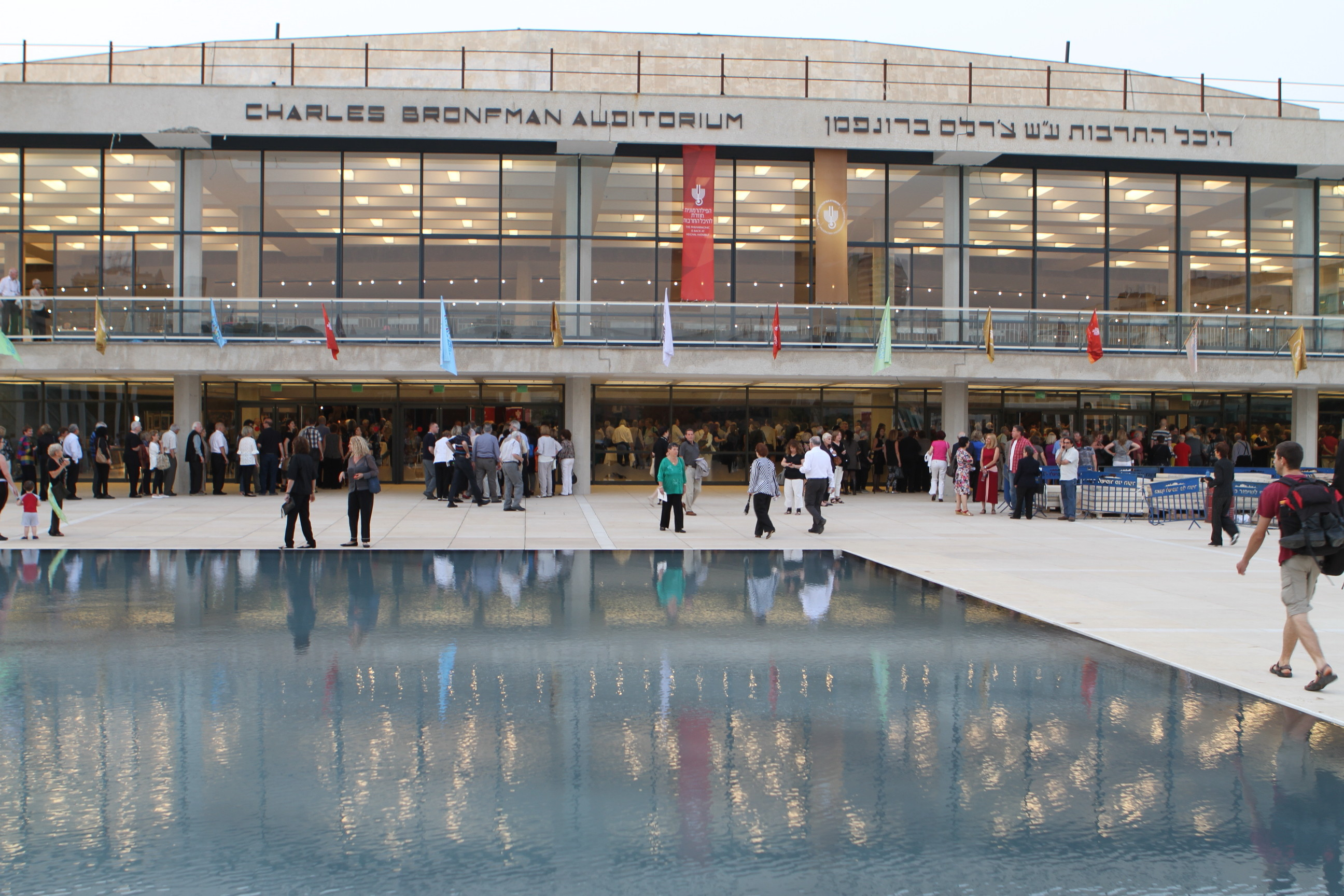
Mann Auditorium, Tel Aviv, Zeev Rechter and Dov Karmi, 1951

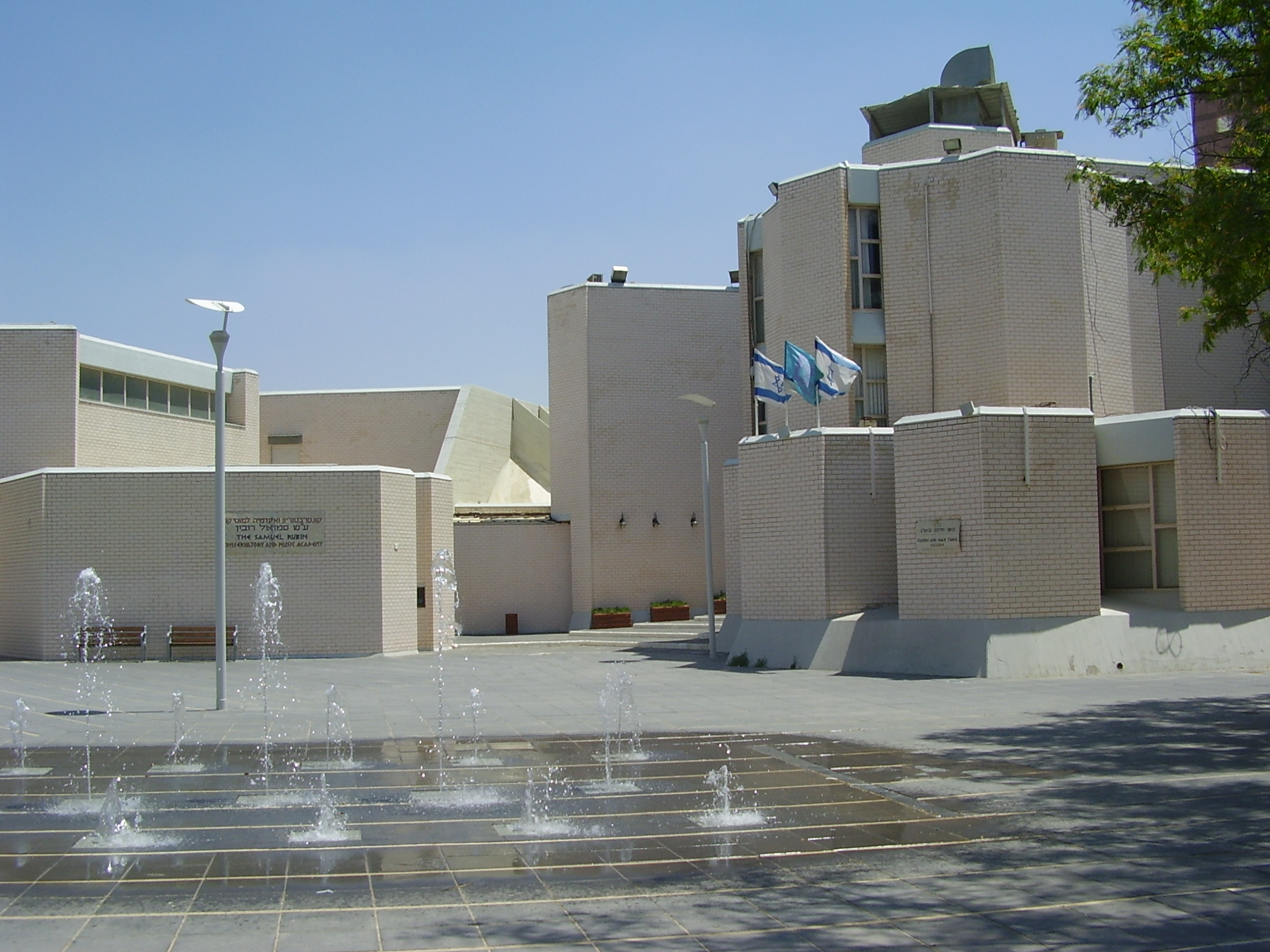
Beersheeba Municipal Conservatory (1975)
