= Nhlanhla =

Nhlanhla is a given name. Notable people with the name include:

- Nhlanhla Dlamini (born 1986), South African basketball player with Vaal University of South Africa's Premier Basketball League
- Nhlanhla Gcwabaza, South African politician
- Nhlanhla Khuzwayo (born 1990), South African international footballer
- Nhlanhla Nene (born 1958), the Minister of Finance of South Africa, appointed on 25 May 2014
- Joe Nhlanhla (1936–2008), African National Congress national executive and the former South African Intelligence Minister
- Nhlanhla Shabalala (born 1985), South African football (soccer) midfielder for Premier Soccer League club AmaZulu
- Nhlanhla Vilakazi (born 1987), South African professional footballer

== See also ==
- Nahla (disambiguation)
