= Basem Khandakji =

Palestinian poet & writer (born 1983)

- باسم خندقجي
- Born: 1983 (age 42–43); Palestine
- Education: Journalism
- Alma mater: An-Najah National University
- Occupations: writer and novelist
- Organization: Popular Front for the Liberation of Palestine (PFLP)
- Known for: Carmel Market Bombing

Basem Khandakji (Arabic: باسم خندقجي, romanized: Bāsim khndqjy; born 1983) is a Palestinian writer who was born in 1983. When he was 20, he was convicted in his role in helping to kill three people. His novel, written while in prison, A Mask, the Color of the Sky won the Arabic Booker Prize in 2024.

He has studied at An-Najah National University and Al-Quds University. He was arrested by the Israeli Defense Forces on November 2, 2004, and was sentenced to life imprisonment for his involvement in the Carmel Market bombing, in which three people were murdered. He has published several novels, poems, and studies from prison. Khandakhji was released from Israeli prison in 2025 as part of the deal to exchange Palestinian prisoners for hostages being held by Hamas.

== Personal life ==
Basem Muhammad Salih Adeeb Khandakji was born on December 22, 1983. He studied in Nablus Governorate Schools. Later, he joined An-Najah National University to study in the Department of Journalism and Media. He witnessed the First Intifada which affected and subsequently he joined the ranks of the former Communist Palestinian People's Party when he was 15 years old.

== Involvement in the Carmel Market Bombing ==
On 1 November of 2004 Khandakji used his journalist ID card to get through IDF checkpoints in the West Bank in order to drive sixteen year old Amar al-Far to Tel Aviv. Later that day, al-Far detonated a bomb in Carmel Market, killing himself along with Shmuel Levy, Leah Levin, and Tatiana Ackerman also injuring 32 others. The PFLP took credit for the attack. In 2025, he said that he did not express any regret for his actions, though if he could turn back the clock, he would not have resorted to violence.

== Arrest and Imprisonment ==
Khandakji was arrested on November 2, 2004, by Israeli forces, on accusations of involvement in the bombing. Khandakji was sentenced on June 7, 2005, to three life sentences. In addition to this, the Israeli authorities demanded that he compensate the families of those who were killed in the operation with an amount of $11.6 million.

In prison, he enrolled in Al-Quds University, studying political science and writing a thesis on Israeli studies. He was released from prison in 2025 as part of the prisoner swap between the Hamas and the Israeli government.

== Career ==
Khandakji began writing short stories before his imprisonment.

He continued his journey of writing inside the prison and he published several books, novels, and poetry collections. His first book was Drafts of the Homeland Lover, ten articles about Palestinian concerns. He also published Thus Humanity Is Dying, also about Palestinian concerns. Khandakji also published a poetry collection, (A know on the Walls of the Place). His novel The Eclipse Badreddine was published in December 2018 and is a historical novel that talks about the Sufi hero Badreddine, a scholar and a pillar of Sufism in his time. On 2025 in an interview he confirmed writing a new book about a fellow prisoner, the PLF leader Walid Daqqa, who served lifetime punishment for murdering Israeli Soldier. In the same interview Khandakji confirmed he was involved in sending a suicide bomber to kill Israelis. He noted that he intended to send them to attack military targets, not civilians, adding that if he could turn back the clock, he would not have resorted to violence.

== Works ==
- Rituals of the First Time (Tuqus Al Mara Al Ula), poetry, 2010
- The Breath of a Nocturnal Poem (Anfas Qasia Lailya), poetry, 2013
- The Narcissus of Isolation, poetry, 2017
- The Eclipse of Badr al-Din (Khosuf Badreddine), novel, 2019
- The Breath of a Woman Let Down, novel, 2020
- A Mask, the Color of the Sky, novel, 2024 (winner of International Prize for Arabic Fiction)
