= Magen David Square =

Square in Tel Aviv, Israel

Coordinates: 32°4′11.42″N 34°46′13.78″E

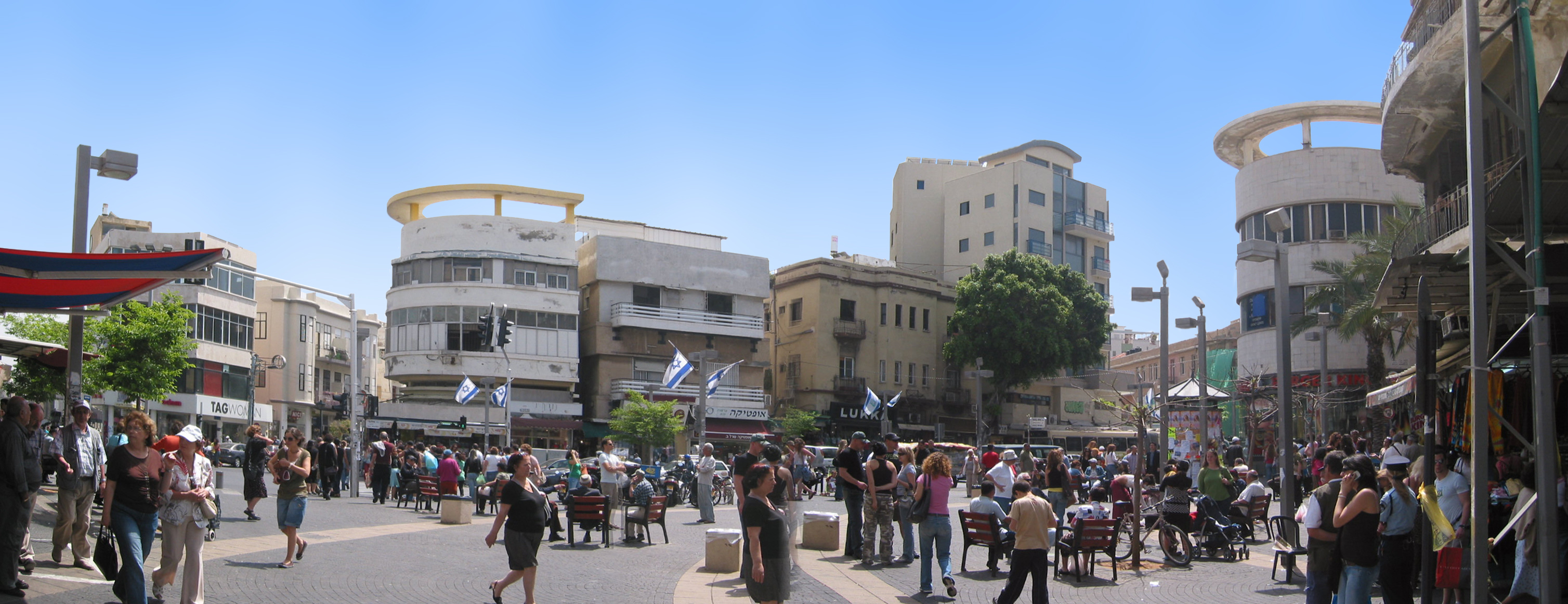
Magen David Square

Magen David Square (Hebrew: כיכר מגן-דוד, romanized: Kikar Magen-David, lit. 'Shield of David Square') is a public square in the heart of Tel Aviv, Israel. Named because streets radiate from it in six directions: Allenby Street (in two directions), King George, Menahem Sheinkin, HaCarmel (with the Carmel Market), and Nahalat Binyamin. The square is one of the busiest in the city center.
