= Carmel Market =

Outdoor marketplace in Tel Aviv, Israel

Coordinates: 32°4′7.26″N 34°46′8.57″E

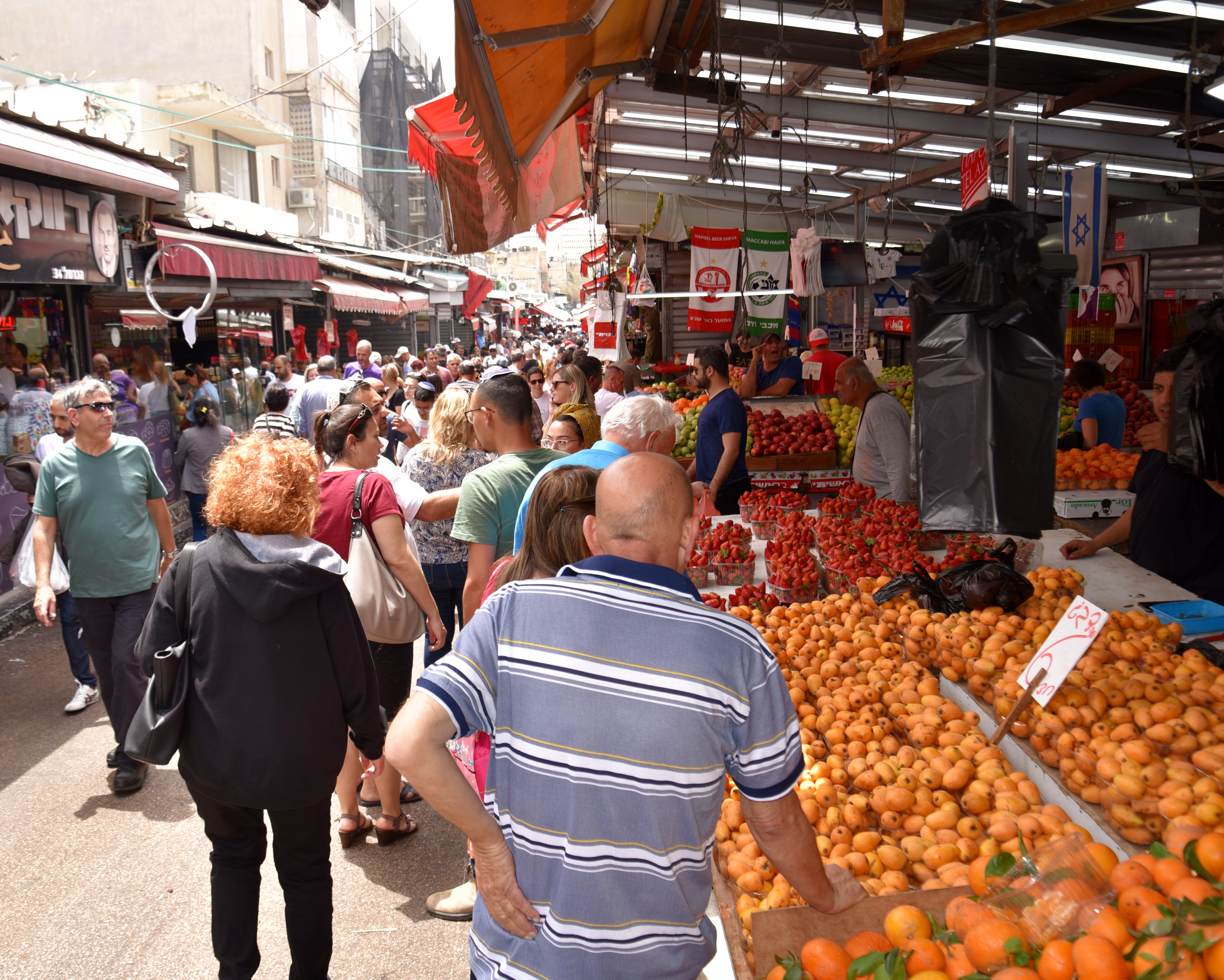
- Location: Carmel Street; Tel Aviv, Israel
- Opening date: 1920s
- Environment: Outdoor
- Goods sold: Food, home accessories, flowers, crafts, art, jewelry
- Days normally open: Sunday to Friday
- Interactive map of Carmel Market

Carmel Market (Hebrew: שוק הכרמל, Shuk HaCarmel) is an outdoor marketplace in Tel Aviv, Israel.

== History ==
The Carmel market was established in the 1920s. It is bordered by Allenby Street and Magen David Square and is principally located along Carmel Street, but has expanded over time to streets, such as Nahalat Binyamin Street.

The market is open every day of the week, except Shabbat (Saturday), and sells mostly food but also a variety of items, such as home accessories, clothing, and flowers. Tuesdays and Fridays are the signature days at the market as several independent artists and vendors sell unique crafts, art, and jewelry along the Nahalat Binyamin Street.

It is the largest shuk, or marketplace in Tel Aviv.

== See also ==
- Mahane Yehuda Market
- Carmel Market bombing
