= A Mask, the Colour of the Sky =

2023 book by Basem Khandakji

A Mask, the Colour of the Sky قناع بلون السماء
- Author: Basem Khandakji
- Language: Arabic
- Publication date: 2023
- Publication place: Palestine

A Mask, the Colour of the Sky (قناع بلون السماء) is a novel by the Palestinian writer, poet, and prisoner Basem Khandakji, published in 2023 by Dar Al-Adab in Beirut. The novel won the International Prize for Arabic Fiction in 2024, called the Arabic Booker Prize.

The novel was translated into English by Addie Leak; the English edition was published in 2026 by Europa Editions.

== Background ==
The book was written during confinement in Israeli prison. Israeli prison authorities denied all knowledge of the book.

Khandakji's brother said the novel was written between June and November 2021 "in difficult circumstances".

The author chose Mary Magdalene as a focal point of the novel, saying, "Mary Magdalene was subjected to historical oppression and transformed into a passive, sexual object. She was excluded from the Gospel context and relegated to a silenced history. I attempted to resurrect her from this history, to rewrite her, and to introduce a symbolic dimension: Mary Magdalene is an expression of the Palestinian condition and of Palestine’s position in history."

The author was released from Israeli prison in October 2025, following a prisoner exchange between Hamas and Israel. However, he was exiled from his hometown, Nablus, sent into Egypt.

== Synopsis ==
The book centres on a Palestinian named Nur who lives in a refugee camp in Ramallah. Finding the blue identity card given to Israelis in a secondhand coat, he assumes a fake name, Ur, and is hired for an archaeological dig near Megiddo.

== Reactions ==
The novel won the International Prize for Arabic Fiction in 2024 in a unanimous decision. The prize is widely considered the Arab world's most prestigious.

In a statement, the judges announced:

A Mask, the Colour of the Sky fuses the personal with the political in innovative ways. It ventures into experimenting with new narrative forms to explore three types of consciousness: that of the self, the Other, and the world. It dissects a complex, bitter reality of family fragmentation, displacement, genocide, and racism. The strands of history, myth, and the present day are delicately woven together in a narrative that pulses with compassion in the face of dehumanisation, and is stirred by a desire for freedom from oppression, both at an individual and societal level.

— Nabil Suleiman, chair of the 2024 panel of judges

On the night the book won the award, the author was beaten by Israeli guards in his cell, then placed in solitary confinement in Ofer Prison. He discovered he had won during the interrogation.

The Asian Review of Books called the book "an absorbing and challenging read, which will leave the reader with much to think about". Publishers Weekly said that while plot meandered, "The novel develops into an intriguing discourse on the nature of identity, especially with the narrator’s insights into Mary Magdalene’s metamorphosis in the presence of Jesus and the ways in which she symbolizes human contradictions."
