= Tel Aviv LGBTQ Center =

LGBTQ community center in Tel Aviv, Israel

- המרכז העירוני לקהילה הגאה
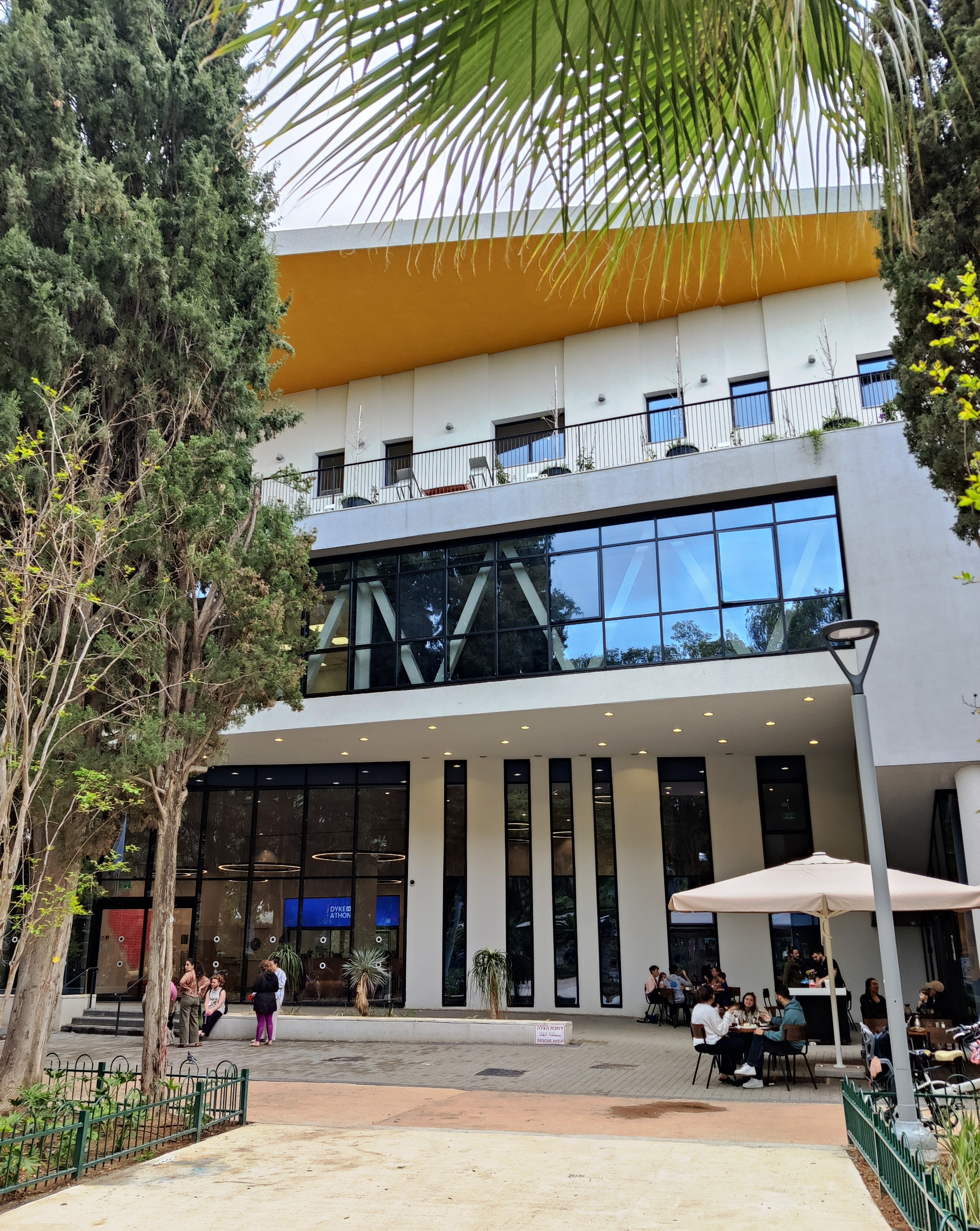
- Formation: 2008; 18 years ago
- Headquarters: Tchernikhovski Street 22, Tel Aviv-Yafo, Israel
- Coordinates: 32.072898919551314°N 34.77208190447801°E
- Website: lgbtqcenter.org.il

The Tel Aviv LGBTQ Center (Hebrew: המרכז העירוני לקהילה הגאה, HaMerkaz HaIroni LaKehila HaGe'a) is a community center and umbrella organization for the LGBTQ community in Tel Aviv, Israel. The center contains a clinic specializing in LGBTQ healthcare as well as programs for all ages and identities, including social groups, treatment groups, drag shows, and art exhibitions. It is located in a restored Bauhaus building in Meir Park at the city center.

== Building ==
The center opened in 2008 and is located at 22 Tchernikhovski Street.

The building currently housing the LGBT Center is at the southern end of Meir Park at the city center, off King George Street. Built in 1920, it was used first as a school and later as a branch of the Noar HaOved youth movement.

With no surrounding wall or fence, the building opens directly onto the park. The ground floor and terrace include a popular cafe, as well as an auditorium, reception desk and unisex bathrooms. The three upper floors include a meeting room and several rooms used for community activities, including an indoor playground for toddlers, rehearsal room for theater groups, the offices of several LGBT organizations and a health care clinic of the Clalit HMO, focusing on LGBT needs but open to the general public.

The garden surrounding the building includes a memorial to the victims of the 2009 Tel Aviv gay centre shooting, and a memorial to LGBT victims of Nazi persecution.

== Activities ==
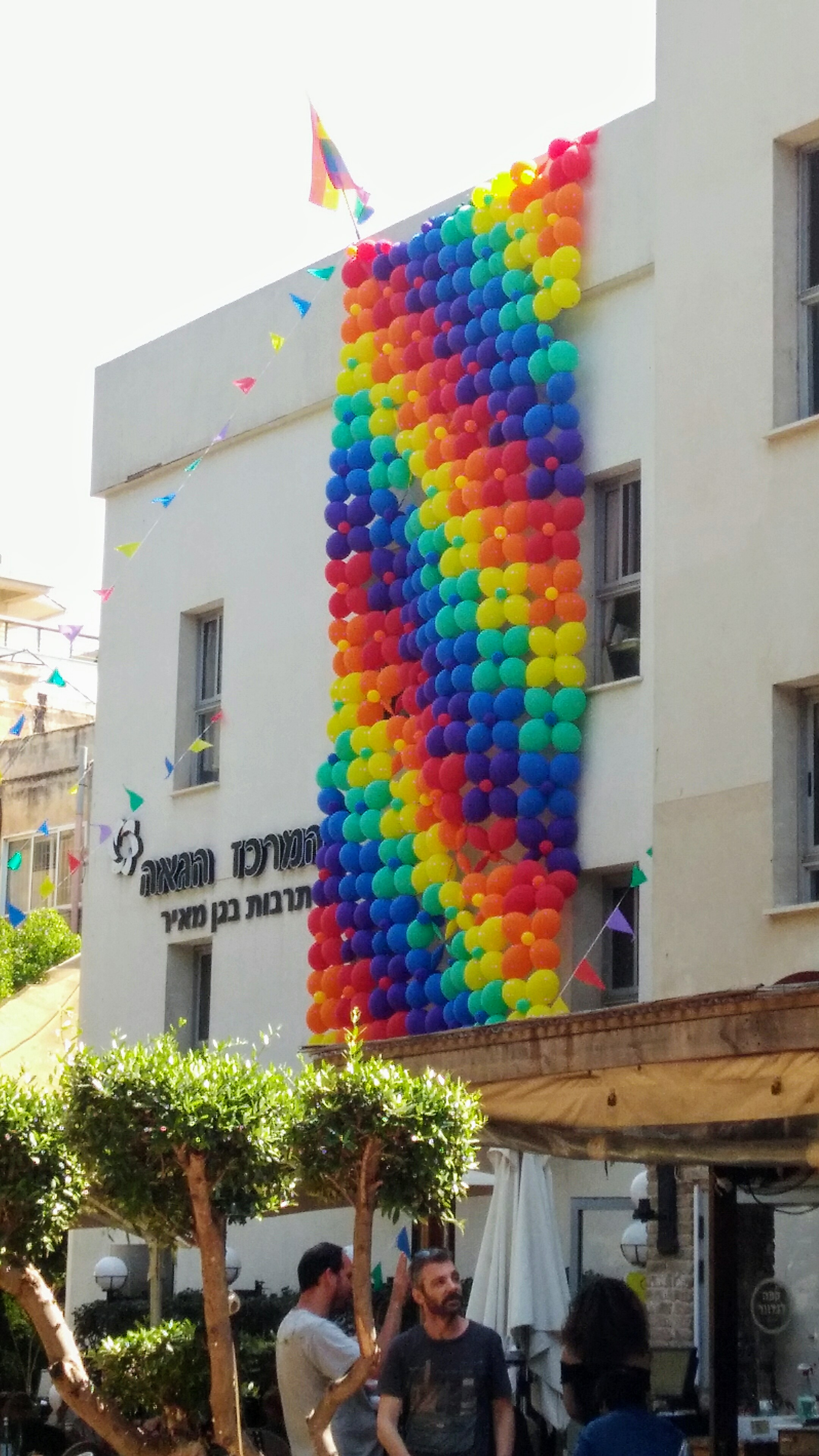
Decorations for the center's tenth anniversary

The center is a municipal agency, funded by the Tel Aviv-Yafo Municipality, which spent NIS 4 million on the building's refurbishment and conversion. It opened its doors in 2008, following a 2004 survey mapping the needs of the LGBT community. Activities fall under six main categories:

- Cultural programs including theatre, dance, concerts, etc.
- Social events
- Community organizations for LGBT youth, parents of LGBT persons, religious groups, transsexuals, seniors, people with HIV, etc.
- Support services: legal, medical, psychological aid, hotline, childcare, etc.
- Learning: lectures and workshops
- Leisure: enrichment activities. The cafe serves as a safe meeting place
