= Nahala =

Nahala (Hebrew: נחלה, romanized: nakhalá, Hebrew pronunciation: [naχaˈla]) means either "heritage" / "inheritance", or "homestead" / "estate" and also appears spelled nachala and nahalah.

When followed by a connected term, the suffix -t is added, thus becoming nahalat (as a feminine noun in the construct form), with the common variant spellings nach(a)lat and nah(a)lat.

It may refer to:

== Places in Israel ==
- Nahala, Israel, a moshav in south-central Israel
- Nahalat Binyamin, a street and neighbourhood in Tel Aviv, Israel
- Nahalat Reuben, the old name of Ness Ziona
- Nahalat Shimon, a neighborhood in Jerusalem
- Nahalat Shiv'a, a neighborhood in Jerusalem
- Nahalat Yitzhak, a neighborhood of Tel Aviv
- Nahalat Yitzhak Cemetery, Givatayim, east of Nahalat Yitzhak neighborhood
- Nachlaot, a grouping of 23 courtyard neighborhoods in central Jerusalem

== Other uses ==
- Nahala or yahrtzeit, a Jewish annual memorial observance of somebody's day of death
- Nachala (organisation), radical settler organization in Israel

== See also ==
- Nahla (disambiguation), Arabic common noun and derived name and toponym
- Nahalal, moshav in northern Israel
