= Carmel Market bombing =

2004 Palestinian suicide attack in Tel Aviv, Israel

- Part of the Second Intifada militancy campaign
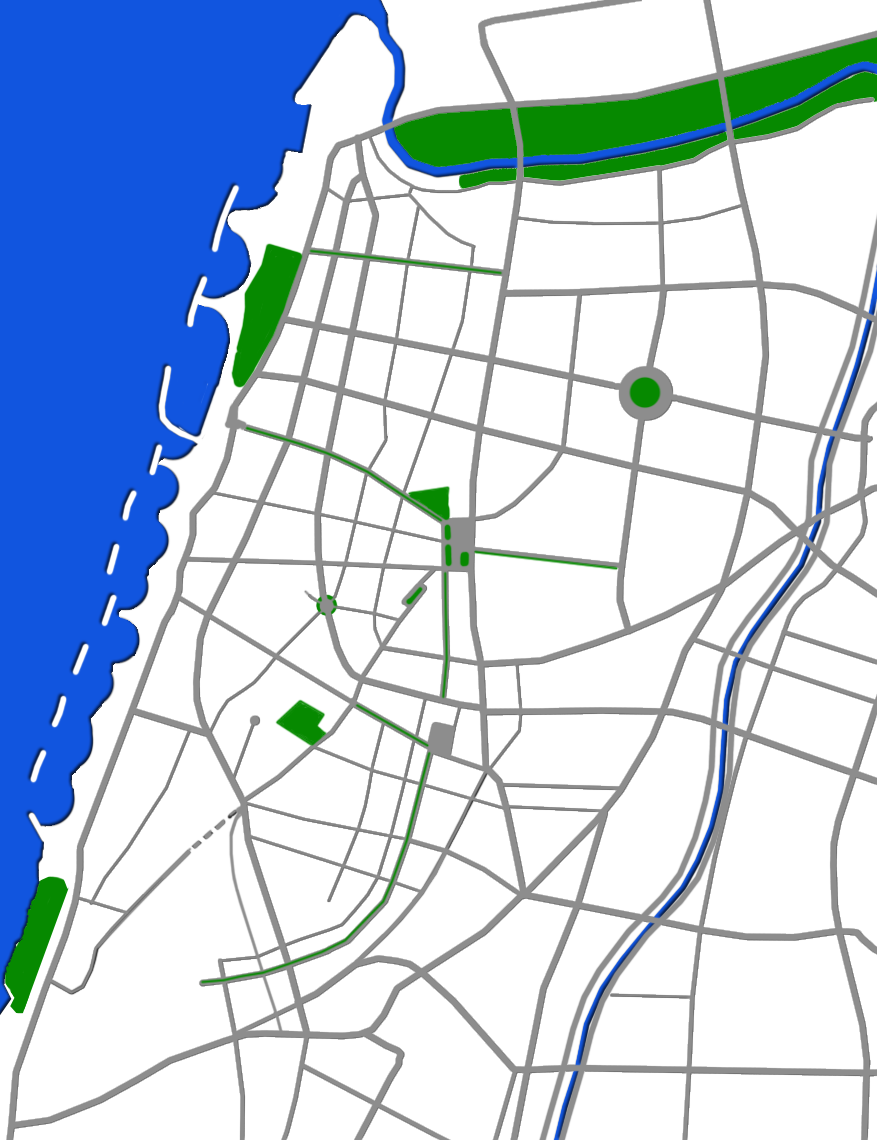
- Native name: הפיגוע בשוק הכרמל
- Location: 32°4′7″N 34°46′9″E; Carmel Market, Tel Aviv, Israel
- Date: 1 November 2004; 22 years ago 11:15 am (UTC+2)
- Attack type: Suicide bombing
- Weapon: 5 kilograms (11 lb) explosive device
- Deaths: 3 Israeli civilians (+1 bomber)
- Injuries: 50+ Israeli civilians
- Perpetrator: PFLP claimed responsibility
- No. of participants: 1

The Carmel Market bombing was a suicide bombing which occurred on 1 November 2004 at the Carmel Market located at the heart of Tel Aviv's business district. Three civilians were killed in the attack and over 50 people were injured.

The Popular Front for the Liberation of Palestine claimed responsibility for the attack.

== The attack ==
On Monday, 1 November 2004, shortly after 11:00 am, a Palestinian suicide bomber wearing an explosive belt hidden underneath his clothes detonated the explosive device at the Carmel Market located at the heart of Tel Aviv's business district.

The blast killed three civilians and injured over 30 people.

== The perpetrator ==
The Palestinian Marxist–Leninist militant group Popular Front for the Liberation of Palestine claimed responsibility for the attack, and stated that the attack was carried out by a 16-year-old Palestinian named Amar Alfar who originated from the Palestinian city of Nablus in the West Bank.

== Official reactions ==
Involved parties

Israel: Israeli Foreign Ministry spokesman urged the Palestinian Authority to crack down on armed militants.

Palestinian territories:

- Palestinian National Authority - Palestinian leader Yasser Arafat condemned the attack and called on both Palestinians and Israelis to avoid killing civilians.
- Palestinian Prime Minister Ahmed Qurei called for an end to the Palestinian suicide bombings.

== See also ==
- Basem Khandakji
