= Nahala, Israel =

Moshav in southern Israel

Nahala: נַחֲלָה (Hebrew); نحلا (Arabic)
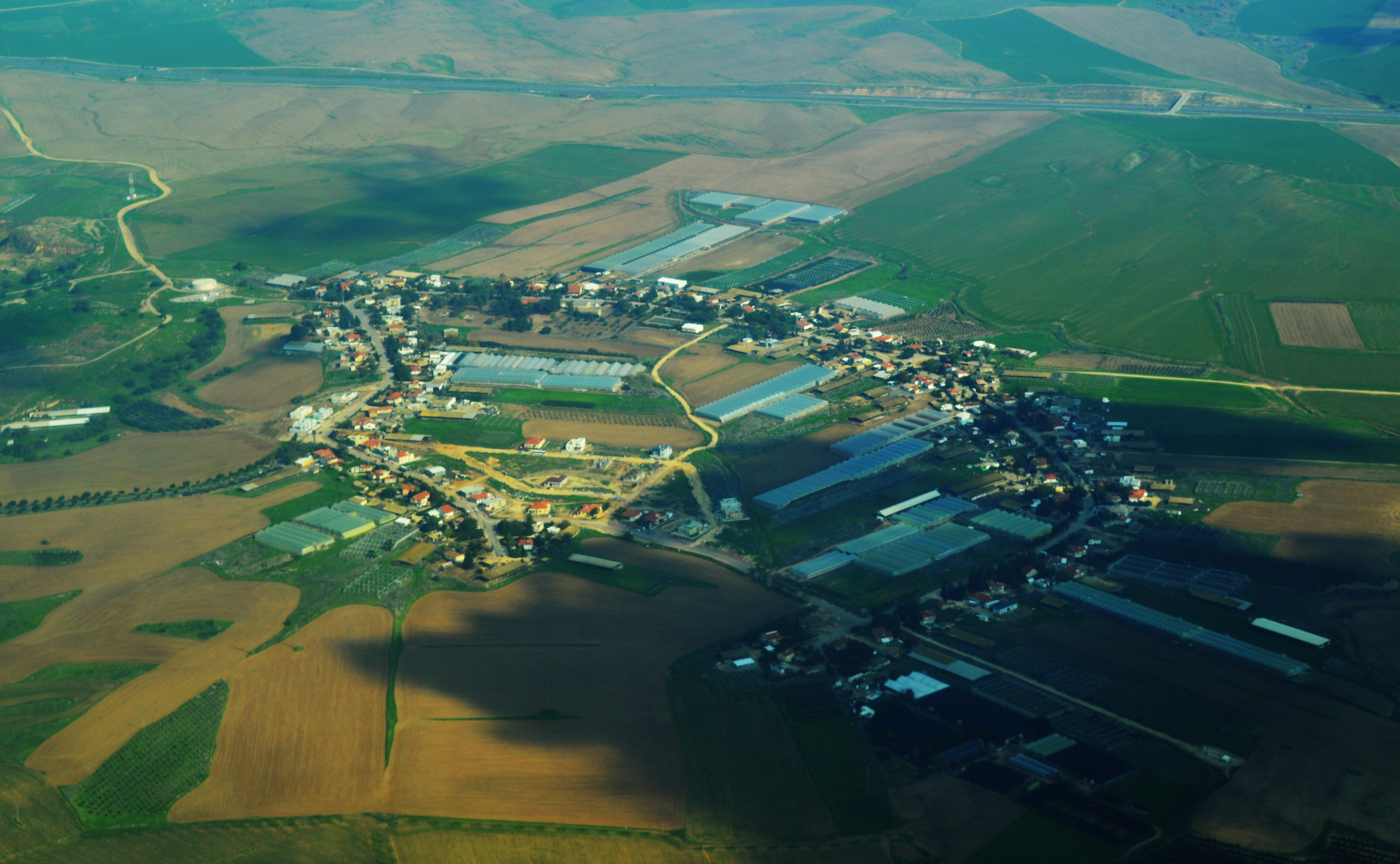

- Location within Ashkelon region of Israel
- Coordinates: 31°39′33″N 34°47′39″E
- Country: Israel
- District: Southern
- Subdistrict: Ashkelon
- Council: Yoav
- Affiliation: Moshavim Movement
- Founded: 1953
- Founder: Yemeni Jews
- Population (2024): 733

Nahala (Hebrew: נַחֲלָה, lit. Estate) is a moshav in south-central Israel. Located a few kilometers north of Kiryat Gat and south of Kiryat Malakhi., it falls under the jurisdiction of Yoav Regional Council. In 2024, it had a population of 733.

== History ==
The community was founded in 1953 by Yemeni Jewish refugees, on the lands of the depopulated Palestinian village of Summil. The founders had originally established moshav Agur in 1950. Along with the neighboring Menuha, it was named for the Menuha VeNahala (Hebrew: מנוחה ונחלה) organization that founded Rehovot.

== See also ==
- Nahala
