= Masaryk Square =

Public square in Tel Aviv, Israel

Coordinates: 32°04′42″N 34°46′42″E

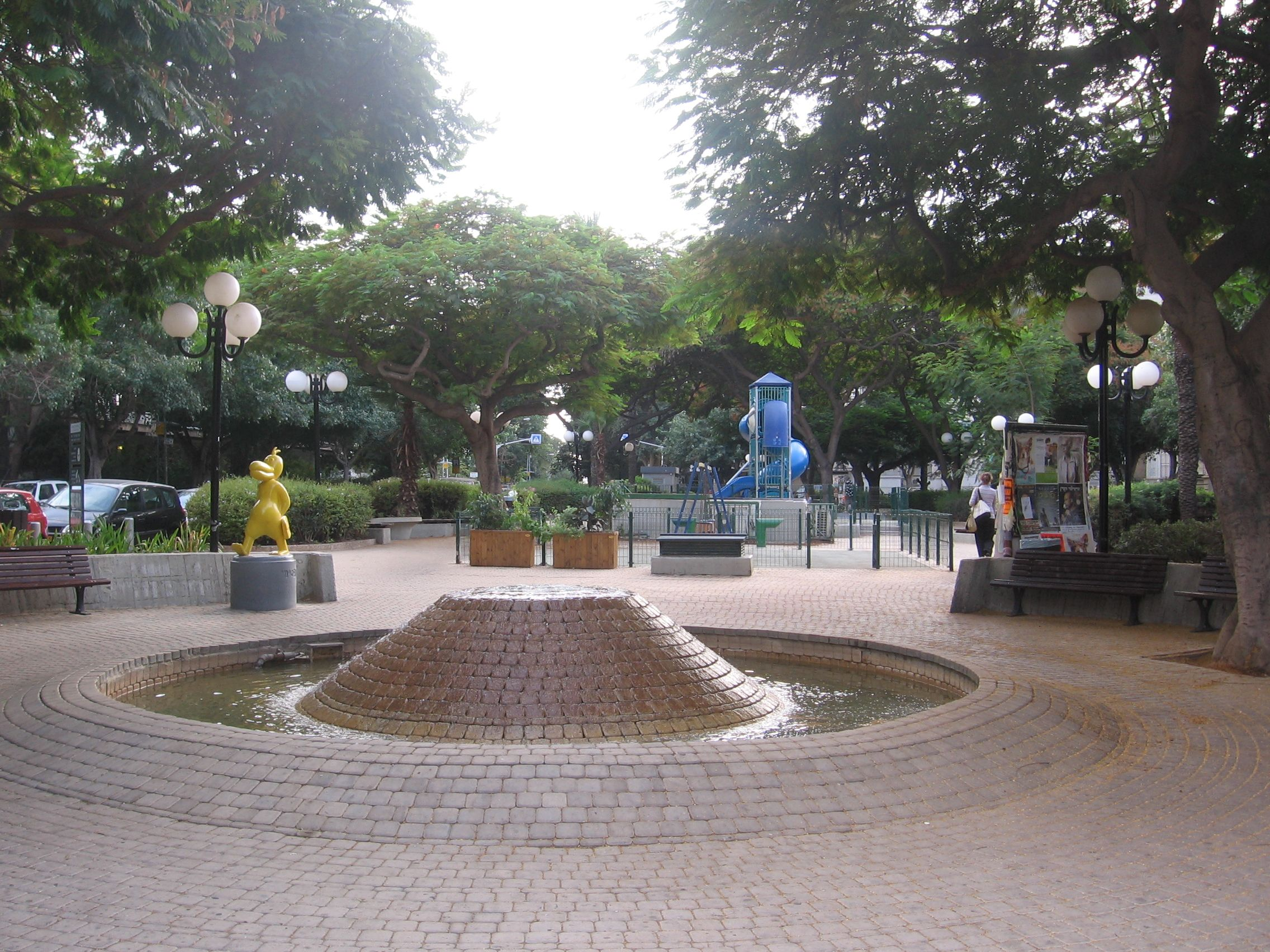
Masaryk Square

Masaryk Square (Hebrew: כיכר מסריק) is a public square in central Tel Aviv, Israel.

It is named for Tomáš Garrigue Masaryk, the first President of Czechoslovakia. Before First Czechoslovak Republic was established in 1918, Masaryk played a role in the Hilsner affair, an antisemitic blood libel targeting Leopold Hilsner, a Jewish villager in Austria-Hungary.

Masaryk, then a professor at the Czech University in Prague, fought for Hilsner. As president, he represented the humanitarian interests of the Czech nation and its policy of religious tolerance. At that time, Czechoslovakia officially recognized Jewish nationality and granted Jews full civil rights. During the Masaryk era, three congresses of the World Zionist Organization took place there, in Prague and Karlovy Vary. Masaryk was a supporter of the Zionist movement and was the first head of state to visit the Yishuv in 1927.

The Duck is an iconic yellow sculpture in Masaryk Square that commemorates Tel Aviv illustrator and comic book artist Dudu Geva.
