= Meir Park, Tel Aviv =

Public park in Tel Aviv, Israel

Meir Park
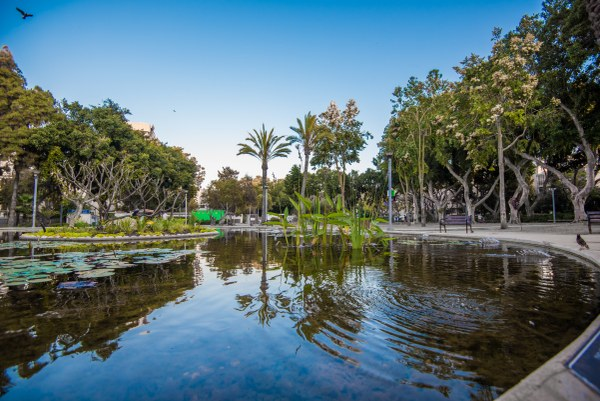
- Interactive map of Meir Park
- Type: municipal
- Coordinates: 32.0733°N 34.773°E
- Created: 1944
- Operator: Tel Aviv Municipality
- Status: Open

Meir Park (Hebrew: גן מאיר, Gan Meir) is a park dating back to the early 1940s in the center of Tel Aviv, Israel. It is named after the first mayor of Tel Aviv, Meir Dizengoff and is home to the Tel Aviv LGBTQ Center.
