= Nahla =

Nahla may refer to:

- Nahla, Iraq, a valley in northern Iraq
- Nahla (name), an Arabic feminine given name meaning "drink of water" or “honey bee”
- Nahla (film), a 1979 Algerian film

== See also ==
- Nahala (disambiguation)
