= Allenby Street =

Street in Tel Aviv, Israel

Coordinates: 32°4′2.42″N 34°46′16.6″E

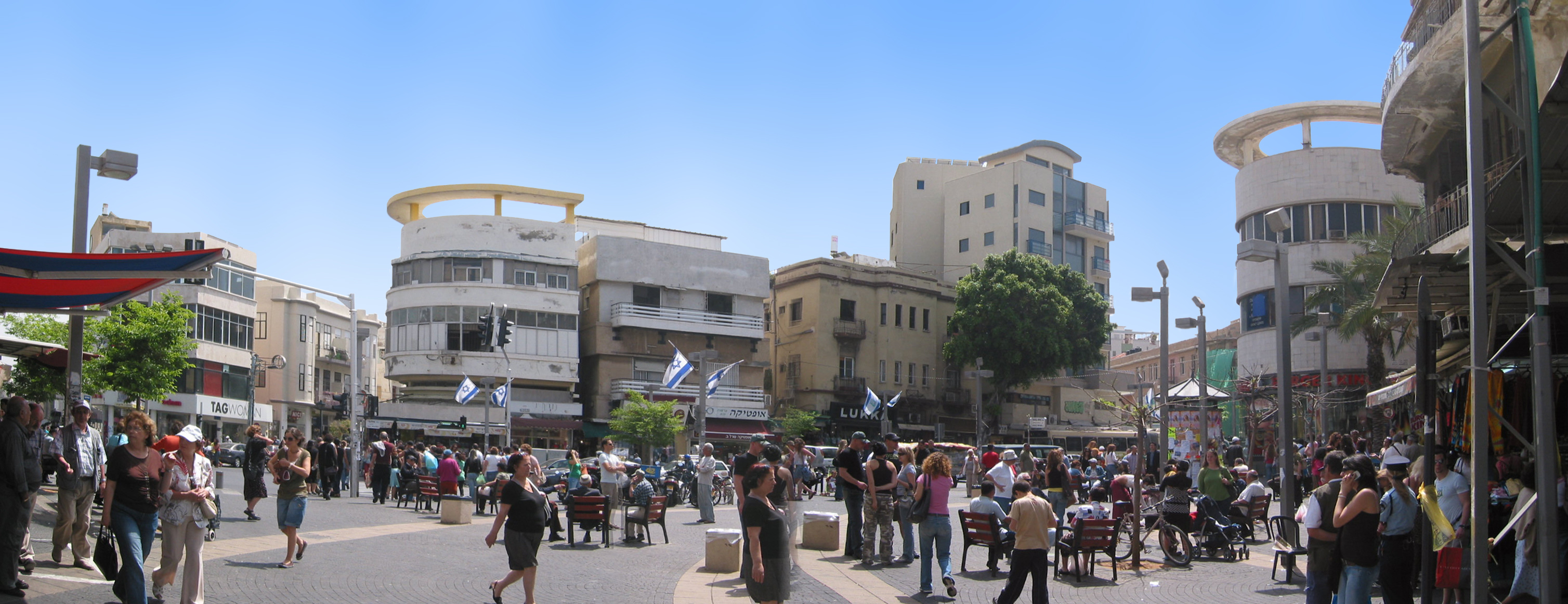
Magen David Square

Allenby Street (Hebrew: רחוב אלנבי, romanized: Rekhóv Álenbi) is a major street in Tel Aviv, Israel. It was named in honor of Field Marshal Viscount Allenby.

Allenby Street stretches from the Mediterranean Sea in the northwest to HaAliya Street in the southeast. It was first paved with concrete in 1914. During the day, it is a commercial street with many small businesses and clothing stores. At night, its cafés, pubs and restaurants throng with people. Many public buses run along Allenby Street.

To traverse northward along the street, one will encounter Tel Aviv’s renowned outdoor market, Shuk HaCarmel. In close proximity lies Nahalat Binyamin Street, characterized by a composition of hotels, bars and cafés.

== Landmarks ==
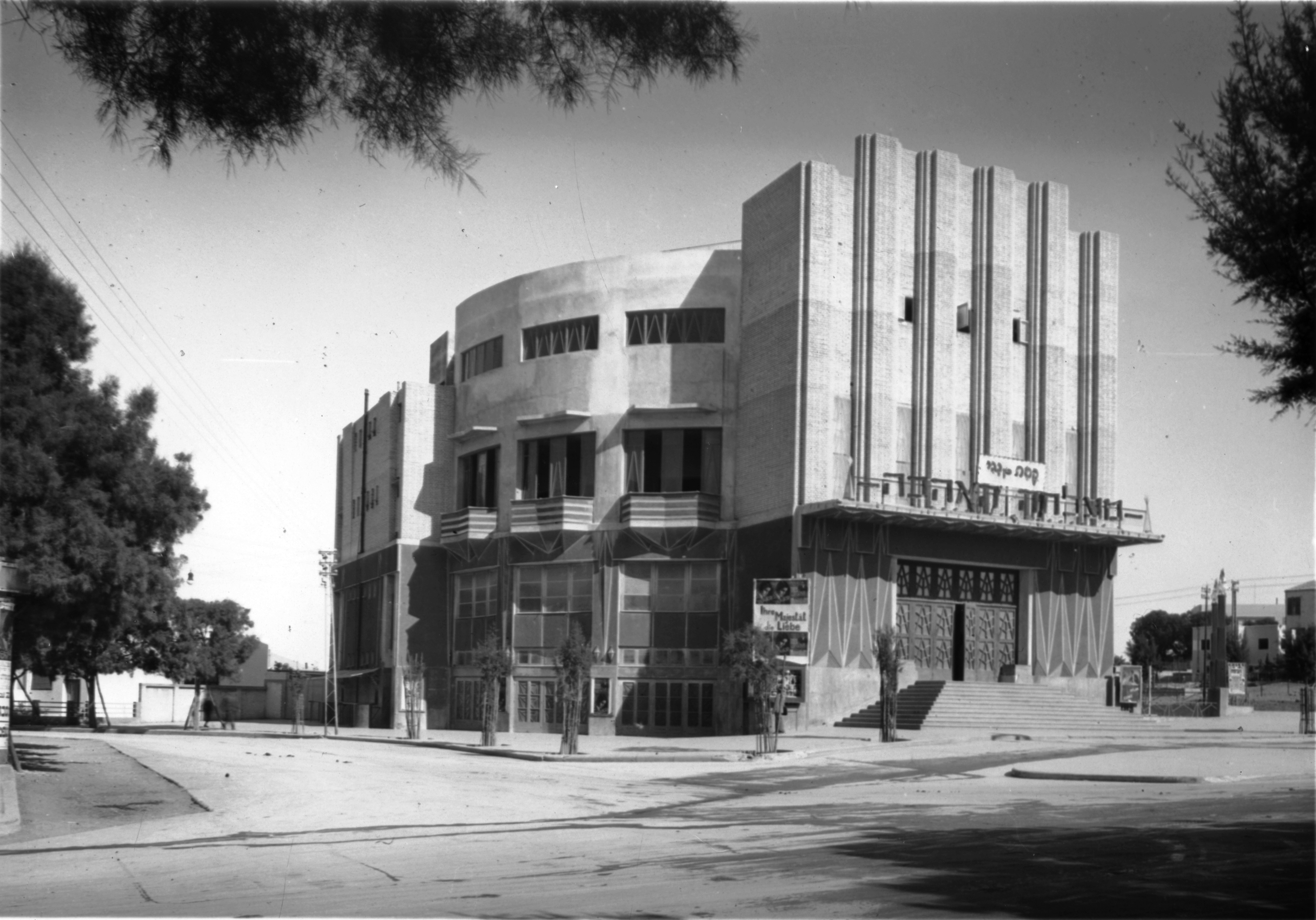
Historical photo of Mugrabi theatre

=== Lederberg House ===
The 1925 Lederberg House, at the intersection of Rothschild Boulevard and Allenby, features a series of large ceramic murals designed by Ze'ev Raban of the Bezalel school. The four murals show a Jewish pioneer sowing and harvesting, a shepherd, and Jerusalem with a verse from Jeremiah 31:4, "Again I will rebuild thee and thou shalt be rebuilt."
