= Abby Stein =

American author, rabbi, activist speaker

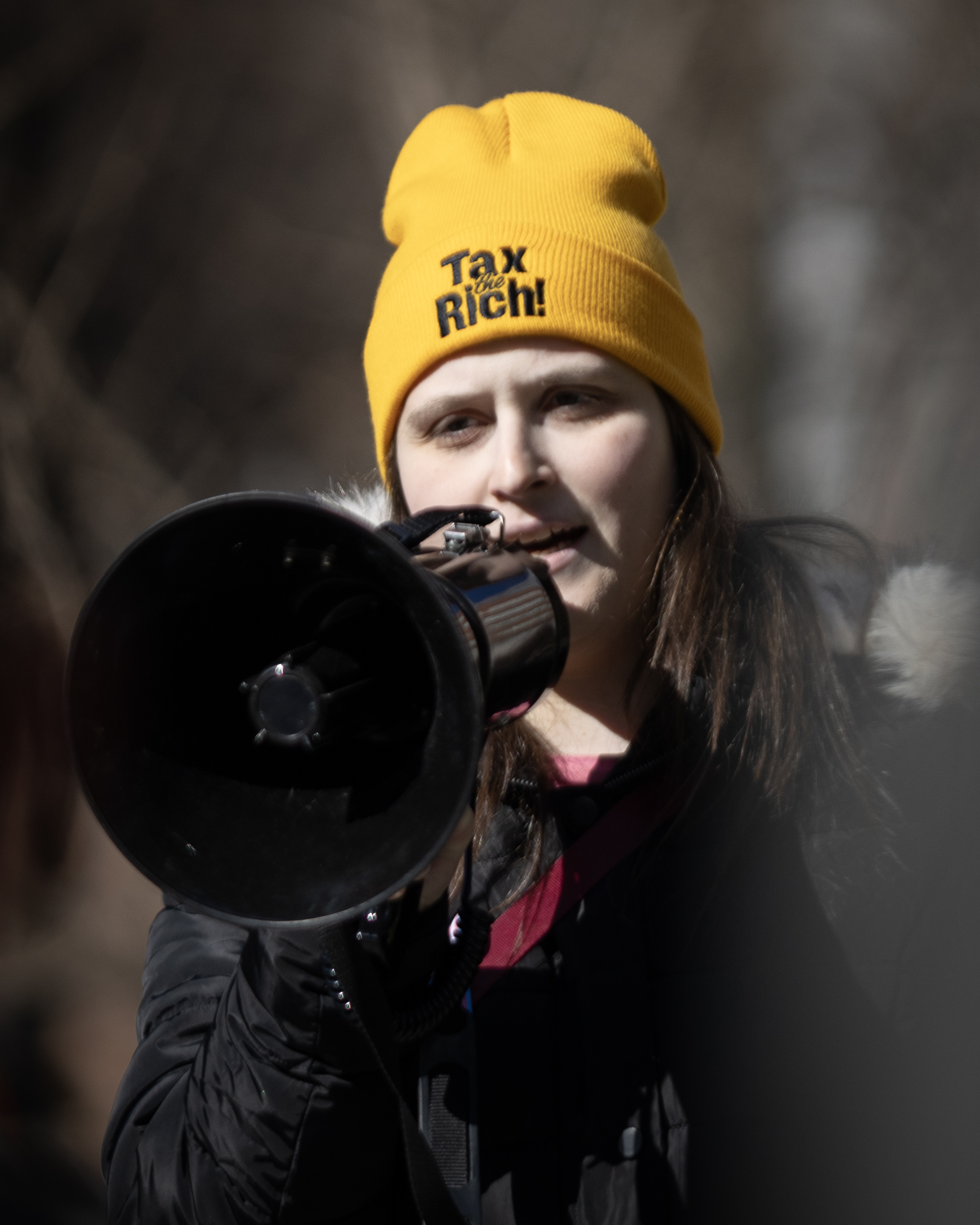
- Stein in 2026
- Born: October 1, 1991 (age 35); New York City, U.S.
- Education: Yeshivath Viznitz (semikhah); Columbia University
- Occupations: Rabbi; activist; author
- Years active: 2012–present
- Known for: Transgender activism
- Television: Dark Net
- Spouse: Fraidy Horowitz (m. 2010–2013)
- Children: 1
- Relatives: Menachem Mendel Stein, Savraner rabbi (father) Mordechai Stein of Faltishan (grandfather) Baal Shem Tov (ancestor)
- Writing career
- Genre: non-fiction
- Subjects: Memoir, LGBTQ literature, Jewish literature
- Notable work: Becoming Eve: My Journey from Ultra-Orthodox Rabbi to Transgender Woman
- Website: abbystein.com

Abby Chava Stein (Yiddish: אביגיל חוה שטיין; born October 1, 1991) is an Israeli-American author, rabbi, activist, blogger, model, public speaker, and political consultant. A former member of New York's Haredi Jewish community and an ordained Orthodox rabbi, Stein made headlines after she came out as a trans woman in 2015.

After going public about her gender identity, Stein founded support groups for transgender people from religious backgrounds and published a memoir, Becoming Eve: My Journey from Ultra-Orthodox Rabbi to Transgender Woman. Between fall 2024 and summer 2025, she served as a part-time rabbi for Congregation Kolot Chayeinu, a progressive synagogue.

== Early life ==
Stein was born on October 1, 1991, in Williamsburg, Brooklyn, to Israeli American Rabbi Menachem Mendel Stein, the sixth-born of thirteen children. Through her father, she is a member of the Ukrainian Hasidic dynasties Savran and Skver and a 10th-generation descendant of Rabbi Israel Ben Eliezer, better known as Baal Shem Tov, the founder of Hasidic Judaism. She was born into a large family, having over 200 first cousins. Among her cousins is actor Luzer Twersky, who would also later leave the Hasidic community. She was assigned male at birth.

Stein's parents are ultra-Orthodox Hasidic Jews. Growing up, Stein was heavily sheltered from the outside world. She was taught Yiddish, Hebrew, and Aramaic but not English and had very limited access to literature, music, and the internet. (Note: "Abby's early life was defined by an extreme iteration of Jewish practice, but more relaxed forms of traditional Judaism are also divided along gender lines. Sacred Jewish texts, and by extension Jewish law, are in fact predicated upon an assumption of gender duality. A person's sex determines what religious practices he or she is obliged to perform, and how he or she is expected to behave in social contexts.") Though unaware of the existence of gender dysphoria, Stein exhibited signs of being transgender as a child. She wanted a dollhouse to play with and to wear bright colors, something men in her community couldn't do. At age four, her mother caught her harming her genitals with a pin, and at age nine, she prayed nightly, asking God to turn her into a girl.

As a teenager, Stein was educated in both general and religious studies at several yeshivas alongside other young Orthodox men. At 16, she was expelled for questioning religion and rebellious acts. She was sent to study at Yeshiva Viznitz, an all-boys Jewish boarding school over 100 miles away, in Kiamesha Lake, New York. There, Stein had a long-term secret romance with a classmate.

While still in school, Stein's parents arranged for her to be married. After screening thousands of women, they chose Fraidy Horowitz based on a combination of her family history, genetic testing, and personality. Stein was uneducated about sex, only learning that women had vaginas a few days before her wedding to Horowitz, when a rabbi instructed her on how to consummate her marriage. They married in 2010, when Stein was 18.

Stein received her semikhah in 2011. Her and Horowitz's only child was born in 2012. After attending her son's circumcision ceremony, Stein had a revelation that she needed to leave the Hasidic community. She contacted Footsteps, a New York City-based non-profit organization that helps Jews leave the Ultra-Orthodox community, and with their help, she left Williamsburg in 2012, a decision she described as "life-saving." Her separation from Horowitz was an amicable one and the two agreed to shared custody of their son. Stein struggled to assimilate into mainstream society due to the cultural and language barriers, describing her experience as "being an immigrant in her own country." Stein came out to her father as transgender in 2015.

== Coming out ==
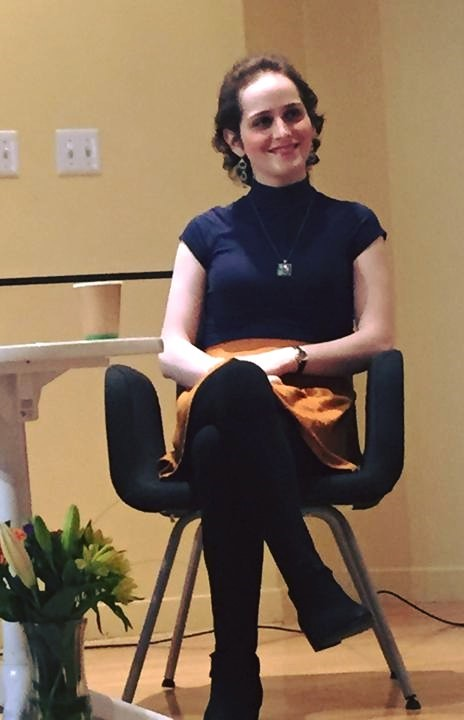
Abby Stein at University of California, Berkeley in April 2016

In November 2015, Stein made headlines when she came out on her blog as transgender, while studying at Columbia University, and started physical transition. She was featured in some major media outlets, including The New York Times, the New York Post, New York Magazine, NBC, the Daily Dot, and more. She has also appeared on CNN, Fox News, HuffPost Live, and Vice Canada. Stein also appeared on a number of international TV networks, (Note: See below under filmography.) newspapers, and magazines in over 20 different languages.

When Stein left her community in 2012 and came out as an atheist, her parents said that no matter Stein's choices in life, she would remain their child. After coming out as trans, though, her father told her that, "You should know that this means I might not be able to talk to you ever again." Since then, her parents have shunned her and stopped talking to her altogether. She has also received some hate from her former community, but, in an interview with Chasing News (a Fox News short film company), Stein said that she received less hate than some people would have expected. She described her life post-transition as "better than I could have ever imagined". In 2020, Stein told Hadassah magazine that of her immediate family, only two of her siblings maintain contact with her.

Stein was featured in the 2016 Showtime Documentary series, Dark Net, in episode 8, "Revolt".

=== Naming celebration ===
On June 4, 2016, Stein celebrated her transition and announced her name change to Abby Chava Stein at Romemu, a Jewish Renewal synagogue on the Upper West Side of Manhattan. In an interview with The Huffington Post, she said that even though she did not believe in God, she wanted to celebrate in a synagogue:

I wanted to show that if you claim being trans is unacceptable in traditional Judaism, well, here is a community that is not just okay with accepting me as I am, but is celebrating with me, rejoicing with me. What I'm hoping is that by sharing my story, others in the same situation will realize that you can have your name changed in a synagogue. There are so many synagogues where you can't, but there are also those where you can – the Jewish Reform movement, the Conservative movement. Within Orthodoxy, there's still a long way to go. Every time something like this is done, it's one step closer to acceptance for everyone.

== Publications ==
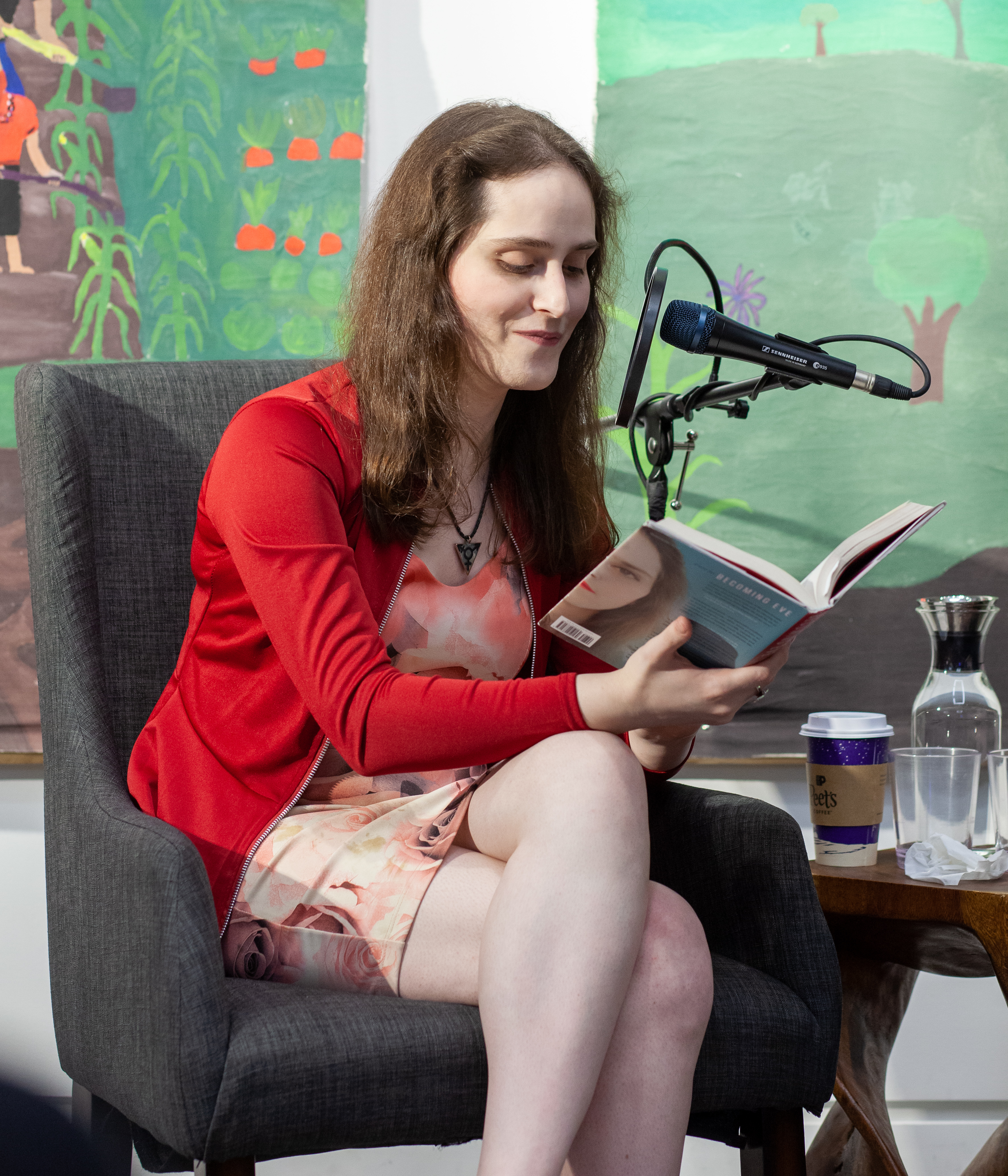
Stein reads from her book, Becoming Eve, during a December 2019 talk at the California Institute of Integral Studies.

=== Books ===
Stein's first book, Becoming Eve: My Journey from Ultra Orthodox Rabbi to Transgender Woman, a memoir, was published by Seal Press (Hachette) on November 12, 2019. The book became a best seller.

Becoming Eve has been translated into Dutch, and was published under the title Eigenlijk Eva: Mijn transitie van ultraorthodoxe rabbi tot trans-vrouw by De Geus on January 18, 2022.

Stein's second book, Sources of Pride, an anthology of Jewish texts on "Identity, Gender, Sexuality, and Inclusivity, in Jewish Texts from the Torah to Kabbalah, Hasidic Teachings, and Contemporary Sources." The book will be a collection of her source sheets on Sefaria. It is to be published by Ben Yehuda Press, who describe the book as "Jewish views on gender and sexuality anthologized from Biblical, Talmudic, Midrashic, Rabbinic, and Chassidic sources with contemporary and personal commentary," with publication date set for September 2, 2025.

Stein was profiled in, and wrote the foreword for, Peter Bussian's book of portraits, Trans New York: Photos and Stories of Transgender New Yorkers. In the foreword, she described her love for New York City – both while in the Hasidic community, and now living as a Queer person in New York.

=== Essays ===
Her writings have also been published in Queer Disbelief: Why LGBTQ Equality is an Atheist Issue, written by Camille Beredjick, edited by Hemant Mehta, and published by Friendly Atheist. Stein wrote an essay specifically for the book, titled, Trans Woman (and Former Hasidic Jew): Atheists Should Support the LGBTQ Movement (ISBN 978-0692989647).

Stein's essay about COVID-19 and its impact on the LGBTQ community, titled, "COVID has exploded Jewish LGBTQ acceptance online. There's no going back." (originally published on Forward.com,) was included in When We Turned Within: Reflections on COVID-19, an anthology of 165 essays edited by Sarah Tuttle-Singer and Menachem Creditor.

Another one of Stein's essays on the current political climate, titled "When One Line Makes All the Difference" - reflecting on President Joe Biden's victory speech (on November 7, 2020), and his mentioning of the transgender community (originally published online by T'ruah (of which Stein is a rabbinic member), as part of their "Torah 20/20" series.) - was published in the 2021 anthology No Time for Neutrality: American Rabbinic Voices from an Era of Upheaval.

Stein's essay titled "Bring Them In," based on her remarks as part of the 24 hour "Call To Unite," hosted by Tim Shriver and Oprah Winfrey, was published in The Call to Unite.

Stein also contributed to Jewels of Elul: A Letter to Myself XII, a collection of essays published by singer / songwriter and music producer, Craig Taubman. Her essay, titled, "Dayeinu" ("Enough" in Hebrew), focused on the question of "What If?", and explored an answer to the question of "What If you would have been" born or raised in different circumstances.

Stein also contributed an essay to Kaye Blegvad's The Pink Book: An Illustrated Celebration of the Color, from Bubblegum to Battleships, discussing her relationship with the color pink, the Hasidic community and the color, and her feelings about stereotypical femininity.

=== Online essays ===
- "‘I Was Raised a Hasidic Man. When I Came Out as a Woman, the Sexism Shocked Me’" a piece about sexism, both in the Hasidic community, and her experience with sexism after coming out. Published in Glamour Magazine.
- "On the Set of ‘Unorthodox,’ I Brushed Up Against My Hasidic Past" about her experience on set of the Unorthodox TV show, where she played a Hasidic woman, wearing a traditional head covering for Jewish women. Published in Alma.
- "Makah/Plague of the Binary" a poem about the "plague" of the gender binary and binary thinking as a whole, counting 10 plagues. It was published by the Jewish Book Council as part of a project of 10 authors and artists responding to 10 modern plagues, for Passover 2021, the second Passover of the COVID-19 pandemic.
- "What I hope we learn from two Passovers in social distancing exile" a prose style piece about celebrating the second Passover with Covid restrictions. Published in the Jewish Daily Forward's Scribe.
- "NYC pols, don't weaponize our pain over the Mideast violence" an op-ed about the 2023 Bombardment of Gaza, calling on NYC politicians to stop weaponizing the conflict. The piece was written in collaboration with Jews for Racial and Economic Justice, and was also published in the print edition.
- "We Spoke Up For Palestine and Got Kicked Out of the White House Pride Party" an op-ed about her experience at the 2024 White House Pride Party she attended with Lily Greenberg Call as her "plus one". The piece was then covered in the online LGBTQ Nation Magazine, Autostraddle as well as by international media, including in Hebrew in the Israeli Mako, the online version of Channel 12.

== Activism ==
After coming out, Stein started an online support group to help trans people who come from Orthodox backgrounds. Stein also said that Facebook and online support communities have been her lifeline while leaving her community, which made her realize the positive power of online communities.

In December 2015, Stein founded a support group for trans people from Orthodox backgrounds. The group's first meeting had 12 people attending, most of them fellow Hasids struggling with their gender identity. Stein's avid blogging also gained her a big following in the Jewish community, and she has become a role model for former ultra-Orthodox Jews – both LGBTQ and not.

In addition to transgender activism, Stein has also been active in several projects to help those going off the derech and leaving the ultra-Orthodox community. She has been working with Footsteps, and its Canadian sister organization, Forward, for which she traveled to Montreal in 2016 to help jump-start. In addition, she has also done some lay advocacy work with YAFFED, working towards a better education in the Hasidic schools, for which she has also engaged in political work.

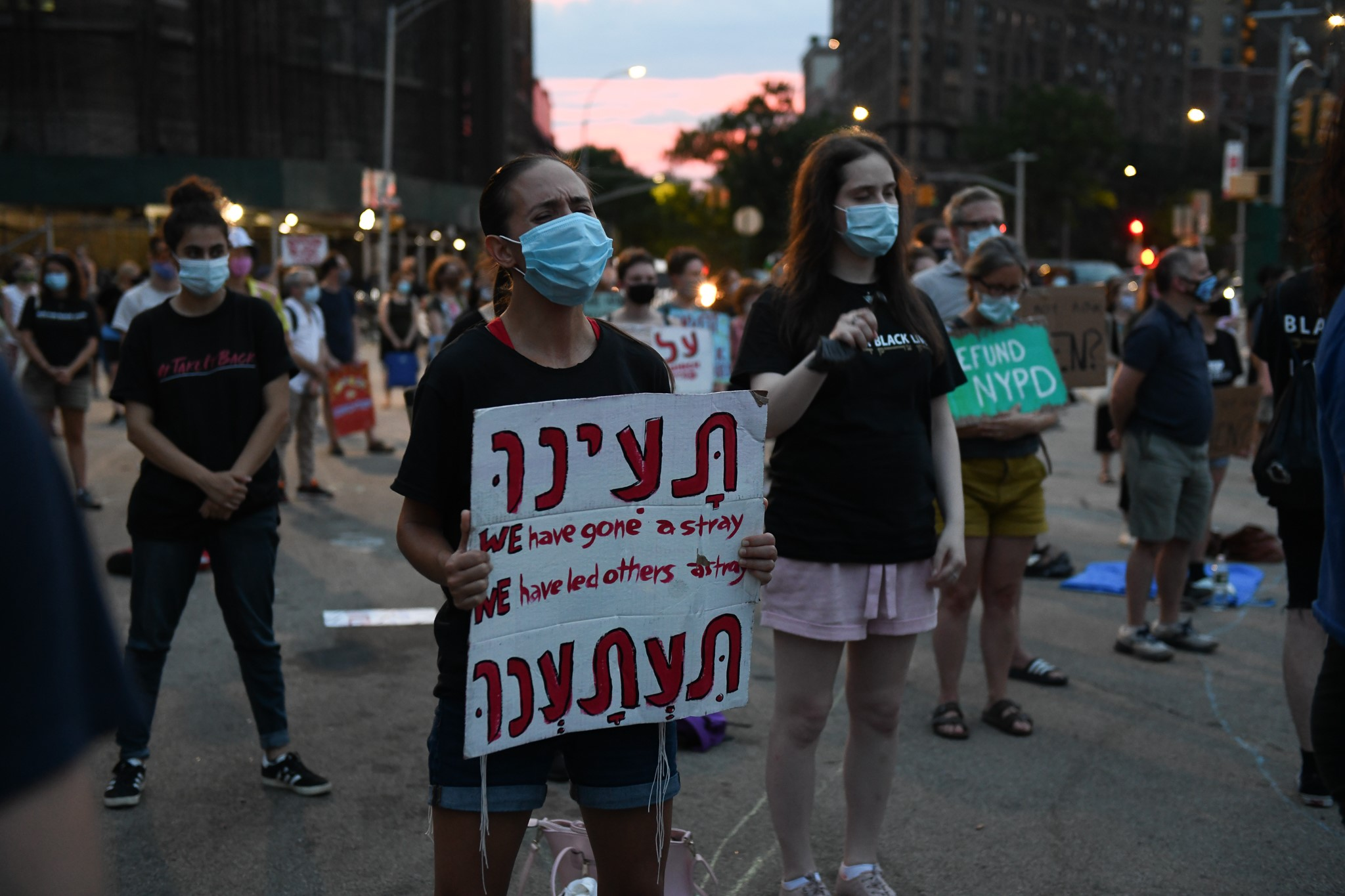
Stein (holding a shofar) and her then girlfriend, at a Black Lives Matter rally in Grand Army Plaza, Brooklyn, July 2020

In 2018, Stein co-founded her own feminist/womanist multi-faith and inclusive celebration of women and non-binary people of all faith traditions, called Sacred Space, with former Mormon feminist and founder of Ordain Women, human rights lawyer Kate Kelly, and Yale Divinity School professor and Baptist preacher Eboni Marshall-Turman.

Stein has been an outspoken advocate for Palestinian rights. Following the October 7 attacks, Stein, the daughter of an Israeli immigrant, managed her own grief while mobilizing her community in opposition of Israel's increasing violence against Palestinians. She has continued to work towards ceasefire solutions and recognition of human rights violations against Palestinians as a founding member and organizer of Rabbis for Ceasefire. In September 2026, Stein was arrested alongside over 100 protestors at a protest ahead of a speech by Israeli prime minister Benjamin Netanyahu at the United Nations General Assembly.

=== Political campaign activity ===
During the 2020 Democratic Party presidential primaries, Stein supported Bernie Sanders's campaign. In October 2026, Stein was elected as a delegate for the New York City Democratic Socialists of America Convention, the first ever Rabbi elected to such a role.

Stein is a member of the Democratic Socialists of America (DSA). During the 2025 New York City mayoral election, she endorsed Zohran Mamdani. In November 2025 she was appointed to the Mamdani Transition Team Committee. She then continued working with Mayor Mamdani as a consultant, focusing on transgender health care.

=== Modeling ===
Since coming out, Stein has also done several modeling projects depicting her life and transition, which have been published by numerous sites. She told Refinery29 that "I actually liked [shooting]. It did help me feel more comfortable", and that she does these projects to encourage others on their journey. In 2018, she also did several photo shoots and modeling projects with major fashion magazines such as Vogue, Glamour, Elle, and InStyle.

In December 2021 Stein was photographed by Annie Leibovitz as part of Celebrity Cruises' "industry-elevating" All-Inclusive Photo Project. The Project, which according to CNN was "some of the world's most innovative artists and photographers teaming up with a cruise line in a bid to help change the face of travel marketing" was according to Celebrity Cruises "starting a movement to address under-representation in travel marketing through our All-Inclusive Photo Project. In partnership with world-renowned photographers, we have created the world's first open-source photo library featuring ethnic, disabled, curvy and LGBTQ+ changemakers. We invite our industry to join us in changing the face of travel." Stein said about that shoot that “while I don't understand corporate intentions, the people I worked with from Celebrity were all really, really amazing and they really mean it. I think they've done a lot of amazing stuff towards being more inclusive and I'm a big fan of inclusivity. Specifically, actual actions.”

Stein's photo from that shoot was printed in The New York Times Sunday edition on Sunday April 24, 2022, as a double page centerfold feature in the main section.

=== Public speaking ===
Stein's first public appearance was in a promotional video for Footsteps 10th anniversary gala in 2013, where she was interviewed about her experience leaving the ultra-Orthodox Jewish community. Around the same time, she also did interviews with The Wall Street Journal and Haaretz about her experience leaving the community and fighting for custody. She also started giving public speeches on these topics.

In addition to public speaking, she also teaches classes on gender within Judaism, as well as bringing attention to trans people from Orthodox communities. As of November 2016, she has had speeches at several universities. She has also done longer speaking tours to several communities in Montreal, the San Francisco Bay Area, and the New York metropolitan area.

Starting in 2016, Stein has also become a rising star in demand for speaking engagements and conferences, such as the Limmud franchise, where, at the 2017 Limmud NY conference, she spoke more times than any other presenter. At the same time, she has also spoken internationally at conferences such as the American Jewish Joint Distribution Committee's annual Junction Conference in Berlin, and the Miles Nadal JCC's Shavuot in Toronto.

A big part of Stein's events have been with Hillel International affiliates all over the world. According to a 2017 report by Hillel, "Stein has visited more than 100 campuses, sharing her story with thousands of students, in hopes of teaching them the importance of inclusivity, and that 'Judaism and queerness are not a contradiction'." Her events drew hundreds of students, where she talks about her life, Transgender in Judaism, Intersectionality, policy, and politics, as it relates to the LGBTQ community, and consulting on how to be more inclusive.

Stein is today a globally recognized author, activist, and speaker. As of July 2020, she has given over 400 speeches at venues worldwide.

=== Women's March leadership ===
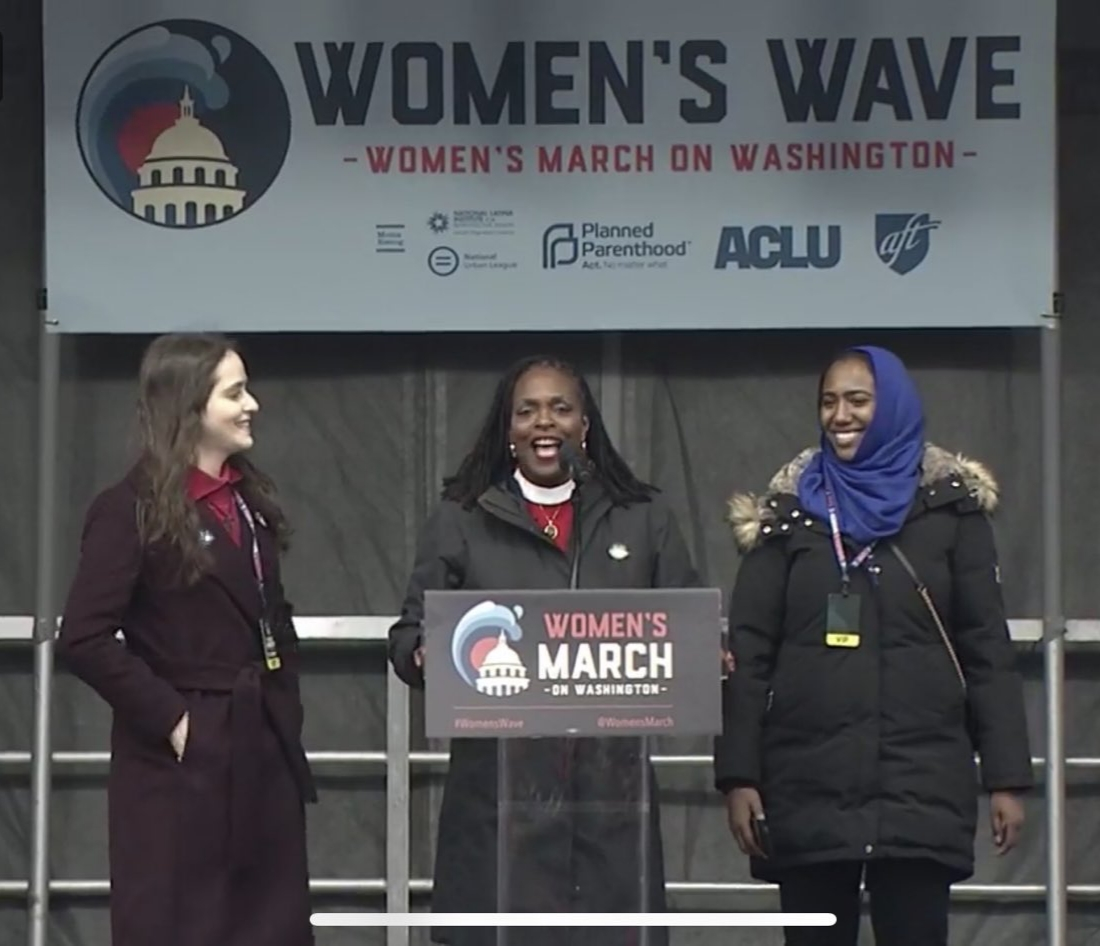
Stein on stage at the 2019 Women's March

In early 2019, Stein joined the Women's March leadership, as a member of the 2019 Steering Committee. Despite some controversy surrounding the March and its leadership, Stein said that, "I'm convinced that working with Women's March people, we can gain so much more by working together, even when there might be some parts we feel uncomfortable with", and "expressed solidarity with other Jewish women who are supporting the march on grounds that it has emerged as an important and growing coalition of marginalized groups, including Jews, African Americans, Hispanics, and LGBT people".

During the rally following the march, Stein also spoke on stage alongside Reverend Jacqui Lewis, senior minister of Middle Collegiate Church, and Muslim activist Remaz Abdelgader, leading the spiritual invocation opening the rally. During her speech, which she started with the traditional greeting of "Shabbat Shalom", she related the march to the Exodus, leading the audience in chants denouncing different forms of prejudice and oppression, with a chant of "Let It Go!". She also called for unity, saying that, "A lot of people out there, a lot of people in the media are trying to divide us. What brings us together is not the fact that we are all the same. What brings us together is our differences."

In 2020, Stein was a featured speaker at the Women's March NYC, in Foley Square.

== Rabbinical work ==
For a few years after leaving the Hasidic community, and later coming out, Stein did not work as a rabbi at all. About the first two years after leaving, she told HuffPost "I felt very much disenfranchised from God. One rabbi called it “Post-God Traumatic Disorder.” When God is just this really bad person who is going to punish you. I was like, “That's it. I don't want to know anything about the Jewish religion. This is all bulls**t.” Later on, she started practicing Judaism again, saying “I don't believe in God, but I believe in Judaism,” naming specifically the Jewish year cycle, as well as Jewish music, food, and spirituality, as details that made her reembrace some Jewish practices. About celebrating Shabbat she said that while she is not observant in an Orthodox sense, marking Shabbat with simple rituals such as candle lighting helped ground her when she was going through a hard time before coming out, and that "it became a mental health and spiritual practice." On her social media she posts almost weekly posts of her celebrating Shabbat.

By 2019 she has re-embraced her title and work as a rabbi, leaning into the knowledge she got in her training to advance LGBTQ right and social justice." She also said that “I have found that even the most secular Jews have a certain type of respect when you say, ‘rabbi,’” and she has used that ability to talk more about how Judaism and Jewish texts have space for queer and trans people, saying that “While I don't think that we need text to justify who we are... I do think that [texts] create something so beautiful and powerful.” While making a video teaching Jewish texts with the Jewish Daily Forward, she said that “I'm hoping that looking at these texts and sharing them could help us all, if we wish, to find a space for us within Judaism to learn not to tolerate who we are, but to celebrate who we are.” Stein also partnered with the Yiddish Forverts to create content in her native Yiddish on the topic of gender and transgender in Judaism.

Stein currently serves in the capacity of a rabbi on NCJW's "Rabbis for Repro" board, overseeing "a network of Jewish clergy who have pledged to preach, teach, and advocate for abortion justice," which currently has over 1,500 members.

Stein is an active member of the rabbinical group T'ruah: The Rabbinic Call for Human Rights, as well as a member of the rabbinical advocacy group "Tirdof: New York Jewish Clergy for Justice" which is a partnership between T'ruah and Jews for Racial and Economic Justice (JFREJ).

A February 2022 article in Distractify claimed that the transgender rabbi character (played by Hari Nef) in episode 10 of And Just Like That... was based on Stein.

As of the High Holy Days 5784 (September 2023), Stein has been working as a rabbi and scholar-in-residence at The New Shul, a Non-Denominational progressive synagogue in Manhattan's West Village.

== Honors and awards ==
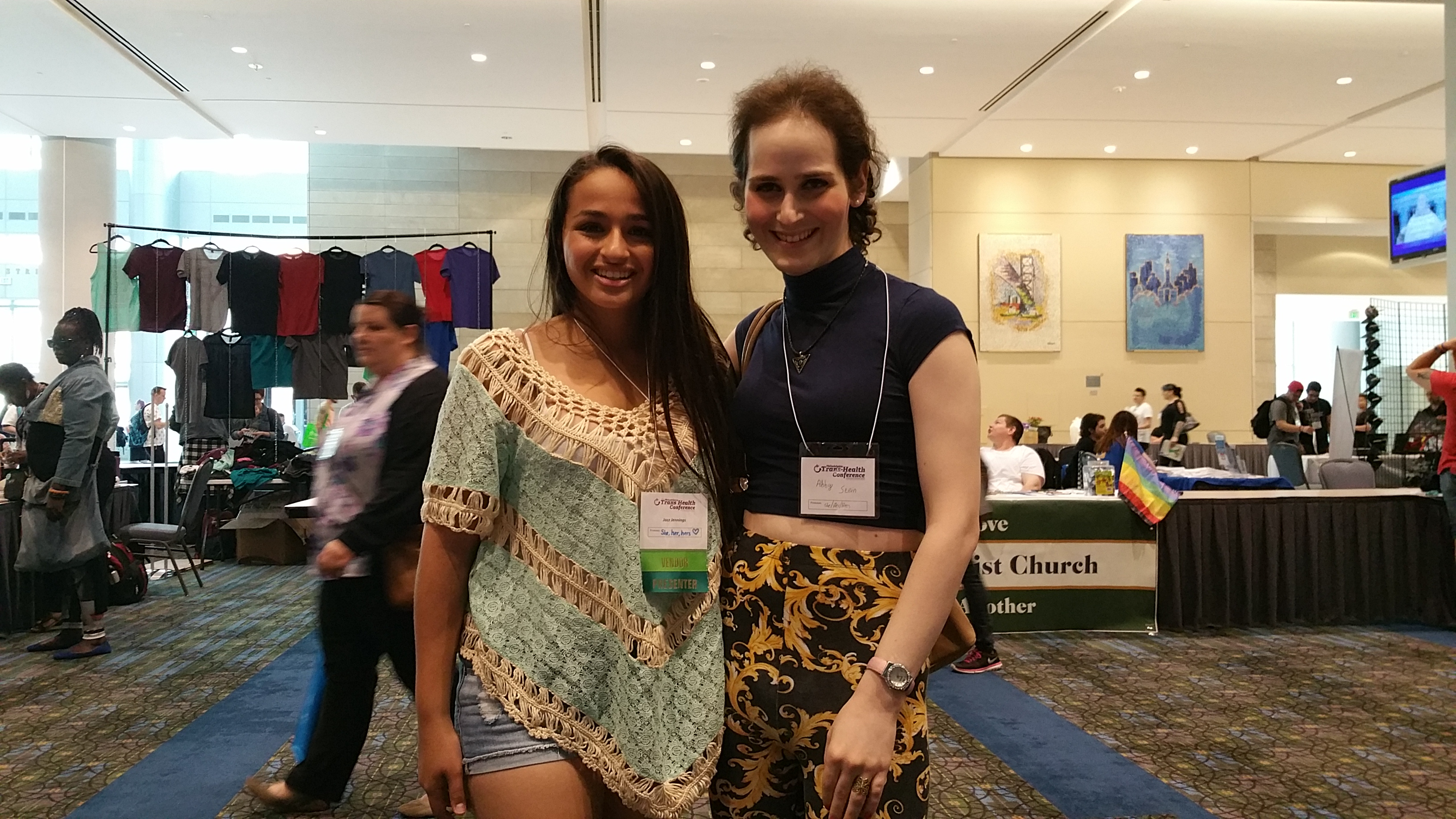
Stein with teenage trans activist, Jazz Jennings at the 2016 Philadelphia Trans Health Conference. They were both among those named "9 Jewish LGBTQ Activists You Should Know" by JTA and TOI.

- The Jewish Week 36 Under 36 - In 2016, she was named by The Jewish Week as one of the "36 Under 36" young Jews who changed the world. She is the first openly transgender person to receive the award.
- Footsteps Leadership Award - At the 2016 Footsteps Celebrates, she received a leadership award for outstanding leadership in advancing Footsteps stories in literature and voice."
- New York Magazine 50 Reasons to Love New York - In 2015, the New York Magazine counted her story as one of the 50 reasons to love New York, saying that New Yorkers are overly accepting of trans people.
- 9 Jewish LGBTQ Activists You Should Know - In June 2016, she was named by The Times of Israel and the Jewish Telegraphic Agency as one of the nine "most influential Jews who have helped make LGBTQ issues visible and are still working to enact change".
- Faith Leaders Leading the Fight for LGBTQ Equality - In October 2017, for LGBT History Month, she was named by the Human Rights Campaign, as one of 9 "faith leaders who are also leading the fight for LGBTQ equality".
- CAFE 100 - In April 2018, Stein was named by former US Attorney Preet Bharara, as part of the inaugural "CAFE 100 – extraordinary change-makers who are taking action to address some of the most pressing problems in America and around the world".
- LGBTQ Pride Award - During Pride month in June 2018, Stein was honored by Brooklyn Borough President Eric Adams as part of "a special group of LGBTQ New Yorkers", honoring her work within the LGBTQ, and especially the formerly Hasidic LGBTQ, community.
- 14 Jews Who Changed Queer History Forever - In June 2019, Stein was named by Alma as one of 14 "Jews who have changed queer history forever". Alongside Jazz Jennings, Rabbi Sandra Lawson, Leslie Feinberg, Magnus Hirschfeld, and others.
- 9 LGBTQ Faith Leaders to Watch in 2019 - In September 2019, Stein was named by the Center for American Progress as one of 9 LGBTQ faith leaders, whose "leadership in the current moment makes them critical faith leaders to watch in 2019 and beyond". According to a press release by CAP, "these extraordinary leaders have proposed powerful visions to reform the criminal justice system, advance climate justice, dismantle systemic racism, and more".
- Forward 50 - In December 2019, Stein was named by The Forward as one of the 50 American Jews "Who Influenced, Intrigued, And Inspired Us This Year". In it, Stein also described her commitment to lighting Shabbat candles.
- 10 Women You Need to Know This Women's History Month - In March 2020, for Women's History Month, Stein was named by Moment Magazine as one of 10 "powerful and inspiring women who work hard to create change and make an impact". Alongside Martha Nussbaum, Roberta Kaplan, Alice Shalvi, and Dr. Ruth.
- The World's Top 50 Thinkers - In July 2020, Stein was named by the Prospect Magazine as one of "The World's top 50 Thinkers in the COVID-19 Age". The list, which, according to Forbes, "is a much-anticipated exercise by the influential British magazine", called Stein a "renegade New York political science college student, and finally 27-year-old globally recognised author and advocate".
- Best Nonfiction Debut - In September 2020, Stein's book, Becoming Eve, was awarded the Best Non-Fiction Debut award, as part of Alma's "The Best Jewish Books of 5780" (AM). Saying that "not only is Abby a trailblazer and ridiculously inspiring — she's a really talented writer".
- 10 LGBTQ+ American Jews Who've Made History - During Pride Month 2021, Stein was named by Hillel International as one of "10 LGBTQ+ American Jews Who've Made History." Alongside Leslie Feinberg, Kate Bornstein, Lesley Gore, Rabbi Elliot Kukla, Michael Twitty, and others.
- The NCJW NY Rebekah Kohut Award - At the 2023 Fall Luncheon by the National Council of Jewish Women New York section, benefiting Jew for Repro, Stein received the Rebekah Kohut Award. As per the NCJW event invite, "the award is given to a New Yorker who has played an especially significant role in the communal life of our city."
- Woman of Distinction - In May 2024 Stein received the Woman of Distinction award from the New York State Senate, after being nominated by her State Senator Jabari Brisport representing New York's 25th Senate district.
- New York City Council Pride Honoree - During Pride Month 2025 Stein was honored by the New York City council "for her outstanding service and achievements" for the LGBTQIA+ community.
- American Jewish Press Association Rockower Award, First place Award for Excellence in Personality Profiles - In the 2019 awards, Simi Horowitz's profile of Stein, "Abby Stein: A Gender Transition Through a Jewish Lens", in the Moment Magazine Received the first place award for Excellence in Personality Profiles. The AJPA commented by saying that, "This piece captures the humanity of Abby Stein, with an abundance of quietly telling details (like what she's eating during the interview). An impressive work."

== Filmography ==
In addition to a long list of interviews with major national and international news networks, (Note: See the Media tab on her website.) Stein has also been featured in several TV segments in the United States, Canada, Israel, Bulgaria, and more – in English, French, Hebrew, Bulgarian, Russian, Spanish, and Yiddish.

Year	Title	Role
2014	Huffington Post Live	TV series; Episode: "Why Orthodox Jews Struggle to Leave Community" with Shulem Deen
2015	Huffington Post Live	TV series; Episode: "Why This Trans Woman Left Hasidism To Embrace Her Gender Identity"
2015	Chasing News	Fox TV Series; Episode: "Free To Be Me"
2016–2018	Great Big Story	A CNN Web Series; Episode: "Transitioning to Freedom" – in 2018 the episode was aired again by "Great Big Story Nordics" with Swedish subtitles; Episode: "Transsexuell med ultraortodox bakgrund"
2016	Dark Net	Showtime Television documentary series, Episode 8, "Revolt"
2016	Daily Vice – Canada	Canadian TV Series; Episode: "Les défis d'une activiste trans reniée par sa communauté juive hassidique" In French and in English
2017	NowThis Original	TV series; Episode: "How This Hasidic Rabbi Became A Trans Woman" – Got 2.6 million views on Facebook alone.
2017	Shishi With Ayala Hasson	Israeli TV Series on Channel 10; Episode: "הכל אודות אבי: מסעו המופלא של האברך החרדי שהפך לאישה" (All About Abby: The Wonderful Journey of the Young Ultra-Orthodox Man That Became A Woman), In Hebrew
2017	The Theme of NOVA	Bulgarian TV Show; Episode: "Темата на NOVA: Свещеникът, който се моли да бъде жена" (The Rabbi Who Prays to Be a Woman) – this was Stein's first TV appearance in Eastern Europe, and Bulgaria's first transgender story on TV, in Bulgarian.
2017	PopSugar	Social Media series; Episode: "This Transgender Trailblazer Left the Hasidic Community to Live Her Truth as a Woman" – it got over 7 million views on Facebook alone, the most of any of her videos
2017	DKISS	Spanish TV series; Episode: "Abby Stein cortó toda la relación con su familia cuando les contó que era transgénero" – Stein was not interviewed for this episode, in Spanish.
2017	Time Code – RTVi	International Russian-speaking TV series; Episode: "«Тайм-Код» с Владимиром Ленским. 16 июня" – Filmed at Columbia University, in Russian.
2017	FOX 5 News at 5	NYC TV news series; Episode: "Transgender woman's journey from Hasidim to a new life".
2017	A Plus: A Grain of Saul	Weekly Facebook based show; Episode: "To mark Transgender Day of Remembrance".
2017	The Rundown	TV show on the International Israeli channel i24NEWS; Episode: "Bridging Ultra-Orthodox and LGBT communities" in two parts, in English
2018	Todo Noticias	Argentinian TV show; Episode: "Cómo un rabino ultraortodoxo (casado y con un hijo) se convirtió en mujer," and additional segment "Abby, el rabino ortodoxo que se convirtió en mujer" in Spanish
2018	CAFE 100	Web Series; Episode: "Episode 2: Abby Stein"
2018	Huffpost Perspectives	TV series; Episode: S1:E11 "This Trans Woman Left Her Hasidic Community To Fully Embrace Her True Self"
2018	TRENDING	TV show hosted by Emily Frances; Episode: "From Ultra-Orthodox Rabbi to Transgender Woman"
2018	Stern	German Magazine based Series as part of JWD by Joko Winterscheidt; Episode: "Abby Stein musste eine Welt aufgeben, in der sie Rabbiner sein sollte – um eine Frau zu sein," In German
2019	112BK	Brooklyn based BRIC TV weekly show; Episode: "A Hasidic Rabbi's Transition"
2019	Queer Kid Stuff	Web series educating kids on LGBTQ+ and social justice topics; season 4, episode 2: "Religion with Abby Chava Stein!"
2019	Studio 10	Australian morning talk show on Network Ten; Episode: "Abby Stein: From Orthodox Rabbi To Transgender Woman"
2019	Today Show	American morning talk show on NBC; season 67, Episode: "Transgender Woman Chronicles Her Journey from Rabbi to Her True Self"
2020	Magellán	Hungarian Educational and Scientific show on Super TV2; Episode: "Rabbi volt, de nőként él tovább: Exkluzív interjú Abby Steinnel" (She was a rabbi, now she lives as a woman: An exclusive interview with Abby Stein), in Hungarian
2020	Soon By You	A credited and scripted cameo as a Yoga Instructor; Soon By You is a "frum and funky 'Friends'-esque sitcom", set in the Modern Orthodox community of New York City's Upper West Side. This S2:E2 episode was focused on the Orthodox LGBTQ community.
2020	Inside Edition	American TV News magazine on CBS; season 32, Episode: "Abby Stein Is the First from New York's Hasidic Community to Come Out as Trans"
2021	A Day in the Life of America	Documentary film produced by Jared Leto in 2017, aired by PBS as part of the Independent Lens series; season 21, episode 6.
2023	The Secret Life of Hasidic Jews in New York	Documentary produced by Drew Binsky exploring Williamsburg, NY, Abby's neighborhood where she grew up.
2025	The Encampments	Documentary produced by BreakThrough News and Watermelon Pictures about the 2024 Columbia University pro-ceasefire Encampments during which Stein, as part of Rabbis for Ceasefire, led Shabbat services. Her service leadership and remarks were included in the documentary.
2025	Girls & Gods	Documentary exploring "whether monotheistic religions can be feminist, with Ukrainian activist Inna Shevchenko of the FEMEN collective as their guide, from Copenhagen to New York." Premiered at CPH:DOX 2025.

== Personal life ==
In 2010, Stein married a woman, Fraidy Horowitz, with whom she also had her son, Duvid. The marriage was an arranged marriage by a matchmaker, and the couple only met for 15 minutes prior to the engagement. As Stein left the community, she divorced her wife. In an interview with The Wall Street Journal right after her divorce, she said that, "They had a good relationship", and that at the time of the divorce, she was able to "obtain a 'normal agreement', including weekly visits, joint custody, split holidays, joint decision-making on major life events, and every second weekend with her son".

Stein is a cousin of the actor Luzer Twersky.

In a 2023 piece Stein wrote for Autostraddle, she identified her sexuality "as an out and proud queer, poly demisexual."

== See also ==
- Transgender rights movement
- Trans woman
- LGBT culture in New York City
- List of LGBT people from New York City
- List of LGBT Jews
- NYC Pride March
- Transgender people and religion
- Transgender culture of New York City
