= My Unorthodox Life =

2021 reality web television miniseries

- Genre: Reality television
- Country of origin: United States
- Original language: English
- No. of seasons: 2
- No. of episodes: 18

Production
- Executive producers: Jeff Jenkins; Ross Weintraub; Reinout Oerlemans; Julia Haart
- Production companies: 3BMG; Jeff Jenkins Productions

Original release
- Network: Netflix
- Release: July 14, 2021 – December 2, 2022

My Unorthodox Life is an American reality television series by Netflix that premiered on July 14, 2021. The series centers on Julia Haart, the former CEO of a modeling agency and fashion company and a former ultra-Orthodox Jew, as Haart and her family acculturate to their new non-religious lifestyle in Manhattan. The second season premiered on December 2, 2022.

== Plot ==
The nine-episode first season of the web series documents Haart and her children's decision to leave the Haredi Jewish community in Monsey, New York, and pursue their passions for fashion and design. Haart claims that she had left Haredi Judaism over her discomfort with the community's strict religious observances and principles that she views as a form of "fundamentalism." Haart is depicted in the show as completing an autobiographical work recounting her personal journey. Haart's memoir is titled, Brazen: My Unorthodox Journey from Long Sleeves to Lingerie.

The show features Haart's four children, Batsheva, Shlomo, Miriam, and Aron; her second husband, Italian entrepreneur Silvio Scaglia Haart; and her best friend and chief operating officer of Elite Model World, Robert Brotherton.

== Episodes ==
=== Series overview ===
Season	Episodes	Originally released
1	9	July 14, 2021
2	9	December 2, 2022

=== Season 1 (2021) ===
No. overall	No. in season	Title	Original release date
1	1	"She Wears the Pants"	July 14, 2021
Meet Julia Haart and her family. The CEO shares her journey, Batsheva pushes to wear pants, and Miriam picks a look for her blind date with a girl.
2	2	"Becoming a Haart"	July 14, 2021
Will the runway show go off without a hitch? Miriam thinks about changing her name. A trip back to the old community brings back complicated memories.
3	3	"Memoir Meltdown"	July 14, 2021
Family matters: Batsheva resists a predictable parenting plan while Julia agonizes that her juicy memoir will upset her children and consults Miriam.
4	4	"Pursuing My Passion"	July 14, 2021
The sun's out, but a glum mood overshadows a getaway as the kids pore over the book. Bat speaks up for Ben, and Julia taps a matchmaker for Robert.
5	5	"Secular in the City"	July 14, 2021
Welcome to her world: A cry for help leads to an inspiring meeting. Julia throws a get-together, and Robert tosses insecurities and starts a search.
6	6	"I Haart Paris"	July 14, 2021
Paris Fashion Week collides with Sukkos. At a fairy-tale castle, Julia connects with her sister. What to wear? And who will sit in Chanel's front row?
7	7	"Camp Aron"	July 14, 2021
Adventure time: Miriam shows off a new date but fails to show up on time for Batsheva. Julia takes out her frum son Aron to open up his world.
8	8	"The Succession Plan"	July 14, 2021
Business calls, but Silvio chafes against "Z dates." The kids compete for an Elite spot in front of the tough CEO. Aron confides in his dad.
9	9	"Extending the Family"	July 14, 2021
Make the date: Ben smashes it — a bit too hard — when he takes Bat to a rage room. Yosef drops shattering news. Miriam sets Shlomo up with an admirer.

=== Season 2 (2022) ===
No. overall	No. in season	Title	Original release date
10	1	"Moving Out and Moving On"	December 2, 2022
Julia's marriage cracks apart, and she has to learn how to balance the divorce and her growing business. Robert learns how to live in his new body.
11	2	"Unpacked Feelings"	December 2, 2022
Miriam's girlfriend isn't ready to learn some things about her past. Batsheva wrestles with living alone. Silvio throws a giant wrench in Julia's life.
12	3	"Completely Blindsided"	December 2, 2022
A major shakeup at EWG leaves the whole team reeling, making Julia question her hard-fought independence. Everyone's there for her, except Batsheva.
13	4	"The Trouble With Aron"	December 2, 2022
Aron, who's become more religious, joins the family on a trip. Julia's concerned that he may be moving in a direction that will distance him from his family.
14	5	"The Way We Were"	December 2, 2022
Julia's divorce moves forward messily. She and Batsheva evaluate their relationship. Aron decides he doesn't want to go to college, to Julia's chagrin.
15	6	"The Haart Sphere"	December 2, 2022
Silvio now claims that Julia never actually co-owned their business. Nathalie's visa situation may force she and Miriam to make a big decision.
16	7	"Home is Where the Haart Is"	December 2, 2022
The family goes to Texas, and some of Julia's childhood memories reemerge. Robert and Miriam both have tough decisions to make about their futures.
17	8	"Ride or Die"	December 2, 2022
Robert has some hard conversations about his relationships. Miriam makes a big decision. Julia and Batsheva decide to dip back into the dating pool.
18	9	"Put a Ring on It"	December 2, 2022
Everyone's taking big steps in their lives: Julia in her advocacy, Batsheva with her career dreams, and Ra'ed and Robert in their relationship.

== Reception ==
=== Critical response ===
Response to the documentary has been mixed, with some praising Haart's verve and love of freedom, and others condemning her for her distortion of orthodox Jewish values. Joseph Berger, writing for the New York Times, notes Haart's claims that women are simply looked at as "baby-making machines" or "second class citizens," and discouraged from going to college, while in reality most girls who went to Haart's Beis Yakov are encouraged to attend college. Yet Haart defended her claims by saying that she had spoken with other women in the Jewish community and they agreed with her.

Writing for the Decider, Joel Keller recommends the show, writing that it is "going to ride on Julia Haart's personality, and this force of nature has personality to spare," but that he found some of it "more 'reality-real' than 'real-real'. Jenny Singer, in Glamour, called the series "wildly compelling", but wrote that while "Haart's anger at her upbringing is justifiable", Haart will "make life dangerous for Jewish people", by "making a reality show that depicts them as monsters". She further added that in her interaction with Orthodox women she doesn't see oppression, and that it may just be a matter of perspective. Irene Katz Connelly, in The Forward, writes that the show is "full of clothing choices, but those who don't choose correctly get chastised", and notes that the show "barely touches on the intriguing logistics of Haart's fashion world ascent". Judy Berman also panned the show, writing in Time that "it's hard to tell which parts of the show have been massaged into ads for Elite, Batsheva's career as an influencer, or Julia's forthcoming memoir". In J.: The Jewish News of Northern California, writer Esther D. Kustanowitz noted: "There's an interesting core story: Julia's goal to liberate and empower people in a way that she thinks allows them to be the most authentic and free versions of themselves... [Haart] wants others to experience freedom the way she defines it... While I can appreciate her embrace of a world she was denied, the imposition of her 'freedom' on others struck me as its own version of oppression." In The Jerusalem Post, Elliot Cohen writes that he "found that Ilhan Omar's infamous anti-Semitic quote, 'all about the Benjamins, baby', has been turned into an evening of Netflix and chill", and that "Netflix and Jeff Jenkins gave anti-Semites their greatest media gift since The Protocols of the Elders of Zion".

=== Response from Orthodox Jewish community ===
Articles published in Orthodox media outlets were heavily critical of the perceived anti-Orthodox premises of the show. Many women turned to social media to post pro-Orthodox stories using the hashtag #MyOrthodoxLife, and to express opposition to the show as distorting their position in the Orthodox community. Author Roberta Rosenthal Kwall wrote in Jewish Journal: "Most people outside of Orthodox communities do not understand that Orthodoxy in general is far from monolithic", and the show omits how "Orthodox women are often highly educated and professionally accomplished even in the world of Jewish law, long a male-dominated field". Writing a review in the Washington Jewish Week, writer Andy Gottlieb stated that the show is vapid, and the characters are narcissistic. Rabbi Yair Hoffman, writing in the Five Towns Jewish Times, said that the show is "spewing a vicious form of hatred designed to cast observant Jewry in a hideously negative light".

== See also ==
- Unorthodox (2020 miniseries)
- One of Us (2017 documentary)
- Leaving the Fold
- Let There Be Light
