= Off the derech =

Term for someone who has left an Orthodox Jewish community

Off the derech (Hebrew: דֶּרֶךְ, pronounced: /ˈdɛrɛx/, meaning: "path"; OTD) is a Yeshiva-English expression used to describe the state of a Jew who has left an Orthodox way of life or community, and whose new lifestyle is secular, non-Jewish, or of a non-Orthodox form of Judaism, as part of a contemporary social phenomenon tied to the digital, postmodern and post-postmodern eras. In its broadest sense, it can also include those changing to a milder form of Orthodoxy. Despite the term's pejorative and controversially dichotomic and definitive nature, it has become popular in use among Orthodox people, is found in mainstream literature, and has also been reclaimed by some OTD individuals.

Leaving Orthodox Judaism, especially the Haredi community, is largely reported to be a difficult experience emotionally, socially, and financially, often involving multiple risks and losses. The combined findings of a significant body of studies which have examined a wide and varied array of reasons given for leaving suggest that exiting is a complex, multifaceted phenomenon, its motivations of which can be defined in several ways: disaffiliation as immigration (aversion from and/or attraction to the differing living conditions of origin or destination, respectively), as apostasy (faith related), as liberation from a coercive group, and as standing for one’s identity. A common denominator between the narratives is an intensity in the individuals' desire to leave, underscored by their readiness to pay the high price involved.

Aggregations of ex-Orthodox individuals may comprise a social movement, though there is no organized effort to convince people to leave, making it more a social phenomenon than a movement. Reports show the rates of attrition from Orthodox Judaism in the US and the UK to be at 33%–52%, and US data appears to show a decline when comparing those born between c. 1990–2002 with those born before 1990. Similar trends in leaving religion exist in Islam, the LDS movement, Hinduism, Pentecostal Christianity, Roman Catholicism, and evangelical Christianity.

The OTD phenomenon is of interest to Orthodox Jews, non-Orthodox Jews, members of the general public, and exiters themselves. This interest has generated many narratives expressed in the form of memoirs, podcasts, studies, documentaries, TV, and opinion pieces. While initial memoirs and documentaries of exiters focused on those leaving Hasidic communities, experiences of individuals from other Orthodox communities (Modern Orthodox, Yeshivish, Haredi, etc.) differ in several significant ways.

== Background ==
=== Terminology ===
Derech, Hebrew for “path” or “way”, bears a religious connotation: those who follow the derech ascribe to both ancient and modern rabbinic authority which determines a way of life, both communal and private. In Orthodox Judaism, halakha (Jewish law) is viewed as the ultimate authority on how to lead a good and morally upstanding life, and living by its code demonstrates one's commitment and is necessary for belonging within certain communities. The term "off the derech" originated within Haredi communities to describe a physical move away from family and peers as well as abandonment of religious, ethical, and cultural principles. With the high level of existential importance for the individual and the community as a whole to stay on the derech, the term in its original setting is one of disapproval, even when not translated into active shunning of the individual.

Some exiters reject the term because of its history and meaning within Orthodox communities, and some reject it as giving credence to perceived religious superiority or a false binary of being either on or off the prescribed path with no room for any deviation. But many exiters reclaim it and use it as convenient shorthand or as a defiant phrase, celebrating its subversive meaning as an antidote to the stigmatization it connotes. Alternatives used are XO, signifying "ex-Orthodox" while also playing on a term for "love"; ex-Jew, found in blogs; ex-Hasidic or ex-Haredi, offering a more specific indication of one’s native community; and Apikores, derived from the Greek philosopher Epicurus. The last term, first invoked in rabbinic Mishnaic literature and often used as a slur by community members, has extended in meaning to loosely include anyone who expresses a view regarded not only as heretical but even as heterodox.

"Off the derech" has become the most commonly used term among Jews of current or previous Orthodox affiliation to describe an act of departure from a Jewish religious lifestyle, and it is also increasingly used within mainstream parlance, blogging, journalism, and scholarship to identify a brand of secularism born out of a lived experience within a rigidly Orthodox home and community.

In Modern Hebrew, the process of halting or decreasing religious observance is known as yetziah besheelah. This term, loosely translated as "leaving in question," plays on "returning in repentance", the popular term for those who move in the other direction by becoming Orthodox after being raised without Orthodoxy.

=== History of religious attrition ===
Movement away from traditional religious practices and communities toward secularity has a rich tradition in modern Jewish and Jewish American literature, much of which is echoed in the OTD phenomenon. The Haskalah, the Jewish Enlightenment in Europe that ran parallel in time to the European Enlightenment, was similarly a determined move toward secularization that challenged rabbinic authority, though on a greater scale. Comparable to the OTD phenomenon in the Digital Age, the Haskalah arose in an era of unprecedented opportunities for participation in the non-Jewish world and access to diverse bodies of knowledge. In 19th-century Europe, more girls than accounted for may have voluntarily left Orthodox Judaism, since many stories of girls being abducted by convents may actually have been voluntary defection. Early 20th-century American Jewish immigrant stories consistently tell of an initial departure from a native community, usually located in Eastern Europe or Russia, followed by a secondary departure from their religious and cultural practices.

Nevertheless, OTD literature distinguishes itself as "a movement that originates in the Postmodern world and moves toward, if anything, one that is Post-postmodern," bringing with it its own unique sociological and anthropological aspects.

== Demographics ==
=== United States ===
A 2013 survey on American Jews conducted by the Pew Research Center, which included more than 500 Orthodox participants, found that 52% of Jewish adults who were raised Orthodox were no longer Orthodox. When subdivided by age, it found that 17% of these are accounted for by those under the age of 30, 43% by those aged 30–49, 59% by those aged 50–64, and 78% by those aged 65 and above. Some experts think that the higher attrition rate in the older age groups is possibly "a period effect in which people who came of age during the 1950s, 1960s and 1970s left Orthodoxy in large numbers."

A subsequent 2020 study found the attrition rate to be at 33%. This lower rate may be due (at least in part) to the fact that in this study, the sample of adults who were raised as Orthodox Jews includes a larger percentage of people under the age of 30.

=== United Kingdom ===
The JPR's preliminary report from the 2013 National Jewish Community Survey showed that 36% of participants who were raised Central Orthodox were no longer Orthodox (an additional 6% had gone "right" to Haredi Orthodoxy). There was no data available to demonstrate shifts in the British Haredi community.

== Reasons for leaving ==
Lived experience is different in various sections of Orthodox Judaism, which includes Modern Orthodoxy, Haredism, Yeshivish Orthodoxy (which can denote Haredi and/or Modern Orthodox communities), Hasidism, and more. Experiences also differ based on gender. Despite these differences, however, the broad outlines of reasons people leave any Orthodox Jewish community remain similar. Reasons include sexual abuse, forbidden sexual orientations or gender, lack of belief / belief in other theories, patriarchal society, or dislike of the culture. Often, if the leaver does not feel welcome in the community, they will leave altogether instead of finding other communities, although some go to other forms of Judaism, such as Reform. One study by Roni Berger found four milestones common in the narratives of study participants: 1) initial questioning; 2) growing doubts; 3) beginning to share selectively with a small group of trusted others; 4) revealing a new and altered identity. This process of religious disaffiliation is echoed by Helen Rose Fuchs Ebaugh in a 1988 article about former nuns, which she outlines as 1) first doubts; 2) seeking and weighing role alternatives; 3) a turning point; 4) establishing an ex-role identity.

Lynn Davidman's 2014 book acknowledges the often messy process of leaving, including a period of "passing" when individuals move between two worlds. This period is characterized by confusion, doubts, depression, and defiance, but also by self-confidence and courage to leave the regimented world they grew up in and begin to live in another world. In addition, because of the community's insularity, some people who experience the first stages of doubt, confusion, and depression don't see a way out and instead reconcile themselves to remaining. Those who are married and/or have children often make choices about suppressing doubts or negotiating acceptable trespasses with their spouses in order not to jeopardize their spouse and children's standing in the community.

An individual's decision to discontinue practicing Orthodox Judaism is likely based on the presence of one or more of three key causes: emotional, intellectual, or implementational issues. Nishma Research carried out a survey of OTD individuals in 2016, which recorded a widely-varied and complex set of reasons people give for leaving, and the process in which they do so, including emotional, intellectual, or implementational issues. An earlier study by journalist Faranak Margolese came to the conclusion that: "Most formerly observant Jews today seem to have left, not because the outside world pulled them in, but, rather, because the observant one pushed them out. They experienced Judaism as a source of pain…so they did what was natural: go in the other direction." These and other studies point to social and emotional aspects of Haredi Judaism, especially individuals' feelings of being silenced, marginalized, or ignored within the rigid social structure, as important factors in individuals' decisions to leave.

Some selected reasons revealed by these studies include bad behavior and perceived hypocrisy in the community, especially from community leaders; oppressive community norms; experiencing religious observance as a condition for parents' or teachers' love or approval; experiencing molestation, rape, or other sexual abuse; difficulty reconciling strict interpretations of Torah and Talmud with knowledge of natural science; and disbelief that the Torah or Jewish path is correct.

Sexual abuse is indeed found to be reported among OTD individuals at a much higher rate than among the overall Orthodox and general population. According to a 2018 study, formerly Orthodox people are more than four times as likely to report childhood sexual abuse compared to currently Orthodox people and those never affiliated with Orthodox Judaism. A 2019 study on OTD adults reports that 25% of male respondents and 30% of female respondents said that they had experienced sexual abuse within Orthodox Jewish communities, though the questioning was not specific enough to determine the prevalence of sexual abuse in minors.

== Orthodox views of OTD people ==
Like experiences of those leaving Orthodox Judaism, attitudes of those who remain differ across the many sections of Orthodox Judaism. Attrition from Orthodoxy is seen by the family and the Orthodox community at large as a serious problem for Jews as it threatens the Orthodox population of Jews, causes assimilation, and breaks the intergenerational chain of the Orthodox traditions and laws for living. In a 2023 survey, "people going off the derech" was collectively ranked by Haredi respondents as the third to fourth "top communal priority for the next decade"; Modern Orthodox respondents placed it as priority number twelve.

Attitudes of Orthodox individuals and leaders toward those who have left range from considering them heretics to be shunned and/or mourned as dead (the latter having fallen out of vogue more recently), to regarding them as being wayward people in pain who must be shown love. Showing love to those perceived as being in pain is most often seen in regard to teens, where the attitude is that if "a parent goes down the path of love and acceptance - that child will be far less likely to go down that rabbit hole. And may even return to observance." In the view of Haredi leadership and Haredi psychologists, questions of faith are a symptom of abuse, depression, anxiety, addiction or life problems, and through addressing these issues one is likely to return to their former beliefs. For this reason, individuals who lose faith are often pathologized for their inability or unwillingness to conform. "At risk," a term used in secular arenas to describe minors "less likely to transition successfully into adulthood" due to a variety of social and emotional factors, was adapted by Orthodox people to include those at "spiritual risk," defined as a decline in observance, a decline in spiritual beliefs, and/or violation of socio-cultural norms and rules, elements which can manifest into leaving Orthodox Judaism.

Many former Haredim speak of having been ostracized by their families, although it is also not uncommon for families to retain close ties with such children. A 2021 study focusing on OTD individuals raised in Yeshivish (Lithuanian Haredi) communities concludes that "In the Yeshivish world it appears that [the family] remaining close, not cutting off a child because they are OTD, is a pattern and not an exception." In a Mishpacha interview, Shimon Schneebalg, a Hasidic Rabbi in Israel, encouraged parents of OTD children to fully accept that their child has taken "a different path" and to love their child unconditionally. In 2018, in what the Jerusalem Post termed a "remarkable" video, Rabbi Gershon Eidelstein was filmed saying that parents of an OTD son should not reprimand their child for bringing a girlfriend into the home or lighting a cigarette on shabbos.

Agudath Israel of America, a leading ultra-Orthodox organization, regularly addresses the topic of individuals leaving Orthodox Judaism. At their national conventions in 2015 and 2016, they addressed the topic in panels titled "Chanoch La’naar: Nurturing Our Children, Ensuring Our Future," "OTD: Why Do They Leave? And What Can We Do About It?" and "Diving Off The Derech: The Emerging Adult At Risk Phenomenon." The topic also appears frequently in their now-defunct magazine, The Jewish Observer, like the January/February 2006 issue devoted to the topic of "Kids@Risk Revisited."

For those who leave and are married with children, the community tends to embrace the spouse left behind and help raise funds for legal support to help that person retain custody of the children, sometimes accomplished through community emergency fundraising appeals which are backed by the Haredi community leadership. One such event in 2016 in Stamford Hill, London was graced by the presence of senior rebbes who had flown in from Israel to attend, which helped to attract a reported 1,500 strong attendance, each of whom was asked for a minimum donation of £500. A flyer for the event contained a letter from Rabbi Ephraim Padwa, spiritual head of the UOHC, in which he wrote: "To our great pain, and our misfortune, our community finds itself in a terrible situation – 17 of our pure and holy children where one of the parents, God rescue them, have gone out into an evil culture, and want to drag their children after them."

Orthodox leaders and parents have set up organizations to counsel those whose relatives are OTD. Some of the organizations include Project Yes and MASK (Mothers and Fathers Aligned Saving Kids). Additionally, Shabbatons, groups, and events are organized to support parents dealing with an OTD child. Rabbis and leaders also provide support and advice for children whose parents have left Orthodoxy.

Haredi community members interviewed by the BBC "argue[d] that the stories of people who leave cast the community - a vulnerable minority at risk of anti-semitic attack - in a bad light and that it’s unfair." A hashtag trend #MyOrthodoxLife followed the release of the 2021 reality TV show My Unorthodox Life, and similar campaigns often arise when OTD narratives are in the spotlight in attempts to center Orthodox stories joy and silence ex-Orthodox stories of pain or dissatisfaction.

Comedian Leah Forster shared custody of her daughter with her ultra-Orthodox husband and continued observing the Jewish sabbath, keeping a kosher home and fasting on Yom Kippur after their divorce. Her off-Broadway show “That’s Yentatainment!” told Forster’s journey from closeted Haredi teacher to openly lesbian comedian, influencer and author.

== Post-disaffiliation issues ==
Multiple hardships and losses are involved in one's process of disaffiliation from Orthodox Jewish communities, especially from Haredi Orthodoxy, which can include loss of family, loss of employment, divorce, loss of custody of children, and loss of community and social structure. Additionally, those who leave must adjust and acculturate to new ways of life and thinking outside of their communities of origin.

=== Psychological ===
Individuals who leave ultra-Orthodox Judaism often face rejection from friends and family members. This knowledge often leads individuals who have doubts to first try to reconcile their doubts, in order to avoid the risk of losing family and friends. These individuals are generally pathologized by community leaders and experts and this attitude can often cause them to doubt their own sanity for having questions. At this stage, individuals often experience anxiety and depression. Some contemplate, attempt, or commit suicide. Media coverage of Faigy Mayer's 2015 suicide led to a spate of think-pieces about OTD suicides. Mental health advocates within the Orthodox and OTD communities have raised concerns about suicide and overdose rates in both. However, reliable statistics are not available as the matter has not been formally researched. Leaving any faith-based community often has traumatic effects; for many, losing a lifelong sense of reliance and security through believing in divine providence can be a difficult adjustment. OTD individuals also struggle with ingrained ideas about God's punishment, often leading to extreme feelings of guilt. Guilt among questioning individuals sometimes leads them to commit self-harm as a way of punishing themselves for perceived wrongs towards God, family and community.

While psychological effects can be overwhelming in the initial years after leaving, the majority of OTD individuals report success in attaining their desired objectives in leaving. In Engelman's 2019 survey, 59% reported that they accomplished the goals they expected by leaving; 30% reported that they somewhat accomplished those goals; and 11% reported that they did not accomplish those goals.

=== Social ===
Leaving the community entails adjusting to a secular world where attitudes to many subjects are different and social life works differently. Some find it hard to adapt to aspects of the general public's day to day lifestyle, which can leave them with feelings of inadequacy and alienation. Leaving a close-knit community where every member of the community is taken care of is often financially challenging as well. Individuals who leave ultra-Orthodox communities often have difficulty maintaining contact with families who may disapprove of their choices. To counteract the feelings of isolation and alienation, many individuals form groups of friends who get together for Shabbat dinners and other practices with cultural significance.

Some Orthodox Jews remain in the community despite losing their faith. In the 2016 Nishma survey of OTD individuals, 33% of the respondents reported that they were posing as religious. These people are sometimes referred to as Reverse Marranos, double-lifers, in the closet OTD, or Orthoprax Jews. The decision to stay is often influenced by fear of being ostracized and having to rebuild community, or by fear of losing one's spouse and/or children. Many of these individuals join online communities of people of OTD experience, often using pseudonyms to avoid being outed. 39% of double-lifers say it is likely they will leave their community at some point.

Some OTD individuals have become activists by founding, or volunteering within, organizations which advocate for specific changes within the community. Some examples include ZAAKAH, which works to prevent child sexual abuse; YAFFED, which advocates for basic secular education among ultra-Orthodox Jews especially amid Hasidim; and JQY, which focuses on LGBTQ+ causes.

== Ex-Orthodox organizations ==
Many formerly Orthodox individuals seek community and discussion about their former beliefs and new lives in online and in-person groups. A number of OTD organizations have emerged; Footsteps, founded in New York in December 2003, provides educational, vocational, and social support to people who have left or want to leave a Haredi or Hasidic community in the United States. Hillel is its equivalent in Israel, Besht Yeshiva Dresden in Germany, Pathways Melbourne in Australia and Mavar and Gesher in the UK. Freidom, a non-profit in the US, provides social support and cultural guidance via programs and events. Project Makom was founded in July 2014 by the nonprofit Jew in the City, and "helps former and questioning Charedi Jews find their place in Orthodoxy". Informal communities have also developed on websites, blogs, and Facebook groups.

== In popular culture ==
In the first few decades of the twenty-first century, a number of stories of people leaving Orthodox Judaism have gained a degree of fame in the general public's eye. Fictional and autobiographical narratives existed in smaller numbers in the twentieth century.

Notes:

- The genre of "OTD literature" is much debated among ex-Orthodox individuals and scholars who study the phenomenon, with some who consider writings of the haskalah to be part of this corpus and some who define the genre as belonging to a particular historical moment beginning in the twentieth century.
- The books, films, and others listed below are varied in their approaches to and portrayals of both Orthodox communities and exiters of those communities.
- Several of these texts which received rave reviews in some publications, primarily the Netflix miniseries Unorthodox and the Netflix reality show My Unorthodox Life, have also generated spirited debate about stereotypical portrayals of Orthodox communities and alleged inaccurate sensationalized representations of those who leave. Some reviews highlight the real-life negative and sometimes dangerous effects of certain representations, and some embrace the ambivalence of having representation even if imperfect. According to Shira Schwartz, a greater number of representations of Haredim are shown in popular media even if there may be equal numbers of non-Haredi OTD experiences, possibly as a strategy to attract secular interest through the shock and intrigue in the narratives of visibly-different people shedding religious attire.

Title	Format / Genre	Author / Creator	Year of Publication	Description
The Jazz Singer	movie	Alan Crosland	1927	Famous for being the first film with synchronized dialogue, this classic talkie stars Al Jolson as Jakie Rabinowitz, the son of a cantor who defies the traditions of his Orthodox parents because of his desire to pursue a career as a jazz singer. Following punishment by his father, Jakie runs away from home, but many years later his professional success comes into direct conflict with his religious and family responsibilities. The film was remade twice — in 1952 (directed by Michael Curtiz) and again in 1980 (directed by Richard Fleischer and Sidney J. Furie), the latter starring Neil Diamond and Lawrence Olivier.
The Chosen	novel	Chaim Potok	1967	Novel about the friendship between two Jewish Brooklyn boys, Danny and Reuven, who are from different backgrounds. Danny is a Hasidic Jew and the son of a rabbi, but feels trapped by the restrictions imposed on him. By the end of the film he has abandoned Hasidism, choosing instead to go to college to become a psychologist. Reuven is Modern Orthodox, the son of a talmudic scholar and an ardent Zionist. Tradition, parental expectation, the Holocaust and the establishment of Israel are causes of friction between them.
The Chosen	movie	Jeremy Kagan	1981	Adaptation of Potok's novel.
A Price Above Rubies	movie	Boaz Yakin	1998	Sonia is a Haredi wife and mother living in Boro Park, Brooklyn. She decides to leave the problems and confines of her marriage and family, including her baby. Sonia eventually moves out of Boro Park and finds work and love outside of the Haredi community. Starring Renée Zellweger, Christopher Eccleston, Julianna Margulies, Allen Payne.
The Romance Reader	novel	Pearl Abraham	1995	Hemmed in by the strict codes of her Orthodox Jewish upbringing, the daughter of a rabbi escapes to the world of romance novels and begins to chafe at her family and her faith.
Mendy: A Question of Faith	movie	Adam Vardy	2003	This lesser-known but touching movie stars ex-Hasidic actors who play characters leaving their Hasidic community in New York for a life of sex and drugs, but also, eventually, love.
Disobedience	novel	Naomi Alderman	2006	Novel follows a rabbi's bisexual daughter as she returns from New York to her Orthodox Jewish community in Hendon, London.
Let There Be Light	documentary	Meni Philip	2007	Documents the life of Meni Philip, who was a famous Haredi singer, that became secular along with four of his brothers and sisters.
Sinner	Short film	Meni Philip	2009	A 28-minute film about a young boy studying at an ultra-Orthodox Jewish boarding school who is sexually abused by his rabbi and struggles with guilt and silence. The film premiered at the 2009 Venice International Film Festival, where it won the Best European Short Film award.
Holy Rollers	movie	Kevin Asch, Antonio Macia	2010	In Brooklyn, a youth from an Orthodox Jewish community is lured into becoming an Ecstasy dealer by his pal who has ties to an Israeli drug cartel. Stars Jesse Eisenberg, Justin Bartha, Danny A. Abeckaser.
Unorthodox: The Scandalous Rejection of My Hasidic Roots	memoir	Deborah Feldman	2012	Memoir documenting Deborah Feldman's life in an ultra-religious Jewish community in Brooklyn, New York.
Felix & Meira	movie	Maxime Giroux	2014	Affair between two Montreal residents - one a married woman from a devoutly Jewish family and community, and the other a single French Canadian man with his own family issues. Starring Martin Dubreuil, Hadas Yaron, and Luzer Twersky.
All Who Go Do Not Return	memoir	Shulem Deen	2015	Memoir about growing up in and then leaving one of the most insular Hasidic sects in the U.S.
Exodus	memoir	Deborah Feldman	2015	Sequel to Unorthodox; follows Feldman as she raises her son in the “real” world, findes solace and solitude in a writing career, searches for love, and travels across Europe to retrace her grandmother’s life during the Holocaust.
Cut Me Loose: Sin and Salvation After My Ultra-Orthodox Girlhood	memoir	Jericho Vincent	2015	A memoir about Vincent's journey from self-destruction to redemption, after cutting ties with her ultra-Orthodox Jewish family.
Uncovered: How I Left Hasidic Life and Finally Came Home	memoir	Leah Lax	2015	Leah Lax tells her story—beginning as a young teen who left her liberal, secular home for life as a Hasidic Jew and ending as a forty-something woman who has to abandon the only world she's known for thirty years in order to achieve personal freedom.
Disobedience	movie	Rachel Weisz, Ed Guiney, and Frida Torresblanco	2017	Adaptation of Alderman's 2006 novel; the story of a woman who returns to the strict Orthodox Jewish community for her father's funeral after living in New York for many years, having been estranged from her father and ostracized by the community for a reason that becomes clearer as the story unfolds. The film stars Rachel Weisz, Rachel McAdams, and Alessandro Nivola.
One of Us	documentary	Heidi Ewing and Rachel Grady	2017	The film follows the lives of three ex-members of Brooklyn's Hasidic community: Ari Hershkowitz, Luzer Twersky, and Etty Ausch. Each struggles with being ostracized from their former community and families, while revealing how they came to leave. The film also reveals their experience with religious doubt, as well as with both domestic abuse and childhood sexual abuse. Some receive support from ex-Haredi organizations such as Footsteps, while others work to find a footing in the secular world. The film also follows counselor Chani Getter in her work with helping former ultra-Orthodox individuals settle into the outside world.
The Book of Separation	memoir	Tova Mirvis	2017	Memoir about leaving Orthodox Judaism to find out what she really believes.
High Maintenance: “Derech”	TV episode	Ben Sinclair, Katja Blichfeld	2018	An ex-Hasid named Baruch (Luzer Twersky), with the accidental help of a flighty Vice writer (Ismenia Mendes), has a wild night out at a club.
Unorthodox	Netflix miniseries	Anna Winger and Alexa Karolinski, and directed by Maria Schrader	2020	Esty, a 19-year-old Jewish woman, is living unhappily in an arranged marriage among the Satmar sect of the ultra-Orthodox community in Williamsburg, Brooklyn, New York City. She runs away to Berlin, where her estranged mother lives, and tries to navigate a secular life, discovering life outside her community and rejecting all of the beliefs she grew up with. Her husband, who learns that she is pregnant, travels to Berlin with his cousin, by order of their rabbi, to try to find her.
My Unorthodox Life	reality TV	Jeff Jenkins, Ross Weintraub, Reinout Oerlemans, Julia Haart	2021	The series centers on Julia Haart, the CEO of a modeling agency and fashion company and a former ultra-Orthodox Jew, as Haart and her family acculturate to their new non-religious lifestyle in Manhattan.
Ultraorthodox mein Weg	memoir	Akiva Weingarten	2022	Memoir documenting Akiva Weingarten's life in an ultra-religious Jewish community in Monsey, New York.
Heretic in the House	podcast	Naomi Seidman	2022	In this limited four-part series, Professor Naomi Seidman takes us on a deeply moving journey with believers and heretics alike to uncover their hidden stories.
Rough Diamonds	Netflix series	Rotem Shamir, Yuval Yefet	2023	Noah Wolfson (Kevin Janssens) travels home to Antwerp after the suicide of his younger brother, Yanki. Upon his return, Noah reconnects with the Haredi community he abandoned when he left the Orthodox faith, while also trying to rescue his family's diamond trading business from the pressures of organized crime and a zealous local prosecutor (Els Dottermans).
Shttl	movie	Ady Walter	2023	In 1941, Mendele (Moshe Lobel) returns to his shtetl in Western Ukraine one day before the Nazi invasion.
An Unorthodox Education	documentary	Joe Kolman	2023	Interviews with academics and leavers to address the problems in ultra-Orthodox education, particularly Hasidic boys schools.
“That’s Yentatainment!”	Off-Broadway show	Leah Forster	2024	Forster tells her journey from closeted Haredi teacher to openly lesbian comedian, influencer and author with shared custody of her daughter and continued Sabbath and kashrut observance.
No Child Spared	Documentary film	Meni Philip	2025	Investigates physical abuse in ultra-Orthodox Jewish schools, following children who endured extreme corporal punishment, and the broader systemic issues within these communities.

== See also ==
- Apostasy in Judaism
- Baal teshuva, a Jew raised in a non-observant family who becomes observant as an adult
- Criticism of Judaism
- Deradicalization
- Epikoros
- Ex-Mormon
- Ex-Muslims
- Exvangelical
- Footsteps (organization)
- Heresy in Judaism
- Humanistic Judaism
- Jewish atheism
- Jewish secularism
- Jewish skeptics
- List of Jewish atheists and agnostics
- Psychology of religion
- Religious disaffiliation
- Scrupulosity
- Spiritual crisis
