= David Bashevkin =

American rabbi and professor

Rabbi David Bashevkin

Personal life
- Born: February 15, 1985 (age 41)
- Education: Yeshivas Ner Yisroel, Rabbi Isaac Elchanan Theological Seminary, The New School (Milano School of International Affairs, Management, and Urban Policy)
- Occupation: Rabbi, adjunct professor, writer, podcast host

Religious life
- Religion: Judaism
- Denomination: Modern Orthodox

Jewish leader
- Position: Director of Education
- Organization: NCSY
- Residence: Teaneck, New Jersey

David Bashevkin (or Dovid Bashevkin, born February 15, 1985) is an American rabbi, writer, adjunct professor, and podcast host. He serves as Director of Education at NCSY, an Orthodox Union youth group.

== Early life and education ==
Bashevkin grew up in Lawrence, Nassau County, New York, to parents from traditional Jewish backgrounds. He described his oncologist father and writer mother as being right-wing Modern Orthodox. As a child, he wrote letters to the editor of Wizard, a comic book industry magazine. After graduating from Davis Renov Stahler Yeshiva High School for Boys, Bashevkin studied at Israel's Yeshivat Sha'alvim, later attending Ner Israel Rabbinical College in Baltimore, Maryland, where he earned his bachelor's degree in Talmudic Studies in 2006. After receiving his rabbinic ordination from the Rabbi Isaac Elchanan Theological Seminary at Yeshiva University (YU), Bashevkin graduated with a master's degree in Polish Hasidut in 2010 from YU's Bernard Revel Graduate School of Jewish Studies, having studied with Yaakov Elman. From 2013 to 2022, he studied for a Ph.D. in Public Policy and Management at the New School's Milano School of International Affairs, Management, and Urban Policy, where he focused on crisis management.

== Career ==
=== NCSY ===
Bashevkin began his academic career as an associate director of education at NCSY, the youth division of the Orthodox Union, from 2010 to 2013 before becoming the group's director of education. As the leader of NCSY, he has directed many youth seminars and programs and has also developed curricula for staff and teens.

=== Academia ===
Bashevkin served as an adjunct professor at Long Island University from 2010 to 2011. He currently teaches courses on public policy, religious crisis, and rabbinic thought at YU in the Isaac Breuer College of Hebraic Studies as well as the Sy Syms School of Business.

=== Podcasts ===
Bashevkin developed a Tablet Daf Yomi podcast called Take One with Liel Leibovitz. In 2020, Bashevkin launched the 18Forty podcast to explore traditional Jewish topics in a contemporary context. The podcasts are organized by monthly topics, with each topic featuring 2–4 guests. Past topics havenincluded Biblical criticism, the "off the derech" phenomenon, and Jewish mysticism, and guests interviewed have included Marc B. Shapiro, Joshua Berman, Shulem Deen, Kelsey Osgood, Ammiel Hirsch, Jonathan Greenblatt, and Gil Student. 18Forty grew beyond its podcast origins and now considers itself a media company that is "a modern virtual beit midrash—a vibrant forum where questions are embraced, curiosity is nurtured, and Jewish life is enriched."

== Publications ==
=== Books ===
Bashevkin believes in the study of Jewish thought as a mechanism to find spiritual fulfillment through Torah study and everyday activities. His published books in this genre include the Hebrew work ברגז רחם תזכור - B'Rogez Rahem Tizkor, Sin•a•gogue: Sin and Failure in Jewish Thoughts, and Top 5: Lists of Jewish Character and Characters. He authored the NCSY Haggadah entitled Just One. Many of Bashevkin's ideas draw extensively on the works of Zadok HaKohen Rabinowitz, a 19th-century Hasidic rabbi, especially the latter's thoughts on sin.

Bashevkin has written humorously about Orthodox Jewish culture, which he referred to as "airplane food and not home-baked." One humor column in Mishpacha magazine cataloged the idiosyncrasies and nuances of Jewish life. Bashevkin has written extensively on Jewish theology, publishing articles on sin, failure, and Jewish doctrine and tradition, including the application of Jewish scripture in the 21st-century digital age.

=== Selected articles ===
- Thoughts and Prayers Do Help, Wall Street Journal (June 1, 2022).
- #MeToo Should Include #SinToo, Wall Street Journal (October 3, 2019).
- Failure Comes To Yeshivah, Jewish Action (Spring 2019): 62–64.
- Rabbi’s Son Syndrome: Religious Struggle in a World of Religious Ideals, Jewish Action (Summer 2017): 38–44.
- Medium Matters: The Medium and Message of Torah in the Digital Age, Shavuot-To-Go (2016): 6–9.
- A Radical Theology and a Traditional Community: On the Contemporary Application of Izbica–Lublin Hasidut in the Jewish Community, TorahMusings.com (August 2015): 54–68.
- The Forgotten Talmud: On Teaching Aggadah in High Schools, Jewish Action (Fall 2015).
- Life is Full of Failure: Bio Blurbs Should Be Too, First Things (May 8, 2014).
- The Custom to Recite the Priestly Blessings After Birkat ha-Torah, ha-Maor 68:1 (2015): 86-90 (in Hebrew).
- The Pew Report’s Lesser-Known Cousin: The Phew Report, Jewish Action (Summer 2014).
- The Jewish Community Confronts Its Crisis Crisis, Jewish Action (Summer 2013).
- Perpetual Prophecy: An Intellectual Tribute to Reb Zadok ha-Kohen of Lublin on his 110th Yahrzeit, Seforim (August 19, 2010).
- Jonah and the Varieties of Religious Motivation, Lehrhaus (October 9, 2016).

== Personal life ==
Bashevkin is a resident of Teaneck, New Jersey.
