= Faigy Mayer =

American entrepreneur

- Education: Brooklyn College
- Occupations: Entrepreneur and software engineer

Faigy Mayer was an American entrepreneur and software engineer. She was the founder, CEO, and iOS developer of Appton, an app development company. She was also a member of Footsteps, a group which provides social and emotional support to former members of Hasidic Judaism.

== Early life ==
The daughter of Israel and Chava Mayer, Faigy Mayer attained her undergraduate degree from Touro College. She left the Hasidic Belz community in Brooklyn's Borough Park in 2010, when she was 24 years old. She matriculated to Johns Hopkins University, earning a graduation degree in 2015, and later received a master's degree in accounting and computer science at the City University of New York-Brooklyn College.

== Career ==
As an iOS developer, Mayer had created many iOS apps, including New York restaurant tip calculator, NYCTips, and a parking app called Carma.

== Death ==
On July 20, 2015, Mayer died by suicide by jumping off from a 20th floor rooftop bar known as 230 Fifth in Manhattan’s Flatiron District. Her death led to a spate of think-pieces about the issue of suicide amongst former members of the Hasidic Jewish community.
