= Shulem =

Shulem is a masculine given name which may refer to:

- Shulem Deen (born 1974), American author, essayist, former Skver Hasid, and critic of Hasidic Judaism
- Shulem Lemmer (born 1989), American Belz Hasidic singer
- Shulem Moskovitz (1877–1958), Romanian hasidic rabbi
