= Yaakov Elman =

American professor of Talmud

Prof. Yaakov Elman

Personal life
- Born: August 30, 1943
- Died: July 29, 2018 (aged 74)

Religious life
- Religion: Judaism
- Denomination: Orthodox Judaism
- Position: Professor of Judaic studies at the Bernard Revel Graduate School
- Organization: Yeshiva University
- Residence: Brooklyn, New York

Yaakov Elman (1943 – July 29, 2018) was an American professor of Talmud at Yeshiva University's Bernard Revel Graduate School of Jewish Studies where he held the Herbert S. and Naomi Denenberg Chair in Talmudic Studies. He was the founder of the field now known as Irano-Talmudica, which seeks to understand the Babylonian Talmud in its Middle-Persian context.

== Education ==
Elman received his MA in Assyriology from Columbia University and his PhD in Talmud from New York University.

== Publications ==
Authored:

- Authority and Tradition: Toseftan Baraitot in Talmudic Babylonia
- The Living Nach: The Early Prophets, The Later Prophets
- Reading the Hebrew Bible: Two Millennia of Jewish Biblical Commentary

Edited:

- Transmitting Jewish Traditions: Orality, Textuality, and Cultural Diffusion (Studies in Jewish Culture and Society)
- Dream Interpretation from Classical Jewish Sources
- Immortality, Resurrection and the Age of the Universe: A Kabbalistic View
- Why Jews Do What They Do: The History of Jewish Customs Throughout the Cycle of the Jewish Year
- Hazon Nahum: Studies in Jewish Law, Thought, and History

== Research interests ==
His research interests centered around Talmud and rabbinic literature of nearly all periods and genres, including rabbinic theology, unfolding systems of rabbinic legal exegesis, and the cultural context of classical rabbinic texts. He researched the relation of the Babylonian Jewish community of Talmudic times to the surrounding Middle Persian culture and religions.

== Notable students ==
- David Bashevkin
- Shai Secunda, Neusner Professor in the History and Theology of Judaism at Bard College
