= Leaving the Fold =

2000 documentary film directed by Eric R. Scott

Leaving the Fold is a 2008 documentary film on the lives of young men and women who left the Hasidic world of their youth. The young people featured in the film live in Canada, America, and Israel. The film was directed by Canadian filmmaker, Eric R. Scott, and featured in the film is Basya Schechter, a New York–based singer-songwriter. Shechter's music features throughout the film.

== Overview ==
The film's run time is 52 minutes. Four of the film's interviewees are from the Chabad-Lubavitch Hasidic community. The film was first shown at the Montreal World Film Festival, and subsequently on Canadian, Australian, Belgian, and Finnish television.

== See also ==
- One of Us (2017 film)
- Let There Be Light (2007 film)
- Chabad in film and television
- Off the derech
