= Freidom =

American non-profit organization

- Formation: 2012; 14 years ago
- Founder: Gene Steinberg
- Legal status: Nonprofit
- Purpose: Social support and cultural guidance for people who have left Haredi Jewish communities
- Headquarters: New York City
- Region served: United States and Canada
- Members: 1,300
- Website: https://freidom.org/
- Formerly called: OTD Meetup

Freidom, originally OTD Meetup, is a non-profit organization based in New York City that hosts social and cultural events for former Haredi Jews in a dozen cities throughout the US and Canada.

== History and Mission ==
Freidom was founded as OTD Meetup by Gene Steinberg, himself a former Satmar Hasidic Jew raised in Kiryas Joel, NY, inspired by the suicide of his close friend and former Haredi Rachel Nove in 2010, to create a supportive environment for people of such background during their transition into mainstream society, which can be isolating, and to introduce them to new cultural experiences. In 2012, the first events were Shabbos meals and gatherings. Steinberg changed the name in 2019 to Freidom – Frei being the Yiddish word for free – to reflect its members' choice to free themselves from the idea that there is only one path to follow.

== Activities ==
Freidom holds almost 200 events annually in twelve United States and Canadian cities. These include outings to museums, the theater, sporting events, movies, and restaurants, as well as gatherings and virtual meetups. In 2019, Freidom launched its annual "Freifest" festival, which was attended in its first year by around 95 people.

== Membership ==
In 2019, Freidom had a reported membership of 1,300. During the COVID-19 pandemic, the organization saw a significant rise in membership and a 50% increase in participation in events, a result of a wave of religious laxity and disaffiliation caused by various aspects of the pandemic.

== Allegations ==
In September 2023, New York based ex-Hasidic support organization Footsteps sent a letter via email to its members stating it had cut ties with Freidom and would no longer promote their events, due to allegations by Footsteps members of lack of safety at Freidom events. Freidom responded in a statement that it could not address the allegations due to the vagueness of the statement.

== See also ==
- Off the derech
- Footsteps (organization)
