= Julia Haart =

American fashion designer (born 1971)

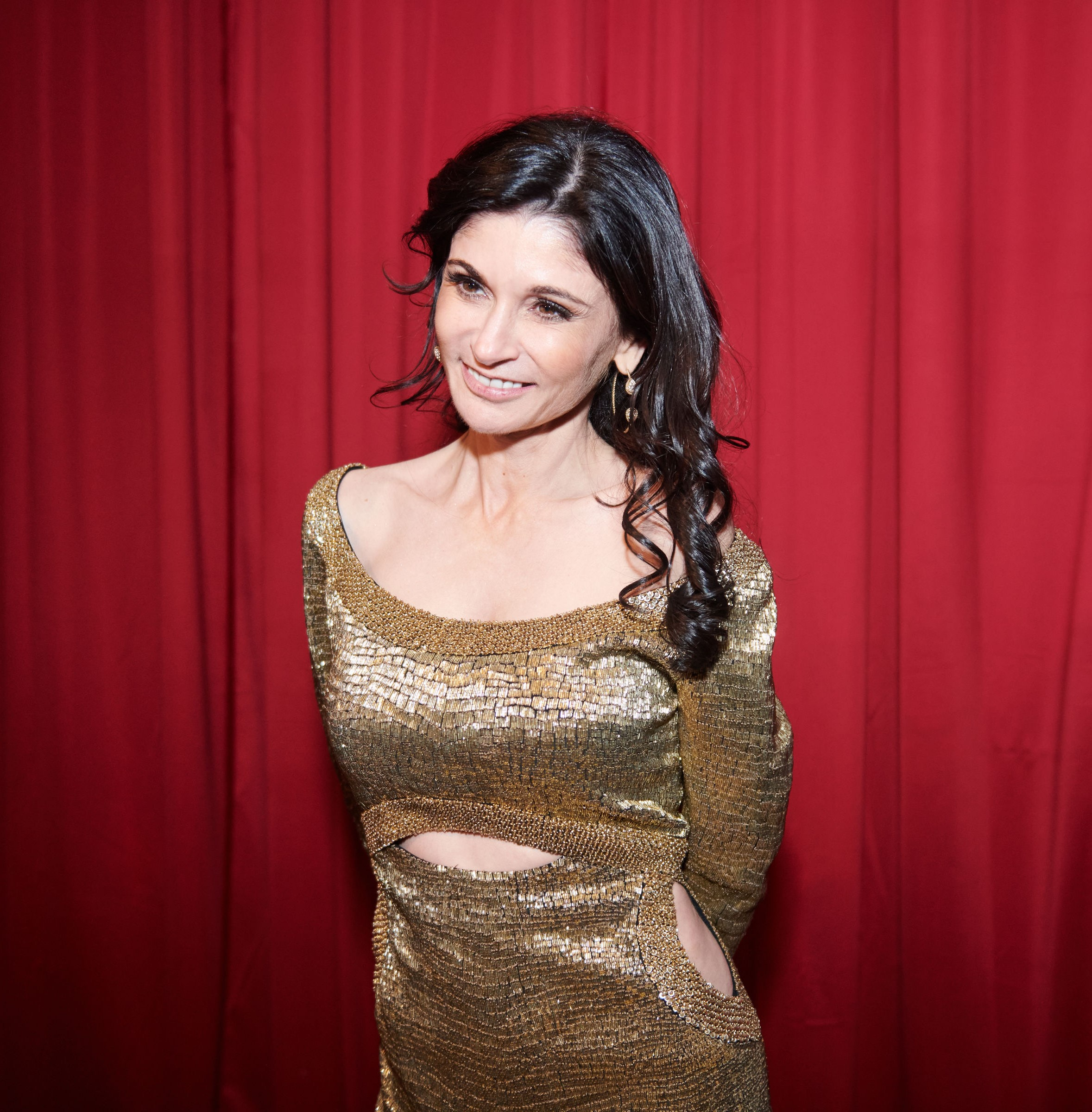
- Born: Julia Leibov; April 11, 1971 (age 55); Moscow, Soviet Union (now Russia)
- Years active: 2013–present
- Labels: La Perla; Elite World
- Spouses: Yosef Hendler (divorced) Silvio Scaglia (m. 2019; div. 2025)

Julia Haart (born April 11, 1971), previously known as Yulia Leibov, Julia Leibov, Talia Leibov, and Talia Hendler, is an American fashion designer, entrepreneur, and author. She is the founder of Body by Julia, a body-positive, technologically advanced shapewear brand. Haart is the co-owner of Freedom Holding (formerly Pacific Global Management Group), a holding company that controls the Elite World Group. She previously owned a namesake shoe collection, and was creative director at the Italian luxury house La Perla.

Haart is the subject and executive producer of the Netflix miniseries My Unorthodox Life, which described her 2013 decision to leave her Haredi community. Haart serves on the Emerge America Creative Coalition, the ERA Coalition Advisory Board and the Association for Foreign Press Correspondents USA Board of Directors.

== Biography ==
=== Early life ===
Haart was born in Moscow in 1971. She and her parents left Russia when she was 3, and moved to Austin, United States. In Austin, she attended the Wilford School, at which she was the private school's only Jewish student. Her parents gradually became more observant, under the tutelage of a Chabad rabbi. Eventually, her parents decided to move to an area with a large Haredi community. When Haart was in fourth grade, her family moved to Monsey, United States.

Initially, Haart attended the Adolph Schreiber Hebrew Academy of Rockland, a Modern Orthodox day school in New City, United States. But Haart and her family's level of observance had been considerably higher than that of Haart's peers. Haart's parents decided to send her to a Haredi school with stricter observance. In the seventh grade, Haart transferred to Yeshiva of Spring Valley, a Bais Yaakov school in Monsey, United States.

Haart completed high school studies at Bais Yaakov Monsey in Monsey, New York, at which she served as a student leader. After graduation, Haart attended seminary for one year at Beth Jacob Jerusalem. There, Haart earned a teaching certificate, which qualified her to teach both secular and religious subjects in Orthodox Jewish schools within the Haredi community. Haart began her teaching career immediately upon graduation from the seminary.

=== Marriage and family life ===
In the Haredi girls' schools, the primary focus had been on teaching religious observance, as well as on preparing to be godly wives and mothers. Haart had hoped to marry a rabbi, then to raise an observant family. During her school years, Haart had been called Julia, the Anglicized form of her Russian name Yulia. When she was 18, she changed her first name, "to the more Hebrew-sounding Talia, in order to attract a match". Haart's family began searching for a suitable match, with the help of a shadchan, upon Haart's graduation from seminary.

At 19, Haart married her first husband, Yosef Hendler, a yeshiva student who was five years her senior. Yosef was himself a ba'al teshuva, who became religious while studying at the Wharton School in United States. At the time of their marriage, Hendler had been a kollel student at Yeshiva Rabbi Chaim Berlin. The two began their married life together in Brooklyn; thereafter, the family moved to Monsey.

Financial constraints necessitated that Yosef leave the kollel and work in the secular world. Yosef started working as a trading assistant at Lehman Brothers in New York City. Then Yosef took a job at Southern Energy, due to which the Hendler family moved to Atlanta. Some years later, the Hendlers moved to Monsey. The Hendler children were sent to Haredi schools in the Monsey area.

=== School teaching ===
After graduating from the seminary, Haart taught English and/or Judaic Studies at several Orthodox Jewish schools: Yeshiva Atlanta in Atlanta; Yeshivat Shaare Torah in Brooklyn; Bnos Leah Prospect Park Yeshiva in Brooklyn; Yeshiva of Spring Valley in Monsey; the Adolph Schreiber Hebrew Academy of Rockland in New City; and Bais Rochel in Monsey.

Throughout the 1990s and early 2000s, Haart worked as a Judaic Studies teacher at Yeshiva Atlanta; "staff who knew her at the time – when she went by the name Talia Hendler – recalled that she was beloved by students and known for her sharp style".

=== Leaving the Haredi community ===
Right from the start, there was friction in the Hendlers' marriage.

While living as a Haredi Jew throughout the 1990s and early 2000s, Haart became increasingly uncomfortable with her community. The treatment of her younger daughter, Miriam, bothered her in particular. In a 2021 interview with The New York Times, she said that her daughter "just wouldn't conform. They were doing to her what they had done to me — trying to push her down and mold her into that flat person that they could disappear. I couldn't let that happen."

After leaving the community, she took on the name Julia Haart. The last name Haart is derived from her maiden name, Leibov, which is similar to Lev, Hebrew for "heart". Thereafter, Haart entered the fashion industry, with the help of investors and business partners.

== Business ==
=== Insurance sales ===
For years, Haart secretly sold life insurance. The money from these secret sales provided for her the means with which to leave the Haredi community, and to establish a new life for herself in the secular world.

=== Julia Haart Shoes for Women ===
After leaving the Haredi community in 2013, Haart founded a shoe company, Julia Haart, with the goal to make shoes that were both fashionable and comfortable. She partnered with a ski boot engineer and a German company that creates a gel used by NASA to create a comfortable high-heeled shoe.

=== La Perla ===
In 2016, Haart collaborated with La Perla for their Spring and Fall 2016 accessory collections. The same year, she was named as the creative director for the brand.

Following her appointment as Creative Director of La Perla, Haart launched a new approach to ready-to-wear for the company. At La Perla, Haart created the first stretch Leavers lace, and launched a collection of ready-to-wear lingerie with built-in support. For her Fall/Winter 2017 fashion show, Haart constructed a "La Perla Manor" runway show, in which Naomi Campbell, Lindsey Wixson, Sasha Pivovarova and Kendall Jenner walked.

Haart is known for her 2017 Met Gala dress designed for Kendall Jenner. The gown consisted of 85,000 crystals affixed to a single string.

=== Elite World Group ===
In March 2019, she became chief executive officer and chief creative officer of the talent media conglomerate Elite World Group (EWG). Under Haart's leadership EWG has re-focused the brand and added new divisions. Elite World Group prioritizes assisting models to monetise their brands and business projects.

Additionally, Haart is the creative director of e1972, a luxury fashion brand launched by Elite World. The collection received a lot of positive media attention, and was celebrated for its "innovation, inclusivity, and inspiring message of empowerment".

=== Body by Julia ===
In 2023, Haart launched +Body by Julia Haart, an American shapewear and clothing brand. +Body focuses on body positivity and inclusivity across the brand and practices inclusive sizing. The shapewear was designed to be worn visibly with color-infused fabric technology. The line tackles common issues, fusing materials together to avoid white and seam lines. +Body by Julia Haart was voted as The Very Best Shapewear by The Strategist.

== Activism ==
Julia Haart is a prominent advocate for women's rights, democracy, and social justice, using her public platform to highlight the challenges faced by marginalized communities worldwide. Her activism focuses particularly on supporting women living under oppressive regimes and promoting democratic values.

=== Ukraine ===
Julia Haart has been deeply involved in providing humanitarian support to Ukraine during its ongoing war with Russia. Haart received an award from the 109th Territorial Defense Brigade as gratitude for “a significant contribution to the development and support of the Ukrainian army, territorial integrity and inviolability of Ukraine”.

In December 2022, Haart partnered with the Volunteer Ambulance Corps and Ukraine Friends to personally deliver medical supplies to Bakhmut Ukraine. Her initiative brought ambulances, medicine, medical supplies and toys to the refugees and soldiers. Her efforts helped to draw international attention to the conditions in Ukraine. Haart partnered with actor Liev Schreiber in organizing charity events that successfully raised over one million hryvnias to support Ukrainian children affected by the war. These funds were used to provide critical resources, including medical supplies and educational support for children displaced by the conflict.

=== Combating antisemitism ===
Haart has been a strong advocate in the fight against antisemitism. In 2024, she launched Ahm Nation, a website to support social media advocates, helping them combat rising online antisemitism and providing resources for fighting hate speech. In 2023, Haart visited Israel to show solidarity after the October 7 attacks, where she met with communities affected by the violence. Haart accompanied an active IDF unit into Gaza, and interviewed both President Herzog and PM Netanyahu. Haart condemned anti-Israel protesters, and is using her platform to combat misinformation surrounding the Israeli conflict. In one 2024 rally, Haart spoke about her personal experiences as a Jewish woman and expressed her pride in her heritage, stating that she has “never been prouder to be a Jew”. At this event, she emphasized the importance of unity within the Jewish community and vowed to continue advocating against antisemitism, not only in the U.S. but across the globe.

=== Women in Iran ===
In the wake of widespread protests against the Iranian regime, particularly following the death of Mahsa Amini in police custody, Haart has used her platform to amplify the voices of Iranian women fighting for their rights. Haart led a protest in Washington, speaking out against the Iranian government’s treatment of women. During these protests, Haart spoke about the systematic oppression faced by women in Iran, including restrictions on dress, education, and freedom of speech. Haart, along with Kate Rigg, Heidi Sieck, Nicole Ansari, Shaunna Thomas, Marlene McCarty, Antoinette Cooper, Miriam Haart, BETTY, A'shanti F. Gholar, and Jen Aks organized cultural and art events such as the Paint2Power public art-making initiative, which raised awareness about the plight of Iranian women through creative expression. Haart participated in fundraising events, such as the SheHer fundraiser, aimed at raising awareness for Iranian women fighting for their freedom.

== Awards and Recognitions ==
=== CHI È CHI Award (2021) ===
Haart received the CHI È CHI Award in recognition of her contributions to female empowerment and for being a source of inspiration to women.

=== 21 Leaders for the 21st Century (2022) ===
In June 2022, Haart was named one of the "21 Leaders for the 21st Century," honoring her as one of the pioneering individuals advancing gender equality.

=== Icon Award for Impact and Innovation (2023) ===
Julia Haart was honored with this award during London Fashion Week in 2023. The award recognized her influence in both fashion and humanitarian efforts.

=== 109th Territorial Defense Brigade Award (2023) ===
Haart was recognized by the 109th Territorial Defense Brigade of Ukraine for her contributions to the Ukrainian army and efforts to support the country's territorial integrity.

=== WIN Woman Leadership Award (2024) ===
Haart was awarded the WIN Woman Leadership Award at the WIN (Women in Negotiation) Summit, acknowledging her leadership and advocacy for women.

== Legal battles ==
After Haart told Scaglia she was divorcing him in 2022, he fired her from Elite World Group. Haart sued Scaglia in Delaware's Chancery Court. Haart stated that as an equal owner of EWG, she could not be dismissed. On August 4, 2022, Vice Chancellor Morgan T. Zurn of the Delaware Chancery Court issued a ruling that although Julia owns 49.99% of the company, Silvio Scaglia is the controlling shareholder.

In February 2023, Julia Haart filed a fraud lawsuit against Silvio Scaglia, Paolo Barbieri, Jeffrey Feinman, and the accounting firm, DDK & Company. Haart alleged that Scaglia and his co-conspirators misrepresented her ownership in the company, and induced her to continue working as CEO of EWG without a salary or contract. The lawsuit was initially dismissed by the court, but Haart appealed the decision.

In October 2024, the New York Appellate Division granted Haart the appeal and reinstated Haart’s claims in her lawsuit against Silvio Scaglia, Jeffrey Feinman, and the accounting firm, DDK & Company. The court found that Haart’s reliance on Scaglia’s statements about owning 50% of Freedom Holding Inc. (FHI) was reasonable due to their fiduciary relationship as family members and co-owners.

Additionally, the court reinstated claims against Jeffrey Feinman, noting that it was reasonable for Haart to rely on his representation as an accountant. Claims of fraudulent concealment related to FHI’s preferred stock were also reinstated, with the court affirming Scaglia’s duty to disclose due to their fiduciary relationship. Furthermore, the claim that Feinman and DDK aided and abetted Scaglia’s fraud was reinstated, with the court finding that the preparation of key documents, including tax returns, constituted substantial assistance.

In June 2024, an arrest warrant was issued for Scaglia after he was found in contempt of court for failing to comply with a court order requiring him to pay $300,000 in legal fees to Haart. As a result, the court sentenced him to 20 days in jail.

By September 2024, Scaglia’s financial situation became a point of contention in the ongoing litigation. Scaglia requested a court-appointed attorney, citing financial hardship. However, Haart's legal team raised questions about his financial claims, pointing to reports of Scaglia's spending on yachts and private jets during the summer.

In January 2025, the honorable Judge Pearlman awarded Haart 50% of EWG, Freedom Holding and a 65 million dollar penthouse in New York City. Additionally the judge granted Haart power of attorney over Scaglia's interest in all of the companies thereby putting Haart in full control of all assets.

== Storytelling ==
=== My Unorthodox Life ===
Haart is the subject of the Netflix series My Unorthodox Life, which premiered in July 2021. The documentary series follows the professional and personal life of Haart in her role as chief executive officer of Elite World Group, as well as an author, mother and wife. The show has been received critically by many Jewish community members.

In 2022, the Jewish Journal named Haart one of "The Top 10 Jewish Reality TV Stars of All Time."

=== Brazen ===
In April 2022, Haart released her memoir, entitled Brazen: My Unorthodox Journey from Long Sleeves to Lingerie, published by Penguin Random House. The book details Haart's life story from an ultra-religious housewife to shoe designer, to CEO of the modeling agency, Elite World Group. The memoir was released in audiobook format simultaneously narrated by Julia Haart herself. Brazen received praise from critics. Soon after its release, the book became a Wall Street Journal, USA Today, and Sunday Times Bestseller.

== Personal life ==
Haart is the eldest of eight children, one of whom died in a car accident at the age of 5. Only one of her siblings, a sister named Hannah, has a relationship with her; her parents and other siblings stopped talking to her after she left her Orthodox Jewish community.

In June 2019, Haart married Silvio Scaglia. Haart and Scaglia divorced in 2025.

=== Children ===
Haart has four children with her first husband, Yosef Hendler: Batsheva, Shlomo, Miriam, and Aron. When Haart left the Haredi community, Batsheva and Shlomo were adults, whereas Miriam and Aron were minors. Haart stayed in hotels and traveled worldwide, then periodically visited the family in Monsey. Then Haart settled in Manhattan, at which time the children would split their time between Manhattan and Monsey. Then Julia went off-the-derech, whilst Yosef adopted a Modern Orthodox worldview. Thereafter, the younger Hendler children were sent to Modern Orthodox schools. It was decided that the Hendler children should attend schools with good secular education, so as to open the door to employment, trade school, or higher education.

While the Hendler family had been observant Haredim, the elder Hendler children were educated at Haredi schools. Batsheva is an alumna of a Bais Yaakov school in the Monsey area. At the time, girls were discouraged from studying at university. Upon graduation, Batsheva attended trade school. Batsheva studied at The Center for Culinary Arts and the Capri School of Hair Design, then entered the world of work. Haart, upon leaving the community, encouraged Batsheva and her husband Binyamin to go to school.

Miriam is an alumna of Ma'ayanot Yeshiva High School for Girls. Aron is an alumnus of Yeshivat Noam and The Frisch School.

Three of Haart's children have university degrees:

- Batsheva graduated from the Fashion Institute of Technology with an AAS in Accessories Design;
- Shlomo studied at the Honors Program at Rockland Community College, then graduated from Columbia University with a BA in Political Science and Government; and
- Miriam graduated from Stanford University with a BSc in Computer Science.

Aron had wanted, not to pursue secular education, but to study at yeshiva, in order to become a Haredi rabbi.

Batsheva was married to Binyamin "Ben" Weinstein, a Modern Orthodox Jew from a Haredi background, from 2012 until their divorce in November 2021. Batsheva has left the religious lifestyle, whereas Binyamin has remained religious. Binyamin studied at Yeshiva Ohr Gedolah, and earned a BTL in Talmudic Law. Thereafter, Binyamin entered the workforce in the secular world.

Batsheva and Shlomo adopted the surname Haart for their stage names. Miriam legally changed her surname from Hendler to Haart. Aron retained the surname Hendler.
