= Mendy: A Question of Faith =

2003 American film

Mendy
- Directed by: Adam Vardy
- Release date: September 20, 2003
- Running time: 90 minutes
- Country: United States

Mendy: A Question of Faith is a 2003 film about a Hasidic Jewish man who leaves his religiously devout community in Brooklyn to experience secular life in New York City. The film was written and directed by Adam Vardy.

The film's protagonist is a Hasidic man named Mendy (Ivan Sandomire) whose metamorphosis from a devotee of an insular faith to the secular world is contrasted with the life of Bianca (Gabriela Dias), a Brazilian exotic dancer.

Vardy's film was inspired by a 1997 Village Voice article about young Hasidic men from the Satmar community who left Hasidic Judaism to immerse themselves in modern, secular life.

== See also ==
- One of Us (2017)
