= Faranak Margolese =

American-Israeli writer (born 1972)

- פאראנאק מרגוליס
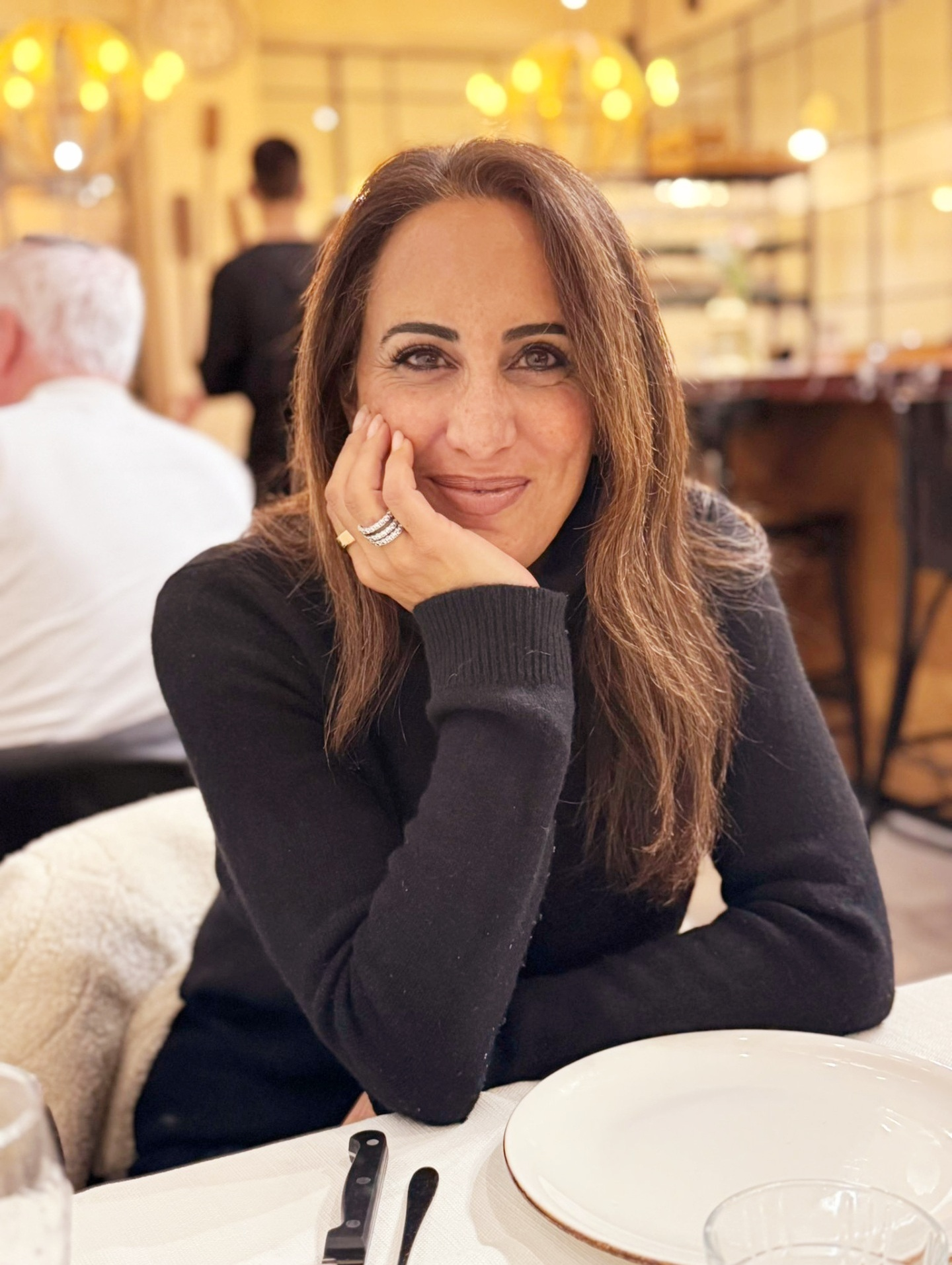
- Margolese in 2025
- Born: Faranak Rofeh; 1972 (age 53–54); Manchester, England
- Education: Columbia University; Stern College
- Occupation: Author
- Writing career
- Notable work: Off the Derech
- Website: offthederech.com

Faranak Margolese (Hebrew: פאראנאק מרגוליס; born 1972) is an American-Israeli writer, best known as the author of Off the Derech, a book about contemporary assimilation in the Orthodox Jewish world.

== Early life and education ==
Margolese was born in Manchester, England, in 1972, the great-granddaughter of the former Chief Rabbi of Tehran, Iran. She was raised in Los Angeles, California, to Persian immigrant parents in a traditional Sephardi Jewish household. She graduated from Yeshiva University High School of Los Angeles, received a BA in philosophy from Stern College and a Master of Fine Arts in nonfiction creative writing from Columbia University in New York.

== Career ==
From 1995 to 1997, she was an adjunct professor teaching expository writing at Yeshiva University and Queens College.

== Off the Derech ==
=== Origin ===
Margolese conceived of the idea for Off the Derech: Why Observant Jews Stop Practicing Judaism; How to Respond to the Challenge while living in New York City and noticing that some of her friends who had grown up in Orthodox households were no longer observant. She spent five years doing research, conducting interviews, and setting up an online survey with people who had left their Orthodox way of life. She also interviewed rabbis, educators, therapists, and program directors.

=== Summary ===
Off the Derech (A Jewish term that means "off the path") explores the phenomenon of Jews raised in Orthodox households who choose to leave that lifestyle as adults, examining their reasons for doing so and offering preventative measures for the Jewish community to take. Margolese writes that "there is no greater challenge facing the Jewish world today".

=== Praise ===
Off the Derech has been called "a ground-breaking book", with Margolese earning praise for "authoring the first seminal work on contemporary assimilation from the ranks of the previously observant". Her writing style has been called "extremely lucid and logical". Rabbi Abraham Twerski endorsed Off the Derech as "mandatory reading for every rabbi, teacher, and parent". Publishers Weekly wrote that Margolese's conclusion ("God cannot be confined to the narrow path we walk... neither can his people") "will resonate with those of all faiths".

== The Outliers ==
About a decade after publishing Off the Derech, Margolese published a revised version in Hebrew, called "HaYotziim" (The Outliers – Why Religious People Leave Religion and How to Deal with the Challenge). HaYotziim is based on a new study, focused on the israeli society in which Margolese interviewed rabbis, academics, psychologists, educators and people who left the religious fold in Israel to better understand if there are any differences between the religious Jewish communities outside of Israel and those in Israel proper regarding the phenomenon of leaving orthodox observance.

== Other work ==
Margolese served as Editor of the 1999 edition of Freedom in the World. The comprehensive annual report by Freedom House monitors political rights and civil liberties in nations and disputed territories across the globe. She has also worked as a contributing editor to the Los Angeles Jewish Times, and columnist for The Jerusalem Post.

== Bibliography ==
=== As author ===
- Off the Derech: Why Observant Jews Stop Practicing Judaism; How to Respond to the Challenge, Israel: Devora Publishing Company, 2005.ISBN 1932687432, 978-1932687439
- היוצאים – מדוע דתיים עוזבים את הדת וכיצד להתמודד עם האתגר (The Outliers – Why Religious People Leave Religion and How to Deal with the Challenge). Israel: Sella Meir, 2017.

=== As editor ===
- Freedom in the World: The Annual Survey of Political Rights and Civil Liberties, 1998–99, New York: Freedom House, 1999.

== Personal life ==
She immigrated to Israel in 2002 with her husband David Margolese.
