= Mavar =

Charity supporting people leaving ultra-Orthodox Judaism

- Legal status: Non-profit organization
- Purpose: Support for people leaving Haredi Jewish communities in the UK
- Location: London
- Website: http://mavar.org.uk

Mavar is a UK-registered charitable organisation providing professional support to people who have left or want to leave the Haredi Jewish community. It provides financial, educational, legal, and emotional support enabling people to find new communities and support networks after Haredi Judaism.

== Mission ==
According to the Mavar's website, the organisation offers information, one-to-one support, online resources, and referrals to appropriate agencies and organisations, including lawyers or therapists. Mavar also assigns a personal mentor to guide through the issues such as education, employment, welfare, housing, and legal rights. Mavar is described as a "confidential service that helps people from the Haredi community explore new paths in life", which includes LGBT support. Mavar does not campaign or proselytize, and exists to support personal choice.

== Structure ==
Mavar is based around a model established by the New York charity Footsteps. Its services are run by volunteers. It is free of charge, relying on private donations, and is strictly confidential.

Mavar translates from Hebrew as "crossings", and to maintain discretion, it meets people asking for help in quiet, but public, places away from the Haredi community such as a library. Typically, Mavar begins by helping to access English lessons, as many leaving the community cannot write or speak English. Mavar will also help access housing and benefits, according to individual need. Mavar may also be able to link to a host family in some circumstances.

== See also ==
- Ex-Haredim
- Faith to Faithless
- Off the derech
- Footsteps, a US-based organisation with a similar mission to support ex-Haredim.
- Nahamu - a British think-tank campaigning on issues of religious extremism in the Haredi community
