= Footsteps (organization) =

American non-profit organization

- Formation: December 2003
- Founders: Malkie Schwartz
- Legal status: not-for-profit organization
- Purpose: support for people leaving the U.S. Haredi Jewish community
- Headquarters: New York City
- Website: www.footstepsorg.org

Footsteps is a not-for-profit organization based in New York City that provides educational, vocational, and social support to people who have left or want to leave a Haredi or Hasidic Jewish community in the United States.

== Mission ==
Footsteps is an organization that offers educational, vocational, professional, social, and legal support to individuals transitioning from ultra-Orthodox communities into mainstream society. According to its website, many people from the Haredi and Hasidic communities who make this shift often feel like "cultural immigrants," experiencing disorientation and isolation, alongside a lack of practical and marketable skills. Founded in December 2003, Footsteps provides resources to help those navigating this transition. Those who leave these communities often refer to themselves as "off the derech" (OTD), a term originally used dismissively by members of the ultra-Orthodox communities but now embraced by individuals reclaiming their journey of self-determination.

== History ==
Footsteps was founded in December 2003, by Malkie Schwartz, a former Chabad Hasid from Crown Heights, while enrolled as a student at Hunter College in New York City. According to Schwartz, 20 people showed up to the first meeting, announced on flyers around the Hunter campus and through word of mouth. Footsteps began as an informal social group, and soon developed an educational study group and a sex education and relationships group, members finding they had been denied access to basic sex education instruction within the Haredi community.

As the organization grew, it became a 501(c) non-profit, with a broad remit of support and education for ex-Haredi Jews. Footsteps can also provide counseling, and has partnered with New York Legal Assistance Group to provide legal assistance and advice in divorce and custody cases.

As of 2015, Footsteps had a permanent staff of 10, a membership of over 1000, and an annual budget in excess of $1 million. Its current director is Lani Santo. The organization's program director is Chani Getter.

== Activities ==
Muslimish' ex-Muslims president Noura Embabi explains how they co-operate with Footsteps' formerly ultra-Orthodox Jews.

Footsteps provides an array of services for its members. The Footsteps offices are known as "The Space", and are situated at an unpublicized location, due to privacy concerns. They contain a computer lab, library, meeting space, kitchenette, and lounge, where members can work and hang out. Members gather for various groups, events, and workshops on topics including dating and sexuality, navigating the college admissions process, career advancement, and painting.

Footsteps also holds several annual events, which are open to members and guests. Events include: Thanksgiving dinner, Passover Potluck, and an annual camping trip. Since 2009, "Footsteps Celebrates" has been held each year in June, to celebrate graduations, accomplishments, and leadership roles. During the summer months of 2012, Footsteps organized a weekly soccer game in Prospect Park. During winter, an indoor game of basketball took place bi-weekly.

Footsteps has also held annual art shows in which it exhibits works by Footsteps members.

== Impact ==
Abby Stein, a formerly Ultra-Orthodox rabbi and author in her book Becoming Eve, as well as in numerous interviews, credits Footsteps with helping her succeed after she left the Hasidic community, even calling their work "life saving." In a March 2021 interview with the New York magazine, she credits Footsteps therapists with helping her both, when she left the Hasidic community, and later when she came out as transgender women, saying that speaking with a Footsteps social worker "was the first time I ever spoke to a professional where I felt listened to, as opposed to feeling like a problem that needed solving."

== Leadership ==
Board members include author Shulem Deen and businessman Steve Eisman.

== Notable members ==
- Shulem Deen, author
- Chani Getter, councillor
- Naftuli Moster, founder of YAFFED and CEO until late 2022.
- Abby Stein, author and trans activist
- Luzer Twersky, actor
- Jericho Vincent, author

== Media exposure ==
Footsteps has been featured in numerous media outlets, including the New York Times, the Wall Street Journal, the Guardian, PBS, NBC, and many others. The book Unchosen: The Hidden Lives of Hasidic Rebels by Hella Winston relates the story of the founder of Footsteps and some of those who have gone through the organization as part of their journey to leave the Haredi and Hasidic communities. The National Geographic program, "Inside Hasidism", included a segment about Footsteps and some of its members. The 2017 documentary, One of Us, features Footsteps and its members extensively.

== See also ==
- Freidom
- Faith to Faithless
- Mavar, a UK-based organization which supports the transition of leaving the Haredi lifestyle in Britain
- Off the derech
- One of Us
- Religious disaffiliation
- Pathways Melbourne- an Australian based non-profit that supports and empowers religious Jewish people who are questioning their lifestyle, practices and beliefs (strictly confidential).
