= Drew Binsky =

American travel blogger (born 1991)

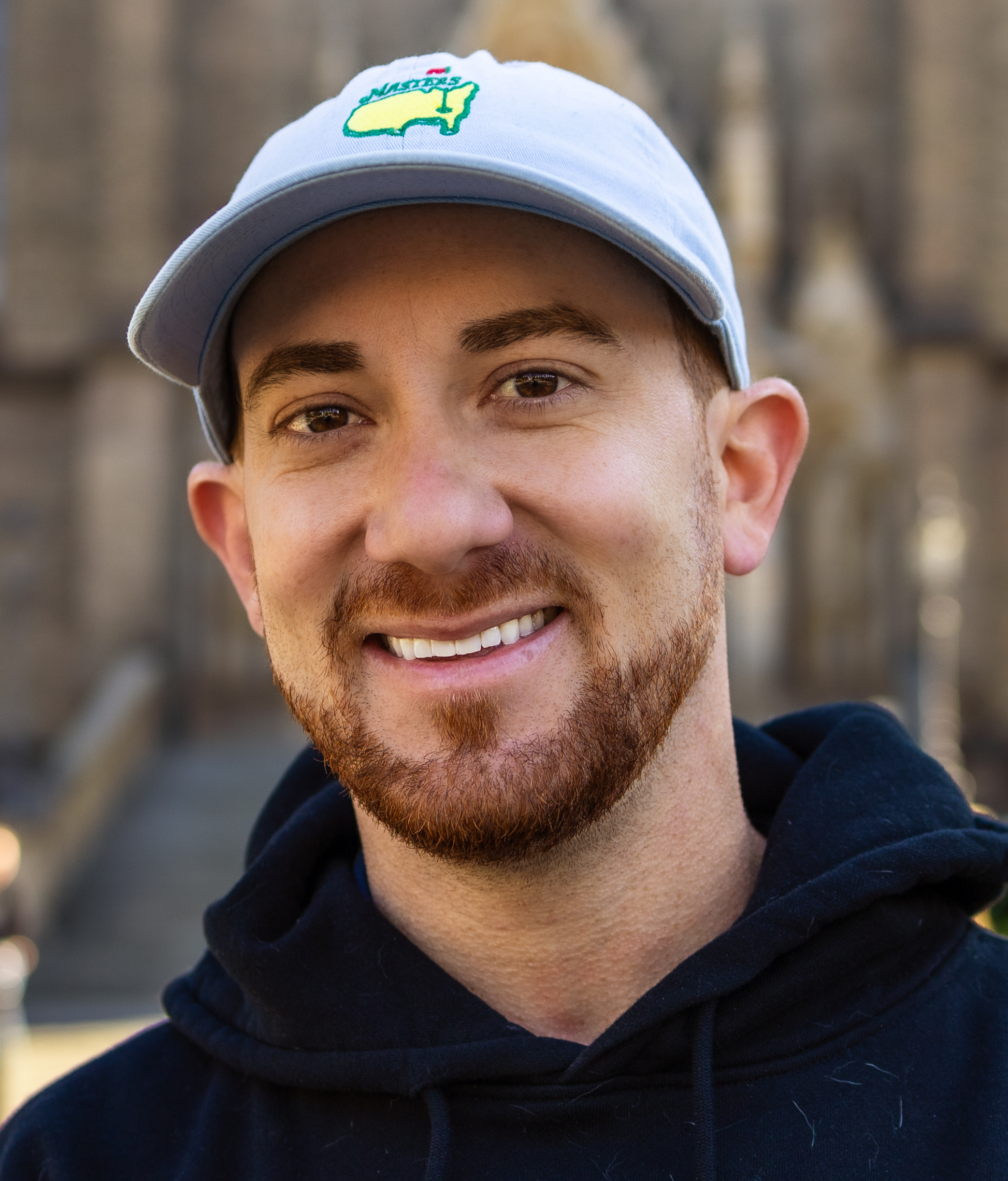
- Binsky in 2024
- Born: Drew Goldberg; May 24, 1991 (age 35); Dallas, Texas, U.S.
- Education: University of Wisconsin–Madison (BS)
- Occupations: YouTuber; Content creator; Travel blogger
- Spouse: Deanna Sallao (m. 2023)

YouTube information
- Channel: Drew Binsky
- Years active: 2015–present
- Genres: Travel; adventure; humanity; inspiration
- Subscribers: 7.11 million
- Views: 1.5 billion
- Last updated: July 02, 2026
- Website: drewbinsky.com

Drew Goldberg (born May 24, 1991), known by his online alias, Drew Binsky, is an American YouTuber known for his travel vlogs. He completed his goal of visiting every United Nations recognized country in the world on October 29, 2021 in Saudi Arabia. He authored Just Go, a book that documents his travel stories.

== Early life and education ==
Binsky was born Drew Goldberg in Dallas, Texas and grew up in Scottsdale, Arizona. "Binsky" was a nickname given to him by his family, of German Jewish origin. His first ever trip overseas was to Israel in 2009.

He attended the University of Wisconsin–Madison, graduating in 2013 with degrees in economics and entrepreneurship. During his third year in university, he entered into a study abroad program in Prague, Czech Republic. He studied there for 1 semester, and traveled to more than 20 countries across Europe. During this time he decided to make a career out of traveling.

== Career ==
After college, Binsky took a job teaching English in Seoul, South Korea. He spent 18 months teaching there, earned his black belt in Taekwondo and traveled to 20 countries in Asia during that time. In 2015, he quit his teaching job and began focusing on traveling full-time, starting with a 3-month solo trip across India. By October 2015, he had visited a total of 73 countries. He also had started a travel blog called "The Hungry Partier" (later renamed "Drew Binsky") and began documenting his travels on Instagram and Snapchat.

In 2017, his girlfriend at the time, Deanna Sallao, bought him a camera when they moved to Hanoi, Vietnam, which prompted him to create and begin posting videos on his YouTube channel (also called "Drew Binsky"). In May 2017, he uploaded a video of an organized trip to North Korea on his YouTube and Facebook channels. The video accumulated over 10 million views within 2 days. Binsky also began earning money from YouTube and Facebook advertising revenue and sponsored partnerships with various brands. He has over 12 million followers on social media and holds two Guinness World Records: visiting the most UNESCO Heritage sites in a 24-hour period and for the fastest time to pack a suitcase. In 2018, he began living in and working from Bangkok, Thailand, and, in 2019, began operating out of Manila, Philippines.

In October 2019, Binsky met Zablon Simintov, who was thought to be the only remaining Jew still living in Afghanistan at the time, and featured him in a video that accumulated over 1 million views. His channel's three most viewed videos depict his encounters with Wim Hof in the Netherlands, the "tallest people in the world" in South Sudan, and Thai Ngoc—a man who claims to have not slept since 1962—in Vietnam.

In 2020, Binsky announced an upcoming documentary on his travels called Border 197. Binsky's goal was to travel to all 197 countries recognized by the United Nations in the world by the end of 2020 and before his 30th birthday, but due to the COVID-19 pandemic, he completed his goal on October 29, 2021, by visiting Saudi Arabia. In 2024, he released Just Go, a book that documents his travel stories from visiting 197 countries. In 2026, he released a Netflix show documenting his travels.

== Personal life ==
Binsky became engaged to Deanna Sallao in May 2021, and the two were married on Balesin Island in the Philippines on Valentine's Day 2023. After graduating from college, he had aspirations of becoming a professional golfer. As part of his travels, he plays and reviews golf courses around the world. As of 2021, he resides in Phoenix, Arizona.
