= Chani Getter =

American counselor

Chani Getter is an American counselor and interfaith minister focusing on those leaving the Haredi Jewish community and those in transition. They are also an activist and educator who supports the LGBTQ community.

Their life and work has been featured in two documentary films, DevOUT (2012) and One of Us (2017).

== Early life ==
Chani Getter was born into a Haredi Jewish family affiliated with the Nikolsburg-Monsey Hasidic community, and was legally married off by their family at the age of seventeen. Getter had three children over the next five years, before coming out as gay, a story that was covered in the documentary film devOUT and also featured in a PBS documentary television show, Religious & Ethics Newsweekly. They later left their husband with their children, which resulted in divorce. Getter then became a part of the Jewish Renewal movement, and maintained their Orthodox observances for some time. They have been critical of the insular nature of Hasidic communities in New York City.

== Career ==
Getter was previously the program director at Footsteps, which aids former Haredi Jewish people enter mainstream society, including those exiting to follow their natural sexual preferences. Their work as a life coach and counselor was featured in the documentary film One of Us. They have also facilitated an LGBTQ women's support group for Keshet.
