= Jericho Vincent =

American author (born 1982)

- Born: Leah Vincent; February 5, 1982 (age 44)
- Education: Brooklyn College
- Occupations: Writer, Blogger, Journalist

Jericho Vincent is an American author and speaker. They are best known for their books, Cut Me Loose and Legends of the Talmud.

== Early life and education ==
Born Leah Vincent, they were raised in Pittsburgh, Pennsylvania. They were a student at Brooklyn College from 2002 to 2007. They graduated from Harvard's John F. Kennedy School of Government with a Master of Public Policy degree as a Pforzheimer Fellow in 2009.

== Career ==
They were named one of Jewish Week’s 36 Under 36 in 2014.

Vincent is an advocate for "reform" within the Haredi Jewish community. They have spoken out on issues of abuse in the religious community.

Vincent is both a member and a board member of Footsteps, an organization that serves former Haredi Jews who seek to enter or explore the world beyond the Jewish communities in which they were raised.

Their essays calling for reform have been published by HuffPost, Unpious, and Zeek.

In 2016, Vincent participated in a project called Real Women Real Stories founded by Matan Uziel.

== Personal life ==
Vincent was thrown out of their ultra-orthodox family at the age of 16.

In 2019, Vincent came out as non-binary, and changed their first name to "Jericho".

== Publications ==
- Cut Me Loose: Sin and Salvation After My Ultra-Orthodox Girlhood, New York: Nan A. Talese / Doubleday, January 2014, ISBN 978-0-385-53809-1
