= Congregation Kolot Chayeinu =

Jewish congregation in Brooklyn, New York

- Hebrew: קולות חיינו
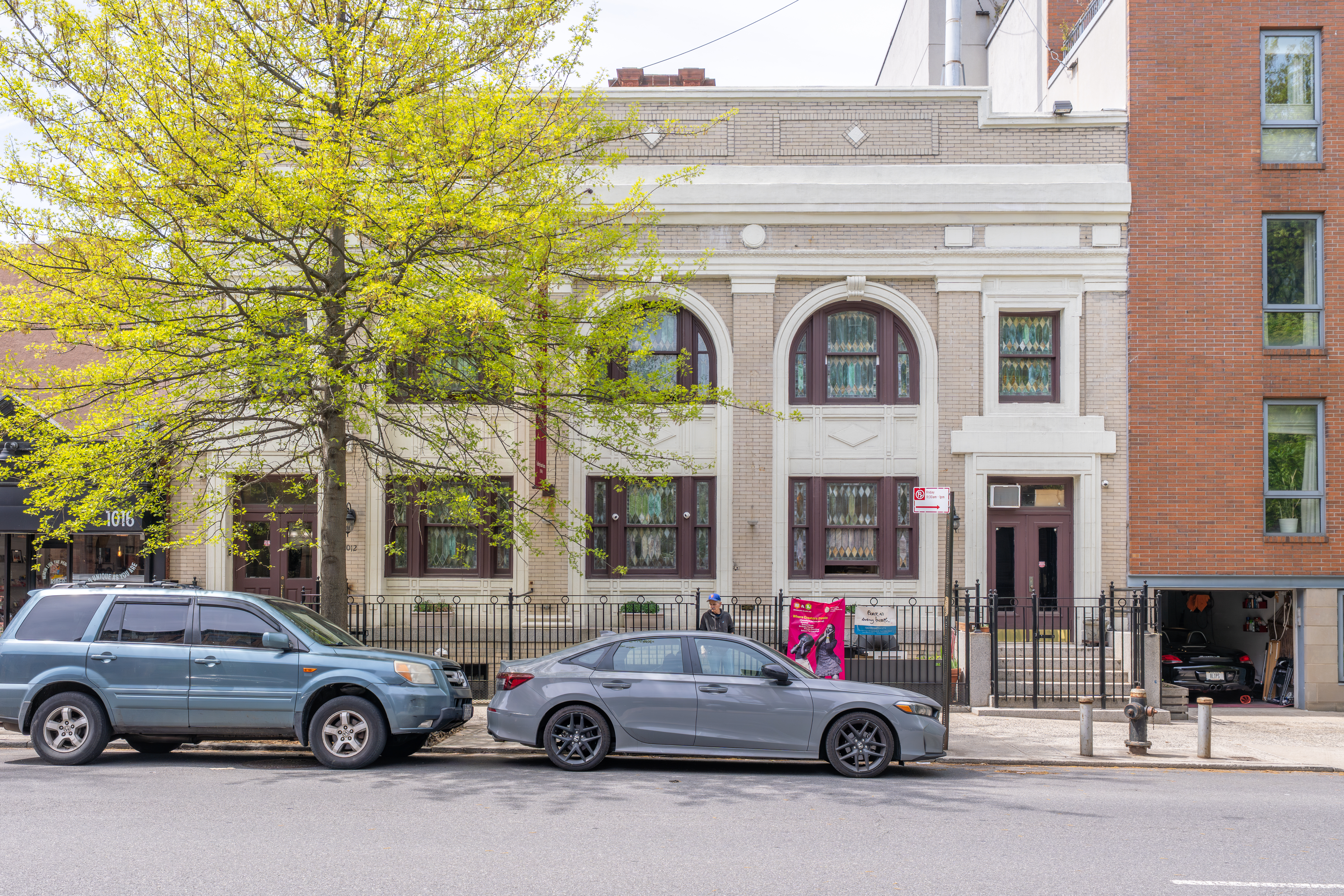
- Meeting place in Gethsemane Church

- Location in New York City

Religion
- Affiliation: Judaism
- Rite: Unaffiliated
- Ecclesiastical or organizational status: Congregation
- Leadership: Rabbi Sam Kates-Goldman Cantor Lisa B. Segal
- Status: Active

Location
- Location: Gethsemane Church, 1012 8th Ave, Park Slope, Brooklyn, New York City, New York 11215
- Country: United States
- Interactive map of Congregation Kolot Chayeinu
- Coordinates: 40°39′53″N 73°58′48″W

Architecture
- Founder: Rabbi Ellen Lippmann
- Established: 1993 (as a congregation)

Website
- kolotchayeinu.org

Congregation Kolot Chayeinu (Hebrew: קולות חיינו, lit. 'Voices of Our Lives') is a progressive unaffiliated Jewish congregation, that worships in Gethsemane Church, at 1012 8th Avenue, Park Slope, Brooklyn, New York City, New York, United States.

== History ==
Rabbi Ellen Lippmann established Kolot Chayeinu, a progressive Jewish synagogue in Brooklyn in 1993, initially as a small group of people that met around her dining room table. Over the years it has grown to have its own space and staff, including a rabbi and cantor (both ordained), 300+ members, and a Children's Learning Program.
