= Let There Be Light (2007 film) =

- Directed by: Meni Philip and Noam Reuveni
- Release date: 2007 (Israel)
- Running time: 59 minutes
- Country: Israel
- Language: Hebrew

Let There Be Light is a 2007 Israeli documentary film about Meni Philip, a Haredi Jewish man who leaves his traditional community. The documentary was directed by Meni Phillip and Noam Reuveni, and was screened at the 2007 Jerusalem Film Festival.

== See also ==
- Unorthodox (miniseries)
- One of Us (2017 film)
- Leaving the Fold
- Off the derech
