= Kelsey Osgood =

American author

Kelsey Osgood is an American author.

She is a graduate of Columbia University and the MFA program in Creative Nonfiction at Goucher College.

== Books ==
- How to Disappear Completely: On Modern Anorexia (Abrams Press, 2013)
- Godstruck: Seven Women's Unexpected Journeys to Religious Conversion (Viking, 2025)
