= Luzer Twersky =

American film and television actor (born 1985)

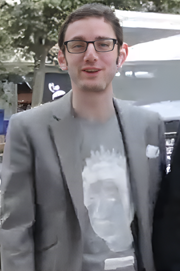
- Twersky in 2014
- Born: July 26, 1985 (age 40); New York City, U.S.
- Occupation: Actor

Luzer Twersky (born July 26, 1985) is an American film and television actor. He is best known for his role in the film Felix and Meira, for which he garnered a Jutra Award nomination as Best Supporting Actor at the 18th Jutra Awards and won the Best Actor award at the Amiens International Film Festival and the Torino International Film Festival.

== Career ==
Born and raised in Brooklyn as a Hasidic Jew, Twersky left the community in 2008, after struggling with his faith. He later met fashion designer Duncan Quinn, becoming a model and a retail manager for Quinn's store in Los Angeles, until taking his first acting role in 2010. By 2012, he was cast in his first leading role, in the film Where Is Joel Baum?.

In 2015, he also had a recurring role in the television series Transparent. He appeared in the second season of the HBO show High Maintenance.

In September 2017, he appeared as one of the main characters in the Netflix documentary One of Us, where directors Heidi Ewing and Rachel Grady follow him years after he leaves his Hasidic community in Brooklyn, New York, and how he deals with his ostracization.

In 2023, Twersky played the role of Hasidic Judaism founder, holy man Baal Shem Tov (the Besht) in Ukrainian film «Dovbush» directed by Oles Sanin.

Twersky is mentioned in Penn Jillette's book "God, No!".

== Personal life ==
Twersky is a cousin of rabbi and transgender activist Abby Stein.
