= One of Us (2017 film) =

2017 American documentary film

- Film poster
- Directed by: Heidi Ewing; Rachel Grady
- Produced by: Heidi Ewing; Rachel Grady
- Cinematography: Jenni Morello; Alex Takats
- Edited by: J. D. Marlow; Enat Sidi
- Music by: T. Griffin
- Production company: Loki Films
- Distributed by: Netflix
- Release date: October 20, 2017
- Running time: 95 minutes
- Country: United States
- Languages: English; Yiddish

One of Us is a 2017 documentary feature film that chronicles the lives of three ex-Hasidic Jews from Brooklyn. The film was directed by Heidi Ewing and Rachel Grady, who also created the documentary Jesus Camp. One of Us opened at the Toronto International Film Festival in September 2017, and was distributed the following month of October via Netflix, which also financed the film.

== Synopsis ==
The film follows the lives of three ex-members of Brooklyn's Hasidic community: Ari Hershkowitz, Luzer Twersky, and Etty Ausch. Each struggles with being ostracized from their former community and families, while revealing how they came to leave. The film also reveals their experience with religious doubt, as well as with both domestic abuse and childhood sexual abuse. Some receive support from ex-Haredi organizations such as Footsteps, while others work to find a footing in the secular world. The film also follows counselor Chani Getter in their work with helping former ultra-Orthodox individuals settle into the outside world.

== Reception ==
One of Us received overall positive reception from critics, garnering a 79% score from Metacritic. On the review aggregator website Rotten Tomatoes, 93% of 28 critics' reviews are positive, with an average rating of 7.3/10. The site's critics consensus reads, "Harrowing and heartbreaking, One of Us offers an intimate, revealing glimpse inside a notoriously private community and those who would dare defy it."

In one review, LA Weekly said of the film: "Although the focus remains squarely on its three subjects, One of Us effectively contextualizes this strange, backward community thriving in the middle of one of the most multicultural cities in the world."

In Vulture.com, David Edelstein described "the relentless psychological abuse that this community inflicts when a member attempts to leave, especially with children in tow", and said that the film-makers "had no interest in making an 'objective documentary', although I doubt the Hasidim would have made themselves available to two women with a camera and their own hair. In such cases, they usually say, 'If you want to understand us, read the Torah.'"

== Awards ==
One of Us won "Most Compelling Living Subject of a Documentary" at the Critics' Choice Documentary Awards, as well as being nominated for "Best Documentary". The film was also nominated for "Best Documentary Feature" at the Philadelphia Film Festival in 2017.

== See also ==
- Menashe (film)
- Unorthodox (miniseries), Docudrama based on the memoir of Deborah Feldman, who left her Hasidic community
- Leaving the Fold
- Let There Be Light (2007 film)
- Off the derech
