= Shulem Deen =

American writer

Shulem Deen (born 1974) is an American author, essayist, former Skver Hasid, and critic of Hasidic Judaism. He is the author of the memoir All Who Go Do Not Return (2015), and is a regular columnist at The Forward. He is also the founding editor of Unpious, a journal for voices critical of Hasidic lifestyle and beliefs.

== Career ==
Deen first became known as the author of the blog "Hasidic Rebel", which he wrote from 2003 until 2012, and which was the subject of a 2003 feature article in the Village Voice. Deen's blog was the first widely read website by a born Hasid casting doubt on his religious faith. In 2010, Deen launched the Unpious website, along with "Shtreimel", another ex-Hasidic blogger, and has served as its editor throughout. The site was intended as a platform for voices critical of the Hasidic lifestyle and beliefs.

Deen's memoir, All Who Go Do Not Return, was published in 2015, and chronicles his transition from devout member of the Skver Hasidic sect to secular Jew. Deen's book is part of a subgenre of memoirs by formerly Haredi writers, and is considered to be one of the best.

Deen is a regular columnist at The Forward, and writes widely on the intersection of Hasidic and secular life, including articles in the New Republic, Salon, and Tablet. Even though his work is perceived to be critical of the Hasidic lifestyle and worldview, he has appeared on Orthodox media, such as David Bashevkin's 18Forty podcast.

Deen currently serves as a board member at Footsteps, a New York City organization that assists formerly Haredi Jews with transitioning to life outside the Haredi world.

== Awards ==
- 2015 National Jewish Book Awards, Myra H. Kraft Memorial Award for Contemporary Jewish Life and Practice
- 2016 Great Lakes Colleges Association New Writers Award for Creative Non-Fiction
- 2017 Prix Médicis essai for Celui qui va vers elle ne revient pas (All Who Go Do Not Return)

== Personal life ==
Deen spent his early life among Satmar Hasidim in the Borough Park section of Brooklyn, and joined the Skver Hasidic dynasty when he was a teenager, moving to the town of New Square, New York, the movement's headquarters, to settle after marriage. He was married in 1993, and has five children. In 2005, Deen was expelled from New Square by its leaders for holding heretical views, and several years later, he divorced his wife and left the Hasidic lifestyle entirely. He is mostly estranged from his children, who have remained among the Skverer Hasidim in New Square, New York. He currently lives in Brooklyn, New York.

== Select articles ==
- "Too Cool", Tablet, June 22, 2011
- Deen, Shulem (April 19, 2012). "The Sound of Sin". Salon. Archived from the original on April 19, 2012.
- "In Death of Ex-Hasid, a Mirror for Trauma of Many", Tablet, October 2, 2013
- "Op-Ed: Chasidic Schools Ensure Ignorance and Poverty", The Jewish Week, September 17, 2015
- "My Roommate, the Prostitute", Narratively, January 7, 2015
- "How I Kept My Faith in Faith", The Forward, December 1, 2015
