= Unorthodox: The Scandalous Rejection of My Hasidic Roots =

Book by Deborah Feldman

- Author: Deborah Feldman
- Publisher: Simon & Schuster
- Publication date: February 14, 2012
- Pages: 272
- ISBN: 978-1439187012

Unorthodox: The Scandalous Rejection of My Hasidic Roots is a 2012 memoir by Deborah Feldman. In the book, she documents her life in an ultra-religious Jewish community in Brooklyn, New York. The Netflix miniseries Unorthodox is loosely based on the book.

== Overview ==
Feldman was born into Satmar community in Brooklyn where the primary language is Yiddish. The community maintains a code of customs governing everything from what one wears, what is read, and to whom one generally speaks.

Feldman's move away from the community started with going to the library and hiding books written in English. At 17, she was married. Feldman said she did not have sex education, claimed she was trapped in a sexually and emotionally dysfunctional marriage, and the failure to produce a child dominated her life. After becoming pregnant, she realized she wanted something more for her child, and planned to leave the community.

== Reception ==
Publishers Weekly called the book an "engaging and at times gripping insight into Brooklyn's Hasidic community".

Lisa Bonos of The Washington Post wrote that "Feldman seems to render this secretive community authentically; I only wish she'd spent a bit more time editing herself. The lopsided book traverses her childhood in painstaking detail, which is often redundant and overwrought... I certainly understood that Feldman wanted more out of life; but in the end, I wanted more from her narration. How did she handle such a tough transition, raising a child while attending college at Sarah Lawrence? She spends so much time on the world she left—without much exploration of where she's ended up."

The Jewish Book Council reviewed the book, saying: "In the Satmar world, what Feldman did was scandalous, but her story didn't provide the drama and intrigue it seemed to have promised. However, it does provide a window into a world not many of us know about or can fathom. Her story, slow at first, invites us into the homes and mindsets of the Satmar people, at times wholesome and warm, and at others lonely, shocking, and disturbing. Feldman is reflective, never mincing words, saying exactly how she feels about everything. For a woman with little formal secular education, her writing is eloquent and stirring."

The New York Jewish Week reported that the book "spurred a cottage industry devoted to dispelling its inaccuracies".

== Miniseries ==
The 2020 Netflix original miniseries, Unorthodox, is loosely based on this book. Netflix also produced a documentary, Making Unorthodox, that chronicles the creative process and filming, and discusses the differences between the book and the series.

== About the author ==
After leaving the Hasidic community, Deborah Feldman started blogging, and in 2012, she published her autobiography, Unorthodox: The Scandalous Rejection of My Hasidic Roots. In 2014, she moved to Berlin, continued to work as a writer, and published Exodus: A Memoir. Both books have been translated into German, and were well received by critics, which led to her appearing on various talk shows on German TV.

Feldman is featured in the 2018 Swiss-German documentary #Female Pleasure.

== See also ==
- Off the derech
