= Philip Delaquis =

Swiss film and theatre producer

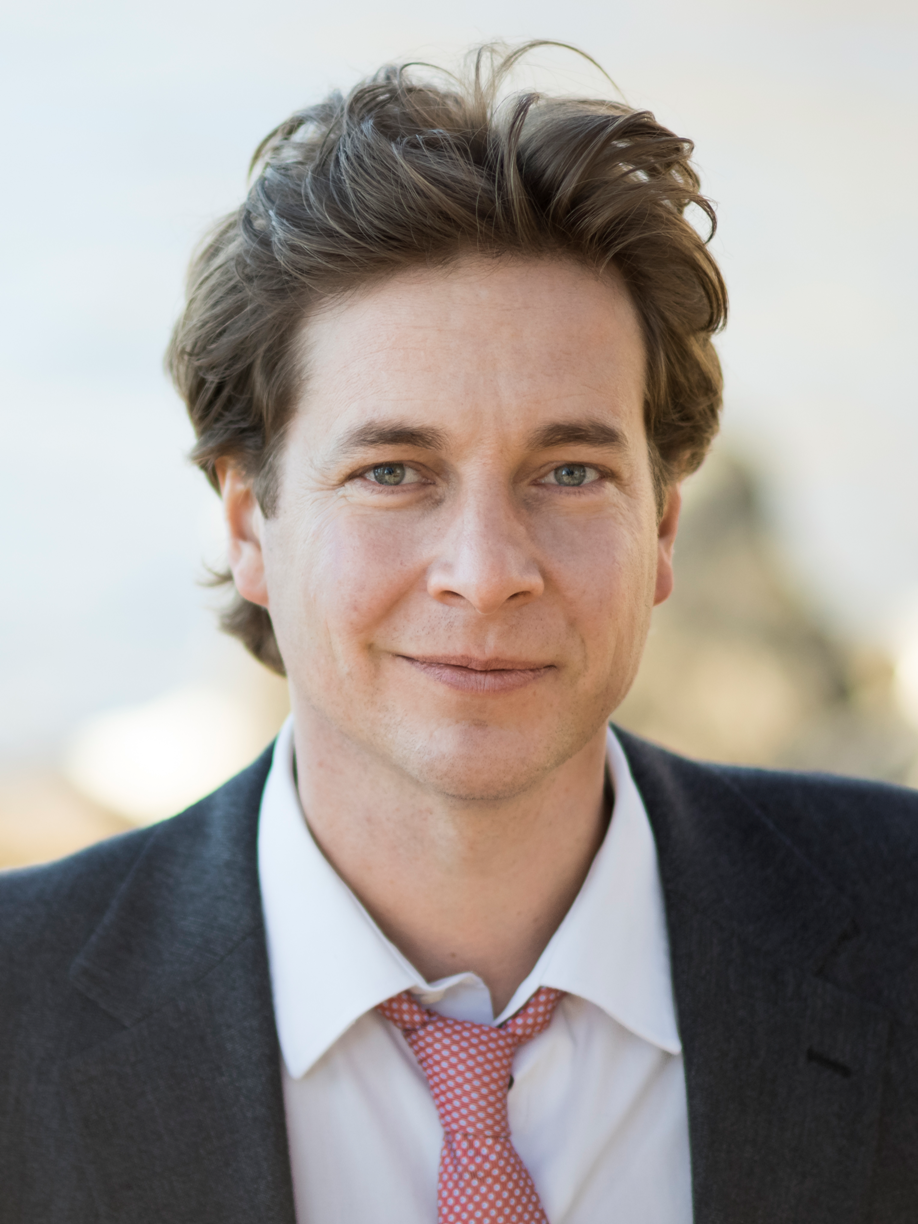
- Philip Delaquis in 2013
- Born: 29 July 1974 (age 51) Bern, Switzerland
- Occupation: Producer (film/theatre)

Philip Delaquis (born 29 July 1974) is a Swiss film and theatre producer and member of the Swiss Film Academy and the European Film Academy.

== Biography ==
Philip Delaquis was born on 29 July 1974 in Bern. He attended schools in Spiez and Interlaken, graduated in 1994 and worked as a newspaper photographer before enrolling at Bern's School of Design and completing film courses at FOCAL, later acquiring a lic.rer.pol. in business and media science at the University of Bern and Humboldt University of Berlin and launching a TV editorial career with the Swiss Broadcasting Corporation SRG SSR. In his spare time, he made short films and organised film festivals, including DVD ShortICutsIBern & Zurich and the festival Talent Screen. In 2005, Delaquis co-founded the Zurich-based film production company Das Kollektiv für audiovisuelle Werke GmbH.

This company produced several award-winning films, including the feature documentary Yalom's Cure (2014), which screened in cinemas in over ten European countries and the documentary Forbidden Voices (2012), which won the Amnesty International Award and the WACC-SIGNIS Human Rights Award. The company also produced GURU – Bhagwan, His Secretary & His Bodyguard (2011). All the three films were nominated for the Swiss Film Award. Further film productions include the feature film Soundless Wind Chime (2009) by Kit Hung, which won over ten international awards and premiered in the official selection of the Berlin International Film Festival. Together with Barbara Miller, Delaquis established the production company Mons Veneris Films in 2014.

He also developed and produced Dällebach Kari – The musical based on the Swiss figure Dällebach Kari. The production premiered at the Thunerseespiele, then had runs at Theater 11 in Zürich and Rote Halle Bern. He also worked on the musical The Visit – Der Besuch der alten Dame (2013) which premiered at the Thunerseespiele and later was performed at the Ronacher Theatre in Vienna.

In 2024, he partnered with Richard Gere and Oren Moverman for the documentary Wisdom of Happiness a movie on the 14th Dalai Lama.

== Filmography ==
- 2006: One Love – Jürg Halter vs Kutti MC (TV documentary)
- 2007: Giraffes Don’t Go to Heaven (animation)
- 2008: FC Murmeli (animation)
- 2008: Sunny Hill (feature film)
- 2009: Soundless Wind Chime (feature film)
- 2009: Die kleine Monsterin (animated TV series)
- 2010: GURU: Bhagwan, His Secretary & His Bodyguard (documentary)
- 2012: Forbidden Voices (documentary)
- 2014: Friedrich Dürrenmatt im Labyrinth (TV documentary)
- 2014: Yalom's Cure (documentary)
- 2015: DÜRRENMATT – eine Liebesgeschichte (documentary)
- 2016: Emily Kempin-Spiry (TV documentary)
- 2018: #Female Pleasure (documentary)
- 2024: Wisdom of Happiness (documentary)
- 2024: E.1027: Eileen Gray and the House by the Sea (documentary)
