= Love Matters =

Love Matters may refer to:

- Love Matters (film), a Singaporean comedy film
- Love Matters (program), a global program providing information on relationships, sex and love
