= Anna Platen =

German actress

- Born: April 15, 1995 (age 31); Dormagen, Germany

Anna Platen (born 15 April 1995, Dormagen) is a German actress and model.

== Early life and education ==
Anna Platen studied theatre at the Otto-Falckenberg-Schule in Munich, and was part of several theatre productions at the Münchner Kammerspiele and at the Düsseldorfer Schauspielhaus. Since 2018 she has worked on German TV and movie productions as well as international projects.

Anna Platen speaks German, English, Hebrew and French. She lives in New York.

== Filmography ==
Year	Film/Series	Company	Role	Notes	Ref
2016	SOKO München		Zombie		
2018	PAN	Kurzfilm			
2018	Lola	Kurzfilm			
2018	Zoe	Kurzfilm			
2018	Alarm for Cobra 11 – The Highway Police		Das Power-Paar		
2019	Marie Brand und der Reiz der Gewalt				
2019	Um Himmels Willen		Dunkle Wolken		
2019	SOKO Wismar		Benzin im Blut		
2020	Turn of The Tide				
2020	In aller Freundschaft – Die jungen Ärzte		Zwickmühle		
2021	Windstill				
2021	Dawn Breaks Behind the Eyes				
2021	Para – Wir sind King				
2021	Hannes				
2021-2022	SOKO Kitzbühel		Perspektiven, Start Up		
2023	Notruf Hafenkante		Krankhaft schön		
