= Vithika =

Vithika may refer to:

- Vithika Sheru Indian actress
- Vithika Yadav Indian human rights activist
