= Wisdom of Happiness =

2024 documentary film

- Poster of the film
- Directed by: Barbara Miller; Philip Delaquis
- Produced by: Philip Delaquis
- Cinematography: Manuel Bauer
- Edited by: Isai Oswald; Mike Selemon
- Music by: Ariel Marx
- Production companies: Das Kollektiv für audiovisuelle Werke; Mons Veneris Films
- Distributed by: Ascot Elite Entertainment
- Release date: 8 October 2024 (Zurich)
- Running time: 90 minutes
- Countries: Switzerland; United States
- Language: English
- Box office: $666,183

Wisdom of Happiness is a 2024 documentary film directed by Barbara Miller and Philip Delaquis, featuring the 14th Dalai Lama. The film explores themes of inner peace, compassion, and navigating 21st-century challenges, presenting an intimate perspective on the Dalai Lama’s teachings. Co-produced by Switzerland and the United States, it premiered at the Zurich Film Festival on 8 October 2024 in Gala Premiers and has been distributed globally across multiple countries.

== Synopsis ==
The documentary captures the Dalai Lama, nearing his 90th birthday, speaking directly to viewers about achieving happiness and peace in a world facing global unrest, environmental crises, and political tensions.

Through a combination of personal reflections, never-before-seen archival footage from his early life as Tenzin Gyatso, and cinematic visuals, the film emphasizes compassion and mindfulness as universal values.

The Dalai Lama addresses contemporary issues, advocating for inner transformation as a foundation for global harmony.

Film critic Andreas Furler writes : The film centers on the 'teachings', those spiritual and practical instructions that the great man, in all his humility, delivers directly to the camera: compassion and active solidarity, and the mastery of negative thoughts and feelings through breathing and meditation techniques.

== Production ==
Wisdom of Happiness was directed by Swiss filmmakers Philip Delaquis and Barbara Miller, who collaborated on previous documentaries through their production companies "Das Kollektiv für audiovisuelle Werke" and "Mons Veneris Films".

The film was co-produced by Walo Kamm, Tashi Albertini-Kaiser, Tobias Asch, Hanspeter Maurer-Adotsang, and Monlam Maurer-Adotsang.

Richard Gere and Oren Moverman served as executive producers. Richard Gere, who is a "friend and a student" of the Dalai Lama helps to promote the film and said in a video appearance during Croatian International Film Festival: He is not just a wise man; he is a generous man who understands how our minds work and how our hearts work.

Cinematography was handled by Manuel Bauer, who is considered by the Dalai Lama as a close friend, since he has documented him throughout many years as a photographer and a cameraperson.

Additional Cinematography was done by Quinn Reimann, with editing by Isai Oswald and Mike Selemon, and music composed by Ariel Marx. The six-year production process included sourcing rare archival footage of the Dalai Lama, starting from his appointment as Tibet's spiritual leader at age four.

== Release and distribution ==
The film premiered at the 20th Zurich Film Festival on 8 October 2024, followed by screening at the 60th Solothurner Filmtage (January 2025), Films from the South (November 2024), and Dharamshala International Film Festival (2024).

It was released theatrically across multiple countries, including Switzerland (December 5, 2024), Germany (November 7, 2024), Greece (December 12, 2024), Italy (May 25, 2025), and Japan (September 3, 2025), among others, with distribution handled by companies like X Verleih AG (Germany) and Ascot Elite Entertainment (Switzerland). The film is also available on streaming platforms such as Netflix and Prime Video.

It was screened at the 78th Locarno Film Festival on 14 August 2025, in Panorama Suisse.

The US release will be on the 16th of October, with an introduction by Richard Gere in Manhattan, screened at theaters across the country.

== Reception ==
Katja Richard writes in Blick: A meditative film experience. In it, the audience comes closer to his holiness than ever before. Peter Gutting writes : The remarkable thing about the film is its unique combination of utmost intimacy with sweeping imagery. These are shots of fascinating visual power contributed by cinematographer Manuel Bauer. They don’t shy away from the problems facing the twenty-first century, but they transform them into dazzling beauty—and into the principle of hope. Deadline.com stated: With cinematography by long-time Dalai Lama documentarian Manuel Bauer, the film combines unprecedented access, powerful cinematic visuals, and never-before-seen archival material to provide a once-in-a-lifetime audience. Cinema Daily US writes : The filmmakers experiment with new forms and content, interweaving the Dalai Lama’s reflections with evocative images of our planet and rare, recently discovered archival footage. For the interview they used a technique invented by Errol Morris, that allowed Miller to speak face-to-face with the Dalai Lama, who responded to her and at the same time directly into the camera lens. Host Mika Brzezinski talks of unprecedent access on MS NOW’s show Morning Joe. Richard Gere, as co-producer, says of the film it is a corrective and maybe even medicine for our time in a podcast, co-hosted by Oscar winner John Ridley, who found it deeply profound as it meets the audience in so many levels. He sees life lessons. How do I calm down? How do I get through my day? The critic April Neale says, the film doesn’t lecture and is an antidote to the burnout of modern life in a review for the Alliance of Women Film Journalists. Forget religion, she quotes the Dalai Lama, to stress that his message is about what it really means to be happy. And sees a feminist resonance, as he speaks about the ‘feminine principle’ of compassion, suggesting that his successor could be a woman.

=== Box office ===
As of 14 February 2026 the film has collected US$928,181 worldwide.

== Awards ==
- Nomination Cinema for Peace Awards (2025) in the category of Cinema for Peace Dove for The Most Valuable Documentary of the Year.
