= Kevin Kopacka =

Austrian filmmaker (born 1987)

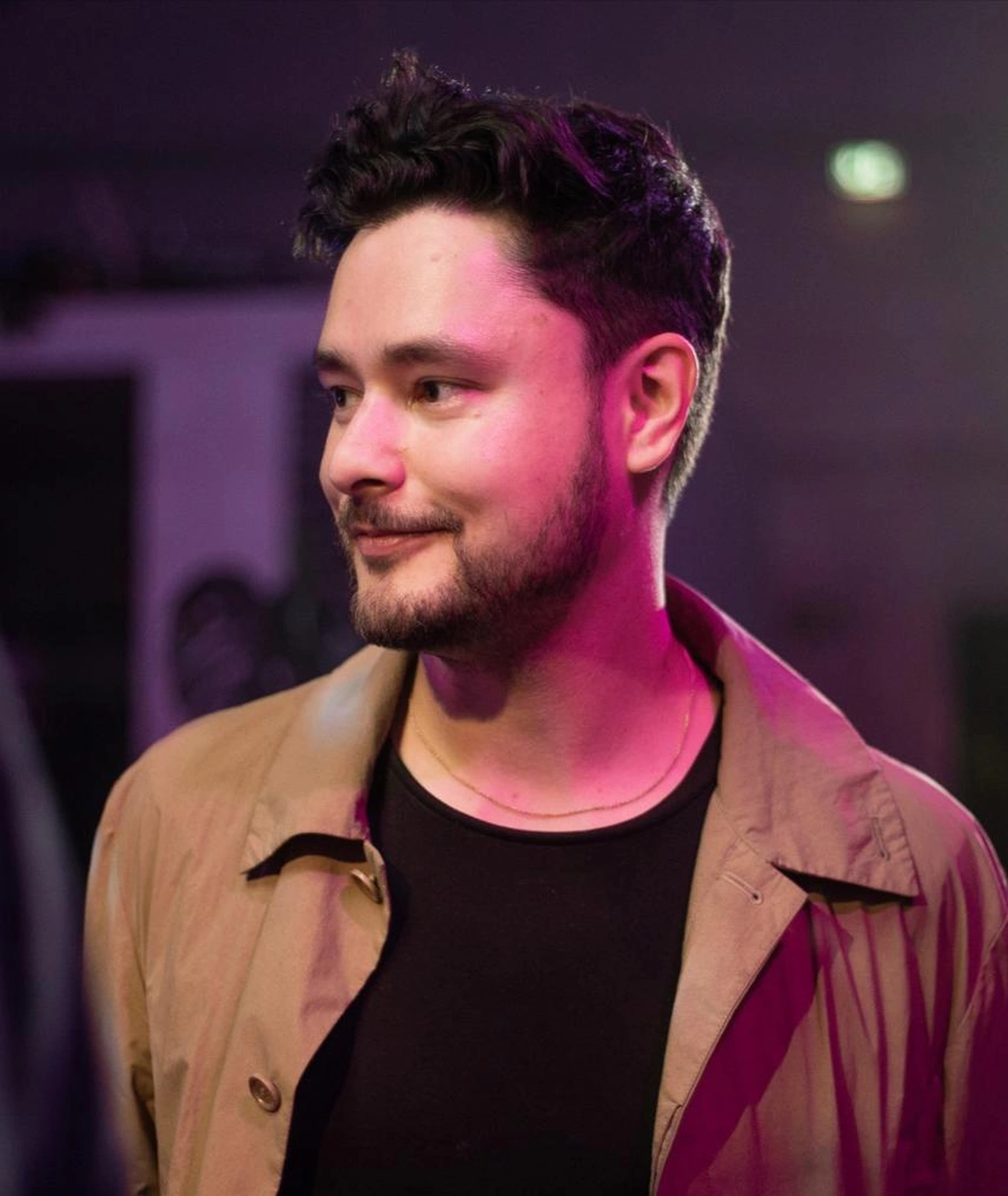
- Kopacka on set, 2023
- Born: 1987 (age 38–39); Graz, Austria
- Occupations: Filmmaker, painter

Kevin Kopacka is an Austrian–Sri Lankan filmmaker and painter best known for writing and directing the 2021 horror film Dawn Breaks Behind the Eyes.

== Early life ==
Kopacka grew up in Graz, Austria, as the son of Austrian journalist and writer Werner Kopacka and Ramani Kopacka from Sri Lanka. Kopacka has lived in Berlin, Germany, since 2006, where he completed his studies in fine arts at the Berlin University of the Arts as a Master Student in the class of Japanese artist Leiko Ikemura.

In 2012, Kopacka was named one of the "Top 30 Groundbreaking Artists Under 30" by the US trade magazine Art Business News. He has exhibited his art in Germany, Austria, Switzerland, Northern Ireland, France and the United States.

== Film career ==
After graduating from university, Kopacka started working on short films. His first short film, HADES (2015), about a woman stuck in an endless dream, in which she has to cross the five rivers of Hades, and its sequel, TLMEA (2016), about a drug raid that descends down the nine levels of hell, made a splash at the festival circuit and were already a testament to Kopacka's distinct visual style.

Kopacka made his directorial debut in 2021 with the gothic horror film Dawn Breaks Behind the Eyes, which premiered at FrightFest in 2021. The film was a success and won several awards.

In August 2023, Variety announced out of the Locarno Film Festival that Kopacka was developing his next feature film, titled All the World Drops Dead – a co-production between Germany and Spain.

== Filmography ==
- For Those Who Still Exist (essay film – 2014)
- HADES (short film – 2015)
- No One Can Take Your Place (short film – 2015)
- TLMEA (short film – 2016)
- DYLAN (series pilot – 2016)
- HAGER (2020)
- Dawn Breaks Behind the Eyes (2021)
- All the World Drops Dead (upcoming)
