= Dennis Hammer =

American television producer

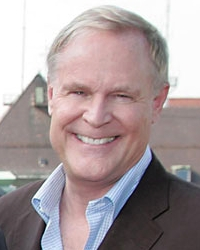

Dennis Hammer is a television producer whose credits include Empire, Colony, Heroes, Crossing Jordan, and Dynasty. Before moving to television, Hammer was a theater publicist working for Gordon Davidson at the Mark Taper Forum and Ahmanson Theater in Los Angeles.

== Career ==
The veteran producer began his career in television as a casting director at Aaron Spelling Productions and eventually became a producer for popular Spelling series such as The Love Boat and Dynasty. He also developed and produced all twenty of the Danielle Steel Television movies for NBC; these became one of the most successful made-for-television franchises in television history. His most recent work being 20thCentury Fox Television’s hit series Empire. Prior to Empire, Dennis produced Colony, Tyrant, and Heroes to name a few. Hammer is Emmy nominated, and the recipient of the BAFTA Award.

== Filmography ==
Year(s)	Title	Network	Role	Description
2016–2020	Empire	Fox	Executive Producer	
2016	Colony	USA	Co-Executive Producer	
2014	Tyrant	Fox	Producer	
2014	Delirium	Fox	Producer	
2012-2013	Touch	Fox	Producer	
2006-2010	Heroes	NBC	Executive Producer	
2001-2007	Crossing Jordan	NBC	Executive Producer	
