= Yalom's Cure =

- Film poster
- Directed by: Sabine Gisiger
- Written by: Sabine Gisiger
- Produced by: Philip Delaquis
- Starring: Irvin D. Yalom
- Cinematography: Helena Vagnières, Matthias Günter, Tim Metzger
- Edited by: Barbara Weber, Andreas Winterstein
- Music by: Balz Bachmann
- Distributed by: Autlook Filmsales GmbH
- Release date: August 9, 2014 (Locarno Festival)
- Running time: 77 minutes
- Countries: Switzerland, United States, France
- Language: English

Yalom's Cure is a 2014 documentary film about the life and work of American psychiatrist and bestseller author Irvin D. Yalom by Swiss director and writer Sabine Gisiger. Yalom invites viewers to think about themselves and their existence.

== Plot ==
Yalom's Cure takes viewers on an existential journey through the many layers of the human psyche. In the film, Irvin D. Yalom reflects on the meaning of life and how to lead a fulfilled life. He offers profound insights into the knowledge he has gained over many years and into his own spiritual life.

Born in 1931, the psychiatrist and author Irvin D. Yalom is seen as one of the most influential psychotherapist in the United States. The film traces his background and career by means of flashbacks using photos and Super 8 footage from his family archive. Re-enactments of therapy sessions illustrate the method of group therapy which Yalom developed together with others. Starting with his main works, including Love's Executioner (1989), The Schopenhauer Cure (2005) and his 1992 novel When Nietzsche Wept, the director accompanies Yalom in his daily life and talks to him about human existence, love, happiness and the fear of death. In these in-depth conversations, the director interweaves Yalom's professional and private life.

The film also observes Yalom in conversation with his wife and together with his children and grandchildren. All four children are divorced, while Yalom and his wife have been a couple since their youth. The family members reflect on the reasons for this and refer to Yalom's ideas on existential psychotherapy.

The film was made for the cinema and has a meditative narrative rhythm and poetic imagery: Yalom is shown cycling, at a family gathering, and cooking. There are also numerous underwater scenes.

== Release ==
Yalom's Cure premiered at the Locarno Film Festival in August 2014 where it was screened out of competition. In October 2014 the film was selected to the São Paulo International Film Festival and at the Mill Valley Film Festival in St Raphael CA.

In more than ten countries the documentary was released in cinemas. In Switzerland it attracted an audience of 50,000, in Germany 90,000 entries. Further starts were, among others, in the United States, Canada, Greece and Spain.

== Critical response ==
Los Angeles Times film critic Michael Rechtshaffen has emphasized the film's meditative approach:

(...) a fittingly meditative documentary portrait of psychotherapist-professor Irvin D. Yalom that offers a candid glimpse into the bestselling author's private life. The film dispenses an intricate fusion of the past and present that informs our own everyday existence.

In her article on the portal Cineuropa, Muriel del Don highlights the film's successful merger of the professional and private image of Yalom:

(...) its power resides in its ability to make seemingly intimate and personal concerns universal. Sabine Gisiger guides us through the life of this extraordinary man with respect and decency: showing the public character but also and especially his deeper inner self, his rich spiritual life. The complexity of this dichotomy between professional image and private life (his role has a husband, father and guide) is artistically conveyed by the Swiss director who succeeds in captivating us, making us almost forget about the present and guiding us in a timeless way.

According to C. L. Illsley from Montreal Rampage, the film accentuates that Yalom himself lives according to his own theories and beliefs formulated in his books:

Yalom's Cure reveals Irwin Yalom to be an interesting and active character. Even in his early 80s the film shows him delivering academic speeches, counseling patients, walking arm in arm with his wife, and zipping around on his bicycle. Clearly Yalom is someone who practices what he preaches and a key element of this is that keeping engaged and busy – both physically and mentally – is vital to maintaining a healthy lifestyle through each phase of life.

== Awards and nominations ==
- 2015: Swiss Film Award, nomination as Best Documentary
- 2015: Swiss Film Award, nomination as Best Score
- 2015: Cultural Department of the City of Zurich, 1. prize for the most successful documentary of the year
