= Alexa Karolinski =

German filmmaker (born 1984)

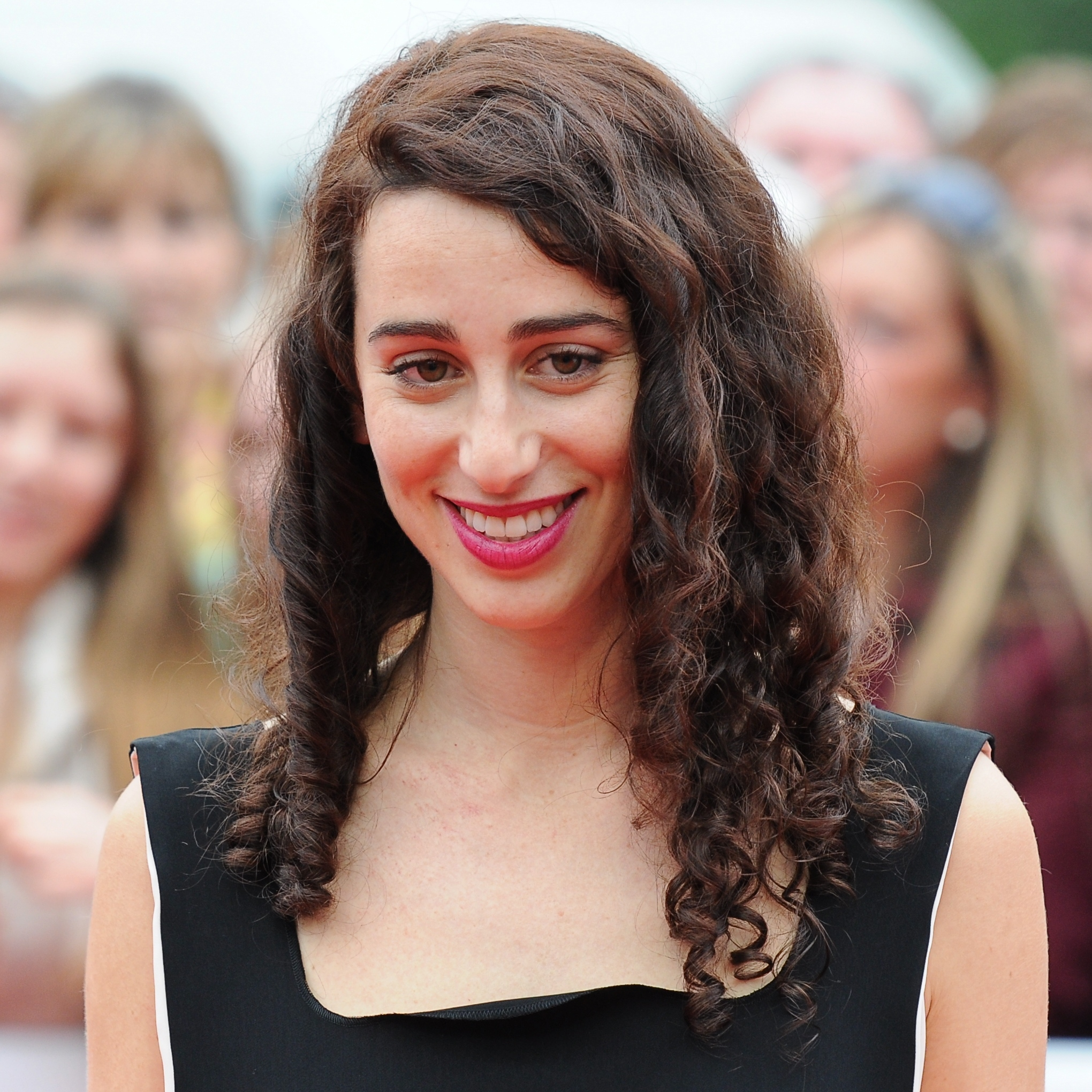
- Karolinski at 2014 Grimme-Preis
- Born: 1984 (age 41–42); West Berlin, West Germany
- Occupation: Filmmaker

Alexa Karolinski (born 1984) is a German writer, director and producer whose work includes music videos, commercials, film and television. She is the creator of the television drama Unorthodox (2020).

== Filmmaking career ==
Alexa received an MFA in Social Documentary Film from The School of Visual Arts, NYC where Karolinski’s break-out film, was her thesis work 'Oma & Bella', which is a documentary about her grandmother (“Oma”) and her grandmother’s best friend (“Bella”), two women with very different personalities united by their shared trauma of Nazi persecution. The film follows the two survivors as they go about their daily routines of cooking, arguing, and discussing their experiences. The film premiered at the Berlin Film Festival, and won Karolinski the prestigious Grimme Prize.

Karolinski’s second feature documentary, Lebenszeichen (Signs of Life), was an essay film about the different ways Jews and gentiles in Germany ritualize their historical burden. It was released in 2018 to great critical acclaim. Der Spiegel, called it “the German-Jewish work of its generation.”

Starting in 2013, Karolinski started her long-running collaboration with the fashion brand Eckhaus Latta. The videos she produced and directed for the LA-based brand have been shown at the Museum of Art and Design, MOCA Los Angeles, MoMA PS1, as well as Galerie Isabella Bortlozzi, in Berlin.

In 2016, Karolinski started her ongoing art-video collaboration with writer/artist Ingo Niermann for their film Army of Love. It premiered at the Berlin Biennale and has since been included in exhibitions at the Centre Pompidou, MACBA, Castello di Rivoli, as well as CCCB and the Wiesbaden Biennale. Their second installment of the series, OCEANO DE AMOR, was part of a three month exhibition Auto Italia gallery in London, and had its world premiere at CPH:DOX in Copenhagen in March 2020 and played on MUBI in 2021.

In 2017, Karolinski directed the film Fashion at War: Crafting the Nazi Brand for Condé Nast's M2M about Hugo Boss his involvement in making Nazi uniforms.

Karolinski and Anna Winger served as co-creators and co-writers of the miniseries Unorthodox, which debuted on March 26, 2020 and is Netflix's first ever Yiddish show.

== Cookbook ==
As an accompaniment to her film Oma & Bella, Karolinski wrote a cookbook with the same name that has sold out of its 3rd edition. The cookbook was released along with the film.

== Early life ==
Karolinski was born to a Canadian mother and German father in West Berlin. She grew up in the city’s small, recovering Jewish community. She now lives between Berlin and Los Angeles.
