= Unorthodox (miniseries) =

2020 German drama web television miniseries

- Genre: Drama
- Created by: Anna Winger; Alexa Karolinski
- Inspired by: Unorthodox: The Scandalous Rejection of My Hasidic Roots by Deborah Feldman
- Written by: Anna Winger; Alexa Karolinski
- Directed by: Maria Schrader
- Starring: Shira Haas; Amit Rahav; Jeff Wilbusch
- Country of origin: Germany
- Original languages: English; Yiddish; German
- No. of episodes: 4

Production
- Executive producers: Anna Winger; Henning Kamm
- Producer: Alexa Karolinski
- Running time: 52–54 minutes
- Production companies: Studio Airlift; Real Film Berlin Gmbh

Original release
- Network: Netflix
- Release: March 26, 2020

Unorthodox is a German drama television miniseries that debuted on Netflix on March 26, 2020. Inspired by Deborah Feldman's 2012 autobiography, Unorthodox: The Scandalous Rejection of My Hasidic Roots, it is the first Netflix series to be primarily in Yiddish. The four-part miniseries was created and written by Anna Winger and Alexa Karolinski, and directed by Maria Schrader.

The series received eight Primetime Emmy Award nominations, including Outstanding Limited Series, Outstanding Lead Actress in a Limited Series (Shira Haas), and Outstanding Writing for a Limited Series (Anna Winger), winning for Outstanding Directing for a Limited Series (Maria Schrader) - the first ever Primetime Emmy for a German production.

== Premise ==
Esty Shapiro, a 19-year-old Jewish woman, is living unhappily in an arranged marriage among the Satmar sect of the ultra-Orthodox community in Williamsburg, Brooklyn, New York City. She runs away to Berlin, where her estranged mother lives, and tries to navigate a secular life, discovering life outside her community and rejecting all of the beliefs she grew up with. Her husband, who learns that she is pregnant, travels to Berlin with his cousin, by order of their rabbi, to try to find her.

== Cast and characters ==
=== Main ===
- Shira Haas as Esther "Esty" Shapiro
- Amit Rahav as Yaakov "Yanky" Shapiro
- Jeff Wilbusch as Moses "Moishe" Lefkovitch

=== Recurring ===
- Alex Reid as Leah Mandelbaum
- Ronit Asheri as Malka Schwartz
- Gera Sandler as Mordechai Schwartz
- Dina Doron as Esty's grandmother ("Bubbe")
- Aaron Altaras as Robert
- Tamar Amit-Joseph as Yael Roubeni
- Aziz Dyab as Salim
- David Mandelbaum as Zeidy
- Delia Mayer as Miriam Shapiro
- Felix Mayr as Mike
- Lili Rosen as Rabbi Yossele
- Safinaz Sattar as Dasia
- Langston Uibel as Axmed
- Isabel Schosnig as Nina Decker
- Laura Beckner as Vivian Dropkin
- Harvey Friedman as Symcha Shapiro
- Lenn Kudrjawizki as Igor
- Yousef "Joe" Sweid as Karim Nuri

== Episodes ==
No.	Title	Directed by	Written by	Original release date
1	"Part 1"	Maria Schrader	Anna Winger	March 26, 2020
On a Sabbath day, 19-year-old Esty Shapiro, an ultra-Orthodox Jewish married woman, flees her home in the Williamsburg, Brooklyn, section of New York City with only a handful of possessions. She takes a plane to Berlin, where her estranged mother lives, but runs away before they can meet after seeing her mother kiss her female partner. At a coffee shop, Esty meets Robert, a young man ordering many coffees. She helps him take coffee to his friends who are waiting at a nearby music conservatory where they all study. Esty sneaks into their rehearsal, and is deeply moved by their music. After the rehearsal, she hears the group announce they are going to the beach, and asks to come along. At the beach, Esty removes her sheitel as she bathes in the water, revealing her real hair. Back in Williamsburg, Esty's husband, Yanky Shapiro, discovers that she is missing, and runs to his family for help. In a flashback, Esty prepares to marry Yanky, and is visited by her mother who gives her German citizenship papers, should she ever need them. Esty goes forward with her wedding.
2	"Part 2"	Maria Schrader	Alexa Karolinski; Anna Winger	March 26, 2020
Esty is discovered sleeping overnight in the conservatory. She is encouraged to apply for a hardship scholarship given to talented refugees and musicians in other difficult circumstances. Esty decides to go ahead as she plays the piano. When her conservatory friends invite her to dinner, they ask her to perform a piece. Esty is heartbroken when one of them, Yael, tells her that, while she is musical, her playing is merely adequate, and nowhere near good enough for the conservatory. She calls home for the first time, but is further distressed when her grandmother hangs up on her without speaking. Yanky and his cousin Moishe fly to Berlin to try to retrieve Esty, and Yanky is stunned by Moishe's worldly ways.
3	"Part 3"	Maria Schrader	Anna Winger; Alexa Karolinski	March 26, 2020
Esty decides to withdraw her application for the conservatory, but the woman processing her application convinces her to continue with it. She goes to a club to see Yael performing, and is spotted by Moishe, who has succeeded in tracking her down. Esty leaves with Robert before Moishe can confront her. When they return to Robert's apartment, Robert and Esty share an intimate encounter. In a flashback, Esty's marriage begins to crumble almost as soon as it starts, as she cannot have sex with Yanky because she finds it painful. She is eventually told that she is suffering from vaginismus. After a particularly angry fight with Yanky, Esty urges him to complete sex with her, despite her horrific pain.
4	"Part 4"	Maria Schrader	Alexa Karolinski; Anna Winger	March 26, 2020
Moishe finally tracks down Esty, and threatens her, telling her she will have nothing if she doesn't return to her husband. In distress, Esty finally contacts her mother, who promises to support her and her child. Esty decides to go through with her audition, switching her discipline from the piano to voice. After her audition, she is approached by Yanky, who begs her to come home with him. Promising to change, Yanky cuts off his payot, but Esty tells him it is too late for them and leaves to start her new life.

== Production ==
The series was inspired by, and is loosely based on, the memoir Unorthodox: The Scandalous Rejection of My Hasidic Roots by Deborah Feldman, who left the Satmar movement, a Hasidic community in New York City. Because Feldman is a public figure, the writers veered from her life in the fictional Berlin sequences, but based the flashbacks on the book. The show has language switching from English to Yiddish to German. Unorthodox is the first Netflix series to be primarily in Yiddish.

The show was written by Anna Winger and Alexa Karolinski, directed by Maria Schrader, and produced by Karolinski. Feldman approached writers Winger and Karolinski to turn her autobiography into a television series. They took on the project in part because the story meshed with several topics of mutual interest, especially the challenges of being Jewish in Germany. Winger said that the story "has a kind of doubling back on history", portraying a Jewish character who escapes the "confines of her own life" by returning "to the source of her community's trauma".

Filming began in New York, then relocated to Berlin, where the production designer built interior sets at CCC Filmstudios that synced with the Brooklyn exteriors. Berlin locations include Potsdamer Platz, which served as the set for the music academy and surroundings, and the Wannsee lake (Großer Wannsee), where, as referenced in the story, the "Final Solution" was planned at a shoreline villa. The music academy in Unorthodox is based on the Barenboim-Said Akademie. Anna Winger told The Guardian: "There's a real music academy called the Barenboim-Said Akademie where Jews and Muslims play classical music together, like a whole utopia. We were inspired by this idea, as the sort of institution that could only begin in Berlin."

For the production and costume designers, the project presented the challenge of creating a period film set in the present day, with the main character gradually transitioning between them. The two-day filming of the wedding was a complex undertaking, involving about a hundred extras that had to accurately depict a nuanced cultural celebration. "The joke on the show was that the men required way more hair and make-up than the women", Winger said. Costume designer Justine Seymour obtained some of the clothes in Williamsburg, but not the costly fur hats, shtreimels, which were made by a Hamburg-based theater company, using fake fur, instead of minks.

An early hire was actor and Yiddish specialist Eli Rosen, who translated the scripts, coached the actors, helped with cultural details, and played the rabbi. The production team took two research trips to the Brooklyn neighborhood of Williamsburg, touring buildings and meeting with the community of Satmar Jews, where part of the story is set. Cast in Germany, Jeff Wilbusch was unique among the four lead actors in being a native Yiddish speaker from the Satmar community (via the Mea Shearim neighborhood of Jerusalem).

== Reception ==
=== Critical response ===
Unorthodox received widespread critical acclaim. The review aggregation website Rotten Tomatoes reported an approval rating of 96%, based on 52 reviews, with an average rating of 8.2/10. The website's critical consensus reads: "Unorthodox adapts its source material with extreme care, crafting a series that is at once intimate and urgent, all centered around Shira Haas' captivating performance." On Metacritic, it has a weighted average score of 85 out of 100, based on 11 critics, indicating "universal acclaim".

=== Accolades ===
Year	Award	Category	Nominee(s)	Result	Ref.
2020	German Television Awards	Best Miniseries	Anna Winger, Maria Schrader, and Rachel Eggebeen	Nominated	
2020	German Television Awards	Best Actress	Shira Haas	Nominated	
2020	German Television Awards	Best Production and Costume Design	Silke Fischer (Production) and Justine Seymour (Costume)	Won	
2020	Primetime Emmy Awards	Outstanding Limited Series	Anna Winger, Henning Kamm, and Alexa Karolinski	Nominated	
2020	Primetime Emmy Awards	Outstanding Lead Actress in a Limited Series or Movie	Shira Haas	Nominated	
2020	Primetime Emmy Awards	Outstanding Writing for a Limited Series, Movie, or Dramatic Special	Anna Winger (for "Part 1")	Nominated	
2020	Primetime Emmy Awards	Outstanding Directing for a Limited Series, Movie, or Dramatic Special	Maria Schrader	Won	
2020	Primetime Creative Arts Emmy Awards	Outstanding Casting for a Limited Series, Movie, or Special	Esther Kling, Vicki Thomson, Maria Rölcke, and Cornelia Mareth	Nominated	
2020	Primetime Creative Arts Emmy Awards	Outstanding Contemporary Costumes	Justine Seymour, Simone Kreska, and Barbara Schramm (for "Part 2")	Nominated	
2020	Primetime Creative Arts Emmy Awards	Outstanding Music Composition for a Limited Series, Movie, or Special (Original Dramatic Score)	Antonio Gambale (for "Part 1")	Nominated	
2020	Primetime Creative Arts Emmy Awards	Outstanding Original Main Title Theme Music	Antonio Gambale	Nominated	
2020	APRA Screen Music Awards	Best Music for a Mini-Series or Telemovie	Antonio Gambale	Won	
2020	APRA Screen Music Awards	Best Television Theme	Antonio Gambale	Won	
2021	British Academy Television Awards	Best International Programme	Unorthodox	Nominated	
2021	Costume Designers Guild Awards	Excellence in Contemporary Television	Justine Seymour (for "Part 2")	Nominated	
2021	Critics' Choice Television Awards	Best Limited Series	Unorthodox	Nominated	
2021	Critics' Choice Television Awards	Best Actress in a Limited Series or TV Movie	Shira Haas	Nominated	
2021	Golden Globe Awards	Best Limited Series or Television Film	Unorthodox	Nominated	
2021	Golden Globe Awards	Best Actress – Limited Series or Television Film	Shira Haas	Nominated	
2021	Golden Reel Awards	Outstanding Achievement in Sound Editing – Single Presentation	Daniel Iribarren, Toby Bilz, Sebastian Morsch, Paul Rischer, Adrian Baumeister, Illia Popel, Dmytro Kniazhechenko, and Victor Shcheglov (for "Part 1")	Nominated	
2021	Gotham Independent Film Awards	Breakthrough Series – Long Form	Anna Winger, Alexa Karolinski, and Henning Kamm	Nominated	
2021	Independent Spirit Awards	Best New Scripted Series	Anna Winger, Alexa Karolinski, and Henning Kamm	Nominated	
2021	Independent Spirit Awards	Best Male Performance in a New Scripted Series	Amit Rahav	Won	
2021	Independent Spirit Awards	Best Female Performance in a New Scripted Series	Shira Haas	Won	
2021	Producers Guild of America Awards	David L. Wolper Award for Outstanding Producer of Limited Series Television	Anna Winger, Alexa Karolinksi, and Henning Kamm	Nominated	
2021	Satellite Awards	Best Miniseries & Limited Series	Unorthodox	Nominated	
2021	Satellite Awards	Best Actress in a Miniseries or TV Film	Shira Haas	Nominated	
2021	Satellite Awards	Best Supporting Actor in a Series, Miniseries, or Television Film	Jeff Wilbusch	Won	

== Making Unorthodox documentary ==
Netflix released a 20-minute documentary, Making Unorthodox, that chronicles the creative process and filming of the miniseries, and discussed the differences between the book and the TV show.

== See also ==
- Shtisel (2013-2021 TV series)
- Shttl (2023 film)
- Menashe (2017 film)
- One of Us (2017 film)
- Leaving the Fold (2008 documentary film)
- Let There Be Light (2007 film)
- Off the derech
