= Female Pleasure =

#Female Pleasure
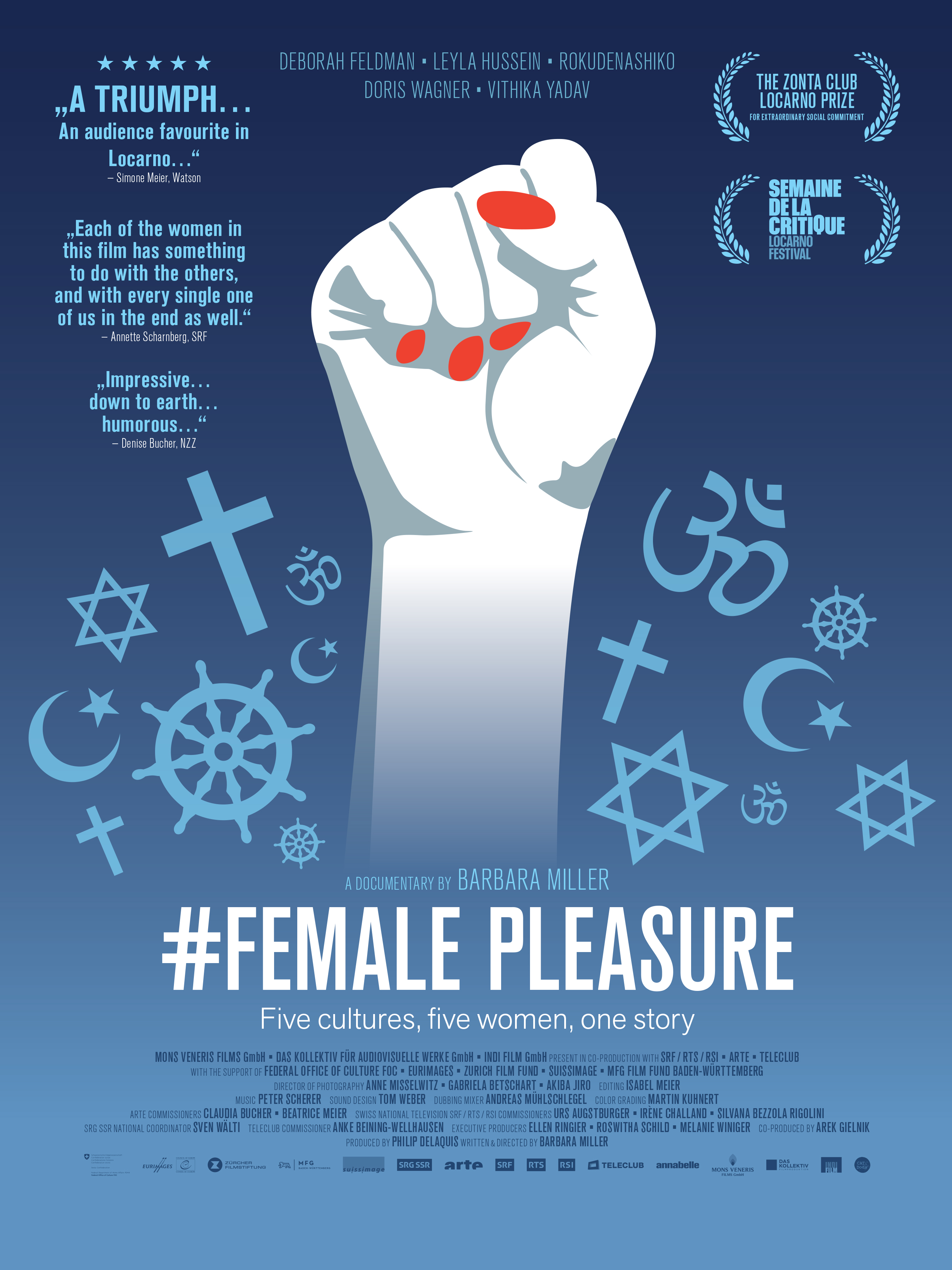
- #Female Pleasure
- Directed by: Barbara Miller
- Produced by: Philip Delaquis
- Starring: Deborah Feldman; Leyla Hussein; Rokudenashiko; Doris Wagner; Vithika Yadav
- Music by: Peter Scherer
- Distributed by: X Verleih AG (through Warner Bros.)
- Release date: August 5, 2018 (Locarno Film Festival)
- Running time: 97 minutes
- Countries: Switzerland, Germany
- Languages: German, English, French, Japanese

#Female Pleasure is a 2018 Swiss and German documentary film directed by Swiss director Barbara Miller. The film explores female sexuality in the 21st century around the globe.

== Content ==
The film argues for the liberation of female sexuality in equal, sensual relationships between the sexes in the 21st century. It accompanies five women from different cultural backgrounds who stand up against the repression of female sexuality in their cultural and religious communities. The film reveals similarities among the different protagonists, and shows their struggle for self-determined sexuality, and "each woman, all invaluable in terms of the work they are doing, frame their stories in different ways", as Jordan Julian points out in her article in The Daily Beast: The US-American author Deborah Feldman left the New York City Hasidic community; the Somali psychotherapist Leyla Hussein had to undergo genital mutilation as a child, and fights against this practice; Japanese manga artist Rokudenashiko was arrested several times because of her work featuring female genitalia; Bavarian scholar Doris Reisinger, a former nun, reported publicly on the experiences of abuse in a spiritual community in Rome; and Vithika Yadav works as a sex education publisher in Delhi.

== Release ==
The film premiered on August 5, 2018, at the International Film Festival Locarno in the Semaine de la Critique. The film's release was on November 8, 2018, in Germany and Austria, and November 15 in Switzerland. In April 2019, the North American premiere followed at the Hot Docs Canadian International Documentary Festival. On October 18, 2019, was the film's U.S. theatrical release.

== Background ==
The production of the film was led by Mons Veneris Films GmbH, Zurich, Das Kollektiv für audiovisuelle Werke GmbH, Zurich, and Indi Film GmbH, Stuttgart, in a co-production with SRG SSR, Arte, SRF, RTS, and RSI. The film was directed by Barbara Miller.

== Reception ==
=== Box office ===
In Switzerland, the film had the biggest box office of all Swiss documentaries of the year 2018. In Germany, #Female Pleasure opened as the most successful film of the weekend, and it was in the Top 4 of 2018. According to the German Television, the film was one of the most relevant documentaries of the year 2018.

=== Critical response ===
At the date of the theatrical release in the U.S., the Alliance of Women Film Journalists labeled the documentary as the movie of the week, because it "shows us why that fight is so important — and how it connects women across distances both geographical and cultural". Even if the five women are disparate in terms of their stories and experiences, "Miller underlines the fact that women's struggle to embrace and own their sexuality in a world dominated by misogyny is universal", wrote Betsy Bozdeck.

As #Female Pleasure focuses on patriarchal constraints on women's sexuality, film critics located the film as a contribution to the #MeToo debate. John DeFore from The Hollywood Reporter concluded that this documentary "reminds us that cultures around the world and throughout time have used sexual mores to assert control over women". Martin Kudlac wrote on Screen Anarchy: "At the beginning of 21st century, gender and cultural stereotypes undergo major re-assessment, while women and their voices in the society are being empowered and heart loud and clear. (...) Miller adds her contribution to the hottest debate through the eyes of five brave women willing to act and testify." He continued that Miller did not attack religions, though the film made "an informed point on inherent sexism and misogyny frequently exerted on behalf or under the pretense of a higher being while using women body as a key".

Annette Scharnberg from Swiss Radio and Television underlined the importance of the film for mutual understanding between the sexes: "One can only hope that those individuals who are upset over the supposed whining about equality, MeToo, and gender issues will be better able to comprehend, thanks to films like #Female Pleasure, why there is no other alternative than to fight back against this culture of oppression." She said that Miller demonstrated how discrimination, misogyny, and sexualized violence were connected around the world to patriarchal structures, legitimized by sacred texts, whether those of Christians, Jews, Muslims, Buddhists, or Hindus. Similar Muriel Del Don on Cineuropa.org: "What this documentary seems to want to tell us is that it's never too late to assert our right to exist. Women can and must assert their sexuality, not for the sake of duty, but in the name of pleasure, because this sexuality fast becomes a weapon with which to fight a patriarchy-prison of grotesque proportions."

Writing for the Los Angeles Times, Maria Garcia estimated the objectivity and universality of the topic: Each of the protagonists "provides an insider view of the unique brand of misogyny that informs their respective cultures. All are survivors of rape or other forms of sexual assault. The issues they confront are not new; yet, the stories of their radicalization are engaging, and Miller's deft editing and objective approach result in a surprisingly intimate and life-affirming film."

Malin Jörnvi from FF2 Media identifies two further important aspects of the film. First, the role of the religion: "the documentary take[s] an explicit stance when it comes to religion: All the narratives involve biting critique against the treatment of women and women bodies within organized human faith." And second, a "powerful tool for learning. Because, not only does the documentary present the responsibility we have as global citizens to educate ourselves in the contemporary state of the world, it also highlights the responsibility we have to be critical to the inevitably one-dimensional perspective enforced by the use of camera."

=== Awards(selection) ===
The film received several awards and nominations: After the Zonta Prize at the Critics Week at the Locarno Festival 2018, the film won the Special Prize of the Interreligious Jury at the International Leipzig Festival for Documentary and Animated Film. For the Swiss Film Award 2019, #Female Pleasure was nominated in the three categories Best Documentary Film, Best Film Score, Best Film Editing; in Austria, it won a Romy Award in the category Best Cinema Documentary. In 2019, the film received the Amnesty International Award at the Thessaloniki Documentary Festival, and the Audience Award at Millennium Docs Against Gravity in Warsaw.
