= Deborah Feldman =

American-German writer, wrote the 2012 autobiography Unorthodox

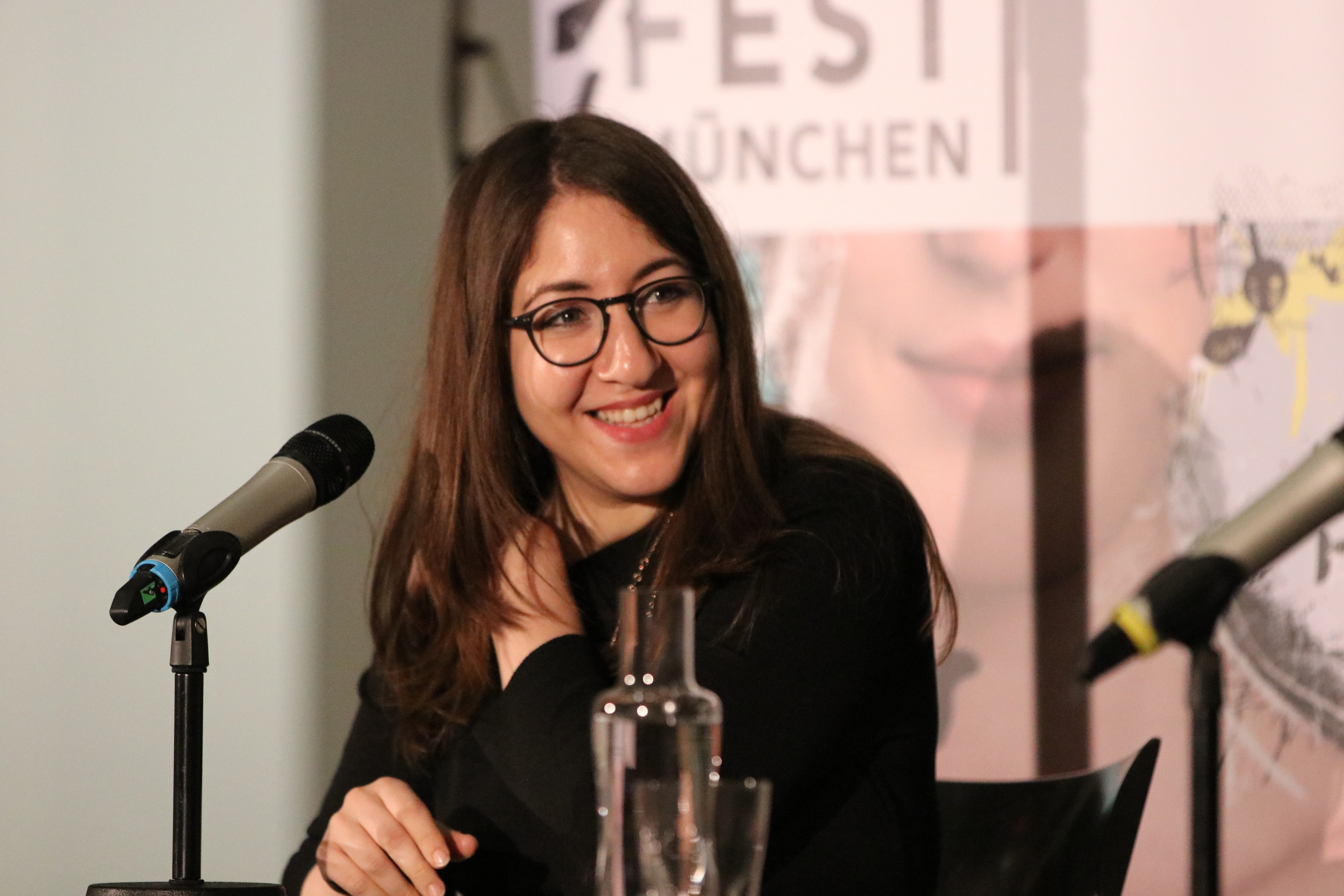
- Feldman in 2017
- Born: August 17, 1986 (age 40); New York City, U.S.
- Occupation: Author
- Notable work: Unorthodox: The Scandalous Rejection of My Hasidic Roots
- Children: 1
- Website: deborahfeldman.com

Deborah Feldman is an American-German writer living in Berlin. Her 2012 autobiography, Unorthodox: The Scandalous Rejection of My Hasidic Roots, tells the story of her escape from a Hasidic Jewish community in Brooklyn, New York, and was the basis of the 2020 Netflix miniseries Unorthodox.

== Early life ==
Feldman grew up as a member of the Hasidic Satmar group in Williamsburg, Brooklyn, New York City. She has written that her father was mentally impaired, and that her paternal family had arranged a marriage for him to her mother, whom Feldman described as an intelligent woman who was an outsider to the community because she was of German Jewish origin. Her mother was born in Manchester to refugees from Germany, and upon researching her mother's family, Feldman discovered that one of her mother's grandfathers was of non-Jewish (Catholic) German ancestry on his father's side and had attempted to integrate fully into Gentile society. She was raised by her grandparents, both Holocaust survivors, after her mother left the community and came out as lesbian, and her mentally impaired father was unable to raise her on his own. Like all children in the community, Feldman was raised to be pious, spoke Yiddish, and was prohibited from going to the public library. Denied a typical American education, she hid books prohibited by the community under her bed. She entered an arranged marriage at the age of 17, and became a mother at 19.

== Career ==
Feldman started blogging, and in 2012, she published her autobiography, Unorthodox: The Scandalous Rejection of My Hasidic Roots, which became a bestseller and was translated into 30 languages, into Hebrew in 2013. In 2014, she published Exodus: A Memoir. Her books have been translated into German and well received by German critics, which led to her appearing on various talk shows on German TV.

In 2017, she published Überbitten (roughly translated as "Reconcile"), a German-language expanded version of Exodus, which she wrote in collaboration with publisher Christian Ruzicska. Feldman said that writing in German was freeing because she could use her broader vocabulary of Yiddish terms that a German readership could understand. She characterized her writing style as old-fashioned, owing to the 18th-century version of Yiddish she grew up with. Überbitten was well received. The Swiss-German newspaper Neue Zürcher Zeitung called the book "a report on the long journey to the self, a literary survival guide, and a formidable philosophical-analytic confrontation with one's own history".

Feldman is featured in Barbara Miller's 2018 Swiss-German documentary #Female Pleasure as the critic of Jewish patriarchy. The 2020 Netflix original miniseries Unorthodox is loosely based on her autobiography. Netflix also produced a documentary, Making Unorthodox, that chronicles the creative process and filming, and discussed the differences between the book and the TV series.

In November 2023, Feldman appeared along with German vice-chancellor Robert Habeck on the talk show Markus Lanz, where they debated the German response to the Gaza war. Feldman said that the only lesson from the Holocaust must be the unconditional defense of human rights for all. Feldman criticized the postponed award ceremony for the Palestinian author Adania Shibli and her novel Minor Detail at the Frankfurt Book Fair 2023 and signed the open letter from 1200 intellectuals against it.

== Personal life ==
In 2014, Feldman moved to Berlin, settling in the Neukölln district, where she continued to work as a writer. Her first visit to the city had been deeply unsettling, given her family history and Berlin's Nazi past. On her second visit, the city impressed her with its openness, its welcoming of refugees, and its many bookstores. After her first summer living there, she called the city her "secret paradise", and she resolved to stay. She quickly adapted to speaking and writing in German, due to its similarity with Yiddish, a West Germanic language. Feldman has said that "one of the biggest draws of being in Germany is the fact that the language is so similar to my mother language [Yiddish] that I feel a sense of familiarity, and that is powerful".

After moving to Germany, Feldman became a German citizen in 2017; when asked by Arnon Grunberg whether she identifies as a German, she affirmed that "yes, I'm German". She lives in Berlin with her German boyfriend, who is not Jewish. Feldman has said that "I see Berlin as the capital of the West; to me, it's a city where everyone can find a home, where everyone can find freedom, it's the last bastion against oppression". In a 2026 appearance on the Al Jazeera program "Head to Head", Feldman described herself as a progressive and an anti-Zionist Jew.

=== Separation from Hasidic community ===
Feldman said that the birth of her son was a turning point regarding staying in the Hasidic community: "I saw my future all mapped out... I freaked out at the knowledge that I have the responsibility and guilt of putting everything I saw as my oppression into an innocent person." In 2006, she and her husband moved out of Williamsburg, and, telling her husband she wanted to take business courses to supplement their income, she began to study literature at Sarah Lawrence College in Bronxville.

Once in school, she "made a beeline" for a college degree to connect with the outside world. She began to speak out and "open my mind". She also began to wear jeans and high heels, breaking the strict Hasidic dress code. In 2006, she departed with her son, leaving her husband and cutting all ties with the Hasidic community. She lived for two months with friends, and consulted with lawyers to make sure she did not lose custody of her son. As of 2012, Feldman had not seen or spoken to any of her family since her departure in 2006.

Despite her differences with the Hasidic community, Feldman has said: "I am proud of being Jewish, because I think that's where my indomitable spirit comes from."

== Criticism ==
Members of the Hasidic community have criticized Feldman, including in an anonymous blog titled "Deborah Feldman Exposed", which was dedicated to "exposing the lies and fabrications" in her story. Jesse Kornbluth examined this criticism in a pair of articles in the Huffington Post which concluded, "There are claims in this book that Hasids have disputed. I can't tell what's true. But I'm sure of one thing: Men who can't live equally with women aren't worth living with. No doubt girls all over Brooklyn are buying this book, hiding it under their mattresses, reading it after lights out—and contemplating, perhaps for the first time, their own escape." Other journalists also investigated some of the incidents described in Feldman's memoir and found a number of exaggerations or discrepancies, including her account of her schooling, her relationships with various family members, and her description of an alleged murder and its supposed coverup by Haredi authorities. In response to these criticisms, Feldman noted that the book carried a disclaimer stating that certain events had been compressed, consolidated or reordered. Her book Exodus has drawn similar criticisms regarding the veracity of certain events.

== Bibliography ==
- Unorthodox: The Scandalous Rejection of My Hasidic Roots. Simon & Schuster, October 2, 2012; ISBN 978-1439187012
- Exodus: A Memoir. Blue Rider Press, March 25, 2014; ISBN 978-0399162770
- Überbitten. Übersetzung Christian Ruzicska. Secession Verlag für Literatur, Zürich 2017, ISBN 978-3-906910-00-0
- Judenfetisch. Luchterhand Verlag, München 2023, ISBN 978-3-630-87751-8

== See also ==
- One of Us (2017 film)
- Off the derech
