= The Little Drummer Girl (TV series) =

2018 television spy miniseries

- Genre: Drama; Espionage; Spy thriller
- Based on: The Little Drummer Girl by John le Carré
- Written by: Michael Lesslie; Claire Wilson
- Directed by: Park Chan-wook
- Starring: Michael Shannon; Alexander Skarsgård; Florence Pugh; Michael Moshonov; Simona Brown; Clare Holman; Charles Dance
- Music by: Jo Yeong-wook
- Countries of origin: United Kingdom; United States
- Original language: English
- No. of series: 1
- No. of episodes: 6

Production
- Executive producers: Stephen Cornwell; Simon Cornwell; Joseph Tsai; Park Chan-wook; Michael Lesslie; John le Carré; Arthur Wang; Wonjo Jeong
- Producer: Laura Hastings-Smith
- Production locations: London; Athens; Prague
- Cinematography: Kim Woo-hyung
- Editors: Fiona DeSouza; Michael Harrowes; Justine Wright
- Production companies: BBC Studios; AMC Networks; The Ink Factory; 127 Wall Productions

Original release
- Network: BBC One
- Release: 28 October – 2 December 2018

The Little Drummer Girl is an espionage drama television series based on the 1983 novel of the same name by John le Carré. The six-episode series first aired on BBC One in the United Kingdom on 28 October 2018 and on AMC in the United States during November 2018. A Director's Cut was released in 2019.

== Premise ==
In 1979, an aspiring English actress is recruited by Mossad to infiltrate and stop a Palestinian group that is plotting terrorism in London and elsewhere in Europe.

== Cast ==
- Michael Shannon as Martin Kurtz, an Israeli spymaster working in a clandestine agency.
- Florence Pugh as Charmian "Charlie" Ross, a radical left-wing English actress in her early 20s who in 1979 is sucked into espionage.
- Alexander Skarsgård as Gadi Becker, a mysterious man whom Charlie encounters on holiday in Greece and who becomes her holiday fling. He is then revealed as an Israeli intelligence officer.
- Michael Moshonov as Shimon Litvak, a key Israeli member of Kurtz's team.
- Simona Brown as Rachel, a charismatic young operative working in Kurtz's team.
- Jeff Wilbusch as Anton Mesterbein, a Swiss lawyer and an associate of Michel.
- Clare Holman as Miss Bach, an Englishwoman who is a key member of Kurtz's Munich team.
- Daniel Litman as Daniel, an operative working in Kurtz's team.
- Kate Sumpter as Rose, an operative working with Kurtz's team who befriends Charlie in Greece.
- Gennady Fleyscher as Schwilli, an elderly forger who is a key member of Kurtz's Munich team.
- Alessandro Piavani as Rossino, an Italian terrorist working with the Palestinians.
- Charif Ghattas as Khalil Al Khadar, a Palestinian terrorist leader.
- Amir Khoury as Michel, Khalil's youngest brother, who runs his brother's terror network in Europe.
- Charles Dance as Commander Picton, a British secret service official.
- Alexander Beyer as Dr Paul Alexis, a German police bureaucrat and ally of Kurtz.
- Lubna Azabal as Fatmeh, sister of Khalil and Michel.
- Max Irons as Al, Charlie's on and off boyfriend, a self-righteously political and big-headed actor.
- Katharina Schüttler as Helga, a radical left-wing revolutionary who helps Michel recruit disillusioned European women into his network.
- Adel Bencherif as Tayeh, the commander of a Palestinian terrorist camp.
- Bethany Muir as Sophie, an associate of Michel.
- Iben Akerlie as Anna Witgen, Michel's girlfriend and accomplice.
- Mark Stanley as Arthur A. Halloran, an unstable American trainee in the Palestinian camp who helps to train other foreign volunteers to become bombers.
- Ricki Hayut as Professor Irene Minkel, a liberal Israeli academic and peace campaigner who is targeted for assassination.
- John le Carré has a cameo role as a waiter (in episode 3).

== Episodes ==
No.	Title	Directed by	Written by	Original release date	US air date	UK viewers (millions)	US viewers (millions)
1	"Episode 1"	Park Chan-wook	Michael Lesslie	28 October 2018	19 November 2018	8.17	0.40
In 1979 West Germany, the Palestinian militant Michel and his Swedish accomplice and girlfriend Anna Witgen kill the eight-year-old son of an Israeli diplomat target with a semtex bomb. Senior Mossad spy Martin Kurtz is dispatched to Europe to hunt down and eliminate the Palestinian terror cell, which is led by Michel's wily older brother Khalil. Through interviews with the German police and eyewitnesses, Kurtz deduces that Michel romantically entices idealistic but vulnerable young European women whom he grooms to help carry out attacks. He decides to play Michel at his own game by recruiting their own girl to get to Khalil. Under Kurtz's orders, a Mossad team led by Rachel, posing as a tourist, kidnap Michel on the Greek-Turkish border while he is smuggling semtex in his red Mercedes-Benz W123. Meanwhile, left-wing English stage actress Charmian "Charlie" Ross and her troupe tour Greece as part of a corporate "charity job." While Charlie and her fellow actors are visiting a beach, she takes an interest in a mysterious handsome man, who is actually an undercover Mossad agent named Gadi Becker. Gadi has earmarked Charlie for Kurtz's plan. After taking Charlie on a date that includes the Parthenon, Gadi introduces her to his Mossad team including Martin.
2	"Episode 2"	Park Chan-wook	Michael Lesslie	4 November 2018	19 November 2018	5.82	0.40
In Athens, Martin subjects Charlie to an "audition", asking questions about her past. When Charlie convincingly lies about her family background, Martin decides they can use her acting talents to infiltrate and eliminate Khalil's terror network. He reveals that they know she had attended a lecture given by Michel and meetings held by radical political groups proscribed by the British government. Meanwhile, the captive Michel is held at a Mossad safehouse in Munich where his Mossad captors, led by Martin's lieutenant Shimon, trick him into believing he is in an Israeli prison. Using a combination of drugs and psychological pressure, including a faked letter from Michel's sister Fatmeh and a faked photo of a captive Khalil, Shimon's team discover that Michel was supposed to deliver the semtex shipment to Salzburg in Austria. Back in Greece, Gadi coaches Charlie into posing as one of Michel's girlfriends. As part of the training, Gadi role-plays as Michel to create a convincing backstory of Charlie's fake relationship with him. Charlie exacts a promise from Gadi to tell her more about himself in return for her work as a spy.
3	"Episode 3"	Park Chan-wook	Claire Wilson	11 November 2018	20 November 2018	N/A	0.23
As part of her rookie mission, Charlie is tasked with smuggling the semtex inside Michel's red Mercedes through Yugoslavia and into Austria. Gadi and the rest of the team monitor Charlie's movements from a safe distance. Meanwhile, Shimon's Munich team discovers that Michel has lied about the drop-off point. Shimon breaks Michel by revealing that his imprisonment was a set-up and secures the true drop-off zone: an Austrian town called Kleinalm. After being informed by Gadi about the change in destination, Charlie arrives in Kleinalm where she parks the car in the town square. Michel's girlfriend Anna collects the vehicle, but is intercepted and captured by Mossad agents. At first, Charlie enjoys the thrill of the mission but after arriving at the Munich safe house, is horrified by how the drugged-up Michel is treated. Nevertheless, she continues with the mission after Gadi shows her the memorial of the 1972 Munich Olympics massacre. She writes fake love letters to Michel to perpetuate the ruse that she is one of his many lovers. Charlie then returns to London to await contact with Khalil's local associates. Back in Munich, the Mossad team eliminate Michel and Anna in a staged motor accident.
4	"Episode 4"	Park Chan-wook	Michael Lesslie	18 November 2018	20 November 2018	N/A	0.23
Back in London, Charlie continues her spy training under the tutelage of Gadi, who outfits her with a transmitter. Charlie is eventually contacted by Michel's associates including lawyer Anton (Jeff Wilbusch) and Helga (Katharina Schüttler). While meeting with them in a caravan, she first learns of the deaths of Michel and Anna. Her grief-stricken and angry reaction to Michel's death convinces Anton and Helga that she was in love with Michel and is also sympathetic to the Palestinian cause. While initially shocked about Michel's killing, Charlie develops romantic feelings for Gadi. Later, Helga and her associates kidnap Charlie and smuggle her to Lebanon where she meets Michel's sister Fatmeh and Tayeh, the commander of a Palestinian militant camp. Charlie manages to convince Fatmeh that she was romantically involved with her brother. While Martin is pleased with the progress of the mission, Gadi is concerned about Charlie's well-being due to his feelings for her.
5	"Episode 5"	Park Chan-wook	Claire Wilson	25 November 2018	21 November 2018	N/A	0.30
In Lebanon, Charlie is taken to the Palestinian militant camp with other foreign volunteers where she trains to become a bomber. A disillusioned American recruit named Arthur accuses her of spying but she turns the tables on him, and he is shot dead by guards as he flees. Charlie grows closer to Fatmeh who introduces her to more friends outside the camp. After an Israeli journalist and his family are assassinated by Palestinian terrorists in Lyon, the Israeli Air Force bombs the Palestinian camps in Lebanon, witnessed by Charlie. Back in London, Martin's Mossad team discover that Khalil and his team are planning to assassinate liberal Israeli academic Irene Minkel, who is visiting London Polytechnic to give a lecture. Having gained Fatmeh and the militants' trust, Charlie is given the mission of assassinating Minkel. Returning to London, Charlie passes the suitcase carrying the bomb to the Mossad team only for them to discover that it is a decoy. Later, Charlie is taken to meet Khalil, the cell's mastermind.
6	"Episode 6"	Park Chan-wook	Michael Lesslie	2 December 2018	21 November 2018	N/A	0.30
Charlie romantically ingratiates herself with Khalil, gaining his trust; Martin realises Khalil is more useful alive, allowing him to rise in the Palestinian hierarchy and have access to his thinking and plans through Charlie. She delivers the suitcase bomb to her Mossad handlers who are working with British intelligence led by Commander Picton. The Israeli and British police services stage a fake explosion and spread disinformation that Professor Minkel was killed. Under orders from her Mossad handlers, Charlie returns to Khalil, claiming the mission was a success. The two make love and share a bed. The next morning, Khalil grows suspicious and interrogates Charlie into confessing her deception. He inadvertently releases a distress code that Mossad gave Charlie, prompting Gadi to intervene and shoot Khalil dead, leaving Charlie distraught over her feelings for Khalil. Mossad operatives track down and kill Khalil’s European associates including Anton and Helga, eliminating the cell's last remnants, while Tayeh's camp is destroyed in an airstrike. Though conflicted about her role in Martin's plan, Charlie is rehabilitated in an Israeli hospital. She later meets up with Gadi in Germany to begin a new life.

== Production ==
In November 2017, following the success of The Night Manager, The Ink Factory, BBC One, and AMC announced they were reuniting for a 6-part co-production of Le Carré's Little Drummer Girl. Korean Director Park Chan-Wook was announced to be helming the series and Florence Pugh was signed on to star.

Park, who had been a fan of le Carré since high school, was initially reluctant to read the novel as he was "fond of the cat-and-mouse spy novels set in the Cold War, during the conflict between the capitalist and communist worlds. Since The Little Drummer Girl is a story about Israel and Palestine, I wasn’t that excited about it". Park's wife however convinced him to read it and he quickly became interested in adapting the material. At the 2016 Cannes Film Festival, Park met with the producers who held the rights to the novel and expressed his interest in the project.

It wasn't Park's first foray into the world of Le Carré, as he had previously considering directing an adaption of Tinker Tailor Soldier Spy. Park ultimately decided against pursuing the project as he was worried about his "ability to adapt it without damaging the original" and "how to satisfy both people who watched the original and those who didn’t".

Shortly after the production was announced, Alexander Skarsgård was cast in the role of Becker. Michael Shannon was cast as Kurtz the following January.

Principal photography began on the 8 February 2018. The Production was largely based out of London, Greece and The Czech Republic.

The Production was initially denied permits to shoot at the Temple of Poseidon in Cape Sounion. The Central Archaeological Council deemed that the production's shooting day would close the site for visitors for too many hours and the team was too large. The decision caused an adverse reaction from the Greek government who said the move went against their plan for the country to be "film-friendly". However, the filming permit was later approved after the production applied for a half day shooting block with a slightly reduced crew.

When developing the series' stylings, Park was aware that audiences didn't see many films or shows set in the late 1970s. Park stated his vision was to have a "livelier look, more vivid", in an attempt to avoid making "it look too dark or dull or go for a desaturated look".

Production wrapped shooting in Greece after 24 days in early June, 2018.

== Release ==
The six-episode series first aired on BBC One in the United Kingdom on 28 October 2018 and on AMC in the United States during November 2018.

Park expressed disappointment that more cinemas weren't interested in screening the miniseries, after seeing the initial two episodes screened at London Film Festival "It looked so good on the big screen" Park said, "it made me sad that people would have to watch it on their televisions and smartphones. I made up my mind that, if I tackled this kind of project again, it would have to be something worth giving up a theater release.”

In March 2019, a Director’s Cut version of the series was uploaded on Korean streaming platform Watcha Play. Park had continued editing the project for two months after the show finished airing on TV. Several changes were made to bring the series more into line with Park's vision, including reversals to content restrictions imposed by international networks and fixing scenes where editing had been rushed.

In November 2022, South Korean Blu-Ray label Plain Archive released a steelbook and collector's edition of the Director's Cut on 4K and HD Blu-ray. The series sold out during pre-orders.

== Reception ==
On review aggregator website Rotten Tomatoes, the series holds an approval rating of 95% based on 76 reviews, with an average rating of 7.8/10. The critics' consensus reads "The Little Drummer Girl marches to a steady beat of assured plotting, extraordinary art direction, and a uniformly terrific cast that makes the show's smolderingly slow burn pace bearable." On Metacritic, it has a weighted average score of 75 out of 100 based on 18 reviews, signifying "generally favorable reviews".

Richard Lawson of Vanity Fair praised Florence Pugh's acting but criticized elements of the story. Alan Sepinwell of Rolling Stone awarded The Little Drummer Girl 3.5 out of four stars, praising the acting and lush presentation but criticizing what he regarded as the show's "convoluted" story. He observed that it followed the formula of the critically acclaimed The Night Manager television series, an adaptation of another one of Le Carré's novels. Judy Berman, reviewing for TIME, praised the TV series for its suspense, exploring moral dilemmas and the legacy of British foreign policy in the Middle East, and for having nuanced characters on both sides.

Troy Patterson of The New Yorker described the series as a "subtly nutty geopolitical thriller distilled to an exercise in psychological suspense". He also praised Florence Pugh, Alexander Skarsgård, and Michael Shannon's performances as the main protagonists Charlie Ross, Gadi Becker, and Martin Kurtz. Matt Zoller Seitz of Vulture described the series as "a lavishly produced, intelligent, tasteful mixed bag, more interesting to think about than to watch." Jesse Schedeen of IGN awarded the series 8.2 out of 10, praising Pugh's "mesmerizing" performance and Park Chan-Wook's strong directorial vision for overcoming its storytelling flaws.
