= Dawn Breaks Behind the Eyes =

2021 German psychedelic horror film

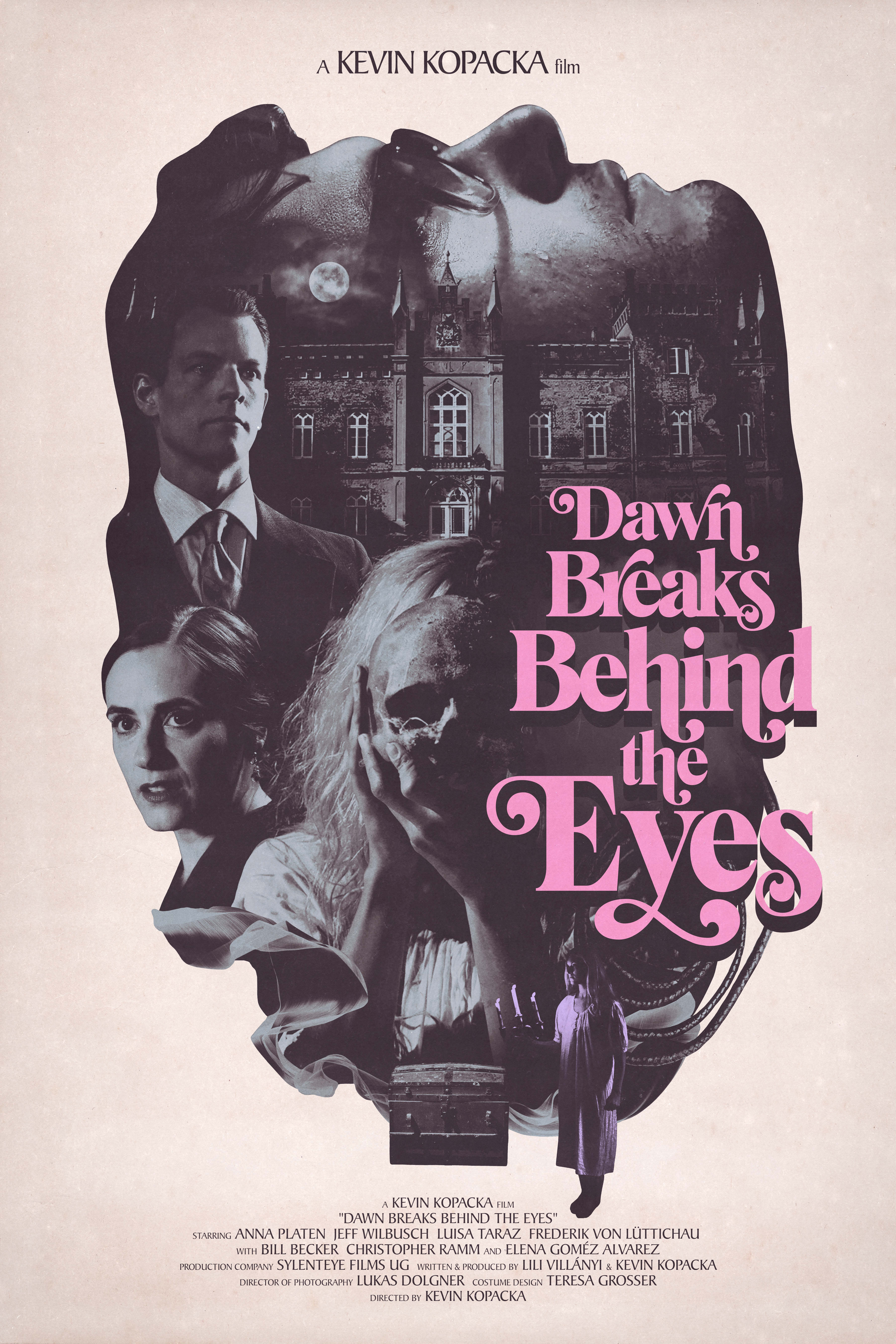
- Release poster
- Directed by: Kevin Kopacka
- Written by: Kevin Kopacka, Lili Villányi
- Produced by: Kevin Kopacka; Lili Villányi
- Starring: Anna Platen; Jeff Wilbusch; Frederik von Lüttichau; Luisa Taraz
- Cinematography: Lukas Dolgner
- Edited by: Kevin Kopacka
- Music by: Kevin Kopacka; Jens Hecht; Liquid Brain Orchestra
- Production company: SYLENTEYE Films
- Distributed by: MPI Media Group Dark Sky Films
- Release dates: August 28, 2021 (FrightFest); June 24, 2022 (United States)
- Running time: 74 minutes
- Country: Germany
- Language: German

Dawn Breaks Behind the Eyes (German: Hinter den Augen die Dämmerung) is a 2021 German mystery horror film directed by Kevin Kopacka and starring Anna Platen, Jeff Wilbusch, Luisa Taraz and Frederik von Lüttichau. It pays homage to European Gothic Horror and psychedelic films of the 1960s and 1970s. It premiered at FrightFest 2021 in London.

== Plot ==
Dieter and Margot Menliff, in an unhappy marriage, visit an old castle that Margot has just inherited. When they arrive, Dieter explores the basement, while Margot examines the rest of the castle. Dieter sees something in the cellar that causes him to drop his keys and flee. Margot has a vision in a dusty mirror. Halfway through the film, a second couple, Eva Ziehnagel and Gregor Grause, is introduced.

== Cast ==
- Anna Platen as Eva Ziehnagel
- Jeff Wilbusch as Gregor Grause
- Frederik von Lüttichau as Dieter Menliff & Klaus Moltke
- Luisa Taraz as Margot Menliff & Lilith Tarenbach

== Release ==
The film had its theatrical world premiere at FrightFest in London, England on 28 August 2021. It was additionally shown at numerous festivals including Panic Fest in the United States, Sydney Film Festival in Australia, HARD:LINE Film Festival in Germany, Chattanooga Film Festival in the United States, the Calgary Underground Film Festival in Canada, and the Buenos Aires Rojo Sangre film festival in Argentina, where it won the awards for Best Feature film and Best Cinematography.

During its festival run the film won 12 awards, including 6 wins for Best Feature Film.

It was released theatrically and on VOD in the United States on 24 June 2022, courtesy of Dark Sky Films and got released on the streaming platform Shudder on January 9, 2023.

== Critical response ==
On Rotten Tomatoes, the film currently has an approval rating of 100% based on reviews from 19 critics, with an average rating of 7.5/10. Meagan Navarro of Bloody Disgusting called it a "sumptuous visual feast" and a "gorgeous, ethereal movie full of surprising twists that deftly shift genres".

Erik Piepenburg of The New York Times wrote, "I enjoyed being visually dazzled by the film’s throupling of Eurosleaze gore, sexual psychodramatics (the castration scene is a doozy) and pastiche design. Fans of Mario Bava's Gothic melodramas will be in heaven."

Phuong Le of The Guardian gave the film 3 out of 5 stars, noting that "Dawn Breaks Behind the Eyes will be an acquired taste, but for fans of the genre, it has the potential of becoming a cult favourite."

Mel Valentin of Screen Anarchy wrote, "Dawn Breaks Behind the Eyes (...) is an elegantly directed, impressively realized, ultra-stylish homage to ‘60s and ‘70s Euro-Gothic horror". He characterizes the conflict between Dieter and Margot as one of patriarchy and feminism, while explaining that Eva and Gregor represent the same conflict in a less violent form. Valentin commends the "series of retina-burning images and impressively staged set pieces" created by Kopacka and Dolgner. Despite noting that a "limited budget" leading to a short runtime causes some of the style and ideas to "slip into near incoherence or unintelligibility", Valentin hopes that Kopacka will direct his next film "sooner rather than later."

Sharai Bohannon of Dread Central commented extensively on the chaotic, hallucinogenic nature of the film, writing, "more of an experience than a film, Dawn Breaks Behind the Eyes is so beautiful, chaotic, and bizarre that you can’t but tip your hat to it." Kat Hughes of The Hollywood News wrote that Dawn Breaks Behind the Eyes is "a technical masterpiece made even richer by a compelling narrative." Both Bohannon and Hughes praised the film's sound design.

== Thematic Interpretation ==
At its core, Dawn Breaks Behind the Eyes explores the destructive nature of toxic relationships and the illusion of escape. Critics and analysts interpret the castle as a metaphor for a failing marriage, where the characters are trapped not just physically, but emotionally and psychologically. The shifting realities suggest that the couple is reliving their relationship across different dimensions or states of consciousness, unable to break free from patterns of abuse, resentment, and control. It challenges viewers to look beyond the surface and consider how personal relationships can become prisons, ones we may be doomed to repeat unless we confront their roots.

On a metaphysical level, the film explores the illusory nature of reality and the cyclical imprisonment of consciousness. The film suggests that the characters are trapped in a recursive loop, reliving variations of the same toxic relationship across shifting layers of reality. This reflects a metaphysical purgatory, where personal dynamics become eternal patterns, akin to ghosts bound to a place. Ultimately, the film posits that liberation requires "breaking the script", not just of narrative, but of the ego and relational patterns.

Mel Valentin of Screen Anarchy interprets the conflict as a battle between patriarchy and feminism, with Dieter representing oppressive masculinity and Margot (and later Lilith) embodying suppressed female agency. The introduction of Eva and Gregor presents a less violent but still imbalanced version of the same dynamic, implying that such struggles are cyclical and pervasive.

In Dawn Breaks Behind the Eyes, the names Eva and Lilith carry deep symbolic weight, reinforcing the film’s themes of feminine power, identity, and cyclical oppression.

- Eva evokes the biblical Eve, the first woman, often associated with temptation, knowledge, and the fall from innocence. In the film, Eva represents a recurring female spirit trapped in a toxic relationship across time. Her presence signals a quest for self-realization and liberation.
- Lilith, drawing from Jewish mythology, was Adam’s first wife who refused to submit and was cast out, later becoming a demonized figure of female independence and rebellion. In the film, Lilith symbolizes raw, uncontained sexual power, a force that threatens the male ego (embodied by Dieter/Gregor). Her association with the castle and supernatural occurrences frames her as a guardian of truth and transformation, being wrongfully punished for her behavior.

Together, Eva and Lilith represent two facets of the same feminine archetype: Eva as the earthly, devout wife, and Lilith as the liberated, sexually open counterpart. Their convergence suggests that true dawn—liberation—can only break behind the eyes when the self is fully reclaimed and recognized.
