= The Calling (TV series) =

American crime procedural drama television series

- Genre: Police procedural Drama
- Created by: David E. Kelley
- Based on: Avraham Avraham by Dror Mishani
- Starring: Jeff Wilbusch; Juliana Canfield; Karen Robinson; Michael Mosley; Tony Curran
- Country of origin: United States
- Original language: English
- No. of seasons: 1
- No. of episodes: 8

Production
- Executive producers: Barry Levinson; David E. Kelley; Jason Horwitch; Avi Nir; Alon Shtruzman
- Production companies: Keshet Studios; David E. Kelley Productions; Universal Television

Original release
- Network: Peacock
- Release: November 10, 2022

The Calling is an American crime procedural drama television series created by David E. Kelley for Peacock. It is adapted from Dror Mishani's 2011 novel The Missing File. All eight episodes of the first season premiered on November 10, 2022.

== Premise ==
Detective Avraham Avraham, a New York police detective and religious Jew, has a special knack for solving crimes.

== Characters ==
- Jeff Wilbusch as Detective Avraham Avraham
- Juliana Canfield as Detective Janine Harris
- Karen Robinson as Captain Kathleen Davies
- Michael Mosley as Detective Earl Malzone
- Tony Curran as John Wentworth
- Noel Fisher as Zack Miller

== Episodes ==
No.	Title	Directed by	Written by	Original release date
1	"He's Gone"	Barry Levinson	David E. Kelley	November 10, 2022
2	"The Knowing"	Barry Levinson	David E. Kelley	November 10, 2022
3	"The Horror"	Ali Selim	David E. Kelley	November 10, 2022
4	"The Break"	Martha Mitchell	David E. Kelley	November 10, 2022
5	"Shomer"	Lisa Robinson	Jonathan Shapiro	November 10, 2022
6	"The Pursuers"	Alonso Alvarez	Jason Horwitch	November 10, 2022
7	"The Hand of Diligent"	Erin Feeley	Jonathan Shapiro	November 10, 2022
8	"Blameless and Upright"	Michael Slovis	Jonathan Shapiro & Jason Horwitch	November 10, 2022

== Production ==
In October 2021, it was announced that Peacock had given a straight to series order to The Missing from David E. Kelley based on Dror Mishani's novel The Missing File. The next month, it was announced that Jeff Wilbusch would play the lead character, Avraham Avraham.

In developing Avraham's religious characterization, executive producer Jonathan Shapiro emphasized detailed Jewish accuracy, including distinctions between Sephardic and Ashkenazi tefillin; lead actor Jeff Wilbusch, who was raised in a Hasidic family, said that attention to detail reassured him about the role.

== Reception ==
The review aggregator website Rotten Tomatoes reported a 25% approval rating with an average rating of 5.7/10, based on 12 critic reviews. The website's critics consensus reads, "Hollowing out an intriguing idea with simpleminded execution, this rote spiritual procedural goes to prove that some callings aren't worth answering." Metacritic, which uses a weighted average, assigned a score of 42 out of 100 based on 9 critics, indicating "mixed or average reviews".
