= Barbara Miller =

Swiss film director (born 1970)

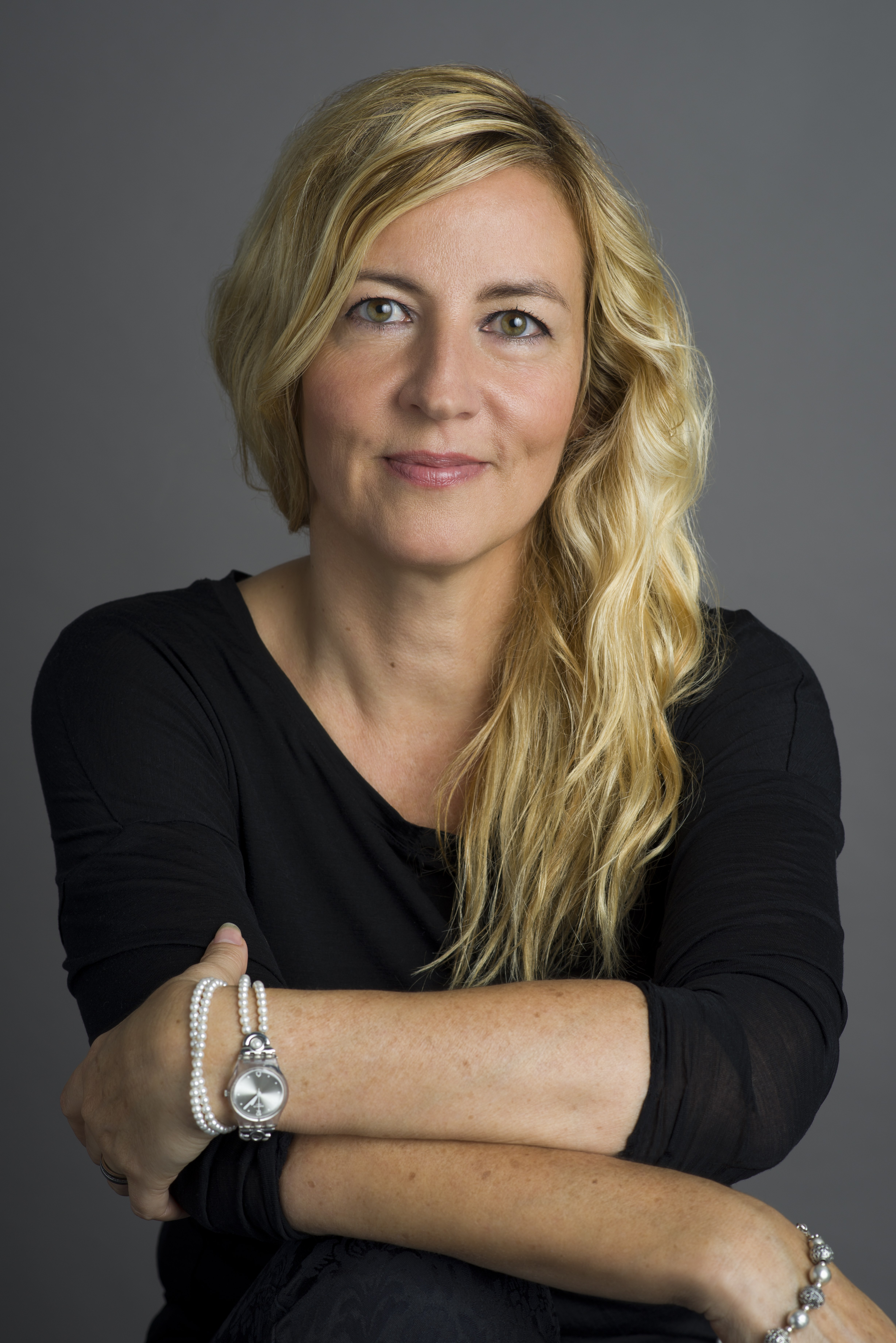
- Barbara Miller in 2018
- Born: Winterthur, Switzerland
- Occupations: Film producer and director

Barbara Miller (born 1970 in Winterthur, canton of Zurich) is a Swiss film director and producer as well as a script writer. She is the president of the Swiss directors and scriptwriters guild ARF/FDS. She lives and works in Zurich.

== Biography ==
Barbara Miller grew up in Zurich and attended a Rudolf Steiner School (Waldorf education) followed by the modern-language high school at the Kantonsschule Küsnacht. She studied film science, philosophy, and psychology at the undergraduate level. In 2008, Miller completed her law degree, earning a licentiate in law from the University of Zurich. During her school years, she worked as an usher in the repertory cinemas, coming into early contact with arthouse films. In 2005, while still a student, Miller began working for the Social Department of the city of Zurich as a socio-educational counselor in various social-pedagogical and low-threshold facilities. She supported hard-to-reach youths, people with drug and alcohol dependencies, individuals involved in street prostitution, and the homeless.

== Work in the film industry ==
After completing her studies, Miller worked as a lawyer and production assistant at the production companies Condor and C-Films AG, playing a key role in developing the TV series Lüthi und Blanc. She also served as legal advisor to Christian Frei during contract negotiations with war photographer James Nachtwey. Beginning in 2009, she collaborated with Frei as assistant director and editor on the feature documentary War Photographer, which was nominated for an Oscar in 2001.

== Director ==
Since 2001, Miller has been creating socially critical documentaries as a freelance director for Swiss television, for humanitarian organizations, and for theatrical release. For Swiss TV she has tackled taboo subjects such as in Domestic Violence, Youth Violence, Sex on the Internet – Children Watch Porn, Parents Look Away, and The Clitoris.

As a director, Miller has produced worldwide humanitarian-mission documentaries focusing on human rights and combating discrimination of the poorest, oppression, and violence. She worked in India and Brazil, as well as in former war and crisis zones such as Cambodia and Kosovo, in refugee camps in Lebanon, and created Two Dreams about the Israeli–Palestinian conflict.

In her theatrical documentary Forbidden Voices she gives voice to three female bloggers, who are harassed by their governments in China, Cuba and Iran.

The film premiered 2021 at the Visions du Réel festival in Nyon, after which it was screened at over 70 festivals around the world.

Her second feature, #Female Pleasure, depicts five women around the globe who fight sexual oppression in their communities that represent the five big religions, whereby Miller "emphasizes how frequently sexual oppression and violence seem justified by scripture." In the film, the German-American author Deborah Feldman represents the Jewish religion. The documentary debuted at the Locarno Film Festival, where it won the Premio Zonta Club Locarno. It went on to receive multiple awards and three Swiss Film Award nominations (Best Documentary, Best Editing, Best Film Music), and sold more than 70,000 tickets in Swiss cinemas alone. The film toured cinemas and festivals globally and was the top-grossing documentary in Swiss cinemas in 2018 and the most successful Swiss theatrical release worldwide in 2019.

In 2024, with her co-director Philip Delaquis, she completed Wisdom of Happiness, a Swiss-American feature film about the 14th Dalai Lama, made in collaboration with Richard Gere and Oren Moverman.

The world premiere took place on 8 October 2024, at the Zurich Film Festival, attended by special guests Richard Gere and the Dalai Lama's sister Jetsun Pema.

Together with Philip Delaquis she established the production company Mons Veneris Films in 2014.

Since 2013, Miller has been a member of the Swiss Film Academy and the European Film Academy. As of 2017, she serves as president of the Association of Film Directors and Screenwriters Switzerland (ARF/FDS).

== Filmography (selection) ==
- 2024: Wisdom of Happiness (co-director Philip Delaquis)
- 2022: Two Dreams - An Israel-Palestinian Village Story
- 2019: Korenkombu – Hope for the Aborigine of India
- 2018: #Female Pleasure
- 2018: Gloria – Women for Peace in Colombia
- 2017: The Children from Shatila. Lebanon
- 2017: Philipp Gurt – Rise from Hell (Vom Schattenkind zum Erfolgsautor – Der schmerzhafte Weg des Philipp Gurt)
- 2016: Voice of Roma – Eine Stimme für Minderheiten im Kosovo
- 2015: Cido, a Future in the Cerrado. Brazil
- 2014: Seed of Hope in the Land of Flood (Cambodia)
- 2013: Na Boomi – My Land (India)
- 2012: Forbidden Voices
- 2009: Virtual Adultery... and Its Impact in Reality
- 2009: Whiplash – Light at the End of the Tunne
- 2008: Sex in the Internet – Kids Watch Porn, Parents Look Away
- 2008: Emergency Room Davos (Docu-Series)
- 2008: Crossing Paths (Short Fiction)
- 2007: Divorced Mothers
- 2006: Youth Violence
- 2005: Klitoris – The Unknown Beauty (Klitoris – Die schöne Unbekannte) (co-director Miranda Emery)
- 2004: Blindman's Buff – When Blind People Start Seeing
- 2003: Elisabeth Kopp – Rise and Fall of the First Federal Councilor (Elisabeth Kopp – Aufstieg und Fall der ersten Bundesrätin)
- 2003: Full-Fat – Slim Down at all Costs?
- 2002: The Summit Stormers – On the Road with Anti-Globalizers (Die Gipfelstürmer – Unterwegs mit Schweizer Globalisierungsgegnern) (co-director Miranda Emery)

== Awards (selection) ==
Forbidden Voices

- 2012: WACC-SIGNIS Human Rights Award: Forbidden Voices (Toronto, Canada)
- 2012: Amnesty International Award (Human Rights Film Festival San Sebastian, Spain): Forbidden Voices
- 2013: Nomination Swiss Film Prize/Best Documentary: Forbidden Voices
- 2013: Nomination Prix de Soleure at the Solothurn Film Festival for Forbidden Voices

Female Pleasure

- 2018 Zonta Prize, Critics Week, Locarno Festival,
- 2019 Special Prize of the Interreligious Jury, International Leipzig Festival for Documentary and Animated Film.
- 2019 Swiss Film Award 2019, Nominations for Best Documentary Film, Best Film Score, Best Film Editing;
- 2019 Romy Award for Best Cinema Documentary.
- 2019 Amnesty International Award at the Thessaloniki Documentary Festival,
- 2019 Audience Award at Millennium Docs Against Gravity in Warsaw.
- 2019 UNESCO Special Recognition Award – Almaty Film Festival
- 2025 Cinema for Peace awards|Cinema for Peace Dove nomination for the Most Valuable Documentary Film of the Year
