= Something Very Bad Is Going to Happen =

2026 American horror television miniseries

- Promotional poster
- Genre: Horror
- Created by: Haley Z. Boston
- Showrunner: Haley Z. Boston
- Starring: Camila Morrone; Adam DiMarco; Gus Birney; Karla Crome; Sawyer Fraser; Jeff Wilbusch; Ted Levine; Jennifer Jason Leigh
- Music by: Colin Stetson
- Country of origin: United States
- Original language: English
- No. of episodes: 8

Production
- Executive producers: Haley Z. Boston; The Duffer Brothers; Hilary Leavitt; Andrea Sperling; Weronika Tofilska
- Cinematography: Krzysztof Trojnar; Bobby Shore
- Editors: Maxime Lahaie; Dev Singh; Roslyn Kalloo
- Running time: 40–59 minutes
- Production companies: Too Much Blood Productions; A Dog's Dream; Upside Down Pictures

Original release
- Network: Netflix
- Release: March 26, 2026

Something Very Bad Is Going to Happen is an American horror television miniseries created by Haley Z. Boston for Netflix. Boston serves as the series showrunner and is also an executive producer along with the Duffer Brothers. Camila Morrone and Adam DiMarco star in the series as an engaged couple whose wedding is derailed. It was released on March 26, 2026.

== Premise ==
Rachel Harkin and Nicholas "Nicky" Cunningham are engaged to be married in less than a week at the Cunninghams' secluded home in the snowy woods of Upstate New York. As the wedding day approaches, increasingly chilling revelations of family lore test the couple's relationship.

== Cast and characters ==
=== Main ===
- Camila Morrone as Rachel Alexandra Harkin
- Adam DiMarco as Nicholas "Nicky" Summer Cunningham, Rachel's fiancé
- Gus Birney as Portia Cunningham, Jules and Nicky's younger sister
- Karla Crome as Nell Cunningham, Jules's second wife
- Sawyer Fraser as Jude Cunningham, Jules's son from his first marriage
- Jeff Wilbusch as Dr. Julian "Jules" Cunningham, Nicky and Portia's older brother
- Ted Levine as Dr. Boris Cunningham, Victoria's husband and Julian, Portia and Nicky's father
- Jennifer Jason Leigh as Victoria Cunningham, Boris' wife and Julian, Portia and Nicky's mother

=== Guest ===
- Zlatko Burić as The Witness
- Amanda Fix as Benjamin
- Victoria Pedretti as young Alexandra Harkin, Rachel's mother
- Josh Hamilton as Jay Holman, Rachel's father
  - Logan Miller as young Jay Holman

== Episodes ==
No.	Title	Directed by	Written by	Original release date
1	"Never Get On One Knee"	Weronika Tofilska	Haley Z. Boston	March 26, 2026
Five days into the future, psychology graduate Rachel Harkin and Nicky Cunningham's wedding looks like a bloodbath. In the present, as Rachel and Nicky drive to his parents' remote cabin, they find a baby alone in a car at a rest stop. Unable to find the baby's parents, Rachel goes to another stop to call for help while Nicky stays with the baby. At the next stop, a nearly empty dive bar, Rachel is stalked by a man whom she stabs through the hand with her car keys, but he is unperturbed and asks her if she is "sure he's the one". Rachel returns to Nicky in a panic, and he reports that the baby's parents had gone for a walk and attacked him when they found him with their baby. The couple make it to the cabin. While Nicky is outside unloading their luggage, Rachel explores the large cabin and meets Nicky's younger sister Portia, his older brother Dr. Jules Cunningham, and Jules' second wife (and Nicky's ex-girlfriend) Nell. Portia tells Rachel the story of how Jules, in his youth, had encountered the "Sorry Man", who allegedly comes up from hell to cut women open in hopes of finding his wife, and is drawn to blood. Later that night, Rachel encounters Nicky's mother Victoria, who cryptically tells her that they will not be seeing much of each other. Rachel finds the message "DON'T MARRY HIM" on a returned wedding invitation.
2	"Bride-Shaped Hole"	Weronika Tofilska	Haley Z. Boston	March 26, 2026
Four days before the wedding. Rachel cannot find her wedding dress, though she is sure that they brought it. Nicky offers to drive back to Chicago to see if they left it behind. Portia reveals that a hundred guests have been invited to the wedding before she, Nell and Victoria make major alterations to Victoria's wedding dress for Rachel to wear. Portia cuts her hand on a broken mirror, and Rachel has an awkward interaction with Nicky's father, Dr. Boris Cunningham, who demands that she take off Victoria's wedding dress. After finding a piece of her original wedding dress, Rachel searches through the house, finding a powerful sedative and syringe in Jules' drawer. As she goes on a walk through the woods, she finds her torn-up wedding dress on an effigy hanging from a tree, then also finds Boris digging a grave. Nicky arrives back at the house and his parents reveal that Victoria has a major brain tumor and the wedding is being planned as one last hurrah. Jude, Jules' young son from his first marriage, confesses to making the effigy to act as a decoy to confuse the Sorry Man after Jude saw Rachel's nose bleed earlier.
3	"I Will Light You on Fire"	Axelle Carolyn	Alex Delyle	March 26, 2026
Three days until the wedding. Portia is trying to make all the finishing touches to the wedding. Rachel has to figure out what everyone wants for dinner at the reception. Nicky confronts his father, as he is working on his taxidermy, to find treatment options for Victoria. While he is taking a bath, Nell confronts Jules about his callousness toward Rachel and the rest of his family (barring Jude), culminating in her pushing his head under the bath water to test if his nihilistic views are genuine. Rachel brings together everyone to try out some therapy. Using the wedding dress effigy as a proxy for Victoria, they all say what they are feeling about her impending death, and then burn the effigy. Jude, using his new video camera from Rachel, explores the basement, where he records a man standing up against the wall. Rachel gets up in the middle of the night to get a glass of water and is attacked by an unknown assailant.
4	"The Witness"	Axelle Carolyn	Kate Trefry	March 26, 2026
Jude wakes up in the middle of the night and hears the struggle. He goes to his father and shows the video he took of the man in the basement. A home video from January 13, 1997 shows Rachel's parents, Jay and Alexandra, eloping to the area where the current story is taking place. On that day in 1997, Jay and Alexandra get married in an empty church with one witness, who Jay tasks with recording the ceremony. Before Alexandra walks down the aisle, the off-camera witness asks her if she is "sure he's the one". When the newlyweds return to their cabin, the pregnant Alexandra starts bleeding from her eyes and nose before dying. Jay is forced to perform an emergency caesarian and cut baby Rachel from the womb. It is revealed in the present day that Rachel was abducted by the man who Jude recorded, her father Jay, and it is he who is showing her the home video. He reveals that he sent her the warning on the back of the invitation, although Rachel explains that she never sent him an invitation in the first place. Jules then breaks into the now dilapidated cabin, claiming that Rachel's father is the Sorry Man after witnessing his actions to save Rachel when Alexandra died. During the chaos, Rachel escapes unnoticed and heads back to the dive bar where the man, the witness from the wedding, returns the favor and stabs Rachel in the leg with a fork. He then tells a story of his great-great-great grandmother, who made a bargain with Death to revive her deceased fiancé, adamant that he was her soulmate, the price being a family curse where any descendant who marries someone not their soulmate, at sunset on their wedding day, would suffer a painful haemorrhage and bleed to death. The Witness was going to marry Marianne, Rachel's great-great-great-great grandmother, but did not go through with it, leading her to marry Thomas Harkin instead, thereby transferring the curse to her bloodline, and as punishment for this Death has made The Witness immortal and forced him to bear witness to every Harkin wedding.
5	"I Think You Just Saved My Life"	Lisa Brühlmann	Ben Bolea	March 26, 2026
Nicky apologizes to Rachel for inviting her father without her knowledge, but she claims to forgive him. They both then suffer through a wedding rehearsal reception where they are inundated by bad relationship advice and questionable stories about other people's relationships. Nicky's father tells how he met Victoria in the ER when she needed to have a finger sewn back on. Rachel is forced to repeat the meet-cute story of how she and Nicky met—she was afraid her plane was going to crash, and Nicky (claiming to be hesitant about boarding the same flight because she would not board) spontaneously offered to drive her, telling her she just saved his life. Jules, obsessed with saving Rachel from dying if Nicky is not her soulmate, challenges the story until finally catching Nicky in a series of lies, mainly lying about initially being on the same flight as Rachel. This leaves Rachel more unsure than ever. At the dinner that night, she tells them about the curse, including the part Jules did not know—that Nicky's family will die if she does not.
6	"Last Night of Freedom"	Lisa Brühlmann	Alana B. Lytle	March 26, 2026
Rachel and Nell search for any of her ancestors that might have survived the curse. They find that only one did not die on her wedding day. Nell notices that all the wedding certificates have the same witness signature. They do find one woman who stayed married for 57 years before her death. Meanwhile, Nicky and Jules join their father for a fox hunt. Jules admits that he and Nell are getting divorced, and their father admits that his marriage to their mother is not what it seems. When Rachel and Nell return, they find that Portia has already begun the bachelorette party she had planned for Rachel. Rachel suggests they do a ritual to summon the dead in order to contact her relative, receiving the cryptic message "Living Dead". During the ritual, an entity smashes into Portia, breaking her nose. Nell tells Rachel to have faith in the version that loved Nicky for three years, and admits to the divorce as well. Nicky confronts his mother over her past infidelity, and how Boris is not his biological father, but she collapses partway through. Rachel and Nell are sharing a passionate kiss when Portia, possessed, interrupts them with the cryptic message "Something living, something dead, something stolen, something red."
7	"Something Living, Something Dead, Something Stolen, Something Red"	Weronika Tofilska	Teleplay by : Alex Delyle; Story by : Alex Delyle & Isaac Sims	March 26, 2026
An hour before the wedding, Victoria has not woken up after she collapsed. Portia desperately wants to cancel the wedding so Victoria gets the chance to witness it happen, but Rachel does not let her. Rachel is able to find the cryptic message in Portia's book on the occult arts: it is the list of ingredients for a type of love potion that would allow whoever drinks it to become soulmates with their target. She frantically begins collecting ingredients for the potion that will turn her into Nicky's soulmate. She first collects blood from the Witness ("something red") and a lock of hair from Victoria's head ("something stolen"), convincing Boris not to euthanize Victoria (by using the sedative) in the process. She then asks Jules and Nell to help her amputate her own right pinky toe ("something dead") before going to collect Nicky's sperm ("something living"). Rachel and Nicky have sex and reconcile before Victoria awakens. As the ceremony is about to begin, Rachel mixes the potion.
8	"I Do"	Weronika Tofilska	Teleplay by : Haley Z. Boston & Ben Bolea; Story by : Haley Z. Boston & Kate Trefry	March 26, 2026
Rachel chooses not to drink the potion, putting her faith in Nicky being her soulmate. The wedding goes ahead, but Nicky, shaken by revelations regarding his parents' marriage, unexpectedly says no at the altar. The wedding reception continues as Rachel and Nicky argue in another room, coming to the realization that they are not each other's soulmates. As the sun sets without the couple getting married, the curse transfers to Nicky's bloodline, and Death (as a screeching, intangible presence that has been felt by the Witness and Rachel) begins to claim all of Nicky's blood relatives, who begin haemorrhaging. Jules finds Jude hiding under a table and locks him in a room with a loud TV to protect him from the ongoing bloodbath. Victoria, dazed from the combination of her tumor and the haemorrhage, asks what is happening. Jules blames Nicky, saying none of this would be happening if he had not walked out. Jules explains the curse has spread to their bloodline, and Portia realises she is going to suffer the same fate (due to a secret marriage in Vegas). Portia begins haemorrhaging, and Death reaches Victoria, who succumbs to the curse. In a desperate attempt to stop the curse, Nicky and his family coerce Rachel into completing the wedding ritual, and the Witness signs his signature. Portia bleeds as it happens. Rachel tells Nicky it is not going to work, they both are cursed and they are not soulmates, but Nicky still believes they are. Rachel, feeling betrayed, glances at everyone, and Nicky emotionally asks if they are still soulmates. The curse begins taking effect on Rachel, who stumbles out the altar, and Portia's condition gets worse. Rachel stumbles as blood starts pouring from her eyes, nose and ears, watching the blood fall on her hands. Rachel stumbles out into the snow, as she falls to her knees, and haemorrhages to death, falling to her back and staining her surroundings with blood. Portia also haemorrhages to death, whimpering as her family cradles her. Death passes over all of the bodies of Victoria's blood relatives and Rachel, before heading to The Witness, his job finally done. Jules and Nell are both beside Jude, Nell turns to Jules and asks why he is not haemorrhaging; he does not answer, but it is strongly implied that the two are true soulmates. Nell sheds tears and kisses Jude, and the two are left staring into each other's eyes. Nicky walks out into the main hall and sees Rachel's corpse, he thumps on the glass to see if she responds, only to realise she is gone. The Witness has one last meal, before Death finally puts him down. The following morning, Rachel is resurrected, and due to passing the curse to Nicky's bloodline, is punished by Death to be the new immortal Witness. Nicky cradles a teddy bear Rachel had gifted him earlier, before witnessing the risen Rachel. Bored and jaded, she asks Nicky if he knows where her lighter is, due to being in shock from all his trauma and seeing Rachel revived from the dead, he does not answer. She walks out the room exasperated, leaving Nicky's life forever. She finds Jude in the corridor, who is taken aback, but Rachel calms him down, and apologises for everything that happened. She warns him to be extremely careful on who he marries, but reassures that she will be there to witness it. Rachel hugs her nephew goodbye and walks to the dining room. She finds all of the dead bodies from the bloodshed, and the Witness' body, with a written message, “YOUR TURN!” He leaves behind an envelope of money, a change of clothes, and the key to his truck. She goes to the truck and finds a lighter, and drives off, leaving behind her old life.

== Production ==
In July 2024, Netflix ordered the series Something Bad Is Going to Happen from creator and showrunner Haley Z. Boston. Boston would also executive produce alongside the Duffer Brothers, Hilary Leavitt, and Andrea Sperling. Camila Morrone and Adam DiMarco were the first to be cast in the series, taking the lead roles. Weronika Tofilska joined the project as another executive producer, planning to direct four episodes, and Jennifer Jason Leigh, Ted Levine, Gus Birney, Karla Crome, Jeff Wilbusch, and Zlatko Burić joined the cast.

Filming began in Toronto in January 2025, running until May.

== Release ==
Something Very Bad Is Going to Happen was released on Netflix on March 26, 2026.

== Reception ==
=== Critical response ===
The review aggregator website Rotten Tomatoes reported an 85% approval rating, based on 66 critic reviews, with an average rating of 7.5/10. The website's critics consensus reads: "Marrying horror and atmospheric storytelling to thrilling effect, Something Very Bad is Going to Happen ably transports newlywed jitters to the surrealist realm of binge-worthy TV." Metacritic, which uses a weighted average, assigned a score of 65 out of 100, based on 22 critics, indicating "generally favorable" reviews.

=== Accolades ===
Award	Category	Nominee	Result	Ref.
Astra TV Awards	Best Actress in a Limited Series or TV Movie	Camila Morrone	Nominated	
Astra TV Awards	Best Limited Series or TV Movie Cast Ensemble	Something Very Bad Is Going to Happen	Nominated	
Astra TV Awards	Best Directing in a Limited Series or TV Movie	Something Very Bad Is Going to Happen	Nominated	
Astra TV Awards	Best Writing in a Limited Series or TV Movie	Something Very Bad Is Going to Happen	Nominated	
Critics' Choice Super Awards	Best Actress in a Horror Series, Limited Series, or Made-for-TV Movie	Camila Morrone	Nominated	
Fangoria Chainsaw Awards	Best Series	Something Very Bad Is Going to Happen	Nominated	
