= Jeff Wilbusch =

Israeli actor (born 1987)

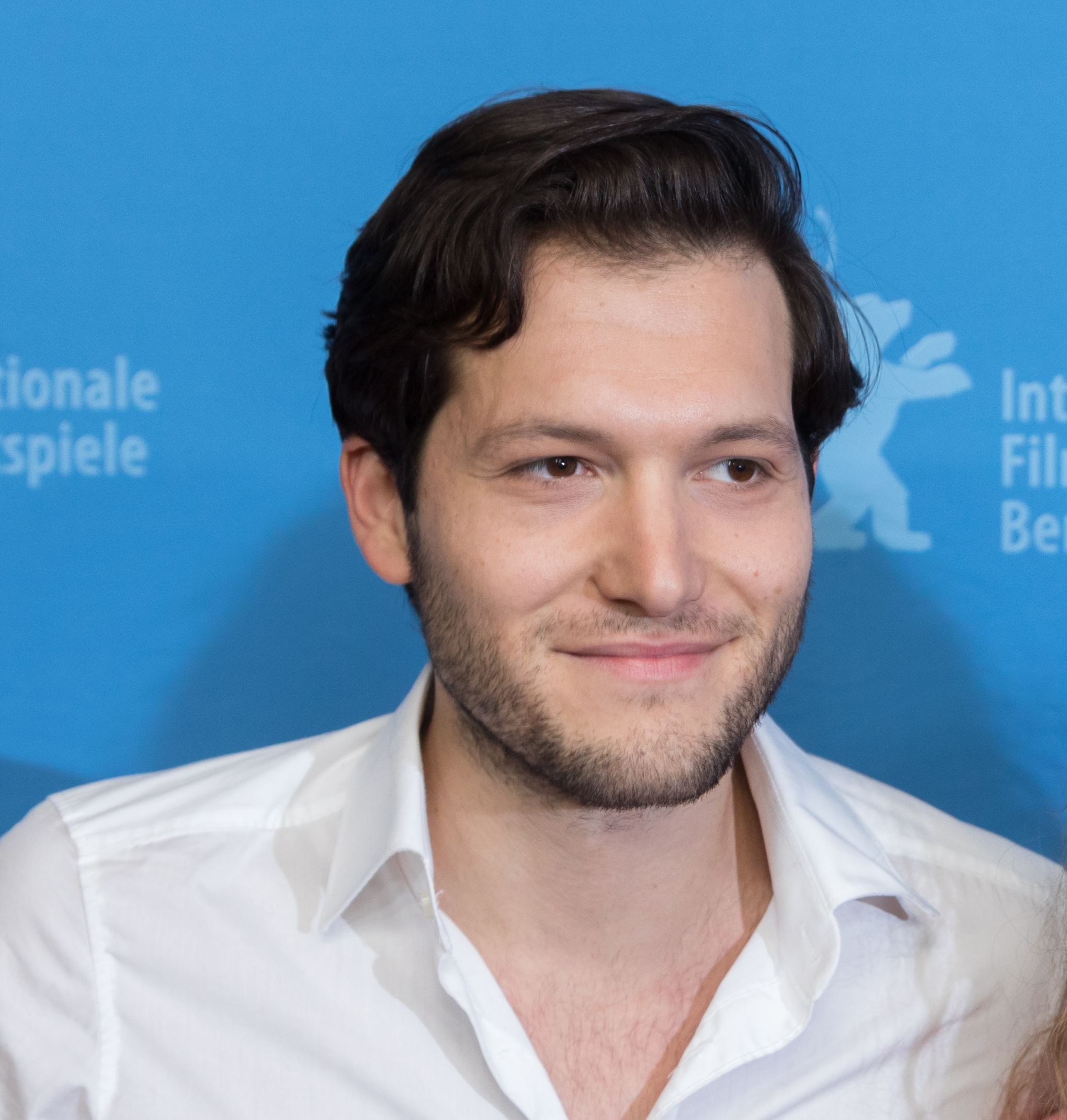
- Wilbusch in 2018
- Born: Jeff Wilbusch; 14 November 1987 (age 38); Haifa, Israel
- Education: University of Amsterdam (MSc)
- Alma mater: University of Amsterdam; Otto Falckenberg School of the Performing Arts
- Occupation: Actor
- Years active: 2016 - Present
- Television: Unorthodox, Something Very Bad is Going to Happen

Jeff Wilbusch (born November 14, 1987) is a German-Israeli actor. He has starred in numerous English and German film and television projects, including Park Chan-wook's miniseries The Little Drummer Girl (2018), Unorthodox (2020), Dawn Breaks Behind the Eyes (2021) and Netflix's Something Very Bad is Going to Happen (2026).

== Early life and education ==
Wilbusch was born on 14 November 1987 in Haifa, Israel, as the eldest of 14 children. He grew up in the Yiddish-speaking Hasidic Jewish Satmar community of Mea Shearim, Jerusalem.

At the age of 13, Wilbusch relocated to the Netherlands.

He attended the University of Amsterdam obtaining a Masters degree in Economics in 2011. After finishing his graduate degree, Wilbusch moved to Munich and studied theatre at the Otto Falckenberg School of the Performing Arts until 2015.

== Career ==
While studying at the Otto Falckenberg School of the Performing Arts, Wilbusch starred in numerous productions staged at the Munich Kammerspiele, working with directors Johan Simons, Stephan Kimmig, and Martin Kušej.

In 2018, he played Anton Mesterbein in the BBC–AMC miniseries The Little Drummer Girl, directed by Park Chan-wook, and starred as Noah Weisz in the German–Luxembourgish series Bad Banks.

In 2020, he gained international recognition for his portrayal of Moishe Lefkovitch in the Netflix miniseries Unorthodox, directed by Maria Schrader. His performance earned him the Satellite Award for Best Supporting Actor in a Limited Series or Television Film.

In 2021, he portrayed Uri Savir in the HBO television film Oslo, directed by Bartlett Sher and produced by Marc Platt and Steven Spielberg, among others. He also appeared as Gregor Grause in the German gothic horror feature Dawn Breaks Behind the Eyes.

In 2022, Wilbusch appeared in the Netflix survival drama Keep Breathing and starred as Detective Avraham Avraham in the Peacock crime drama The Calling, directed by Barry Levinson and produced by David E. Kelley.

In 2026, he appeared as Julian "Jules" Cunningham in the Netflix horror series Something Very Bad Is Going to Happen, executive produced by the Duffer Brothers and Hilary Leavitt through their Upside Down Pictures deal with Netflix, with episodes directed by Weronika Tofilska.

== Personal life ==
Raised multilingual, Wilbusch speaks English, Dutch, German, Hebrew, and Yiddish fluently.

== Filmography ==
=== Television ===
Year	Title	Role	Notes
2018	Bad Banks	Noah Weisz	Main cast Hulu miniseries
2018	The Little Drummer Girl	Anton Mesterbein	3 episodes BBC One–AMC miniseries
2020	Unorthodox	Moishe Lefkovitch	Main cast Netflix miniseries
2021	3 ½ Stunden	Sasha Goldberg	TV movie (German historical drama)
2021	Oslo	Uri Savir	TV movie
2022	Keep Breathing	Danny	Main cast Netflix miniseries
2022	The Calling	Det. Avraham Avraham	Main cast Peacock series
2026	Something Very Bad Is Going to Happen	Julian "Jules" Cunningham	Netflix miniseries Executive produced by the Duffer Brothers

=== Film ===
Year	Title	Role	Notes
2017	Einmal bitte alles	Max	
2021	Dawn Breaks Behind the Eyes	Gregor Grause	
2022	Schächten – A Retribution	Victor Dessauer	German-language film (Schächten)

=== Music videos ===
- 2022 – "Highway to Your Heart" by Lykke Li – Directed by Theo Lindquist; starring Lykke Li and Jeff Wilbusch.

== Awards and nominations ==
Year	Award	Category	Work	Result
2021	Satellite Awards	Best Supporting Actor – Series, Miniseries or Television Film	Unorthodox	Won
