= Forbidden Voices =

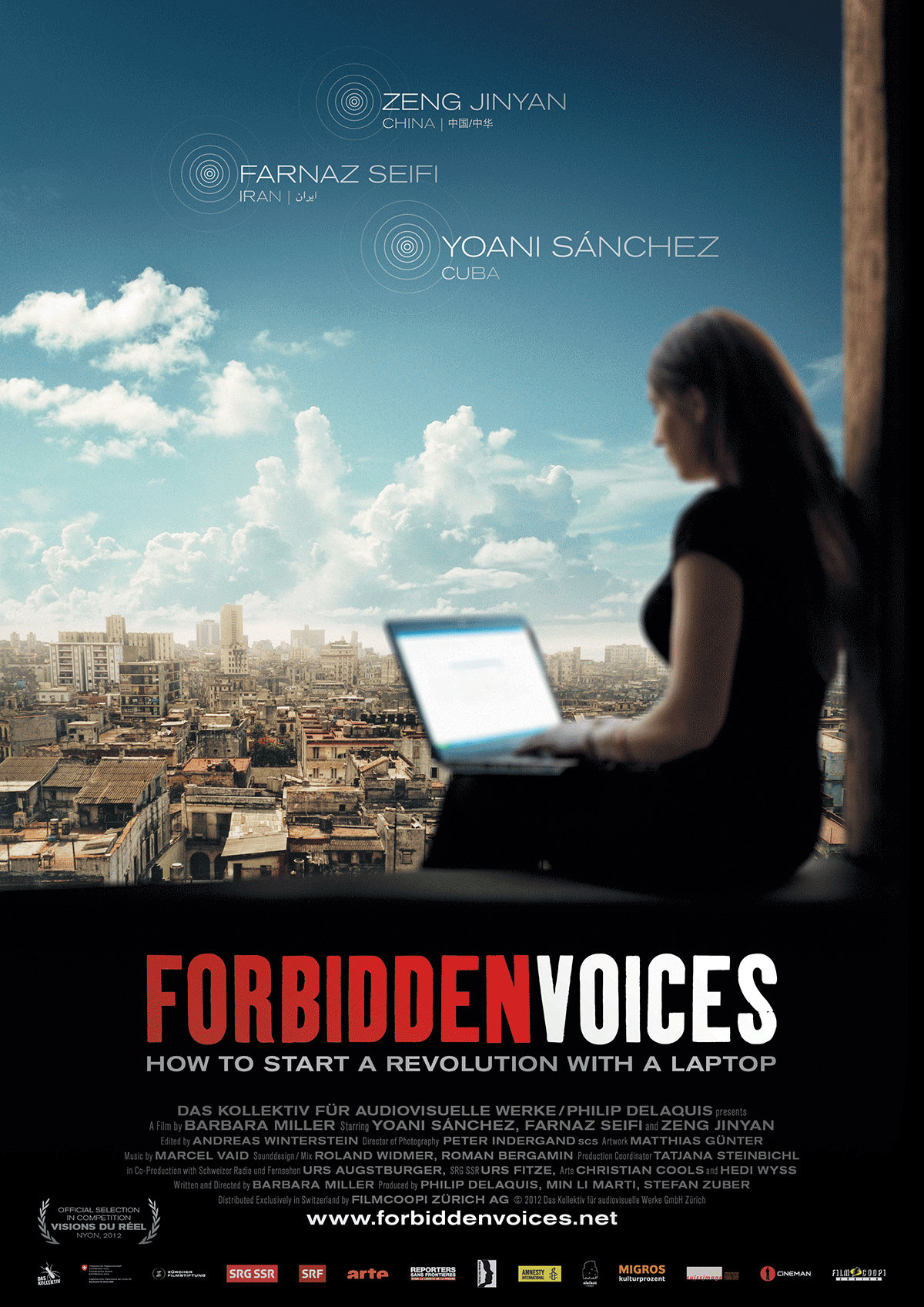
- Film poster
- Directed by: Barbara Miller
- Written by: Barbara Miller
- Produced by: Philip Delaquis
- Starring: Yoani Sánchez; Zeng Jinyan; Farnaz Seifi; Lucie Morillon (Reporters without Borders)
- Cinematography: Peter Indergand & Peter Indergand
- Edited by: Andreas Winterstein
- Music by: Marcel Vaid
- Production company: Das Kollektiv für audiovisuelle Werke GmbH
- Distributed by: Das Kollektiv für audiovisuelle Werke GmbH (world rights), Filmcoopi Zürich (Switzerland)
- Release dates: April 23, 2012 (Visions du Réel); May 10, 2012 (Switzerland)
- Running time: 96 minutes
- Country: Switzerland
- Languages: English; Spanish; Chinese; Persian; French

Forbidden Voices is a documentary film by director Barbara Miller about the fight for human rights and freedom of speech of three female bloggers: Yoani Sánchez from Cuba, Zeng Jinyan from China and Farnaz Seifi from Iran.

The film explores the motivation and goals of the online activists' struggle and traces the consequences and political repression the three women are facing for their courageous activism. The documentary won the Amnesty International Award 2013 and the WACC SIGNIS Human Rights Award 2012, and was nominated for the Swiss Film Award and the Prix de Soleure in 2013.

== Internet censorship and repression ==
Forbidden Voices describes how Internet access in Cuba is still prohibited for the average citizen, and Internet censorship in China and Internet access in Iran are very harsh, the blogs of the three protagonists are censored, blocked or even shut-down by their governments. Seen by their governments as dissidents the bloggers are often under surveillance and facing harsh repression. Yoani Sánchez has been beaten and arrested, as well as publicly defamed on Cuban State TV for fighting for human rights in Cuba; Zeng Jinyan lived for years with her husband Hu Jia and her newborn daughter under house arrest in Beijing for their fight for human rights in China; and Farnaz Seifi has been arrested for her fight against gender inequality in the Islamic Republic of Iran and forced into exile.

== Premiere and awards ==
The award-winning documentary Forbidden Voices premiered at the 2012 Visions du Réel Film Festival in Nyon, Switzerland, and had its international premiere at IDFA, The International Documentary Film Festival Amsterdam.

Awards:

- 2012: WACC-SIGNIS Human Rights Award: Forbidden Voices (Toronto, Canada)
- 2012: Amnesty International Award (Human Rights Film Festival San Sebastian, Spain): Forbidden Voices
- 2012: Nomination Swiss Film Prize/Best Documentary: Forbidden Voices
- 2013: Nomination Prix de Soleure at the Solothurn Film Festival

== Reviews ==
- "Forbidden Voices is a compelling and deeply disturbing documentary that makes those of us who freely sit at our laptops and type realize how much we take for granted, and how powerful these women's voices are in their repressive societies." (Review by Leah Kolb, Bitch Flicks)
- "This is a humbling documentary for a reporter to watch. Following three bloggers whose beat is their government's oppression, we see the extreme lengths they go to tell the world their stories: They bear house arrest, get beaten up by police, live for years in exile. ... Yet despite the misery these women's governments put them through, Forbidden Voices is hopeful: Information can no longer be managed by the state. That's largely because of technology, but equally due to the spirit of women like Sanchez, Farnaz, and Zeng." (Review Forbidden Voices, by Daniel Person, Seattle Weekly)
- "The film opens with blood-curdling screams of Yoani Sánchez. The Cuban blogger fought in February 2010 against an ambush-style arrest by the secret police, and the courageous woman was able to achieve in that critical moment the impossible, namely to operate unnoticed the recording button on her mobile phone. The ugly face of the ubiquitous apparatus of repression in the realm of the Castro brothers who still enjoy in certain circles a residual prestige ("After all, Cuba has a free health and education system for all"), could hardly be shown more impressively then as with this dramatic opening sequence." (Review Forbidden Voices, by Geri Krebs, NZZ)

== Additional press ==
- CNN: Forbidden Voices: Female bloggers fight for freedom of speech
- Bitch Flicks: Documentary Explores the Forbidden Voices of Three Female Bloggers
- Seattle Weekly News: Review of Forbidden Voices
- Deutsche Welle (TV): Video summary on Forbidden Voices
- Reporters Without Borders: Forbidden Voices - Film Tribute To Three Exceptional Women Bloggers
- Women Make Movies: Women Make Movies article on Forbidden Voices
- SRF (Swiss TV) article: Forbidden Voices - Forbidden Votes
