= Otto Falckenberg School of the Performing Arts =

Arts academy in Munich, Germany

Coordinates: 48°08′17″N 11°34′54″E

- Otto-Falckenberg-Schule
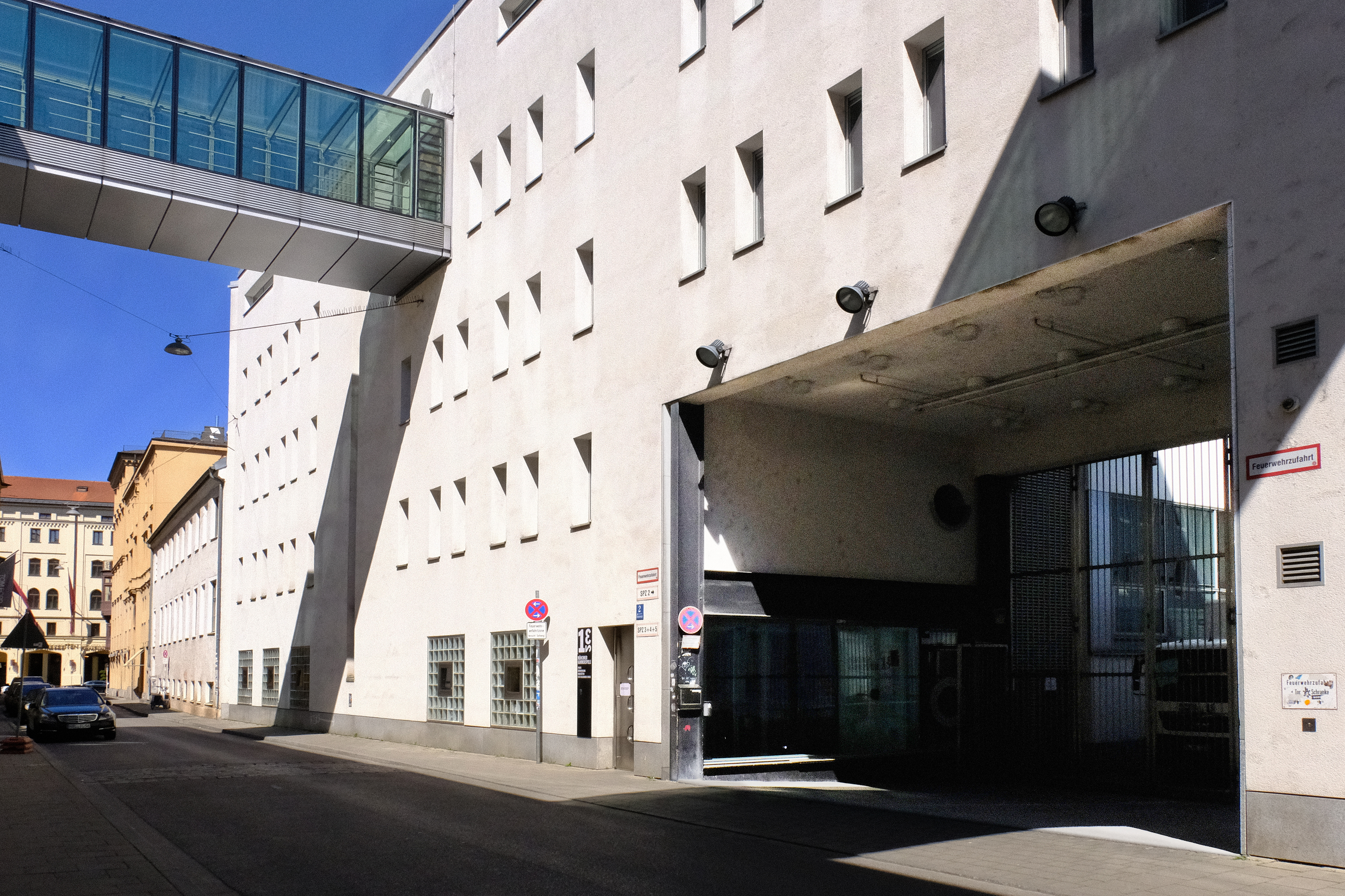
- Entrance to the school on Falckenbergstraße (2020)
- Munich; Germany

Information
- Former name: Städtische Schauspielschule
- Established: 1946
- Principal: Jochen Noch

The Otto Falckenberg Schule – Fachakademie für darstellende Kunst der Landeshauptstadt München, or Otto Falckenberg School of the Performing Arts, is a higher education academy in Munich training actors and directors, affiliated to the Münchner Kammerspiele. It was founded in 1946 as the Städtische Schauspielschule but renamed to its present name on 1 March 1948, after the director and theatre manager Otto Falckenberg. Its current director is Jochen Noch and assistant director Sigrid Herzog.

== Alumni ==
- Monika Baumgartner
- Jens Harzer
- Alexander Held
- Pola Kinski
- Waldemar Kobus
- Joachim Król
- Tobias Moretti
- Franka Potente
- Edgar Selge
- Jeff Wilbusch
