= Thunerseespiele =

Open air musical productions at Thun, Switzerland

Coordinates: 46°44′13″N 7°37′57″E

The Thunerseespiele are open-air musical productions during summer located at Thun, the main city of the Bernese Oberland, in Switzerland. Every year internationally-famous productions are staged.

The location is at the shoreline of Lake Thun (Thunersee). The stage is temporarily built every year over the water, especially for this production. The stage orientation allows the audience to see scenic panoramas with the Eiger, Mönch and Jungfrau mountain peaks rising over Switzerland in the background.

== Productions ==
- 2003: Evita
- 2004: Anatevka
- 2005: Miss Saigon
- 2006: Elisabeth
- 2007: Les Misérables
- 2008: West Side Story
- 2009: Jesus Christ Superstar
- 2010: Dällebach Kari
- 2011: Gotthelf (based on Die Käserei in der Vehfreude)
- 2012: Titanic
- 2013: Der Besuch der alten Dame (based on The Visit)
- 2014: Aida
- 2015: Romeo und Julia
- 2016: Sugar
- 2017: Cats
- 2018: Mamma Mia
- 2019: Ich war noch niemals in New York
- 2022: Io Senza Te
- 2023: Dällebach Kari (Revival)
