= Vithika Yadav =

Indian human rights activist

- Born: 21 December 1980 (age 45); Alwar, Rajasthan
- Education: THNK School of creative Leadership, Lady Shri Ram College for Women
- Occupation: Human Activist

Vithika Yadav is an Indian human rights activist who has worked in the aspect of human trafficking, slavery, gender rights, sexual and reproductive health and rights (SRHR) and future of education. She is currently the Managing Director of Designathon Works, a global foundation on a mission to enable children to design a better world for themselves and for the planet. She is also a child protection expert in South Asia under Purple Foundation. She is known for her work with Love Matters India, a digital initiative on sexual and reproductive health for all genders and sexualities. She also founded TeenBook, a life skills education resource for adolescents, parents and educators. She is an alumna of Lady Shri Ram College and THNK School of Creative Leadership in Amsterdam. She is also a TedX Speaker and has delivered talks at IIT Roorkee, TEDxJIET, SIMS Pune Hague Academy. and TEDx Dubai.

== Work history ==
Yadav worked as a fellow and as a consultant for Free the Slaves. She worked with the United Nations office on drugs and crime for anti human trafficking. She worked as the project coordinator for BBC World Service Trust.

== Awards and accolades ==
- Winner of Gates Institute 120 under 40: The new generation of family planning leaders in 2016
- Winner of Atlas Corps Fellowship in 2007
