= Love Matters (program) =

Company in Netherlands

- Type: Private
- Founded: 2011
- Headquarters: Netherlands
- Services: sex education
- Parent: RNW Media
- Website: LoveMatters.in

Love Matters is a global program providing information on relationships, sex and love. The idea was first developed in the Netherlands by the independent media producer by Michele Ernsting and Michelle Chakkalackal at RNW Media. It has been referred to as a freedom of speech program. Its current target countries are Kenya, Uganda, China, Egypt, Mexico, Venezuela and India.

== Purpose ==
Love Matters works mainly online via its own websites and social media channels. In each region, it provides the same delivery method, but the content and language are tailored to each target market. It seeks to bridge the gap in sexual reproductive health information between young people, sexual health experts, educators and services. The concept has been honored by the World Association for Sexual Health and is also mentioned in the United Nations manifesto on reproductive health.

== History ==
The first Love Matters platform was launched in November 2010 in Netherlands, and then subsequently launched in India in 2011. This was following the banning of sexual education in a number of regions in India in the years prior to this. The platform expanded rapidly to Latin America, Africa, the Middle East and China.

RNW Media launched the idea after seeing problems globally with sex education. The coverage in India gave them a platform to launch the idea, with them launching Love Matters India in late 2011. The idea came following decades of work by RNW Media, using shortwave radio. The Dutch media group partnered with a number of local institutions, including the Indira Gandhi National Open University for Love Matters.

The exact strategy for the launch was created following a survey they carried out with young Indian citizens in Delhi and Mumbai. Originally the platform was launched as a website, with the focus shifting to mobile CSS-styled websites after the survey's results clearly stated that their target market of young people wanted to access the information predominantly on their mobile phones.

Love Matters second launch was in South America in 2011, with “Hablemos de Amor”, which translates as Let’s talk about Love. The region and name were later redefined, with the Latin American version of the platform focusing on three areas, Venezuela, Mexico and Cuba. The title was also changed to Hablemos de Sexo y Amor, to include sex in the title, a bid to make the platform more popular amongst men. The next step for the platform was to move to Kenya, where it went live in 2012. As part of the launch, Kenyan newspaper The Star, launched a weekly feature and an advice column, talking about common relationship issues.

In 2013, Love Matters took the decision to expand to China, where it is commonly taboo for people to openly talk about sex and sexual problems. This has contributed to the increase in teenage pregnancy in the country. When Love Matters and their partners in China carried out a survey in Beijing, it found that 47% of the young people had never received formal sex education. Of the 47%, nearly two thirds of them wanted to have access to more information.

After the success of the platform in various regions, it was expanded to the Middle East. The platform aims to tackle many taboos within Middle Eastern culture, which in general doesn't offer sex education within schools. Al Hubb Thaqafa, which can be translated to love is culture, is predominantly managed and run by Middle Eastern women. While Love Matters approach goes against many traditional views in countries such as Iran, Pakistan and Egypt, it has been accepted by many as a social tool for sex education, especially for females in the region.

== Content ==
Love Matters India works locally with many institutions to help promote the platform to local people. It is a sex-positive platform, meaning it refuses to be censored by religion or taboos. On that particular platform, visitors post blogs and queries, which are answered by the fictitious person Auntyji. The figure is aimed to provide a motherly figure for younger individuals, based on the relationship between elders and young adults in Indian culture. The framework of the site is to answer many general questions that Indians may have, while also providing tools such as an encyclopaedia of sex terms to promote self-learning.

Other information and medical coverage is also displayed on many of the platforms, including information on HIV and AIDS. In regions such as Kenya, Love Matters has also distributed content using the existing media channels. From 2012 onwards, the platform partnered with The Star in Kenya, to write on a weekly basis about common relationship problems.

== Locations ==
Love Matters operates regionally, creating targeted content, dependent on what is required for that given target region. The earliest launch was in India, with other locations such as Kenya soon following. Other major regional platforms have included Latin America, China and the Middle East.

== Coverage ==
The Love Matters concept received recognition in 2013 from the World Association for Sexual Health, following its expansion to various locations globally. After receiving the award, a member of the awarding panel stated in an interview that he believed Love Matter carried out “innovative work in reaching a large number of young people in challenging settings.”

In recent times, Love Matters was mentioned by the United Nations as part of their advice manifesto for their guidelines on reproductive health.
