= Ryken =

Ryken is a surname. Notable people with the surname include:

- Leland Ryken, American literary scholar
- Philip Ryken, American college president, son of Leland
- Theodore James Ryken (1797–1871), Dutch founder of the religious order Xaverian Brothers

== See also ==
- St. Mary's Ryken High School, named after Theodore James Ryken
- Paul Rykens (1888–1965), Dutch businessman, founder of Unilever
- Rijken and Rijkens, Dutch surnames
- Riken, Japanese research institute
- Rykener, English surname
