= Synagogue Neustadt (Dresden) =

Liberal Hasidic synagogue in Dresden, Germany

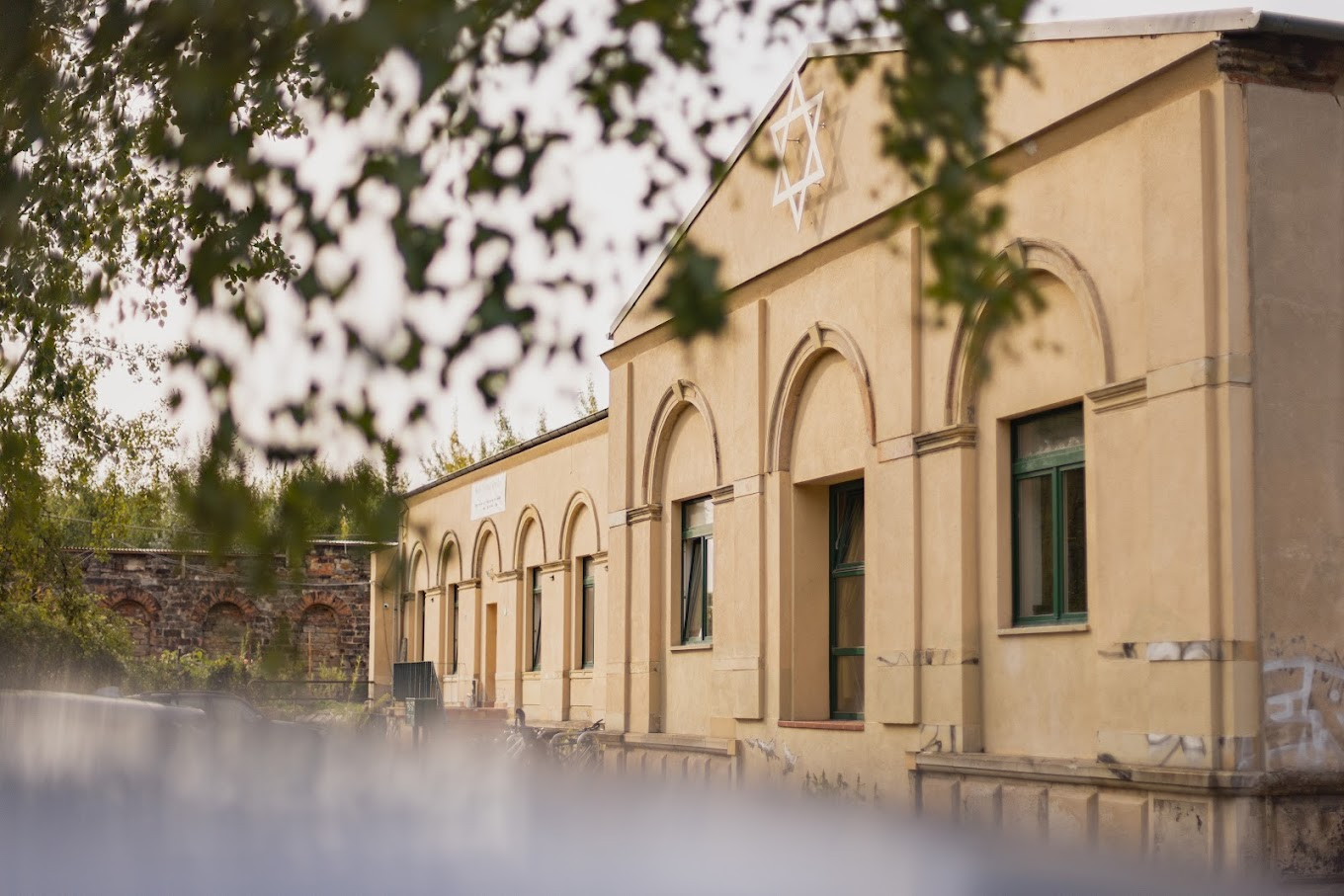
- The former railway station, now synagogue

- Location of the synagogue in Saxony

Religion
- Affiliation: Hasidic Judaism
- Rite: Neo-Hasidism; Nusach Ashkenaz
- Ecclesiastical or organizational status: Synagogue
- Leadership: Rabbi Akiva Weingarten
- Status: Active

Location
- Location: Eisenbahnstr 1, Dresden, Saxony
- Country: Germany
- Interactive map of Synagogue Neustadt
- Coordinates: 51°04′01″N 13°44′15″E

Architecture
- Type: Railway station
- Established: 2021 (as a congregation)
- Completed: 1839 (as a railway station); 2022 (as a synagogue)

Specifications
- Capacity: 250 seats
- Interior area: 4,800 sq ft (450 m^{2})

Website
- juedische-gemeinde-dresden.de (in German)

The Synagogue Neustadt is a liberal neo-Hasidic Jewish congregation and synagogue, located on Eisenbahnstr, in Dresden, in the state of Saxony, Germany. The congregation was founded in 2021 and, since 2022, has occupied a mid-19th-century building, built in 1839 as the main hall of the former Leipzig train station in Dresden, between the Blaue-Fabrik and Hanse 3.

== History of the building ==
The Leipzig train station was located in the northeast–southwest direction between the Großenhainer Straße and the Leipziger Straße. To the southwest, the former Leipziger Platz originally bordered the railroad facilities to the southwest of the railroad area. Towards the northeast, the railroad facility grew over time and reached its greatest extent shortly before today's Pieschen branch.

It was the first long-distance train station in Central Europe on the Leipzig–Dresden railway line and was an important architectural monument in Germany.

In 1837, construction work on the station began and from July 19, 1838, the station facilities were used for railroad operations. From Dresden, trains initially ran on the already completed section to Weintraube, and from September 16, 1838, to Oberau.

The Leipzig station was not inaugurated until April 7, 1839, almost nine months after the start of operations.

During the Second World War, the new station Dresden-Neustadt was the starting point of two deportation trains. On January 21, 1942, a train with 224 Jews from the Dresden-Bautzen district left the station in unheated transport carts and reached the Riga ghetto four days later. A little over a year later, on 3. March 1943, 293 Jews from Dresden were loaded into another transport. They had previously had to perform forced labor at Zeiss Ikon AG and had lived in barracks in the Hellerberg Hellerberg Jewish camp. The destination of the second transport with a total of 1500 deportees from different places was the concentration camp Auschwitz- Birkenau. Immediately after arrival, about 820 of them were murdered in the gas chambers.

The Alter Leipziger Bahnhof was a center for transports to the concentration camps in the East. During the bombing of Dresden in 1945, several incendiary bombs hit the former reception building, two parts of the building were subsequently demolished. As a result of the bombing of Dresden, the 2nd floor of the "Ankuftshalle aus Leipzig" of the old Leipzig station was destroyed, which is still missing today and has been replaced by a roof construction that was built.

As late as 1989, a reconstruction of the destroyed parts of the building was planned, they were to be used for a centralisation of express freight handling. The fall of the Berlin Wall put an end to these plans and marked a turning point in the history of the freight station. The buildings of the former reception complex that are still standing are today and are listed as historical monuments.

from 1938 until 1942 the offices of the Nazi Reichsbahn where located in the building and this train station was where the Jews of Saxony were gathered and send the concentration camps.

From 1989 to 2016, the building was rented to other companies as an office building and later for artists, and from 2016 to 2021, the building was vacant.

In December 2021, the Jewish community signed the lease agreement to rent the place and turn it into a synagogue and community center. Renovation of the building lasted until August 26, 2022, when the congregation celebrated its first Shabbat event, although renovation work was not yet completed.

== The congregation ==
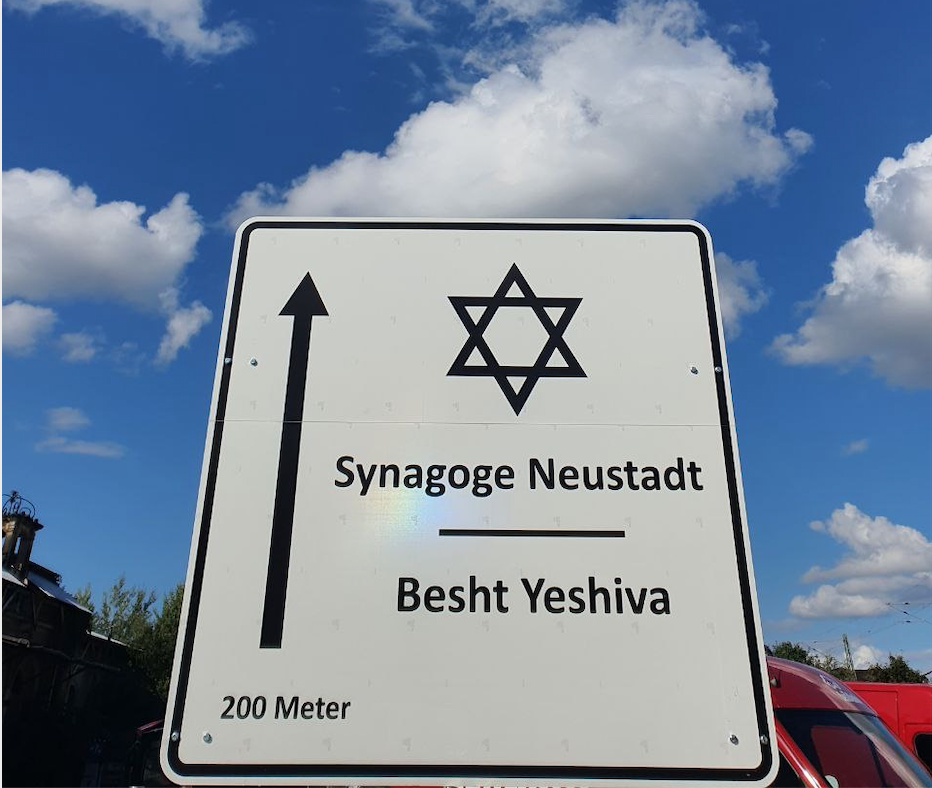
A road sign leading to the synagogue

Rabbi Akiva Weingarten founded the Jewish Community Dresden (German: Jüdische Kultusgemeinde Dresden, abbreviated as JKD) in 2021 as a congregation independent of the Central Council of Jews in Germany.

The synagogue was officially inaugurated on September 3, 2023, with the Lord Mayor of Dresden Dirk Hilbert, Rabbi Arthur Green from Boston, politicians from the city and state level, Rabbis from all over the world and hundreds of guests. The building currently houses the synagogue of approximately 4,800 sq ft (450 m^{2}) with 250 seats where services and community activities are regularly held. The building is divided into two parts, on the right side is where the synagogue, the community kitchen and offices are and on the left side the Besht Yeshiva Dresden classrooms, dormitory and offices are. The office of Rabbi Akiva Weingarten is also located in the building.

== See also ==
- Besht Yeshiva Dresden
- History of the Jews in Germany
- List of synagogues in Germany (in German)
