= Rijkens =

Rijkens is a Dutch surname. Among variant forms are Rijk, Rijke, Rijken, Rijkes and Rijks, while the ij digraph in Dutch names is often replaced with a "y" abroad. These usually are patronymic surnames ("Rijk's son"), but occasionally may stem from rijk meaning "rich" in Dutch. People with these surnames include:

Rijke

- Pieter Rijke (1812–1899), Dutch experimental physicist
- Robine Rijke (born 1996), Dutch cricketer
- Sjaak Rijke (born 1960), Dutch Al-Qaeda kidnapping victim

Rijken / Ryken

- Frank Rijken (born 1996), Dutch gymnast
- Leland Ryken (born 1942), American Christian literary scholar
- Philip Ryken (born 1966), American college president, son of Leland Ryken
- Theodoor Jacobus Rijken or Brother Francis Xavier (1797–1871), Dutch Catholic missionary in the US, founder of the Xaverian Brothers in Belgium
  - St. Mary's Ryken High School, Maryland secondary school sponsored by the Xaverian Brothers\

Rijken

- Hedy Rijken (born 1957 or 1958), American politician of Dutch-Indonesian descent
- Max Rijken (1920-1987), Indonesian-American politician and father of Hedy

Rijkens

- Derk Rijkens (born 1975), Dutch cricketer
- Paul Rijkens (1888–1965), Dutch businessman, founding chairman of Unilever

Rijkes / Rijks

- Jaap Rijks (1919–2017), Dutch equestrian
- Sarah Rijkes (born 1991), Austrian racing cyclist

== See also ==
- De Rijke, Dutch surname meaning "the rich"
