= De Rijke =

De Rijke is a Dutch surnames meaning "the rich (one)". Other forms include De Rijk, De Rijck and De Rijcke, while in Belgium the "ij" can be replaced with a "y" and the article can be merged with the adjective. The variants without an article (Rijke) can also be of patronymic origin ("son of Rijk"). People with such surnames include:

De Rijck / De Rijk / De Ryck / De Ryk / Derijck

- An de Ryck (born 1960s), Belgian brewster
- Beatrix de Rijk (1883–1958), Dutch aviator
- Cornelia de Rijck (1653 – 1726), Dutch painter
- Luc De Rijck (1965–1991), Belgian footballer
- Rudolf de Rijk (1937–2003), Dutch linguist
- Timothy Derijck (born 1987), Belgian footballer

De Rijcke / De Rijke / De Ryke / Derycke

- Abraham de Rijcke (1566–1599), Flemish historical and portrait painter, son of Bernaert
- Alex de Rijke (born 1960), British architect
- Antonius de Rijcke (c.1475–c.1530), Flemish composer
- Bernaert de Rijcke (c.1535-1590), Flemish historical and portrait painter
- Germain Derycke (1929–1978), Belgian racing cyclist
- Johannis de Rijke (1842–1913), Dutch civil engineer and foreign advisor to Japan
- Luc Beyer de Ryke (1933–2018), Belgian journalist and politician
- Maarten de Rijke (born 1961), Dutch computer scientist

Rijke

- Pieter Rijke (1812–1899), Dutch experimental physicist
- Robine Rijke (born 1996), Dutch cricketer
- Sjaak Rijke (born 1960), Dutch Al-Qaeda kidnapping victim

== As a nickname ==
People in the Low Countries nicknamed "the rich" include:

- Beatrix de Rijke (1421–1468), Dutch foundling ("Lucky the Rich"), who survived a flood allegedly because a cat balanced her cradle in the flood waters
- Maria de Rijke (1457–1482), Mary of Burgundy
- Otto de Rijke (c.1060–1113), Otto II, Count of Zutphen
- Willem de Rijke (1487–1559), Count of Nassau-Siegen, father of William the Silent
- Willem de Rijke (1516–1592), William of Cleves
