= New Synagogue (Dresden) =

Synagogue in Dresden, Germany

- German: Neue Synagoge
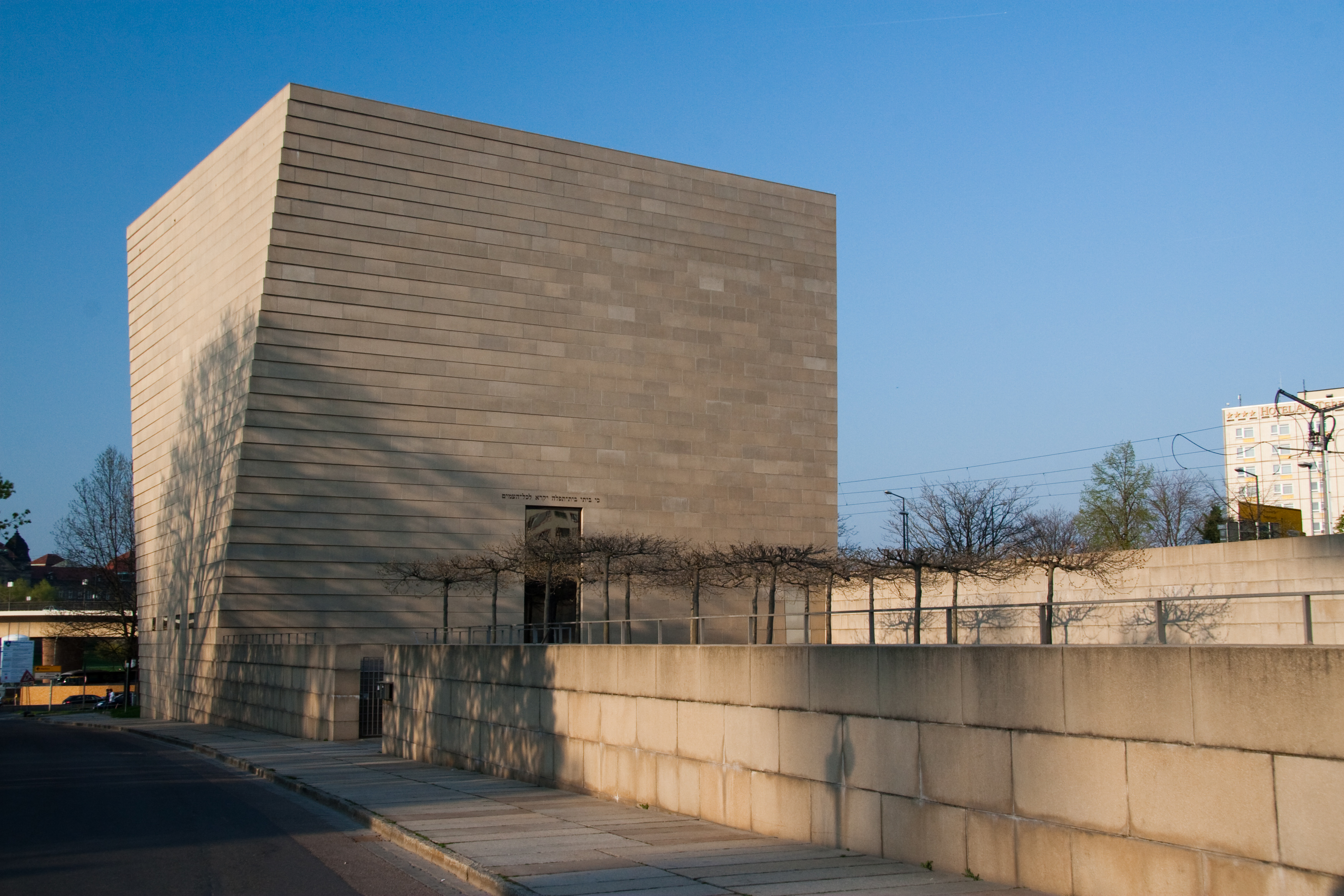
- The new synagogue in Dresden in 2009

- Location of the synagogue in Saxony

Religion
- Affiliation: Judaism
- Ecclesiastical or organizational status: Synagogue
- Status: Active

Location
- Location: Hasenberg 1, Dresden, Saxony
- Country: Germany
- Interactive map of New Synagogue
- Coordinates: 51°3′9″N 13°44′48″E

Architecture
- Architects: Rena Wandel-Hoefer; Wolfgang Lorch
- Type: Synagogue architecture
- Style: Modernist
- Completed: 2001

Specifications
- Direction of façade: East (orientation)
- Materials: Concrete

The New Synagogue (German: Neue Synagoge) is a Jewish congregation and synagogue, located at Hasenberg 1, in the old town of Dresden, Germany. The edifice was completed in 2001 and designed by architects Rena Wandel-Hoefer and Wolfgang Lorch. It was built on the same location as the Semper Synagogue (1839–1840) designed by Gottfried Semper, which was destroyed in 1938, during the Kristallnacht.

== Overview ==
The boundary wall of the New Synagogue incorporates more or less the last remaining fragments of Semper's original building. The outer walls of the synagogue are built slightly off plumb, intended by the architect to convey the feeling that the Jewish community has always been slightly set off from the German city. Another reason is that the praying direction faces east, towards Jerusalem. The synagogue is also a contrast to the city center with which it is juxtaposed. It is set on a slight rise just at the edge of Dresden's baroque center, which was completely flattened by allied bombing during the war. The center is being rebuilt with buildings whose exteriors (and in the case of the more significant buildings, also interiors, though not construction materials,) are precise replicas of the baroque royal city that long made Dresden famous. The synagogue and the community center stand on both sides of where the Semper Synagogue once stood, but it is not a replica of the historic Semper Synagogue. It is a Modernist architectural statement that contrasts with its neighbors. Light enters the windowless cubic concrete structure through the roof and entrance area.

Inside, the sanctuary building is a cube (all service functions are located in the companion building set at the other end of a stone plaza.) Within this cube is set a square worship space, curtained off on all four sides by an enormous draping of curtains made of chain-mesh in a golden metal, evoking an echo of the scale of the Temple at Jerusalem.

The building was shortlisted by the jury for the European Union Prize for Contemporary Architecture in 2003.

On New Year's Eve (Silvester in German) in 2012, the mail box was broken at the entrance to the synagogue and a blasphemous inscription was spray-painted on the external wall, which was interpreted as an anti-Semitic act.

== Rabbis ==
The following individuals have served as rabbi of the congregation:

Ordinal	Name	Term started	Term ended	Time in office	Notes
1	Almekias Siegl	1998	2011	12–13 years	Also served in all three Saxonian cities
2	Alexander Nechama	2012	2018	5–6 years	
3	Akiva Weingarten	2019	2021	1–2 years	

== Gallery ==
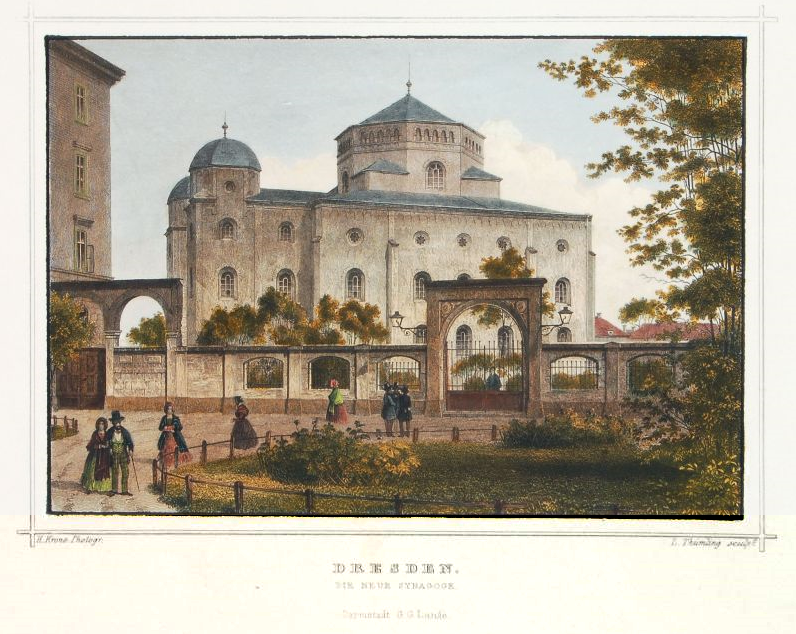
The Semper Synagogue, c. 1860

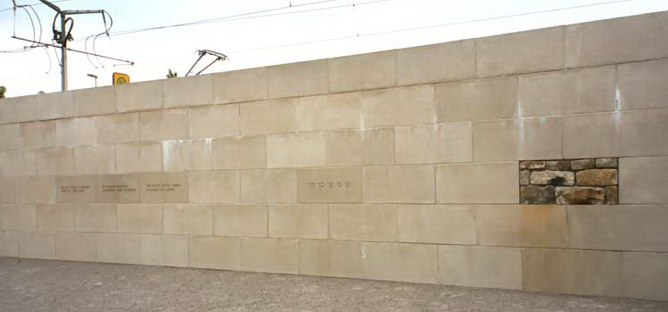
The wall of the New Synagogue contains the last remaining fragments of Semper's synagogue

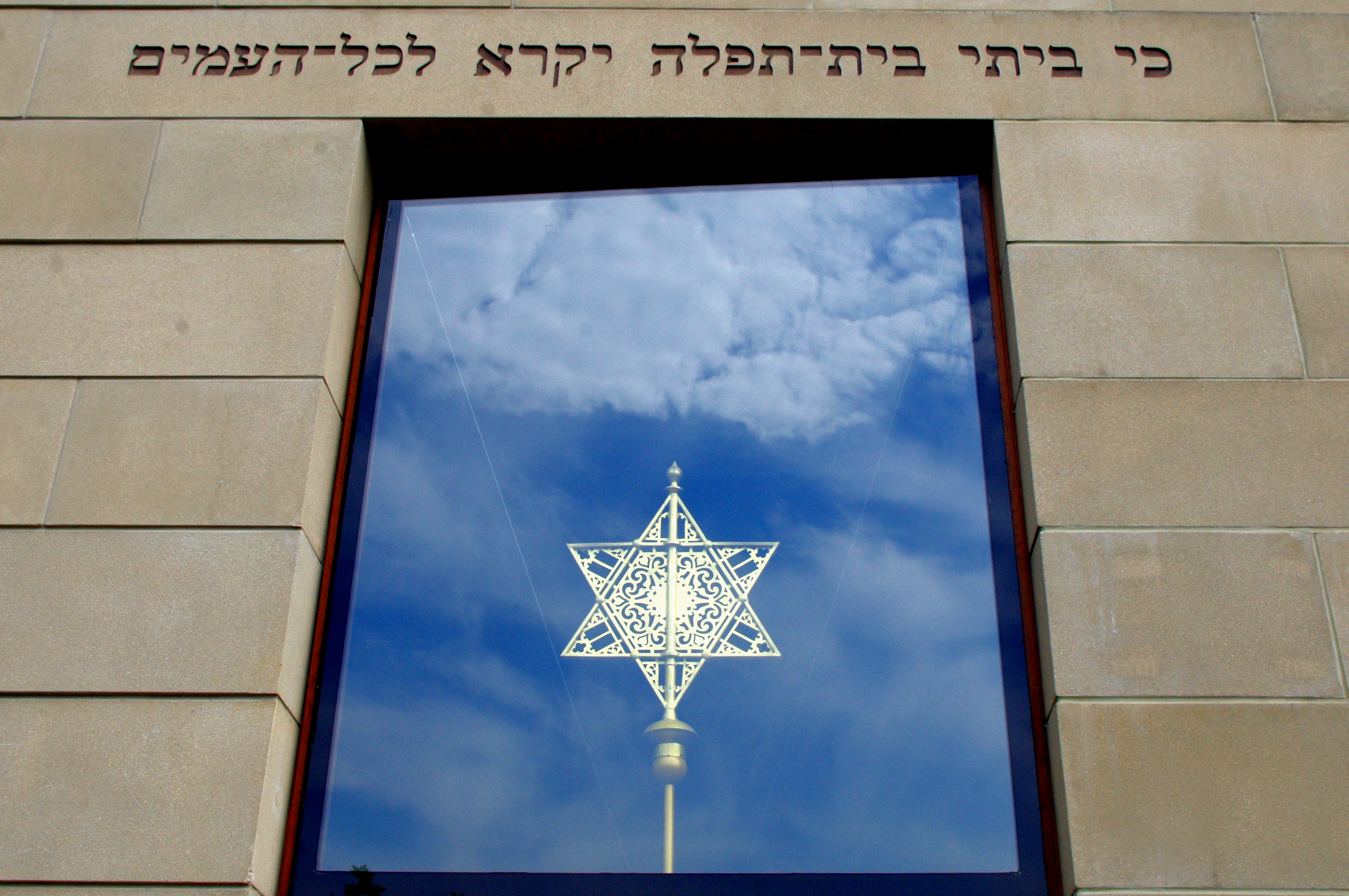
The Star of David finial from the Semper Synagogue, on display at the New Synagogue

== See also ==
- History of the Jews in Germany
- List of synagogues in Germany (in German)
