= Semper Synagogue =

Former synagogue in Dresden, Germany

- German: Alte Synagoge
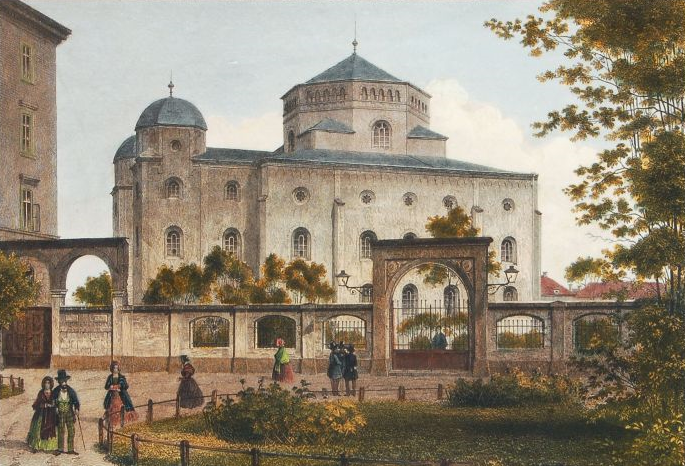
- The former Semper Synagogue, in c. 1860

- Location of the former synagogue in Saxony

Religion
- Affiliation: Judaism (former)
- Ecclesiastical or organizational status: Synagogue (1840–1938)
- Status: Destroyed

Location
- Location: Dresden, Saxony
- Country: Germany
- Interactive map of Semper Synagogue
- Coordinates: 51°03′09″N 13°44′48″E

Architecture
- Architect: Gottfried Semper
- Type: Synagogue architecture
- Style: Romanesque Revival; Moorish Revival
- Completed: 1840
- Destroyed: November 9, 1938 (on Kristallnacht)

The Semper Synagogue, also known as the Dresden Synagogue or Old Synagogue (German: Alte Synagoge), was a Jewish synagogue, located in Dresden, in the Saxony region of Germany. Designed by Gottfried Semper and built from 1838 to 1840 in the Romanesque Revival and Moorish Revival styles, the synagogue was destroyed by the Nazis on November 9, 1938, during Kristallnacht.

The New Synagogue, inaugurated in 2001, was erected adjacent to the site of the former Semper Synagogue where a monument showing a six branch menorah stands in memory of the six million Jews who perished in the Holocaust.

== History and destruction ==
The synagogue was destroyed in 1938 on Kristallnacht. Nazis burned down the synagogue on the night of 9 November 1938. A few days after the burning, the ruins were carried away "professionally" and the bill to cover these costs was handed to the Jewish congregation. A film made by the "Technischen Hilfswerk" documented the efficient removal of the building. All that remained of the synagogue was the Semper-designed Star of David, which Alfred Neugebauer, a fireman, removed from the burning rooftop, hid and returned to the congregation in 1949.

== Architecture ==
Semper was the first architect to borrow the Moorish iconography for a synagogue. His countless imitators and followers include Semper's student Otto Simonson, who would construct the magnificent Moorish Revival Leipzig synagogue in 1855, and Adolf Wolff, who built the Great Synagogue of Łódź and synagogues in Nürnberg, Stuttgart, Helbronn and Ulm. Many other architects of the late 19th century followed the style of this synagogue.

=== Interior ===
While the exterior was Romanesque Revival, its interior featured the richly ornamented style that was to become the hallmark of Moorish Revival architecture. The elaborate Arabic-style interior had a two-tiered balcony supported by columns copied from the Alhambra. The arches and balcony fronts were richly worked with intricate polychrome foliate and lattice designs in the Moorish style. According to Harry Frances Mallgrave, most of the ornaments "were painted on the plaster surfaces in imitation of more costly materials."

==== Eternal light ====
The interior design included furnishings - all designed by Semper, who considered each project as a Gesamtkunstwerk. For the synagogue he created a Ner Tamid - silver lamp of eternal light, placed before the Torah scrolls, which caught Richard Wagner and his wife Cosima's fancy. They gave a great deal of effort to procure a copy of this lamp.

=== Exterior ===
The synagogue was situated along the old city ramparts, along the river, some five hundred meters from the new theatre (known as the Semperoper) that Gottfried Semper was constructing at the same time he built the synagogue. The building was purposely designed to be modest, as Chief Rabbi Dr Zacharias Frankel said at the opening ceremony: "we were not driven by the desire to brag with an opulent building; rather we wanted to find an appropriate place of worship, (...) where we show ourselves before God in devout communion." The synagogue was a plain cube structure, built in a Romanesque style with a humble vestibule and twin towers that marked the entrance to the building.

== Gallery ==
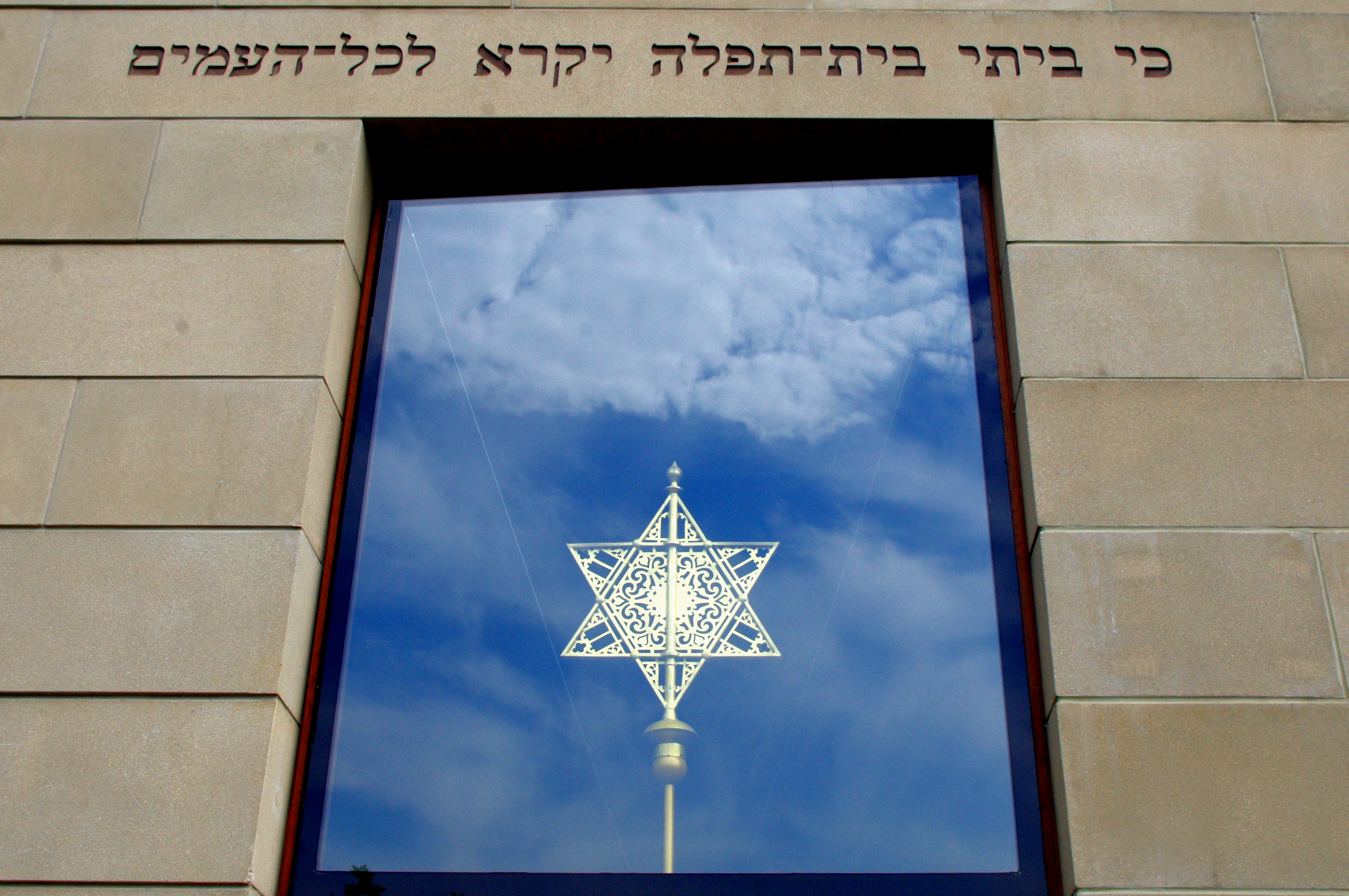
The Star of David finial from the Semper Synagogue, installed on the New Synagogue

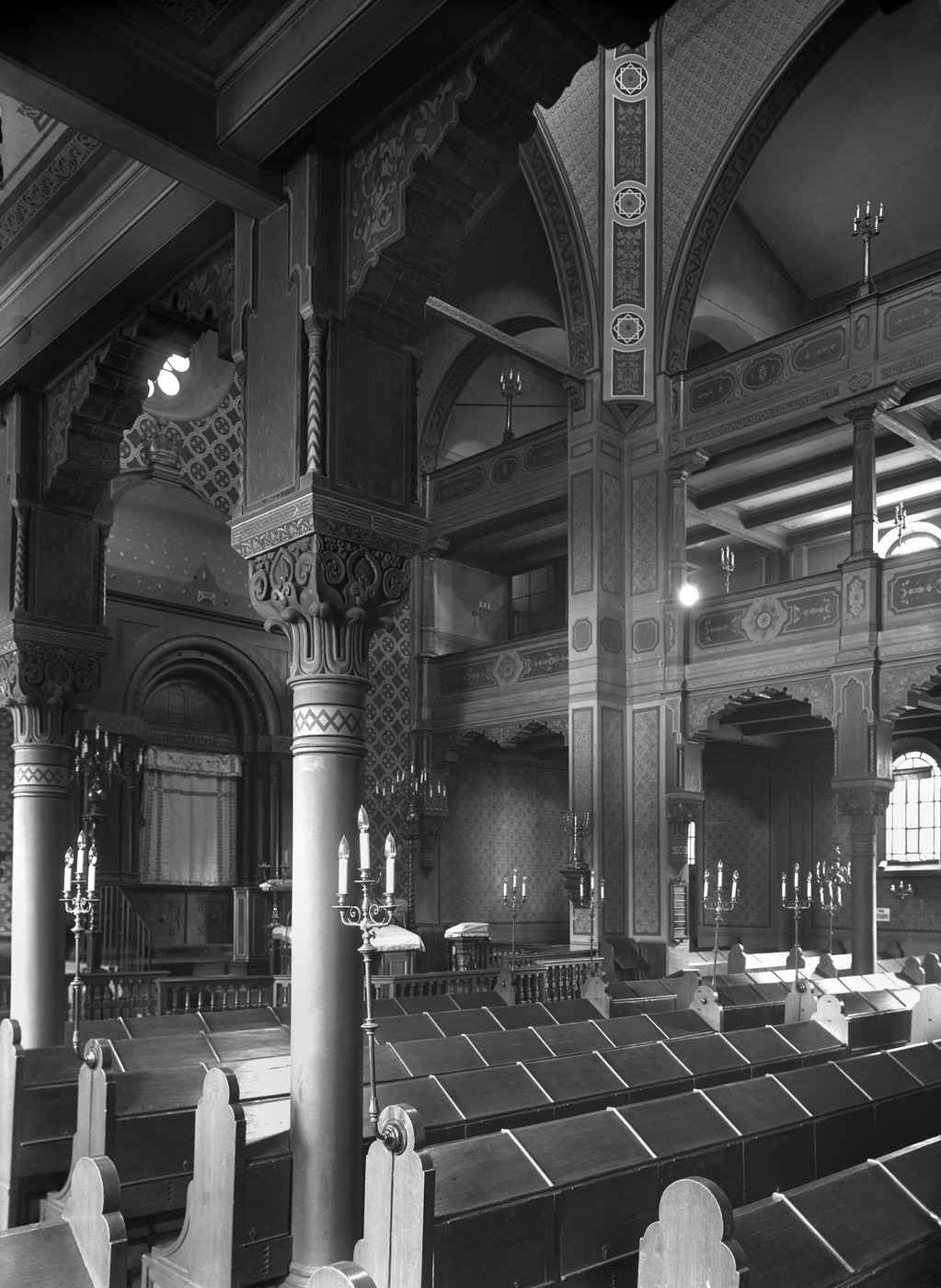
Interior of the synagogue in 1898

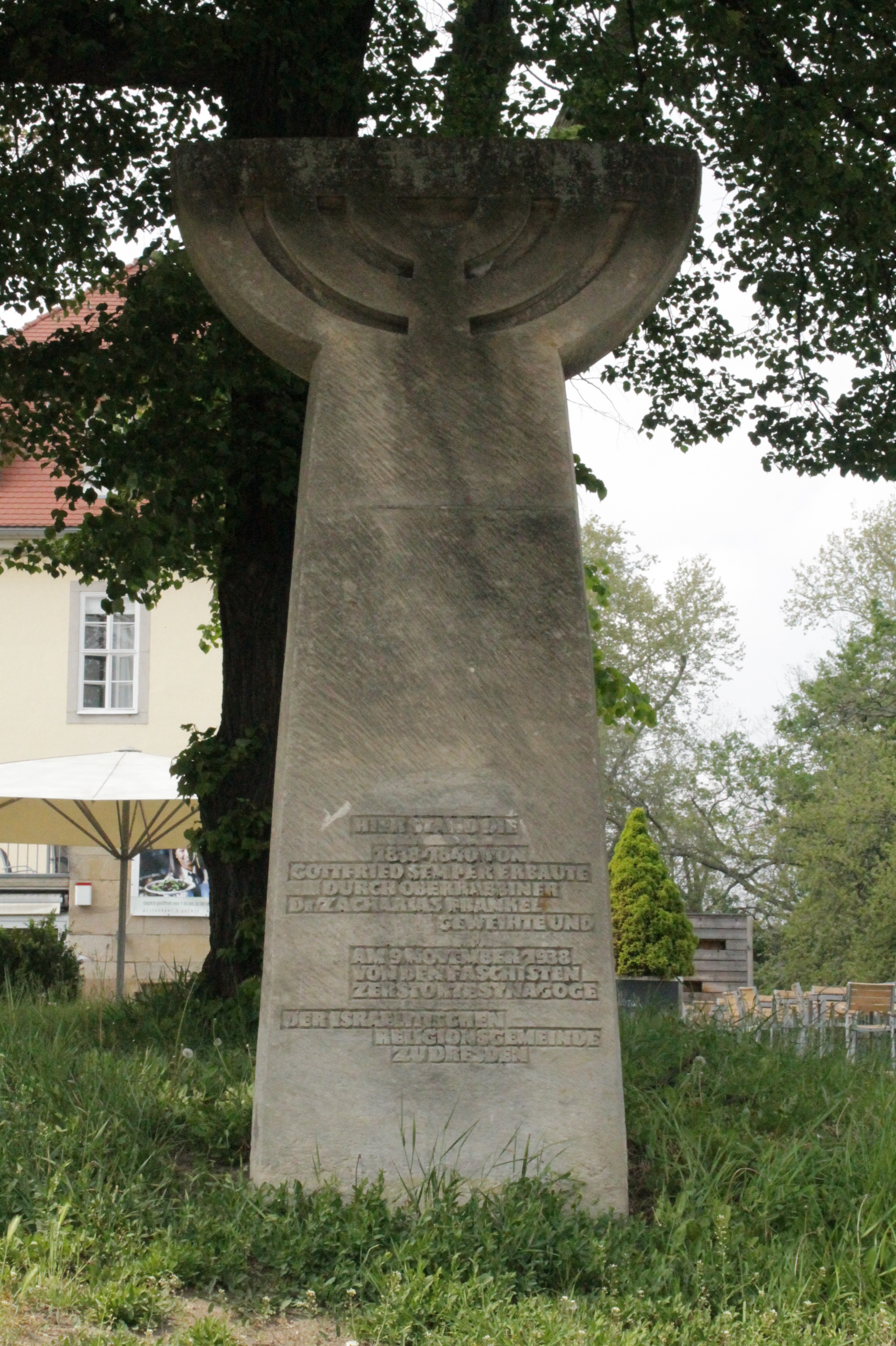
Monument to the destruction of the synagogue on Kristallnacht

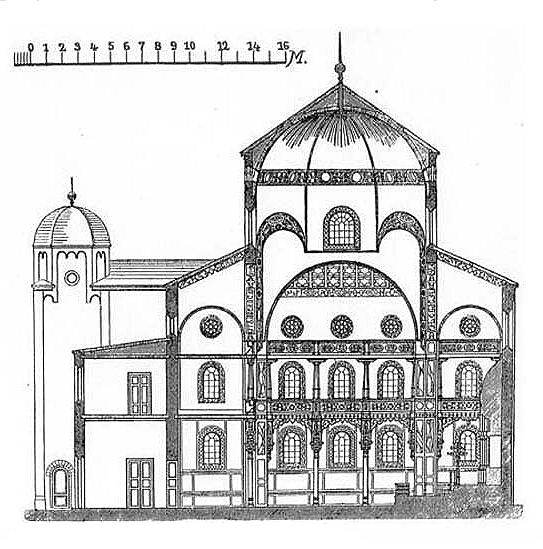
Cross-section, from Ludwig Klasen:‘‘Grundrißvorbilder‘‘. Abth. XI: Gebäude für kirchliche Zwecke. Leipzig 1889

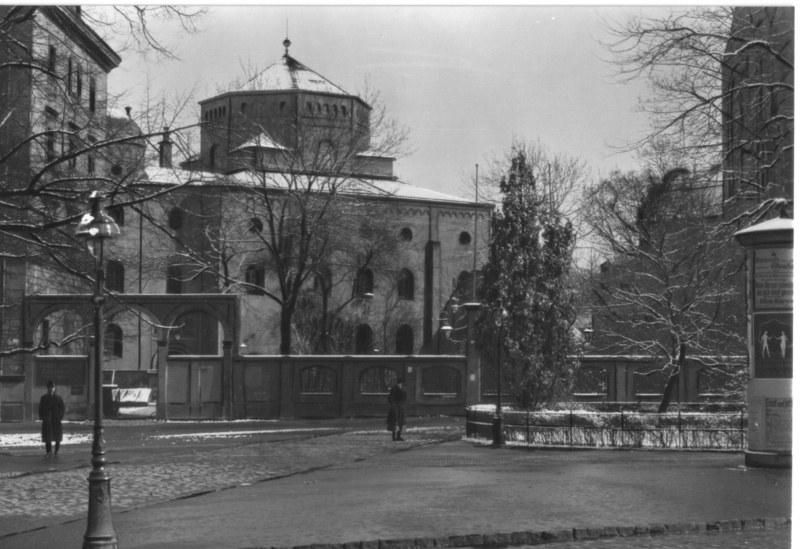
Photograph from 1910.

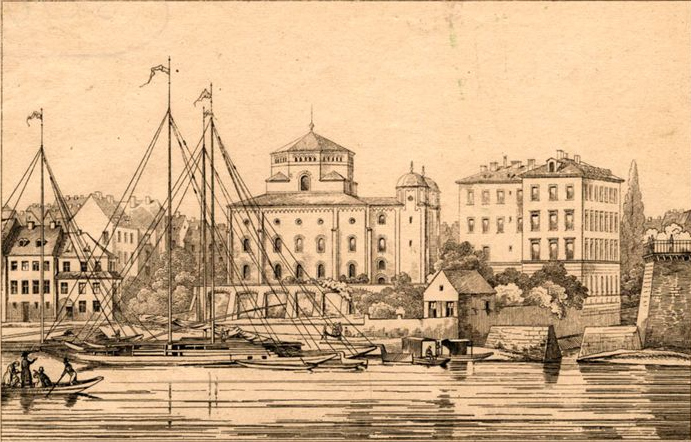
A view of the synagogue Published in the Allgemeine Bauzeitung in 1847

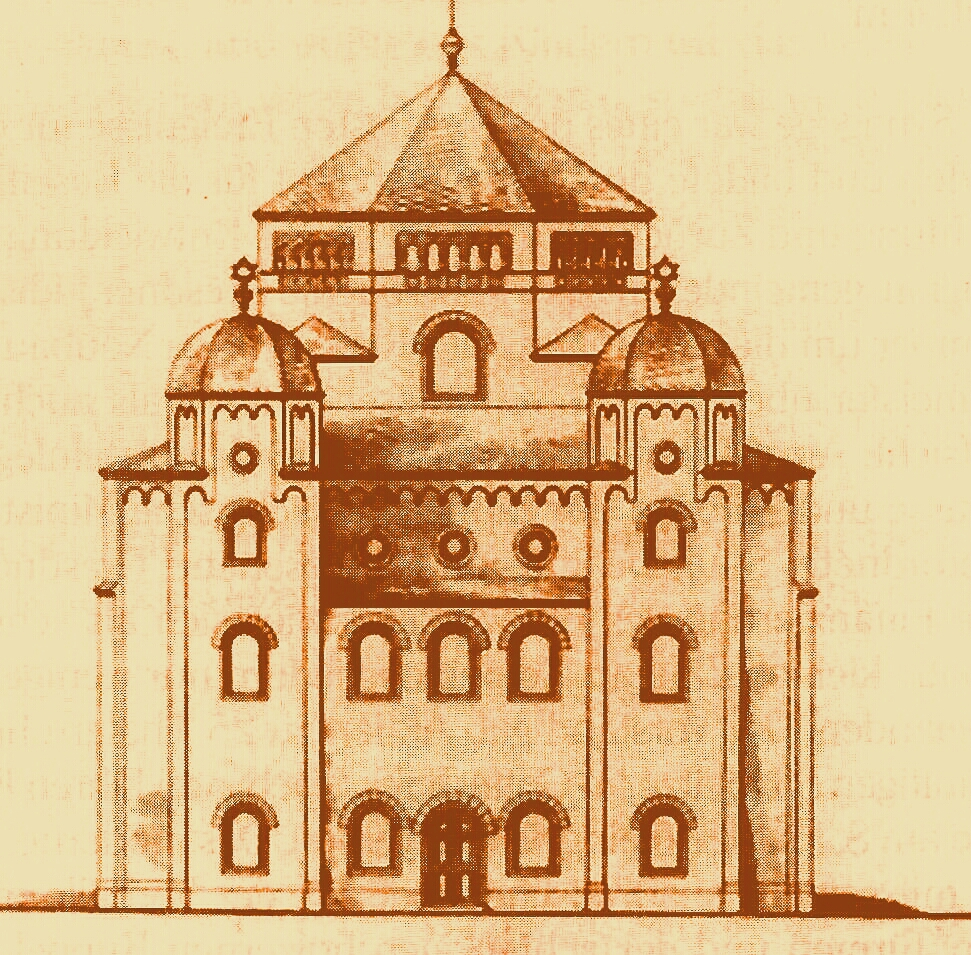
From Kerstin Hagemeyer, Jüdisches Leben in Dresden. Ausstellung anlässlich der Weihe der neuen Synagoge Dresden am 9. November 2001. SLUB Dresden, Berlin 2002, S. 69 Ansicht der Neuen Synagoge zu Dresden, Allgemeine Bauzeitung 12 (1847).- Blatt 105

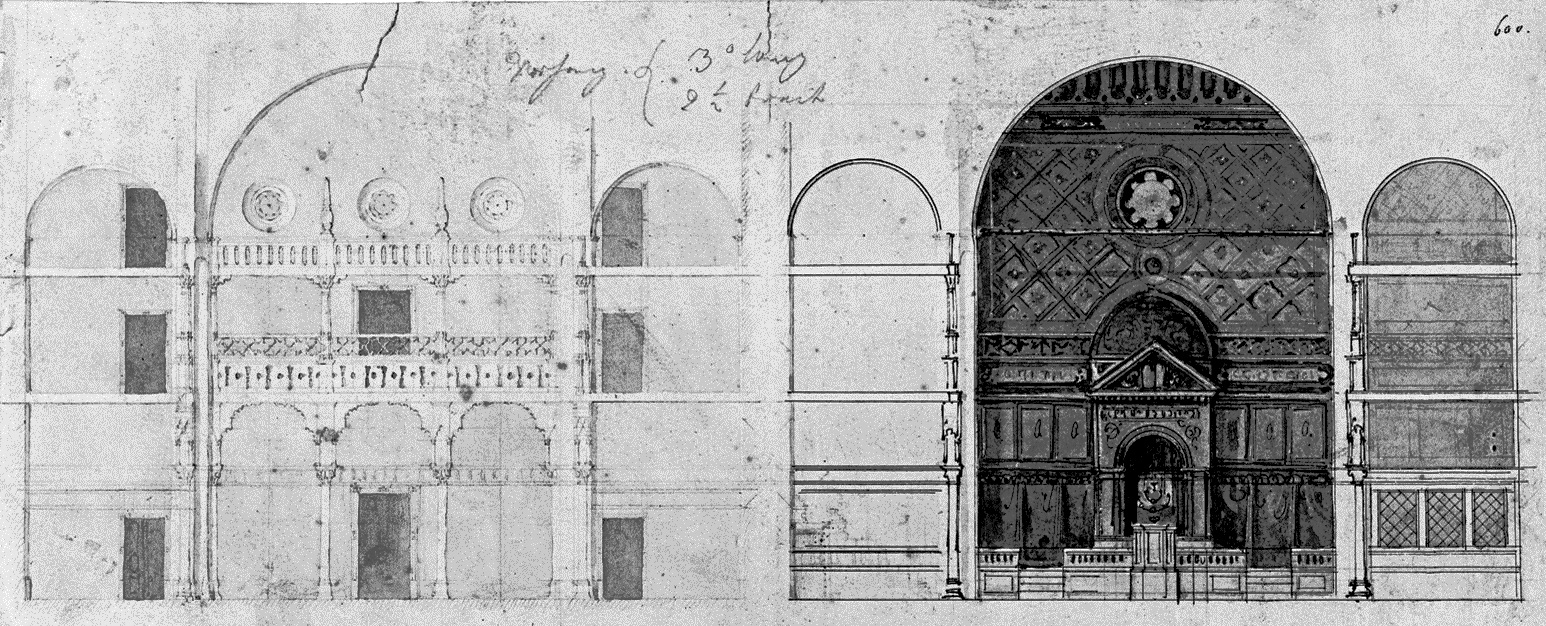

== See also ==
- History of the Jews in Germany
- List of Jewish architects
- List of synagogues in Germany (in German)
