= Adam Holland =

Adam Holland may refer to:

- Adam Holland (rower)
- Adam Holland (runner)

== See also ==
- Adam Cayton-Holland, American stand-up comedian
