= Rikl =

Rikl is a Czech surname. Notable people with the surname include:

- David Rikl (born 1971), Czech tennis player
- Patrik Rikl (born 1999), Czech tennis player, son of David

== See also ==
- Rik (given name)
