= Sanctuary lamp =

Float lamps used in churches or temples

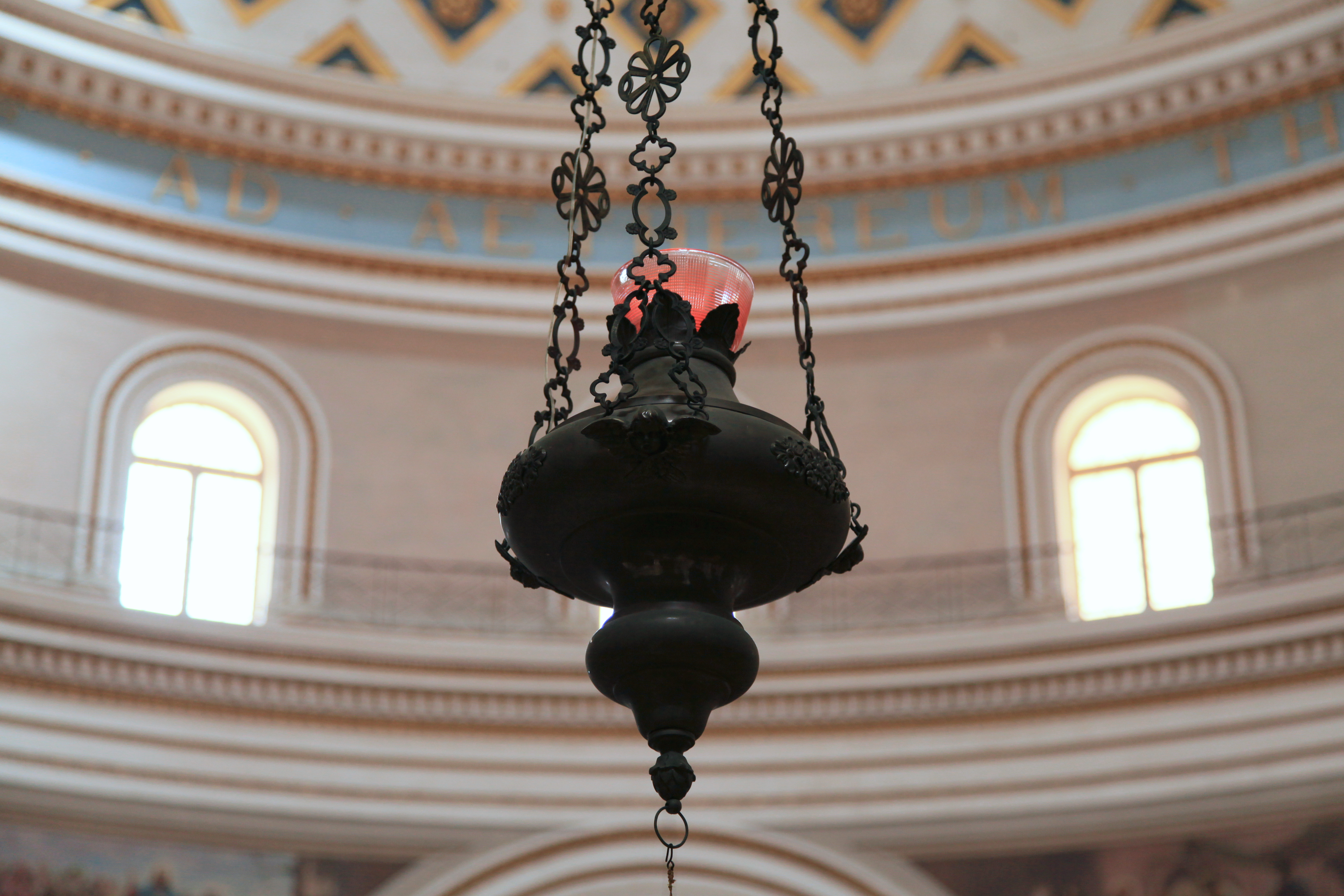
Chancel lamp in the Sanctuary Basilica of the Assumption of Our Lady, Malta

A sanctuary lamp, chancel lamp, altar lamp, everlasting light, or eternal flame is a light that shines before the altar of sanctuaries in many Jewish and Christian places of worship. Prescribed in Exodus 27:20-21 of the Torah, this item has taken on different meanings in each of the religions that have adopted it. The passage, which is part of prescriptions for the Tabernacle, states:

And thou shalt command the children of Israel, that they bring thee pure oil olive beaten for the light, to cause the lamp to burn always. In the tabernacle of the congregation without the veil, which is before the testimony, Aaron and his sons shall order it from evening to morning before the LORD: it shall be a statute for ever unto their generations on the behalf of the children of Israel. (KJV)

== In Jewish tradition ==
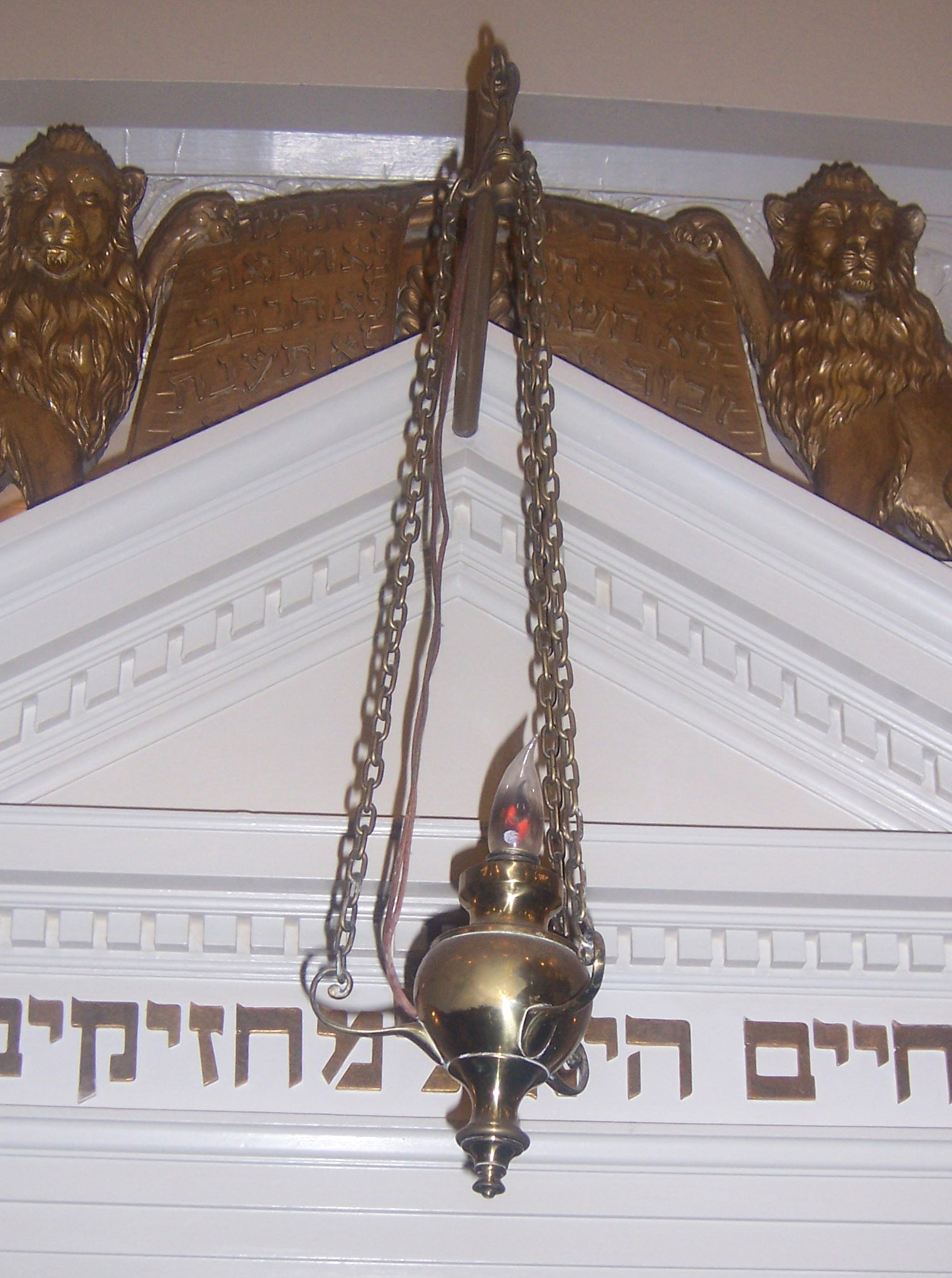
An electric ner tamid hanging over the ark in a synagogue

In Judaism, the sanctuary lamp is known as a Ner Tamid (Hebrew, “eternal flame” or “eternal light”), Hanging or standing in front of the ark in every Jewish synagogue, it is meant to represent the menorah of the Temple in Jerusalem, as well as the perpetual fire kept on the Altar of Burnt Offerings (mizbe'ah) of the Temple.

=== Hanukkah story ===
The eternal light is central to one of many stories behind the celebration of the Jewish festival of Hanukkah. When the ancient Maccabees rebelled and reclaimed the Temple in Jerusalem, they rekindled the eternal light. However, there was only enough oil to keep the flame burning for one day, and it took eight days to bring new oil. Miraculously, according to the narrative in the Talmud, the flame continued burning until new oil arrived.

Modern Jewish celebrations of Hanukkah include lighting a Hanukkah menorah (hanukkiyah), which has nine branches. This includes the shamash used to light the other eight flames (candles or oil wicks), evoking the story.

=== Other ===
In the United States, the Boy Scout Jewish religious emblem, a medal earned by scouts for meeting certain requirements of religious activity and education, is called the Ner Tamid.

== In Christian tradition ==
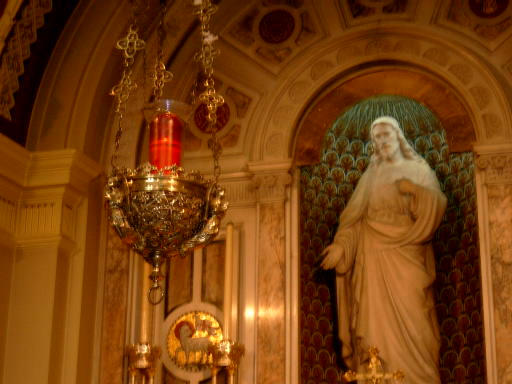
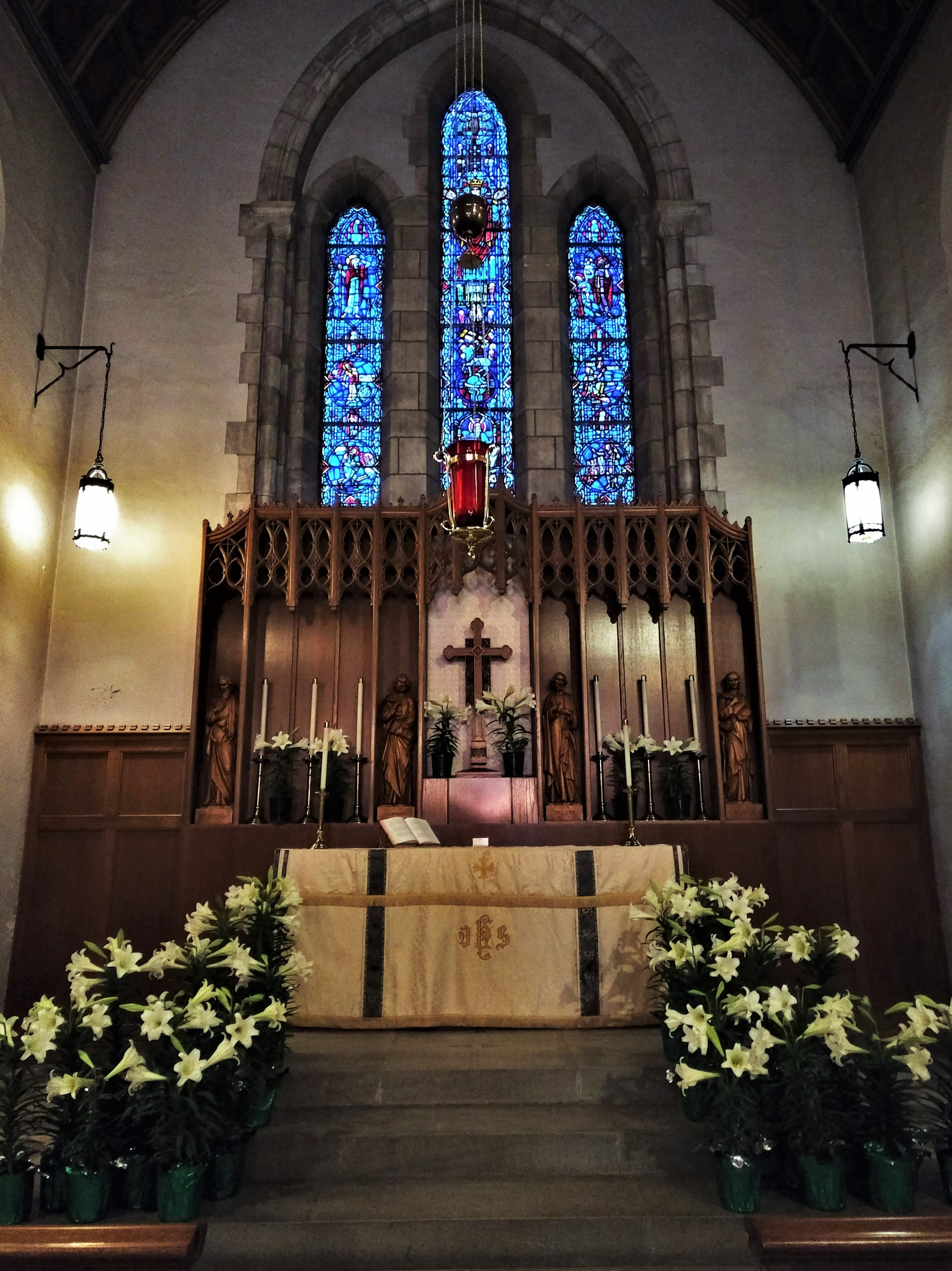
Sanctuary lamps depicted in a Roman Catholic church (top image) and Lutheran church (bottom image)

Some Christian churches have at least one lamp continually burning before the tabernacle, not only as an ornament, but for the purpose of worship. The General Instruction of the Roman Missal of the Catholic Church, for instance, states (in 316): “In accordance with traditional custom, near the tabernacle a special lamp, fueled by oil or wax, should be kept alight to indicate and honor the presence of Christ.” The sanctuary lamp, also called a chancel lamp, is placed before the tabernacle or aumbry in Roman Catholic and Old Catholic churches as a sign that the Blessed Sacrament is reserved or stored. It is also found in the chancel of Lutheran churches to indicate the presence of Christ in the sanctuary, as well as a belief in the Real Presence of Christ in the Eucharist; in Lutheran churches with a tabernacle or aumbry, it further indicates that the Eucharist is reserved. Depending on the churchmanship of the congregation, Anglican churches may have a chancel lamp to indicate the presence of Christ in the church or in churches that practice it, it may indicate that the Eucharist has been reserved in a tabernacle or aumbry. When used in Methodist churches, it indicates the presence of Jesus in the church. The sanctuary lamp may also be found in Eastern Orthodox Churches. Other Christian denominations burn the lamp to show that the light of Christ always burns in a sin-darkened world. A main influence from Judaism in the Old Testament is when God instructed Moses to have a lamp with pure oil perpetually burn in the Tabernacle (Exodus 27:20-21). This is the precedent for the Catholic custom of burning a candle before the tabernacle, which should be immobile and locked to prevent theft and Host desecration, and such a candle is also brought along when transporting the Sacrament anywhere.

Such sanctuary or tabernacle lamps are most often coloured red, though this is not prescribed. This serves to distinguish this light from various other votive lights within the church. In the Catholic Church, red is widely used despite the preference for white expressed by Fortescue. The custom of multiple lights in odd numbers (i.e., three, five, seven, or more) in place of a single lamp has become rarer, though it is still seen in some older Catholic churches and in Eastern Christianity. The lamp may hang by rope or chain over the tabernacle or near the entry of the sanctuary, or affixed to a wall; it may also be on a ledge or the altar gradine right beside the tabernacle, or on its own nearby stand placed on the floor, as seen in the image of St. Martin's Church, Kortrijk, Belgium, in the article Church tabernacle. Oil lamps or candles may be used, while electric ones are seen.

== In art ==
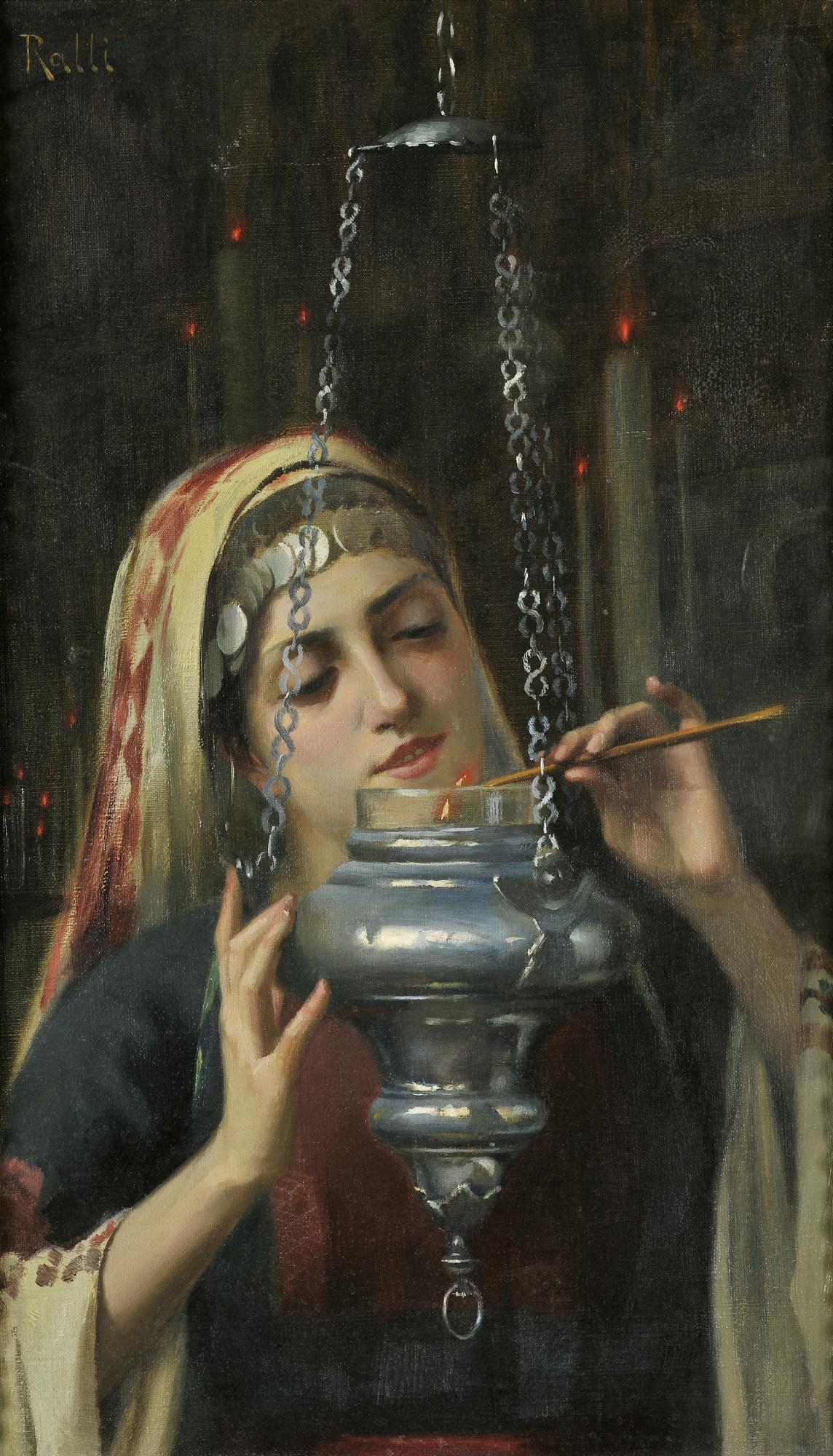
Church Interior by Théodore Jacques Ralli, 1893, woman lighting sanctuary lamp in an Eastern Orthodox Church.

Contemporary blown glass and bronze ner tamid by artist David Ascalon

== See also ==
- Eternal flame
