= Adam Holland (runner) =

English distance runner

Adam John Holland
Personal information
- Nickname: Tango
- Born: 1987 (age 38–39) Plymouth, Devon, England
- Height: 5 ft 11 in (180 cm)

Sport
- Country: Great Britain
- Club: Tavistock AC

Achievements and titles
- Personal bests: 5 km: 15:18; 10 km: 31:41; Half marathon: 1:08:49; Marathon: 2:27:55
- Updated on 15 April 2026

Adam ‘Tango’ Holland (born 1987) is an English distance runner who has won over 400 marathons and ultra-marathons. In 2010, he became the youngest person to complete 100 marathons in Europe, doing so at the age of 23. Six years later, he set a new record for the fastest cumulative time to complete 10 marathons in 10 days, doing so in over an hour quicker than the previous record. He later beat his own record in 2017, setting a time of 27 hours, 38 minutes and 36 seconds, almost another hour quicker again. He has won more marathons and ultra-marathons than any other runner in Great Britain, and the fourth most of anyone in the world.

== Biography ==
Adam Holland was born in 1987, in Plymouth, a city on the edge of Dartmoor in Devon, England. At the age of 18, he ran his first marathon, the 2005 Abingdon Marathon. He finished 248th, in a time of 3:36:32. He ran a modest amount of marathons over the subsequent two years; two in 2006 and three in 2007. However, his volume significantly increased in 2008, when he ran 25 marathons in one year, and he completed over thirty in each of the following two years. to run 100 marathons, his 100th being at the Eden Project Marathon on 10 October 2010. In doing so, he became the youngest person to run 100 marathons. At the age of 23, he beat the previous record, held by Steve Edwards, who completed his 100th marathon at the age of 28.

In 2016, Holland took part in the Saxon Shore Marathon Series in Kent, where he ran 10 marathons in 10 days. His average time for the marathons was 2:51:44, giving him a cumulative time of 28 hours, 37 minutes and 19 seconds. This beat the previous 10-in-10 record, set by Rik Vercoe in 2013, by over an hour. Holland subsequently beat his own record the following year at Lake Orta, completing the races in 27 hours, 38 minutes and 36 seconds, an average of 2:45:52. Also in 2017, Holland won the British 50 km Championships, in a time of 3:19:02; with a winning margin of just five seconds over Rob Weekes. He has won over 200 marathons and ultra-marathons, a total which ranks him fourth in the world, and is the most of anyone in Great Britain. He runs for Tavistock AC, who granted him life membership in 2017.
