= Saint Martin's Church, Kortrijk =

Coordinates: 50°49′39.5″N 3°16′6″E

Saint Martin's Church
- Dutch: Sint-Maartenskerk
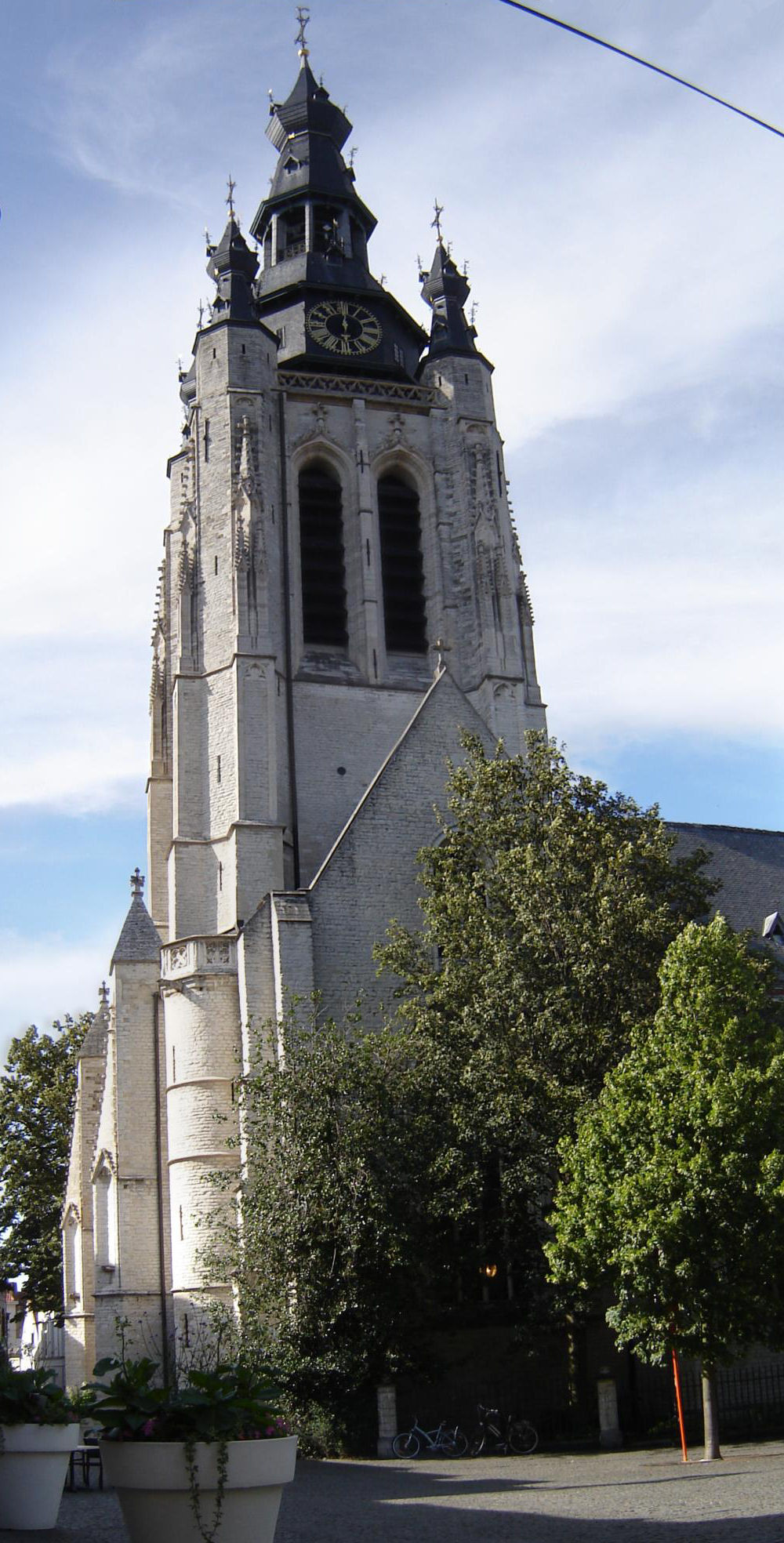
- Saint Martin's Church
- Location: Kortrijk (Courtrai)
- Country: Belgium
- Denomination: Roman Catholic Church

History
- Founded: 1390

Architecture
- Heritage designation: Monument
- Style: Gothic architecture
- Completed: 1390

Specifications
- Height: 83 m

Saint Martin's Church (Dutch: Sint-Maartenskerk) is the main Roman Catholic church and one of the principal Gothic monuments of Kortrijk (Courtrai), West Flanders, Belgium. The church is dedicated to Saint Martin of Tours.

== History ==
The first Gothic Saint Martin's Church was burned down after the Battle of Rozenbeke. This church was located at the place where a Roman church once stood (built in 650). The second church was built between 1390 and 1466, some remnants of which were incorporated in the present day church and remain visible. In 1585, the famous Sacramental tower was constructed in the choir. The current bell tower dates from the 19th century, a rebuilding after a fire in 1862 ruined the choir and major parts of the roof and tower.

The church holds many artworks by Flemish masters including by Gaspar de Crayer and Bernaert de Rijckere. The organ, dating to 1888, is made by Pierre Schyven.

== Gallery ==
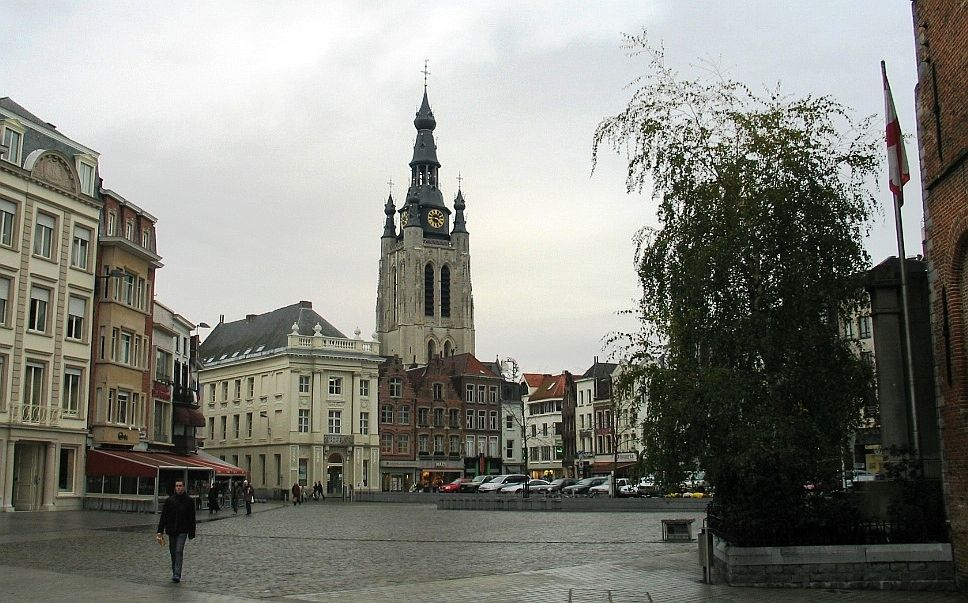
Grote Markt (main square) of Kortrijk with Saint-Martin's Church

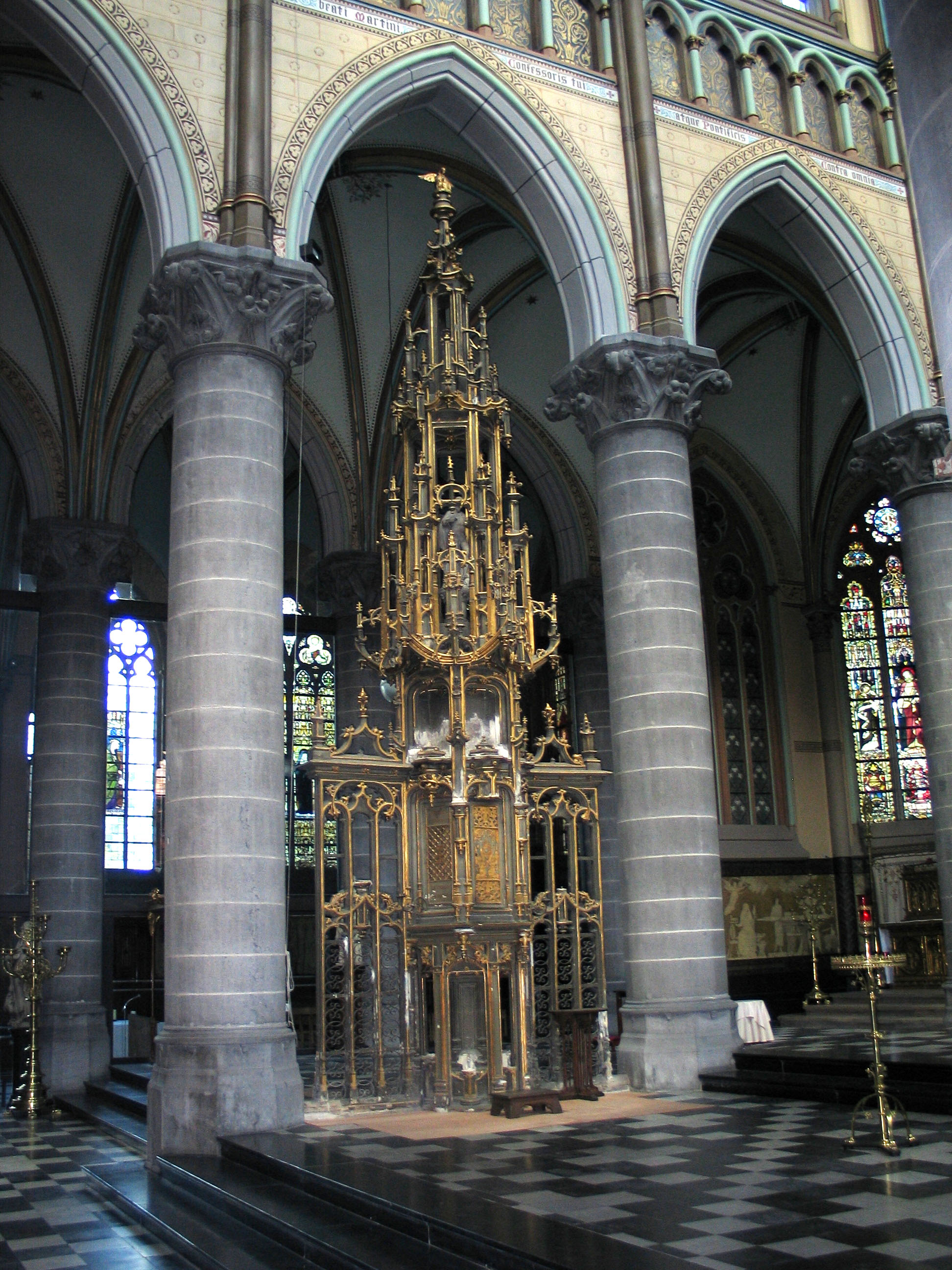
The 'Sacrament' tower inside Saint Martin's Church

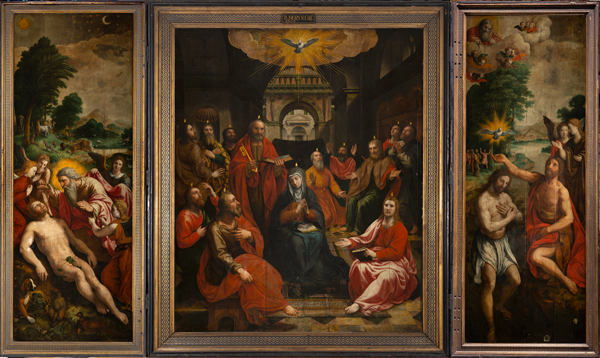
Triptych by Bernaert de Rijckere
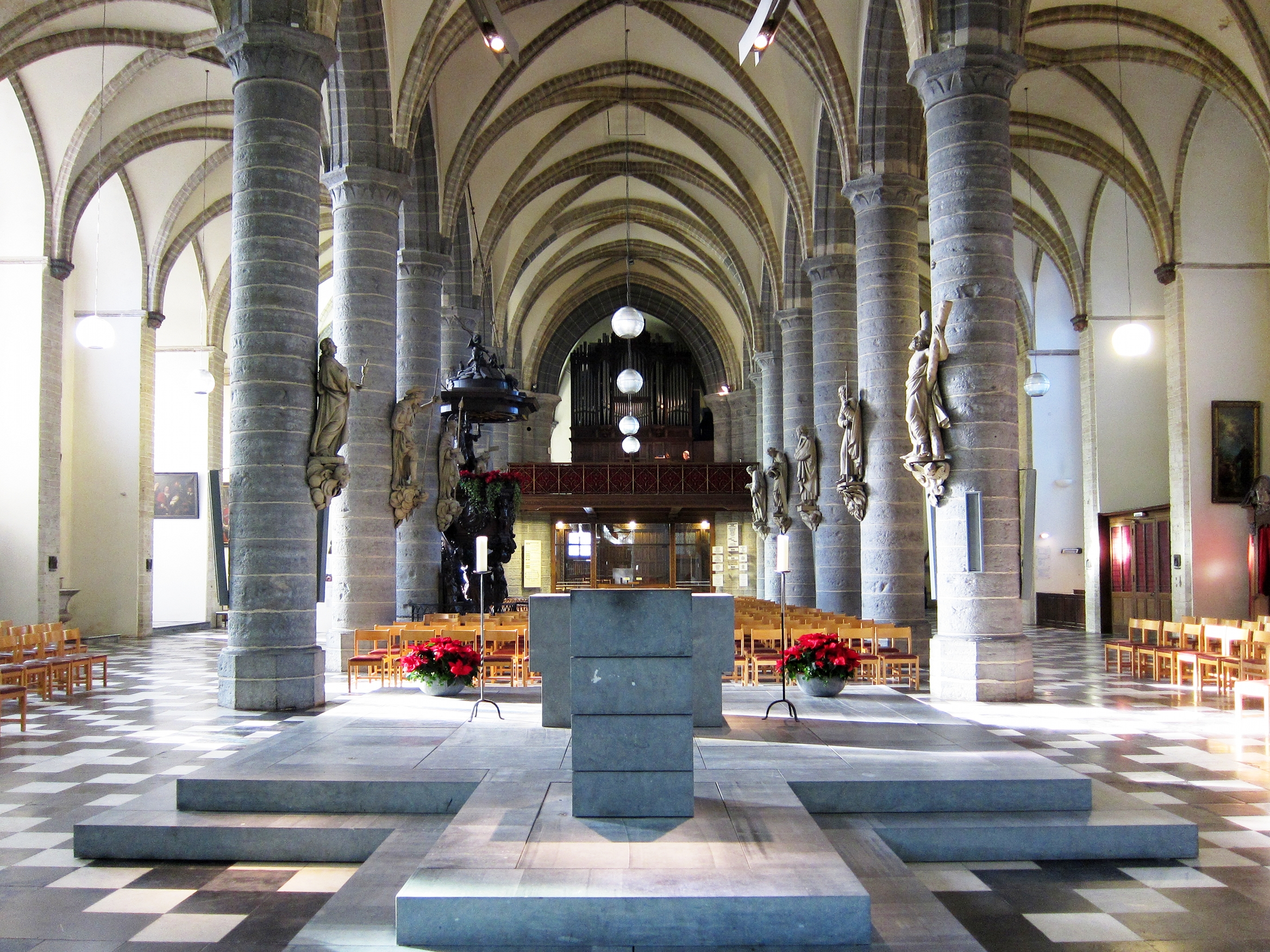
Interior

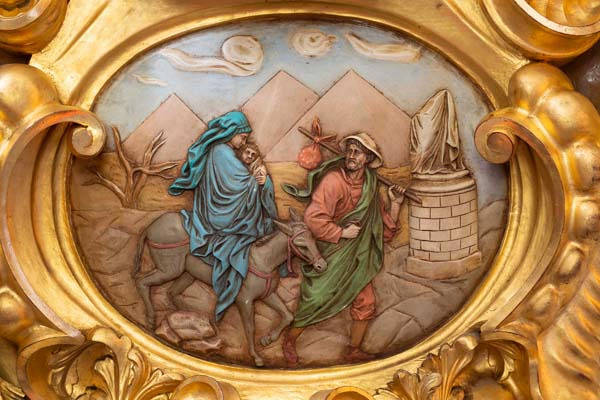
Altarpiece (detail)

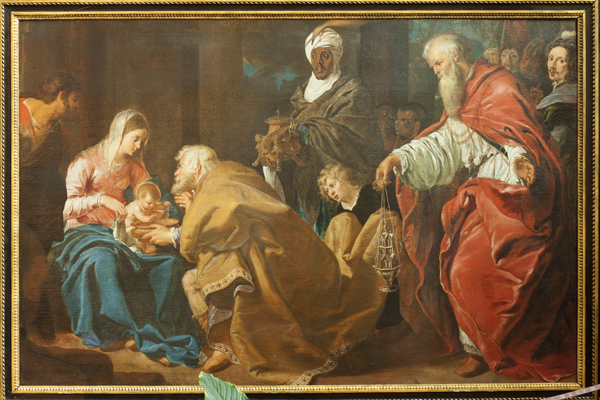
Adoration of the Magi by Gaspar de Crayer

== See also ==
- List of tallest structures built before the 20th century
