= Abraham de Rijcke =

Flemish Renaissance painter (1566–1599)

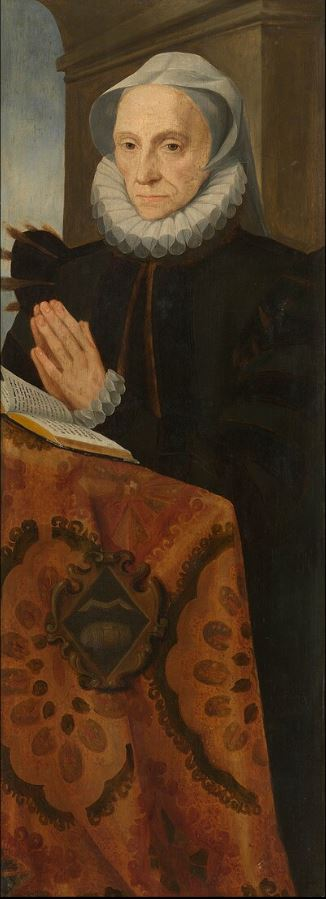
Portrait of Marie le Batteur praying

Abraham de Rijcke (Antwerp, baptized on 5 July 1566 – 1599) was a Flemish Renaissance painter known for his history paintings and portraits.

== Life ==
Abraham de Rijcke was born in Antwerp as the eldest son of Bernaert de Rijckere and Maria Boots. His father was a painter from Kortrijk who was active in Antwerp as a history and portrait painter. Abraham trained with his father along with his younger brother Daniel.

He became the guardian of his younger siblings on the death of his father in 1590. It is believed that Abraham and his brother Daniel were important contributors to works produced in their father's workshop.

De Rijcke died in Antwerp before 19 August 1599, the day his younger brother Daniel was appointed guardian of his surviving siblings.

== Work ==
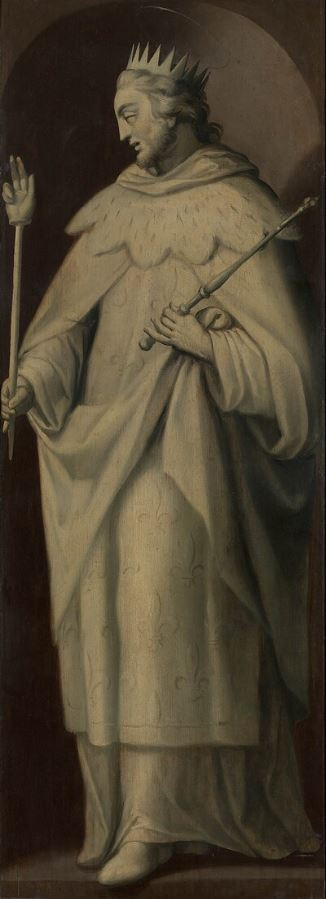
St Louis IX, King of France

Very few works of Abraham de Rijcke are known. He painted an altarpiece for the St. James' Church, Antwerp of which the central panel represented the crucifixion (now lost). The side panels are portraits of Jan Baptist Doncker and Magdalena Hockaert praying and wearing black clothes.

This altarpiece is the basis for an attribution of an altarpiece in the Royal Museum of Fine Arts Antwerp to Abraham de Rijcke. The altarpiece was part of the funeral monument of Lodewijk Clarys and Marie le Batteur originally situated in the Cathedral of Our Lady (Antwerp). This diptych shows on the outside panels the portraits of Lodewijk Clarys and Marie le Batteur with their hands in prayer. The backside of the panels show respectively the figure of the Madonna and St Louis IX, King of France in grisaille.
