= Rik Lopez =

English footballer

Personal information
- Date of birth: 25 December 1979 (age 46)
- Place of birth: Northwick Park, England
- Position: Full back

Youth career
- 1996–1997: Arsenal
- 1997–2000: Queens Park Rangers
- 2000–2001: Watford

Senior career*
Years	Team	Apps	(Gls)
2001–2002	Bristol Rovers	8	(0)
- * Club domestic league appearances and goals as of 02:55, 11 March 2010 (UTC)

Rik Lopez (born 25 December 1979 in Northwick Park) is an English retired professional footballer.

== Career ==
Lopez began as an apprentice at Arsenal, and also played youth football with Queens Park Rangers and Watford. However, he never made a league appearance for any of the three clubs. Lopez began his professional career with Bristol Rovers, making eight league appearances during the 2001–02 season.
