= Rik (given name) =

Rik is a masculine given name and nickname. Most common in Belgium, it is a short form of the Dutch language given name Hendrik or sometimes Frederik, Erik or Rikkert. As an English-language name it usually is a variant of Rick.

Notable people with this name include:

- Rik Barnett (born 1990), English actor
- Rik Battaglia, stage name of Italian actor Caterino Bertaglia (1927–2015)
- Bert Blyleven né Rik Aalbert (born 1951), Dutch-born American baseball pitcher
- Rik Bonness (born 1954), American football player
- Rik van den Boog (born 1959), Dutch managing director of FC Ajax
- Rik Carey (born 1966), Bahamian musician (short form of Patrick)
- Rik Clerckx (1936–1985), Belgian long-distance runner
- Rik Coolsaet (born 1951), Belgian political scientist
- Rik Coppens (1930–2015), Belgian footballer
- Rik Cordero (born 1979), American film director
- Rik Daems (born 1959), Belgian politician and painter
- Rik Daniëls (born 1962), Belgian television director
- Rik De Deken (1907–1960), Belgian footballer
- Rik De Saedeleer (1924–2013), Belgian footballer and sports commentator
- Rik de Voest (born 1980), South African tennis player
- Rik Emmett (born 1953), Canadian guitarist and singer
- Rik Fox (born 1955), American heavy metal bassist
- Rik Grashoff (born 1961), Dutch engineer and politician
- Rik Hoevenaers (1902–1958), Belgian cyclist
- Rik van IJzendoorn (born 1987), Dutch cyclist
- Rik Isemborghs (1914–1973), Belgian footballer
- Rik Jaeken (born 1949), Belgian engineer and businessman
- Rik Janssen (born 1957), Dutch politician and businessman
- Rik Kemp (born 1939), Australian cartoonist
- Rik Koen (born 2004), Dutch racing driver
- Rik Kuypers (1925–2019), Belgian film director
- Rik de Lange (born 1956), Dutch politician
- Rik Larnoe (1897–1978), Belgian footballer
- Rik Launspach (born 1958), Dutch actor, writer and director
- Rik Levins (died 2010), American comic book artist
- Rik Lopez (born 1979), English footballer
- Rik Makarem (born 1982), English actor
- Rik Mayall (1958–2014), English comedian
- Rik Massengale (born 1957), American golfer
- Rik Moorman (born 1961), Dutch cyclist
- Rik Offenberger (born 1964), American comic book journalist
- Rik Pinxten (born 1947), Belgian anthropologist
- Rik Renders (1922–2008), Belgian cyclist
- Rik Rue (born 1950), Australian experimental musician
- Rik Schaefels (1827–1904), Belgian Romantic painter
- Rik Schaffer (born 1960s), American game composer
- Rik Schoofs (born 1950), Belgian long-distance runner
- Rik Sebens (born 1988), Dutch footballer
- Rik Simpson, British record producer
- Rik Smits (linguist) (born 1953), Dutch linguist, author, translator and editor
- Rik Smits (born 1966), Dutch NBA basketball player
- Rik Tommelein (born 1962), Belgian hurdler
- Rik Toonen (born 1954), Dutch water polo player
- Rik Torfs (born 1956), Belgian law scholar and politician
- Rik Van Brussel (born 1944), Belgian mechanical engineer
- Rik Van Linden (born 1949), Belgian cyclist
- Rik Van Looy (born 1933), Belgian cyclist
- Rik Van Nutter (1929–2005), American actor
- Rik Van Slycke (born 1963), Belgian cyclist
- Rik Van Steenbergen (1924–2003), Belgian cyclist
- Rik Vandenberghe (born 1953), Belgian sprinter
- Rik Verbrugghe (born 1974), Belgian cyclist
- Rik Vercoe (born 1972), British ultramarathon runner
- Rik Verheye (born 1986), Flemish actor
- Rik Waddon (born 1977), British cyclist
- Rik Waller (born 1981), English singer
- Rik Wheeler, nickname of Mortimer Eric Wheeler (1890–1976), British archaeologist and army officer
- Rik Wilson (born 1962), American ice hockey player
- Rik Wouters (1882–1916), Belgian painter and sculptor

Fictional characters include:

- Rik Ringers, eponymic comics reporter

== See also ==
- Rijk de Gooyer (1925–2011), Dutch actor
- Rikk Agnew (born 1958), American rock musician
