= Liberal Judaism =

Liberal Judaism may refer to:

- Reform Judaism, a religiously liberal worldwide Jewish movement, widely also known as "Liberal Judaism"
- Nederlands Verbond voor Progressief Jodendom (Liberal Judaism (Netherlands)), the Dutch branch of Reform Judaism
- Liberal Judaism (United Kingdom), one of the British branches of Reform
- (Sometimes) non-Orthodox branches of Judaism collectively, including the above as well as Conservative Judaism, Reconstructionist Judaism etc.
