= Bernaert de Rijckere =

Flemish painter (c.1535–1590)

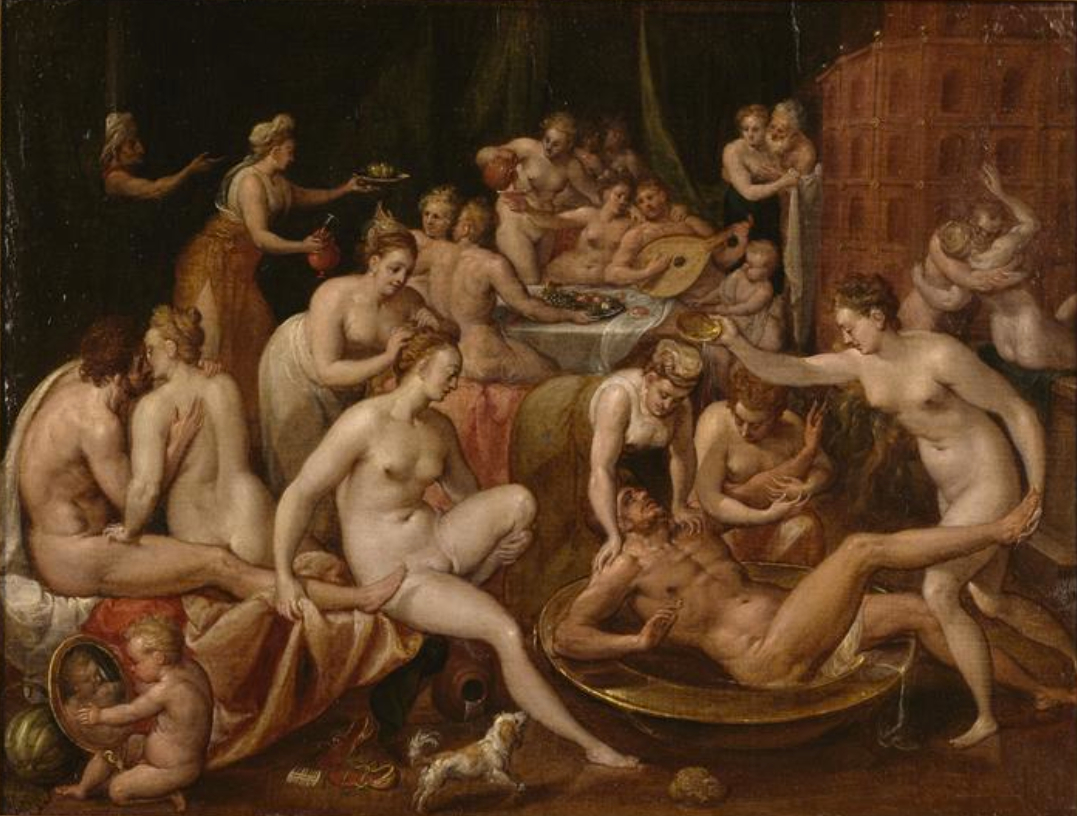
Feast of the Gods

Bernaert de Rijckere (c. 1535 – 1590) was a Flemish Renaissance painter known for his history paintings and portraits.

== Life ==
De Rijckere was born in Kortrijk as the son of Dierick de Ryckere (died 1581) and Mayken van West. His father was a silversmith and goldsmith who was relatively well-off and was active in the local Chamber of rhetoric of which he became a deacon. It is not documented who de Rijckere's teacher was. His earliest documented work is the Jesus Christ bearing the Cross painted in 1560 for the altar of the rhetoricians in the Saint Martin's Church in Kortrijk where the work is still located. Shortly after the completion of this commission, de Rijckere moved to Antwerp where he joined the Guild of St. Luke as a master in 1561.

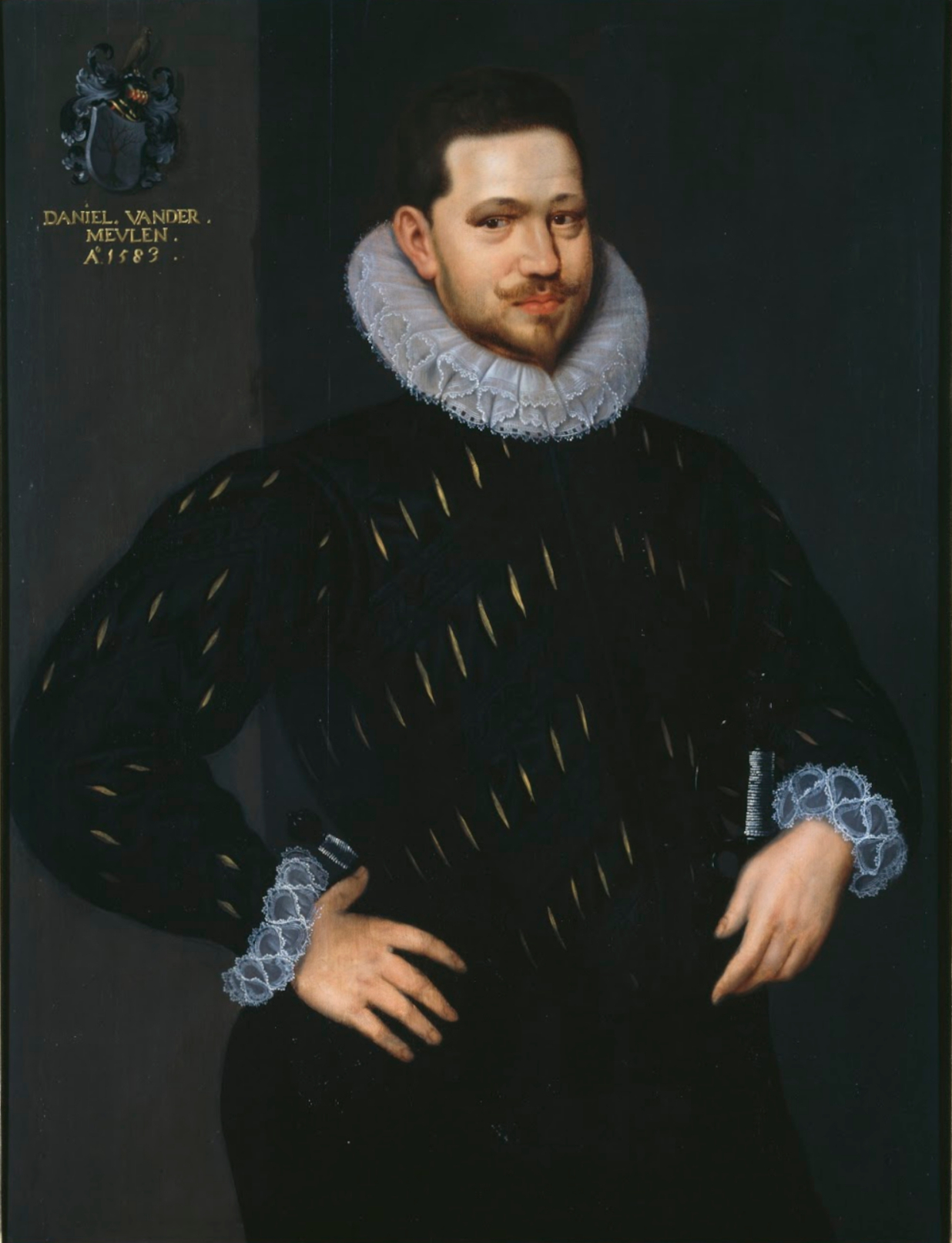
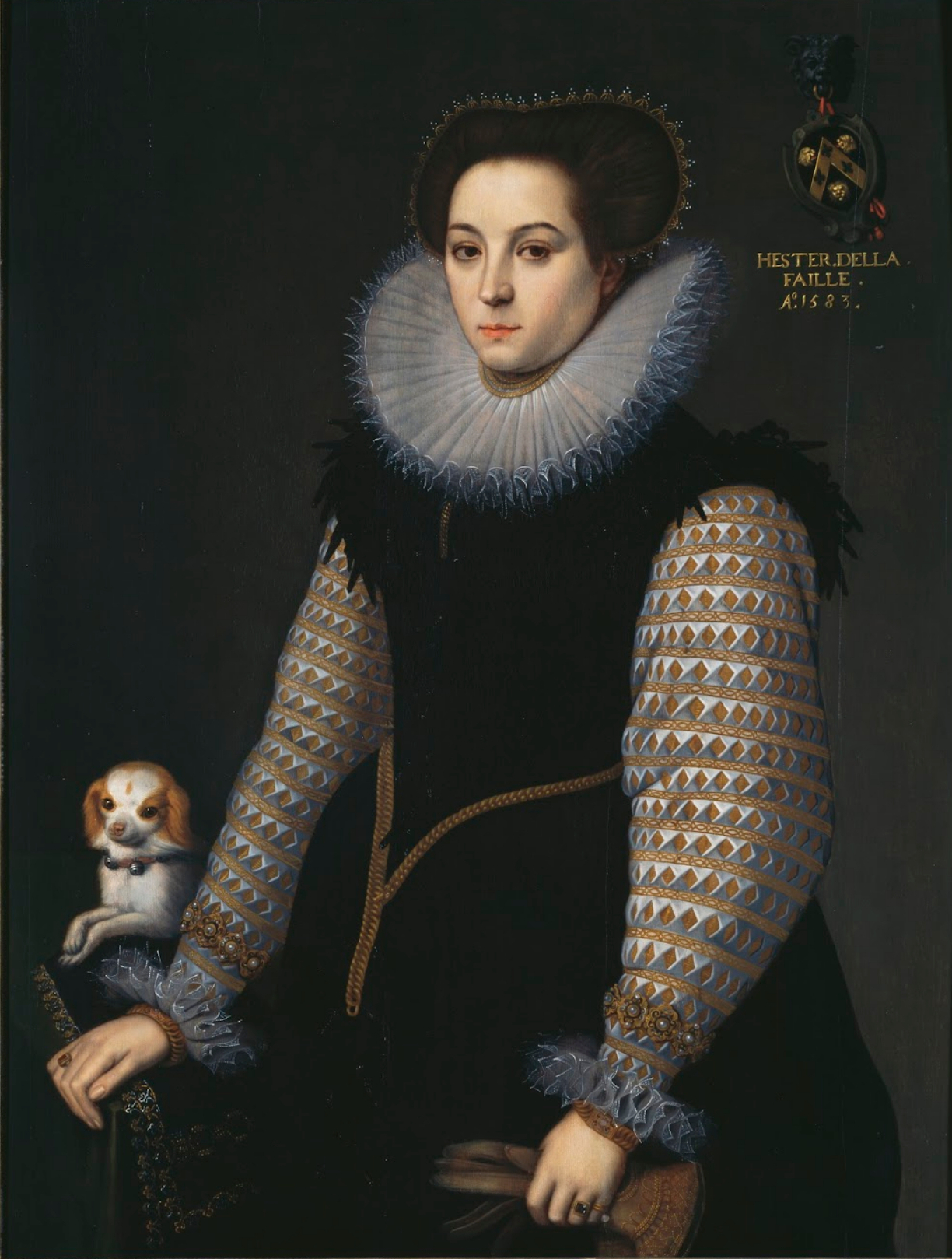
(left) Portrait of Daniël van der Meulen; (right) Portrait of Hester della Faille

De Rijckere appears to have had a close relationship with Anthonis Palermo, who was the deacon of the Antwerp Guild and was active as an artist as well as an art dealer. In 1563 he married Maria Boots, who was presumably well-off. He bought property in the Jodenstraat in Antwerp, where he lived most of his life. He would later buy more property in the Antwerp area, a sign of his prosperous circumstances, particularly after the death of his father. He became a member of the Antwerp Chamber of rhetoric De Violieren in 1585. His sons Abraham and Daniel both trained with him.

De Rijckere died in Antwerp in 1590.

== Work ==
De Rijckere is known for landscapes, portraits, Christian religious representations and mythical and allegorical paintings. He is now generally believed to be identical with the Monogrammist B, the author of drawings signed with the monogram B, a number of which are held by the Louvre Museum. However, the Dutch art historian Hessel Miedema believes the Monogrammist B should be identified with someone "in the circle of Bernaert de Rijckere" rather than with de Rijckere himself.

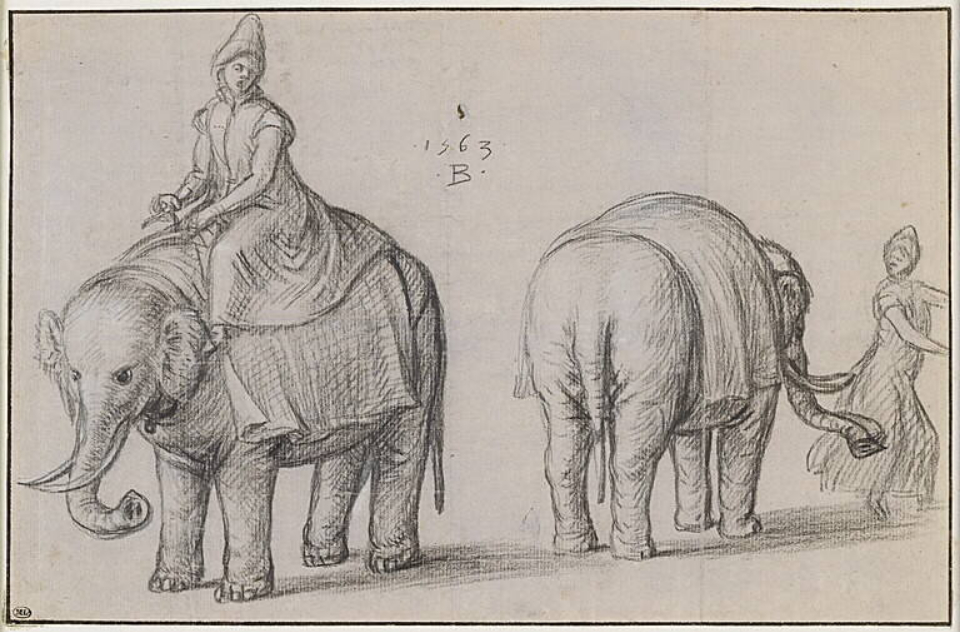
Two Studies of Elephants and their Keepers

On the basis of the drawings signed with the monogram B, a number of paintings have now been attributed to de Rijckere.

Only one of his works is currently still present in Antwerp, a Beheading of St Matthew in the Cathedral of Our Lady. There must have been more since Rubens owned a Feast of the Gods by him, one of the two Flemish Renaissance history paintings in Rubens’ estate (the other one was by Michiel Coxie). More works were located in his birthplace of Kortrijk. In 1585 he received a commission from the master of the Saint Martin's Church in Kortrijk for a triptych on the Pentecost, which he completed three years later. The work, showing a mature composition and rich palette, is still located in the church.

De Rijckere was also active as a copyist, an activity in which he was assisted by his sons. He copied works of Frans Floris, Maerten de Vos, Jan van Cleef, Willem Key, Cornelis van de Capelle and Gillis van Coninxloo. His output as a copyist was so large that he was regarded as a painting "manufacturer." His clients included Antwerp's prominent citizens.
