= Akiva Weingarten =

American-born liberal rabbi, raised a Satmar Hasid, later based in Dresden and Basel

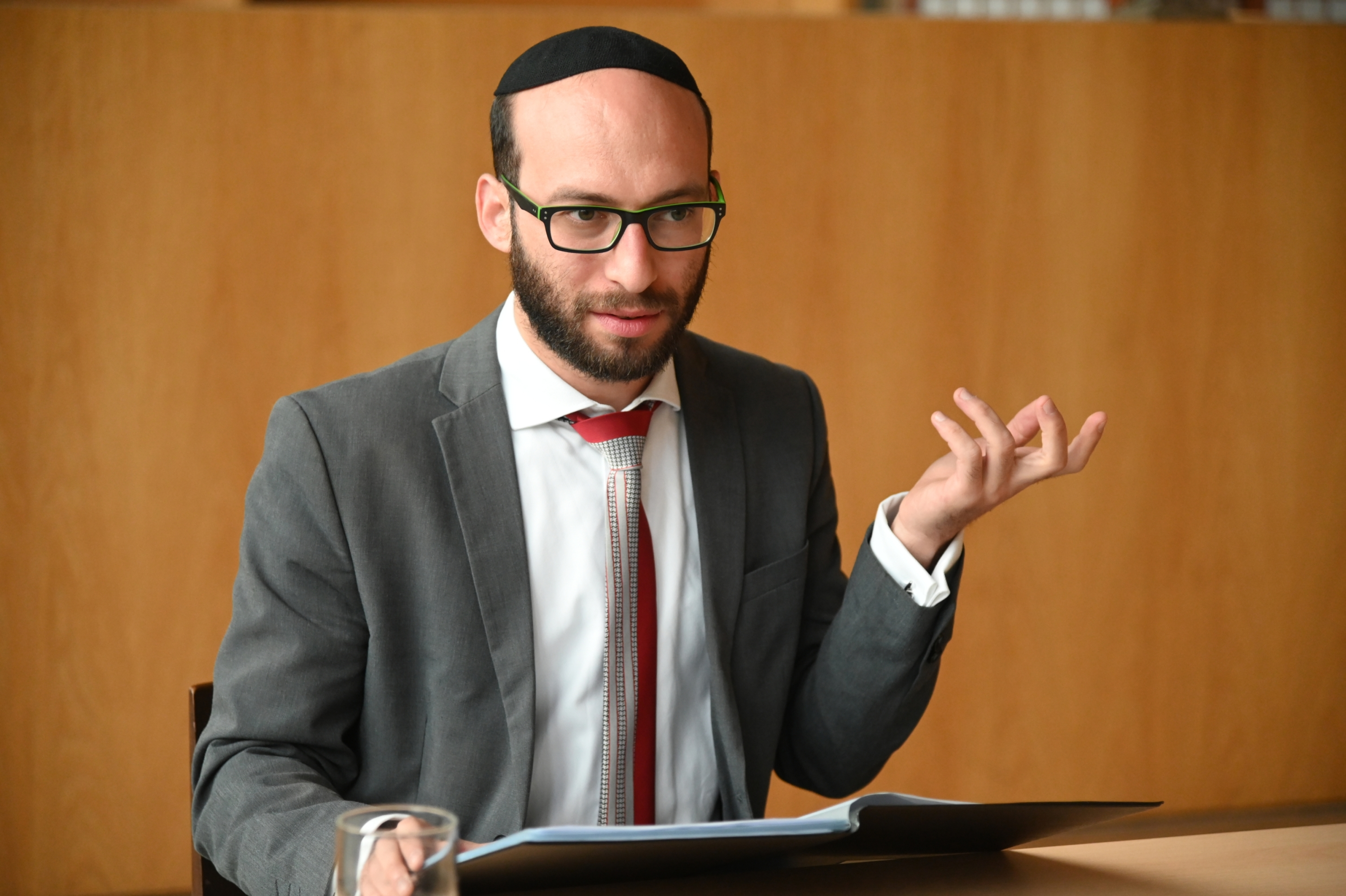
Rabbi Akiva Weingarten in Dresden (2019)

Rabbi Akiva Weingarten (born December 23, 1984, in Monsey, New York) is a German-American rabbi. He is the Liberal Chief Rabbi of Saxony and has served as rabbi of the Jüdische Kultusgemeinde Dresden since its establishment in 2021. Previously, he served as rabbi of the Jüdische Gemeinde zu Dresden from 2019 to 2021 and as rabbi of the Liberal Jewish community Migwan in Basel, Switzerland, from 2019 to 2024.

Weingarten is the founder of the Besht Yeshiva Dresden and has been involved in Jewish educational, cultural and community initiatives in Germany and Israel. He describes his religious approach as "liberal Hasidic", combining Hasidic spirituality, traditions and customs with liberal Jewish theology and communal practice.

He is particularly known for combining liberal Jewish religious practice with traditional Hasidic dress, including the shtreimel and kaftan, on Shabbat and Jewish holidays.

== Early life and education ==
Weingarten was born in Monsey, New York, and grew up in the Satmar Hasidic community in New York. He was the eldest of eleven siblings and grew up speaking Yiddish as his first language. His paternal family originated in Hungary, while his maternal ancestors came from Lithuania.

He studied in four yeshivot in New York and later in two yeshivot in Israel. He received his first rabbinic ordination at the age of 17. At the age of 18, he moved to Israel, where he lived in the predominantly ultra-Orthodox city of Bnei Brak for approximately ten years and received two further rabbinic ordinations.

At the age of 19, Weingarten became engaged and married at the age of 20. Later he became the father of three children.

From an early age, Weingarten questioned aspects of the religious environment in which he was raised. He has described frequently being removed from classes because of the critical questions he asked and has identified the freedom to ask questions as an important part of his later intellectual and religious development.

In 2014, Weingarten left Israel and the ultra-Orthodox community and moved to Germany. He studied Jewish Studies at the Free University of Berlin and the University of Potsdam.

== Rabbinical career ==
In 2017, Weingarten founded the liberal Hasidic community Besht-Berlin, where Kabbalat Shabbat services, Kiddush and joint study groups were held regularly.

In August 2019, Weingarten became rabbi of the Jüdische Gemeinde zu Dresden, succeeding Alexander Nachama. He served as rabbi of the community from 2019 until 2021.

From 2019 to 2024, Weingarten also served as rabbi of the Liberal Jewish community Migwan in Basel, Switzerland.

In 2021, Weingarten ended his contract with the Jüdische Gemeinde zu Dresden and initiated the founding of the Jüdische Kultusgemeinde Dresden as a new Jewish community in the city. He has served as its rabbi since its establishment.

The Jüdische Kultusgemeinde Dresden developed out of the Besht Yeshiva and was founded in autumn 2021. The community describes itself as combining liberal Jewish values with Hasidic traditions and spirituality.

== Chief Rabbi of Saxony ==
Since 2021, Weingarten has served as the "Liberal Chief Rabbi of Saxony". he was elected to this position by the "Landesverband Jüdischer Gemeinden und Einrichtungen in Sachsen e.V." as it's Liberal Chief Rabbi alongside Rabbi Esther Jonas-Märtin as the Masorti Chief Rabbi. The position is associated with the liberal Jewish religious leadership of Saxony and involves religious, educational and communal activities.

The Jüdische Kultusgemeinde Dresden describes Weingarten as its state and community rabbi and lists him as Landesrabbiner.

In this capacity, Weingarten has participated in Jewish educational programs, public events, interfaith dialogue and initiatives promoting Jewish religious and cultural life in Saxony.

== Besht Yeshiva Dresden ==
In April 2020, Weingarten founded the Besht Yeshiva Dresden, a Jewish educational institution in Dresden.

The yeshiva was established particularly to support young Jewish people who have left ultra-Orthodox communities and to help them integrate into German society while remaining connected to Judaism. Its educational model combines Jewish learning with social and professional integration.

The institution offers Jewish learning and educational programs and seeks to help former members of ultra-Orthodox communities build a new life in a liberal Jewish environment. Its activities have included Torah and Talmud study, Hebrew instruction, Jewish philosophy, cultural programs and support for professional integration.

The Besht Yeshiva has described its model as a unique project that, in this particular form, did not previously exist elsewhere in the world.

The yeshiva is also described as the first newly founded yeshiva in eastern Germany after the Holocaust and as the world's first liberal-Hasidic yeshiva.

== Liberal Hasidic Judaism ==
Weingarten describes his religious approach as "liberal Hasidic". His approach combines elements of Hasidic spirituality, prayer, music, customs and traditional Jewish learning with liberal Jewish theology and communal practice.

He is known for wearing traditional Hasidic clothing, including a shtreimel and kaftan, on Shabbat while serving as a liberal rabbi. The Jüdische Kultusgemeinde Dresden describes him as the only liberal rabbi who currently wears Hasidic clothing of this kind on Shabbat.

In his sermons, Weingarten frequently uses Hasidic stories and interpretations of the Torah together with liberal and contemporary interpretations.

The Jewish Museum Berlin has described Weingarten's approach as an attempt to bring together the Hasidic world from which he came and the liberal Jewish world in which he now lives.

== Jewish community and educational work ==
A central focus of Weingarten's work has been supporting Jews who have left ultra-Orthodox communities. Beginning in 2017, he supported young Jewish people leaving ultra-Orthodox communities in integrating into wider society while maintaining a connection to Judaism.

His work in Dresden has included Jewish educational programs, youth activities, public lectures, cultural events, interfaith dialogue and initiatives aimed at strengthening Jewish life in the city.

The Jüdische Kultusgemeinde Dresden has developed a range of contacts with cultural institutions, educational organizations, Christian communities and other parts of Dresden's civil society.

== Die ewige Schrift – A Torah for Dresden ==
In August 2025, the Jüdische Kultusgemeinde Dresden launched "Die ewige Schrift – Eine Tora für Dresden", an 18-month public cultural and educational project to create a Torah scroll in Dresden.

The Torah is being written in a publicly accessible pavilion in front of the Stadtmuseum Dresden. The project combines the writing of the scroll with exhibitions, lectures, discussions and educational programs intended to make Jewish tradition and contemporary Jewish life visible to a wider public.

The writing process began in August 2025 and was continued from November 2025 by Liora Mendez, an aspiring female Torah scribe. The participation of both a male and female Torah scribe was presented by the organizers as a symbol of equality, diversity and the vitality of contemporary Jewish life in Dresden.

Weingarten described the project as a way of bringing a central part of Jewish religious tradition into the public sphere by having the Torah written openly in the center of Dresden.

== World Zionist Congress ==
In July 2025, Weingarten was elected as a representative of Germany to the World Zionist Congress.

== Bibliography ==
- Ultraorthodox: Mein Weg. Gütersloher Verlagshaus, Gütersloh 2022. ISBN 978-3-579-06218-1.

== Legal proceedings ==
In 2026, Weingarten faced legal proceedings in Dresden in connection with a case involving commercial fraud and money laundering. According to the prosecution, a company established in his name was used in an international technical-support scam involving 469 cases of commercial fraud and 44 cases of money laundering, with reported damages of approximately €148,000.

According to Weingarten's account, he established the company at the request of other people who wanted to start a business. He said that the company was not established for his own business activities, that he had no role in its operations and did not know what activities were subsequently conducted through it. He maintained that he had no knowledge of the fraudulent activities and did not personally profit from them. His defense also argued that he had no contact with the victims or influence over the payments they made.

On 22 May 2026, the Amtsgericht Dresden sentenced Weingarten to two years on probation, for fraud and money laundering, and ordered him to perform 150 hours of community service.

== See also ==
- Hasidic Judaism
- Liberal Judaism
- Jüdische Kultusgemeinde Dresden
- Besht Yeshiva Dresden
- World Zionist Congress
