= Besht Yeshiva Dresden =

Coordinates: 51°04′01″N 13°44′16″E

- ישיבת בעש״ט דרזדן
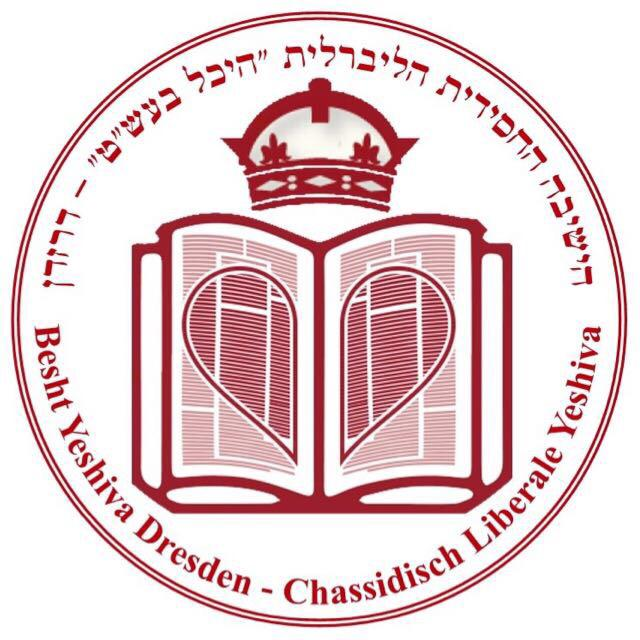
- Dresden; Germany

Information
- Type: Yeshiva
- Religious affiliation: liberal hasidic
- Established: 2020
- Founder: Rabbi Akiva Weingarten

The Besht Yeshiva Dresden is a Jewish educational institution in Dresden, Germany and the first founded Yeshiva in East Germany after the Shoah, as well as the first liberal-Hasidic yeshiva in the world. It was named after the founder of the Hasidic movement, Baal Shem Tov.

In April 2020 Rabbi Akiva Weingarten founded the Besht Yeshiva in Dresden with the aim of giving Jewish Off the derech's the opportunity to live their Jewishness in a liberal way and to pass on their deep traditional knowledge in the non-Orthodox Jewish communities. The Yeshiva is open to everyone and offers Talmud lessons and Hebrew courses. Another goal of the Yeshiva is to make Jewish life visible and natural again in Dresden. "Besht" is an acronym for the name of the founder of the Hasidic movement, Rabbi Israel Baal Shem Tov (1700–1760).

== Founding and goals ==
The yeshiva is led by Rabbi Akiva Weingarten and Rabbi Shlomo Tikochinski. Besht Dresden created networks within the city in the fields of education, health, technology, industry, culture and society to exchange knowledge and to network with citizens and institutions of Dresden. Within less than a year the Yeshiva's existence it has gained great interest by many news outlets in Europe and support from various political, educational and philanthropic institutions.

== Background ==
Rabbi Akiva Weingarten, an ex-Satmar Hasid from New York, uses his experience as a so-called "OTD" to help other OTD's to find their own way in Judaism for themselves. Besht Yeshiva Dresden is mainly active in Dresden, but should in the future expand worldwide. Besht Yeshiva Dresden cooperates with the Jewish community in Dresden, the liberal Jewish community "Migwan" in Basel and the TU Dresden.
