= Paul Rykens =

Dutch businessman and entrepreneur

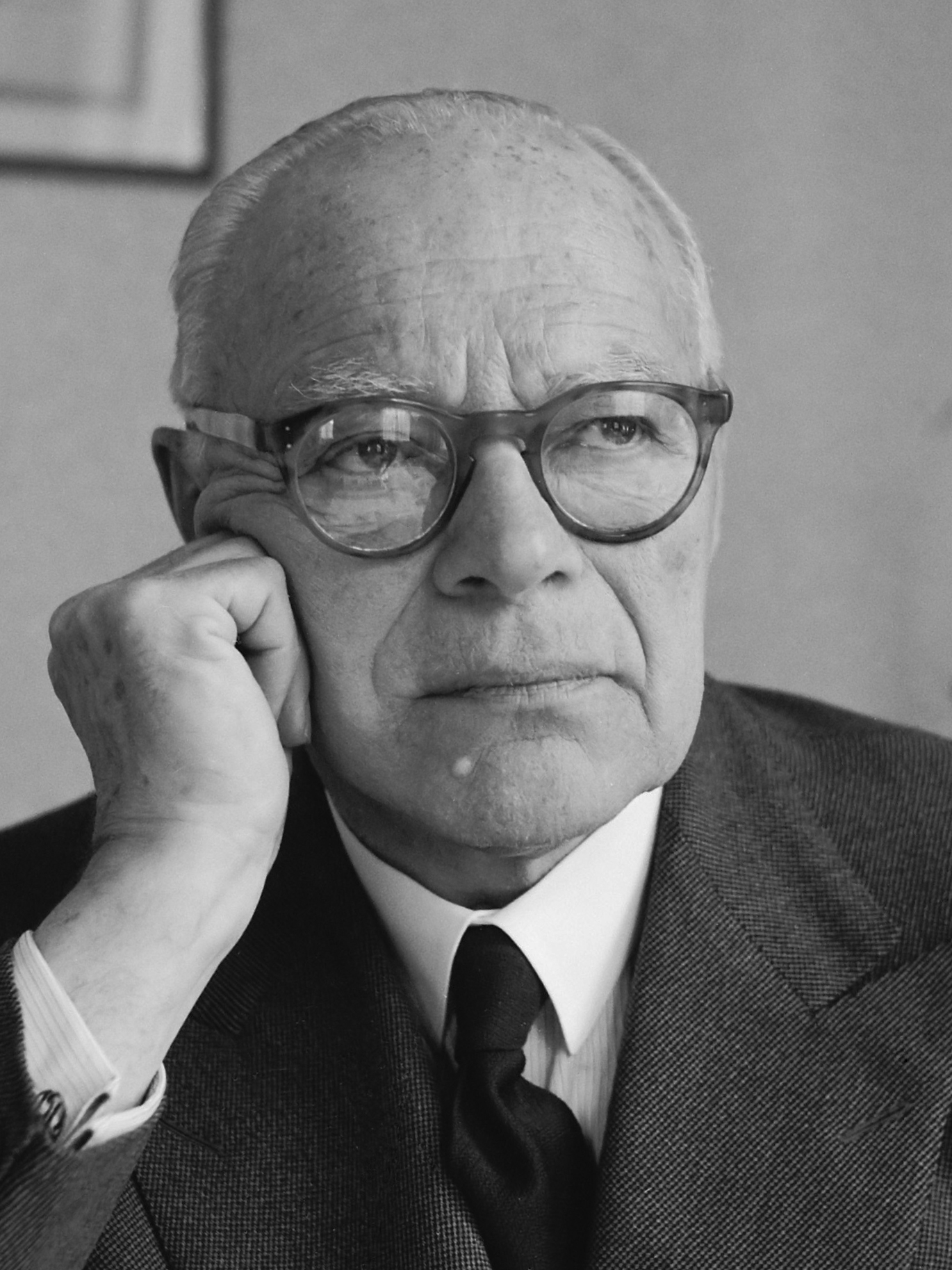
- Paul Rykens in 1961
- Born: 14 September 1888; Rotterdam, The Netherlands
- Died: 19 April 1965 (aged 76); Amsterdam, The Netherlands
- Occupation: Businessman
- Parent(s): Luppo Rijkens; Franziska Tenbult

Paul Rykens, also known as Paul Rijkens, (14 September 1888 - 19 April 1965) was a Dutch businessman. He served as the founding chairman of Unilever. He was a founding member of the Bilderberg Group.
