= Rik Vercoe =

British runner (born 1970/71)

Personal information
- Nationality: British
- Born: 1970 or 1971 (age 55–56)
- Home town: Walton on Thames, England

Sport
- Club: 100 Marathon Club

Achievements and titles
- Personal bests: Marathon: 2:54:22 (2013); 10 marathons in 10 days: 29:54:56 (2013, WR)
Medal record
Marathon
Representing United Kingdom
North Pole Marathon
Silver medal – second place	2010 North Pole	Marathon
- Updated on 13 March 2015

Rik Vercoe (born 1970 or 1971) is a British ultramarathon runner from Walton on Thames, Surrey, England. In 2013 he set the British record for most marathons completed in 365 days, having run 152 races at marathon distance and above.

While setting the British record for most marathons in a year, Vercoe won both the Brathay and Irish 10 marathons in 10 days races. He was also one of the first two people to complete the Ultra Running Relentless race, which involves running an average of 30 miles a day for 30 days through all of the 47 counties in England. At the end of 2013, while running 16 marathons in Long Beach, California, Vercoe picked up the world record for the fastest aggregate time for 10 marathons in 10 days.

Aged 43, he also set a new world record at the 2014 London Marathon for the fastest marathon dressed as a cowboy in a time of 3:09:09. He took 32 minutes off the previous record. However, he was beaten by 39 seconds by the 'fastest jockey'. After completing the race he said:

I have to say that running dressed in blue jeans and leather chaps was not the best of ideas on one of the hottest days of the year so far. Needless to say I will indeed be walking like a cowboy for at least a week.

Previously, Vercoe competed in the 2010 North Pole Marathon, representing Great Britain and finishing in second place in a time of 5:07:30 behind Joep Rozendal of the Netherlands. In April 2013, he ran the Marathon des Sables, often billed as the toughest race on earth, finishing in 39th place out of 1,024 runners, then a few days later ran the London Marathon in his desert attire to raise more funds for his chosen charity, the Brathay Trust.

Aside from running, Vercoe is an avid scuba diver. By 2010, he had made over 1400 dives in 30 locations worldwide. He has written a number of guide books on diving:

- Vercoe, Rik (2008). Hurghada: Diving Guide. Travelling Diver.
- Vercoe, Rik (2008). Sharm el Sheikh: Diving Guide. Travelling Diver.
- Vercoe, Rik (2007). Red Sea Wrecks - Northern Egypt: Site-by-site Dive Guide.
- Vercoe, Rik (2012). Northern Wrecks and Reefs Liveaboard: Diving Guide. Travelling Diver.
- Vercoe, Rik (2008). Safaga: Site-by-site Dive Guide. Travelling Diver.
- Vercoe, Rik (2012). El-Gouna: Diving Guide. Travelling Diver.
