= Scaglia =

Scaglia (pronounced [ˈskaʎʎa]) is a surname from Northwest Italy, possibly derived from a nickname for 'armour'. Notable people with the name include:

- Cesare Alessandro Scaglia (1592–1641), Italian Catholic cleric, diplomat, and abbot
- Desiderio Scaglia (1567–1639), Italian Catholic cardinal, bishop of Como
- Diego Scaglia (born 1967), Argentine-Italian rugby player and coach
- Filippo Scaglia (born 1992), Italian football player
- Franco Scaglia (1944–2015), Italian writer and journalist
- Galileo Juan Scaglia (1915–1989), Argentine naturalist
  - Scaglia (mammal), an extinct mammal genus named after him
  - Scaglia's tuco-tuco, a species of rodent named after him
- Girolamo Scaglia (1620–1686), Italian painter
- Gisela Scaglia (born 1976), Argentine politician
- Luigi Scaglia (born 1986), Italian football player
- Lucas Scaglia (born 1987), Argentine football player and coach
- Massimiliano Scaglia (born 1977), Italian football player
- Michelle-Marie Heinemann Scaglia (born 1966), American businesswoman and socialite
- Patrick Scaglia, American businessman
- Phillip Scaglia, American politician from Missouri
- Renata Scaglia (born 1954), Italian discus thrower
- Silvio Scaglia (born 1958), Swiss-born Italian entrepreneur

== See also ==
- Scaglione
- Scagliotti
- Scoglio
