= Babelgum =

Free-to-view Internet television platform

- Developer: Babel Networks
- Release: Beta (March 7, 2007)
- Operating system: Windows (XP or Vista) or Mac OS X (10.4 or higher) or iPhone OS, Android or Symbian Series 60 devices
- Type: Mobile and web entertainment
- Website: www.babelgum.com

Babelgum was a free-to-view Internet television platform supported by advertising. The project was set up in 2005 by Italian media and telecommunications entrepreneur Silvio Scaglia (one of the founders of Italian TelCo Fastweb) and scientist Erik Lumer, with the aim of developing interactive software for distributing TV shows and other forms of video over the Internet.

Babelgum uses streaming TV technology to provide free, on-demand TV content to end users. The company aims to combine the “immersive viewing experience” and visual quality of traditional television with the features made possible by the internet. The beta version of the service was presented on 7 March 2007.

On September 1, 2007, Babelgum launched the Babelgum Online Film Festival, the first global online film festival dedicated to independent film. Viewers voted for the shortlists while a professional jury, chaired by Spike Lee, selected the winners.

In October 2008, the company launched the Babelgum Music Video Awards, another online competition with audience voting, focusing solely on music videos from unsigned artists. The contest was run in partnership with Music Nation, and the jury included French director Michel Gondry.

In December 2008, the company launched Babelgum Mobile, a new mobile application bringing "web-tailored video content" to smartphones such as the iPhone via 3G and Wi-Fi.

In September 2009, the company launched the Babelgum Metropolis Art Prize, an online prize for the best Art videos. The winning videos were shown on jumbo monitors in Times Square, NY on Dec 17th, 2009. The jury was chaired by actor/artist Isabella Rossellini and included Howard Halle, art critic at Time Out NY, Cedar Lewisohn, curator at the Tate Britain and Lee Wells from PAM and Scope Art Fair.

In November 2009, it was reported that Babelgum was downsizing by closing its Nice office and Dublin HQ, and consolidating its operations across the remaining offices in London, New York and Milan.

== Name ==
According to the company's website, Babelgum's goal is "to act as an international 'social glue'", bringing a vast range of content to a global audience of different nationalities, like a "modern-day Tower of Babel". The company's green bubble-shaped logo is therefore a visual pun on the name as well as a reference to Babelgum's interest in ecological issues.

== Content ==
Babelgum only airs professionally produced content, focusing on indie film and music, comedy, urban culture, nature and the environment, presented through the five channels Film, Music, Comedy, Metropolis and Our Earth. In addition to mainstream TV content, Babelgum offers niche programming such as independent and short films, aiming to "serve the Long Tail of viewers' interests". The platform also features branded channels set up through licensing agreements with content providers such as Associated Press, BBC, PBS, 3DD, Shine Limited, IMG, EMI, Sony BMG, Funny or Die, Off The Fence, National Geographic, and Lonely Planet. Babelgum also has partnerships with international film festivals such as the Seattle International Film Festival, DC Independent, Encounters and Rushes Soho Shorts.

Users can rate the programmes they watch and log their favorites in the system. Content owners can upload single videos or entire content libraries through the Babelgum Video Publisher.

=== Social aspect ===
Users can embed and rate videos, post links on Facebook, MySpace, Digg and other social news websites, and create playlists of favourite clips if logged in.

== Babelgum Mobile ==
Babelgum Mobile is the company's mobile video application for smartphones (iPhone, Google Android, and some Nokia models). It operates via 3G and Wi-Fi networks and aims to offer "web-tailored programming" for smartphones, i.e. content edited into formats suitable for mobile viewing. Babelgum's CEO claims this makes it the “first independent online television company to cross over into full mobile internet”.

== Technology ==
Babelgum had originally developed its own proprietary technology based on secure peer-to-peer streaming, along with a system for video compression using H.264 codec, and a video player to show the content. In March 2009, the company abandoned P2P in favour of Flash technology, so the videos now play directly within the browser window. Minimum requirements are Adobe Flash 9.0.115 or higher and bandwidth of at least 450 kbit/s.

== Financing and business model ==
Babelgum is an independent, privately held company that is wholly owned and funded by Silvio Scaglia. The company has so far invested 50 million euros (of Scaglia's personal fortune) and is expected to invest between 35 and 60 million euros per annum in the period 2008–2010.

== See also ==
- Internet television
- IPTV
- P2PTV
