= Scoglio =

Scoglio (pronounced [ˈskɔʎʎo]) is an Italian surname from eastern Sicily, meaning 'reef rock' or 'low sea stack' or denoting origin from Scoglitti. Notable people with the surname include:

- Agatina Carmen Maria Scoglio (1935–2022), known as Tina Scala, Italian-American actress and model, sister of Gia
- Caterina Scoglio, Italian network scientist and computer engineer
- Franco Scoglio (1941–2005), Italian football manager
- Josephine Grace Johanna Scoglio (1934–1972), known as Gia Scala, Italian-British-American actress, sister of Tina

== See also ==
- Scaglia
