= Bob Geary =

Bob Geary may refer to:

- Bob Geary (Canadian football) (1933–2001), player and general manager of the Montreal Alouettes
- Bob Geary (baseball) (1891–1980), American Major League Baseball pitcher
- Bob Geary (police officer) (1939–2025), officer in the San Francisco Police Department

== See also ==
- Robert Geary (disambiguation)
