= Kreatel =

Swedish technology company

Kreatel Communications AB was a Swedish technology company, based in Linköping, that provided set-top boxes and software platforms for IPTV systems. It launched its IP-based set-top box (IP-STB) system in September 2000 and first delivered it in volume to Italian broadband operator Fastweb in Spring 2001. In early 2006, the company was purchased by Motorola.

Kreatel is a business-to-business company, and sells its products to telecom operators, broadband operators (ISPs) and utility companies (with fiber networks) which deploy IPTV and Triple Play (voice telephony, video and Internet access) services to consumers.

The most common services that the Kreatel IP-STB System is used for are Video on Demand - VOD, Internet on TV, Electronic Program Guide - EPG, games, and video telephony, but it also enables a connection between a PC and the TV set to access personal content from the set-top box.

The company was founded in 1996 as a provider of Least Cost Telephony Routers, but during the early 2000s switched its business over to digital TV.
