= Alex Shapiro =

American composer

Alex Shapiro (born January 11, 1962, in New York City, NY) is an American composer and creator advocate. Her acoustic and electroacoustic music concert works are characterized by their genre eclecticism incorporating influences including minimalism, 12-tone serialism, pop, jazz, electronic dance music, and cinematically inspired sound worlds.

== Education ==
Alex Shapiro was born in Manhattan and raised in its Yorkville neighborhood. Her early education began at the 92nd Street Y, followed by two years of elementary school at P.S. 158, and then entering The Ethical Culture Fieldston School, from which she graduated high school in 1980.

Shapiro began composing at age 9 and in 1977 at age 15 began formal composition lessons when she enrolled in Mannes College of Music summer classes, studying electronic music with David Tcimpidis and composition with Leo Edwards. She was a composition student of Michael Czajkowski and studied ear training with George Tsontakis at the Aspen Music School and Festival in 1978 and 1979, and was accepted as a composition major at the Pre-College Division of The Juilliard School in 1979 where she was a student of Craig Shuler and Bruce Adolphe, graduating in 1980.

In the fall of 1980 Shapiro enrolled in Manhattan School of Music where her primary composition teacher was Ursula Mamlok. There she also studied composition with John Corigliano, electronic music with Elias Tanenbaum, and theory with Ludmila Ulehla. In 1983, upon being hired to score a documentary film in Los Angeles, Shapiro opted to leave Manhattan School of Music before graduating, having completed her third year of undergraduate studies. Shapiro was a member of the Manhattan School of Music Alumni Council from 1998 to 2016.

In the summer of 1983 Shapiro moved from New York City to Los Angeles where she lived for 24 years, first in the San Fernando Valley until 1993 and then in Malibu until 2007.

Shapiro has lived on Washington State's San Juan Island since 2007.

== Musical career ==
Shapiro began her career composing for commercial media, and in the late 1990s made the decision to shift her focus away from writing commercial music to devote her time to composing for the concert stage. Her music catalog includes over 200 scores for large ensembles, choir, chamber ensembles, and soloists, as well as jazz charts, film cues, and pop songs. She has composed nearly 30 works for concert wind band, the majority of which are electroacoustic, and is known for her contemporary approach to the genre's repertoire at all performance skill levels, through pieces that often incorporate visual and physical multimedia, as well as extended instrumental techniques.

Her works often incorporate unusual instruments such as printer paper, metal bowls of water dripped from sponges, rocks, ping pong balls, and balloons in pieces like “Paper Cut” (2010), “Liquid Compass” (2014), “Rock Music” (2016), “Masked” (2021) and “Pop Music” (2022), and make extensive use of recorded found sounds and sound design in works including “Beneath” (2010), “Trains of Thought” (2017), “Ascent” (2020), “Breathe” (2020), and “Viral” (2021). Shapiro is widely regarded as a pioneer in bringing technology into the wind band genre, both through her music and as an early adopter in engaging with ensembles in hundreds of online sessions for which she coined the term, “webhearsals”. Her music in the field has been the subject of more than thirty dissertations. Conductor Aaron Noe writes, "Composer Alex Shapiro's music is cutting edge. She is a master at blending live performance and electronic performance. To say the least, she is not intimidated by new technological advancement; in fact, she embraces it and shapes it into a beautiful or energetic masterpiece.

Shapiro did not begin composing for wind band until she received an unexpected commission in 2007 from the U.S. Army TRADOC Band, resulting in "Homecoming". During the prior decade, her concert music catalog was comprised mainly works for acoustic chamber ensembles, as well as several electroacoustic works for soloists and duets. In his 2008 composer profile article on Alex Shapiro for Chamber Music America magazine, journalist and composer Kyle Gann wrote, "Shapiro has tech skills and style information that most classical composers can only wonder at...Trained for infinite versatility, she can write any kind of music she wants, and she writes only what she wants... Shapiro has a deep connection to nature, and an engaging and articulate personality that has gotten her multifariously involved in the new-classical-music world. She gets more performances than any one person could attend, and despite her nature wonderland she's socially inclined."

Among the 40 commercially released albums that include Shapiro's music are two devoted solely to her works: a compilation of her chamber music titled Notes From the Kelp (2007) and a recording of her solo piano works recorded by Adam Marks for the album Arcana (2020), both on Innova Recordings.

Calling on Shapiro's previous work in commercial media, in 2015 Clemson University commissioned her to create the music for the Clemson Tiger Band entrance video, projected as the marching band enters Memorial Stadium for their halftime performances. The music continues to be used in 2025.

== Advocacy ==
Since 2014 Shapiro has been the Symphony and Concert Representative on the ASCAP Board of Directors, and is the first woman elected to that seat since the organization's founding in 1914. In 2015 she was elected to the board of The ASCAP Foundation and in 2022 became one of its four officers. From 2016 to 2019 Shapiro was ASCAP's elected representative on the executive committee of CIAM, the writer's council to CISAC, the global network of collective management companies. In 2009 Shapiro joined the ASCAP Symphony & Concert Committee, which she now co-chairs with classical music publisher ASCAP board member counterpart James Kendrick. Shapiro was elected as the concert music composer representative on the ASCAP Board of Review in 2010 and served until her 2014 election to the ASCAP Board of Directors.

Shapiro was on the Board of Directors of the American Music Center from 2009 until 2011 when the organization shifted to become New Music USA, for which Shapiro was Chairperson of its Program Council from 2014 to 2017 and a frequent essayist to its online magazine NewMusicBox.

In 2021 Shapiro was initiated as an Honorary Brother of both Kappa Kappa Psi and Tau Beta Sigma, and is the recipient of the 2021 Tau Beta Sigma's Outstanding Service to Music Award.

== Film appearances ==
Shapiro appears in three of Michael Stillwater's films: Shining Night, In Search of the Great Song, which also includes some of her music, and Beyond the Fear of Singing.

== Additional interests ==
Shapiro's web presences are infused with her wildlife and landscape photography. Her photography was featured in the 2013 Spirit of Flight exhibit at Seattle's Museum of Flight, and was also on display at the San Juan Islands Museum of Art after being awarded a prize in the Ernest H. Brooks II ‘Above and Beneath the Sea’ photo competition.

From 1983 to 1994, Shapiro was an avid amateur herpetologist and an active member of the Los Angeles chapter of The Southwestern Herpetologists Society. She cared for 40 different species of snakes, frogs and lizards, and bred Burmese pythons.

== Selected discography ==
- From a Deep Blue Sky, work included: Train of Thought. Tonsehen Records, 2023.
- Suspended, work included: Suspended. Mark Custom Records, 2022
- Arcana, works included: Spark; Slowly, Searching; Arcana; Piano Suite No. 1, The Resonance of Childhood; Intermezzo; Chord History; Luvina; Sonata for Piano. Innova Recordings, 2020.
- Double or Nothing, work included: Deep. Mark Custom Records, 2018.
- Everything Beautiful, works included: Liquid Compass; Tight Squeeze. Mark Custom Records, 2016.
- 250 Piano Pieces for Beethoven, work included: Chord History. Obst Records, 2016.
- Atmospheres, work included: Water Crossing. Taukay Edizioni Musicali, 2015.
- Excelsior, work included: Perpetual Spark. Cedille Records, 2013.
- The Dreams Of Birds, work included: Intermezzo. Delos Records, 2012.
- An Robert Schumann, work included: Slowly, searching. Obst Records, 2010.
- Delicate Balance, work included: Water Crossing. Aucourant Records, 2010.
- Below: Music for Low Flutes, work included: Below. Move Records, 2009.
- Notes From The Kelp, works included: Slipping; Bioplasm; Current Events; For My Father; At the Abyss; Phos Hilaron; Music for Two Big Instruments; Deep. Innova Recordings, 2007.
- Solo Rumores, work Included: Luvina. Quindecim Recordings, 2007.
- Saxtronic Soundscape, work included: Desert Tide. Centaur Records, 2007.
- Trumpet Colors, work included: Elegy. Crystal Records, 2007.
- Californian Concert: Music of European Immigrants and Their American Contemporaries, work included: For My Father. Oehms Classics, 2006.
- Music for Hammers and Sticks, work included: At the Abyss. Innova Recordings, 2005.
- Coast to Coast, work included: Music for Two Big Instruments. Baer Tracks Records, 2005.
- Beck and Call, works included: Of Breath and Touch; Deep. Crystal Records, 2005.
- New American Piano Music, work included: Sonata for Piano. Innova Recordings, 2001.
- Clariphonia - Music Of The 20th Century On Clarinet, work included: Trio For Violin, Clarinet And Piano. Cambria Records, 2000.

== Dissertations about Shapiro's music ==
- Etnoyer, Elizabeth Mary (2015). The Keyboard Works of Alex Shapiro (Thesis). doi:10.33915/etd.5556.
