= Silence & Darkness =

- Release poster
- Directed by: Barak Barkan
- Written by: Barak Barkan
- Produced by: Pablo Burn; Barak Barkan
- Starring: Mina Walker; Joan Glackin; Jordan Lage
- Cinematography: Omar Nasr
- Edited by: Colton Fordyce
- Production company: Lyntone Productions
- Distributed by: Alarm Pictures
- Release dates: March 3, 2019 (DC Independent Film Festival); November 23, 2020 (VOD)
- Running time: 81 minutes
- Country: United States
- Language: English

Silence & Darkness, also known under the title Touched, is a 2019 American thriller film written and directed by Barak Barkan in his directorial debut. It stars Mina Walker, Joan Glackin and Jordan Lage. The film was produced by Lyntone Productions.

== Synopsis ==
Anna and Beth are siblings. Anna is blind and Beth is deaf. They provide much of each other's company and support. Each assists the other with tasks that would need hearing or sight to complete and the sisters appear to be almost completely dependent on each other, staying together most all of the time. They live in a small town with their germaphobic, widower Father, a physician who is having an affair with a married woman, Mrs. Long.

On the surface they appear to be a normal family and neither sibling questions any of Father's actions, despite him drugging them at night and bathing them in the morning before feeding them breakfast. He also keeps a narrated journal in which he describes his daughters as if they were experiments. It isn't until a neighbor, Mrs. Bishop, discovers a human bone in the forest that Anna begins to question Father's actions, in specific asking about the death of their mother. Attempts to discover what Mrs. Bishop discovered in the woods are repeatedly unsuccessful.

Anna teaches Beth how to play the guitar for a local talent show, which seems to make Father unhappy. He gives Beth a medicine that appears to makes her sick and takes her to the hospital. This sets Anna on edge, particularly as she isn't allowed to accompany them, and she experiences a breakdown while they are away. Beth returns with one of her arms removed and a new withdrawn and angry personality. When Beth refuses to take medicine offered by Father, he tries to have Anna secretly slip it into her food. Rather than secretly drug her sister, Anna throws them into a nearby stream. Later that night Anna and Beth murder their father, after which they huddle together on the floor.

Meanwhile, Mrs. Long enters Father's office in town, discovering his audio journals in the process. She's horrified to learn that he had deliberately caused the sisters' blindness and deafness. Mrs. Long also listens to his description of Beth's amputation, which was unnecessary, and his irritation at their reliance on each other rather than himself. On the drive to the family home, Mrs. Long and the town sheriff listen to the recordings. As they pull up to the house, unaware of Father's murder, the sisters flee undetected.

== Cast ==
- Mina Walker as Anna
- Joan Glackin as Beth
- Jordan Lage as Father/Doctor
- Sandra Gartner as Mrs. Bishop
- Ariel Zevon as Mrs. Long

== Release ==
Silence & Darkness premiered on March 3, 2019, at the DC Independent Film Festival, where it screened under the title Touched. It received a digital and on-demand release the following year via Alarm Pictures on November 23, 2020.

== Reception ==
Critical reception has been positive. Rue Morgue praised Silence & Darkness for its acting and tension, which they felt was well developed. High on Films and Battle Royale With Cheese held similar opinions, with the former stating that it was "an earnest, rigorous film – one that you must visit with all your senses, unaware."

=== Awards ===
- Best Feature at the DC Independent Film Festival (2019, won)
