= Robert Geary =

Robert Geary may refer to:

- Roy C. Geary (1896–1983), statistician
- Robert Geary (wrestling promoter), see List of professional wrestling promoters
- Robert Geary, conductor of Shining Night: A Portrait of Composer Morten Lauridsen

== See also ==
- Bob Geary (disambiguation)
- Robert Garioch (pronounced Geary)
