= Surplex =

Surplex GmbH
- Industry: Used machinery trade
- Founded: 1999
- Headquarters: Düsseldorf, Germany
- Area served: International
- Key people: Michael Werker, Ulrich Stalter
- Website: www.surplex.com

Düsseldorf-based Surplex GmbH is an industrial auction house specializing in trading in second-hand machinery. The company is not associated with Surplex Recovery & Recycling in the U.S. The company buys and sells used machinery and industrial equipment worldwide, carries out online auctions and offers appraisals and valuations.

== History ==
=== Foundation ===
Surplex.com AG was founded by the brothers Bruno and Florian Schick at the end of 1999 as a start-up company of the Dotcom-era. International venture capital consortia such as the Carlyle Group or the French Vivendi Group awarded a total of around EUR 50 million. Prominent private investors, such as Lars Schlecker, Lars Windhorst, Marc Schrempp or Fiat president Paolo Fresco also invested in Surplex.

Surplex's B2B platform was named the best platform by Forrester Research in 2001.

=== Crisis (2001–2003) ===
With the bursting of the Dot-com bubble, Surplex.com AG also fell into a severe crisis. Branches were closed, the company headquarters were moved back from Berlin to Düsseldorf and most of the 140 jobs were cut. In March 2003, the management was taken over by Michael Werker, who had come to Surplex from the traditional mechanical engineering group Deutz.

=== Consolidation (2004–2009) ===
Between 2004 and 2009, the auction platform surplex.com was steadily developed. Since then Surplex has conducted large industrial auctions, e.g. for Linde, ABB, ThyssenKrupp and Bayer.

=== Internationalisation (since 2010) ===
Today, Surplex has offices in 13 European countries (as of November 2020), including Spain, France and the UK. In 2020, the auction platform became the centre of business in 16 languages. Every year, more than 55,000 industrial assets are auctioned off in over 500 auctions. These assets usually originate from company closures, restructurings or insolvencies.

Since summer 2020, Ghislaine Duijmelings has been leading the company as its third managing director, alongside Michael Werker and Ulrich Stalter. In August 2024, Surplex was acquired by TBAuctions, a European multi-brand group (Troostwijk Auctions, Klaravik, Surplex, Auksjonen, PS Auctions, British Medical Auctions, Vavato and Auktionshuset dab) and digital B2B auction platform.

== Products/Services ==
The company's industrial goods usually come from plant closures, restructurings or insolvencies. Surplex offers direct sales as well as all offline services needed to trade used machinery globally. These include dismantling, loading and customs clearance. Under the brand name Valuplex, Surplex provides appraisals and valuations.
