= Scaglione =

Scaglione may refer to:

- Anna Scaglione, Italian and American electrical engineer
- Antonio Scaglione, 16th-century Italian architect
- Franco Scaglione, Italian automotive designer
- Josefina Scaglione, Argentinian musical theatre actress
- Julie Scaglione, Danish handball player
- Massimo Scaglione (1931–2015), Italian television director, writer and politician
- Pietro Scaglione, Chief Prosecutor of Palermo, Sicily; murdered by Mafia, 1971
- Tony Scaglione, drummer for thrash metal/speed metal band Whiplash

== See also ==
- Scaglia
- Scagliotti
