= Steinunn Sigurðardóttir (designer) =

Icelandic fashion designer

- Born: Reykjavík, Iceland
- Education: Fashion design
- Alma mater: Parsons School of Design
- Known for: Fashion design, knitwear, installation
- Notable work: STEiNUNN, Rhythm Knitting, Spaces in-between
- Spouse: Páll Hjaltason

Steinunn Sigurðardóttir is an Icelandic fashion designer. She is the founder and creative director of the label STEiNUNN, founded in 2000.

== Early life ==
Steinunn was born in Reykjavík, Iceland.

In a 2006 interview at Sjónþingi Gerðubergs, Steinunn talks about the influence her mother and grandmother had on her early life and how it shaped her professional career. Steinunn's grandmother worked as a seamstress and frequently made clothes for Steinunn. She taught Steinunn how to knit at the age of 9 but knitwear design has been very predominant in Steinunn's collections. Steinunn also credits her mother's great sense of style. She recalls a particular dress her mother used to wear which Steinunn eventually inherited. The dress became an iconic part of Steinunn's wardrobe and later in her career inspired a design for a Calvin Klein dress, which walked the runway in 1992.

After finishing her studies in Reykjavík, Steinunn moved to New York City to attend Parsons School of Design. Steinunn was the first Icelandic person to attend Parsons School of Design.

When she arrived in New York she recalls having to grow up very fast in such a fast-paced city. Her knitting skills came of good use; within a month and a half she had gotten a job as a pattern sample knitter which allowed her to earn extra money to cover the expense of living in New York City.

Despite having been told she would never get into a design school by her teachers back home in Iceland, Steinunn graduated in 1986 from Parsons with a Bachelor in Fashion Design (BFA), with honours.

== Career ==
Upon her graduation in 1986, Steinunn spent a brief year working with Carmelo Pomodoro as an assistant designer. The two had met during her studies at Parsons. In 1987 to 1989 she worked as a designer for Polo/Ralph Lauren Collection.

In 1989 she got the opportunity to design for Calvin Klein. The two began a close relationship and Steinunn quickly moved on to become the Director and Senior Knitwear Designer for Calvin Klein Inc., Collection, CK Sport, and Jeans Division. At Calvin Klein she continued experimenting with knitwear. Her signature design became cable knit, which gave her the nickname "The Cable Queen" at the Calving Klein house. Later on during her work at Calvin Klein she began experimenting with knit as fabric. She manipulated the material and discovered new techniques to create a different feel and texture.

Steinunn reported that in a single year she designed twelve clothing lines, worked on six fashion shows, and traveled internationally, including trips to Hong Kong, San Francisco, Italy, and Iceland. She later described this period as providing insight into the demands of the fashion industry.

Steinunn left Calvin Klein Inc. in 1995 and began working as the Director and Senior Designer for Gucci Group. She was with Gucci Group until the year 2000.

In 2000, Steinunn became the Creative Director of La Perla Ready to Wear. Steinunn sought a lot of her inspiration from her native country Iceland, and its nature. She began experimenting with sheer fabrics and silk to bring out texture that reminded her of freshly fallen snow. Steinunn also started playing with fish skin in her designs which at the time was unheard of. Steinunn was the main advocate for starting a swimsuit line for La Perla. She recalls having to fight for her vision, but once she got what she wanted La Perla gained a lot of attention for its swimwear.

== STEiNUNN ==
The same year that she started her work as Creative Director at La Perla, Steinunn withdrew $10,000 from her savings account and started her own fashion label STEiNUNN back in Iceland. She left her position at La Perla in 2003 to focus solely on her own brand and other personal projects. After a successful and challenging career abroad, Steinunn felt it the biggest challenge yet was to become an independent designer and create something that purely reflects her personal vision. In an interview she said the goal as a designer is to constantly push her creative practice further and bring it to the next level.

In November 2011 Steinunn relocated her store to 17 Grandagardur, located in the fish-packing district of Reykjavík. Steinunn re-designed a building which used to be a small repair workshop for fishnets, but kept the authentic rustic charm. The original floors, left untouched, tell the story of the space.

== Awards and honours ==
Steinunn received the prestigious Söderberg Prize from the Rhösska museum in 2008

Other awards and honours:

- 2011 "Indriði Award" Icelandic Fashion Council, first time recipient
- 2009 Reykjavík City Artist 2009, Reykjavík City, Iceland, first time designer recipient
- 2008 Söderberg Prize, Winner of the Torsten and Wanja Söderberg Prize, Gothenburg, Sweden, first time fashion design recipient
- 2008 Myndstef Award, Nomination, Reykjavík, Iceland
- 2008 FKA – The Icelandic Association of Women Entrepreneurs Award, Reykjavík, Iceland
- 2007 Winner of "Ginen 2007", Nordic fashion awards.
- 2007 Awarded by the President of Iceland the "Knight´s Cross" of "The Order of the Falcon" first time designer recipient
- 2006 Icelandic Visual Art Award, Nomination
- 2006 Saga Fur Workshop, Copenhagen
- 2003 "Designer of the Year" award in Iceland, "Menningarverðlaun"
- 2000 Finalist in Enkamania Design Talent
- 1986 Adri Gold Thimble Award
- 1986 Norman Norell Scholarship
- 1985 Norman Norell Scholarship
- 1985 Carmelo Pomodoro Silver Thimble Award
- 1985 Designer of the Future, Knitted Textiles Association

== Exhibitions ==
Steinunn has held numerous lectures, set on solo and group exhibitions as well as curated exhibitions in Iceland and abroad. She has served on boards of numerous companies and organisations, and frequently teaches as a guest teacher in design schools around the world.

Her works have been acquired by museums in Iceland, Sweden, and Norway.

In 2013 Steinunn introduced Rhythm Knitting as a part of the Nordic Cool 2013 festival organised by the Kennedy Center. "Steinunn Sigurd presented a hands-on workshop celebrating the cultural and artistic value of knitting. From novice to expert, participants of all skill levels were introduced to new possibilities in knitting, using music and creative techniques without needles that found the participants using only their fingers."

=== Selected exhibitions ===
Selected solo exhibitions

- 2016 Rhythm Knitting light Installation, Harpa Music Hall, Reykjavík, Iceland
- 2014 Rhythm Knitting light Installation, L8ight Festival, Aberdeen, Scotland
- 2011 "Upbeat" Gallery 751D Beijing, China
- 2010 "Nordic Light House, World Expo, Shanghai, China
- 2009 "Steinunn" Kjarvalstaðir, Reykjavík Art Museum, Iceland
- 2008 "STEiNUNN" Rhösska Design Museum, Söderberg, Gothenburg
- 2006 "Fortíð – Nútíð" Textil Museum, Blöndós, Iceland
- 2006 "Retrospective", Nordatlantesbrygge Copenhagen
- 2006 "Sjónþing - a retrospective", Gallery Gerðuberg, Reykjavík

Selected group exhibitions

- 2016 "Weather Diaries" Nordic Fashion Biennale Royal, Nordic House, Rvk, Iceland
- 2015 "Weather Diaries" Nordic Fashion Biennale Royal, Coda Museum Holland
- 2015 "Weather Diaries" Nordic Fashion Biennale Royal, Nordic House, Faroe Islands
- 2014 "Weather Diaries" Nordic Fashion Biennale Royal Library, Copenhagen, Denmark
- 2014 "Weather Diaries" Nordic Fashion Biennale Royal, Frankfurt Design Museum
- 2013 "Nordic Design" Design Museum Iceland.
- 2013 "Nordic Cool" Kennedy Art Center for Performing Arts, Washington D.C., USA
- 2012 "Nordic Design" Vandalorum Design Museum, Sweden
- 2011 "Looking Back", Nordic Fashion Biennale, Nordic Museum, Seattle
- 2011 "On the Cutting Edge" Museum for Applied Art, Frankfurt
- 2010 "STEiNUNN" Upbeat, Gallery 751D Beijing, China
- 2010 "STEiNUNN" Nordic Light House, World Expo, Shanghai
- 2009 "Code" Belle Center Copenhagen, Denmark
- 2009 "Nordic Fashion Biennale" Nordic House, Reykjavík, Iceland
- 2007 "Iceland Cometh", Meatpacking District, ICFF, Gallery, New York
- 2007 "Icelandic Fashion & Design", Nordic Embassies, Berlin
- 2006 "Icelandic Fashion", National Centre for Cultural Heritage, Reykjavík
- 2006 "Mode and Design Aus Islande" National Centre for Cultural Heritage, RVK
- 2006 "Retrospective", Nordatlantesbrygge Copenhagen
- 2006 "Sjónþing - a retrospective", Gallery Gerðuberg, Reykjavík
- 2006 "Fashion & Design", The Museum of Applied Art, Cologne
- 2005 "Icelandic culture", Stockholm's Auktionsverk
- 2005 "World Expo 2005" World Fair Tokyo, Japan
- 2004 "Nordic cool", National Museum of Women in the Arts, Washington, USA
- 2002 Museum of Modern Art, Barcelona
- 2002 "5 X 5 Nordic Design", Stockholm Design show

Curator

- 2013 "Silver" National Museum of Iceland w/Páll Hjaltason
- 2012 "Fingramál", Icelandic Design Museum
- 2012 "Tízka" / "Fashion", National Museum of Iceland
- 2010 "World Expo 2010 " Iceland Pavilion Shanghai, curated w/Páll Hjaltason, Finnbogi Péturs, Ámundi Sigurðs, Saga Film
- 2005 "Ómur, National Museum of Iceland, curated w/Páll Hjaltason
- 2004 "Transforme", Gallery Marel, Reykjavík, curated w/Páll Hjaltason
- 2004 "Transforme" VIA Gallery, Paris, curated w/Páll Hjaltason

== Works in public collections ==
- 2009 Hönnunarsafn Íslands, Design Museum of Iceland.
- 2009 Rhösska Design Museum, Söderberg Priz, Gothenburg
- 2009 Museum of Decorative Arts and Design, Oslo, Norway

== Lectures ==
- 2016 "Rhythm Knitting" Nordic House, Reykjavík, Iceland
- 2014 "Rhythm Knitting" Aberdeen, Scotland
- 2014 "Rhythm Knitting" Royal Library Copenhagen, Denmark
- 2014 "Rhythm Knitting" Boras School of Textiles, Sweden
- 2014 STEiNUNN, Boras School of Textiles, Sweden
- 2014 "Rhythm Knitting" Nordic House, Faroe Islands
- 2014 "Rhythm Knitting" Frankfurt Design Museum, Germany
- 2014 Women in Parliament, Harpa Music Hall, Reykjavík, Iceland
- 2014 STEiNUNN, Alaska Art Museum, Anchorage, Alaska
- 2014 "Rhythm Knitting" National Gallery, Anchorage, Alaska
- 2014 STEiNUNN, Juneau City Hall, Alaska
- 2014 STEiNUNN, Fairbanks Museum, Alaska
- 2013 University of Reykjavík, MBA Business program, Reykjavík Iceland
- 2013 HDK Gothenburg Design School, Sweden
- 2013 Private Design School, Gothenburg, Sweden
- 2013 FISOS, Association of Icelandic Museums, National Heritage Museum
- 2013 "Rhythm Knitting " Nordic House Nuuk, Greenland
- 2013 "Rhythm Knitting " Kennedy Art Center for Performing Arts, Washington, D.C., USA
- 2012 Fashion gowns and corsilet, National Museum of Iceland
- 2011 Íslandsstofa, Icelandic Trade Council
- 2011 "Looking Back to find our Future", Nordic Fashion Biennale, Nordic Museum, Seattle, USA
- 2011 "Thinking Hands" National Museum of Iceland, Reykjavík Art School
- 2010 Beijing Fashion Institute of Technology, Beijing China
- 2009 University of Iceland, Reykjavík Iceland
- 2009 Nordic Council of Ministers, Kultur Forum, Felleshus - Nordic Embassies, Berlin, Germany
- 2009 CCP, Reykjavík Art Museum
- 2009 Lava 2009, Seminar, Iðnó, Reykjavík, Iceland
- 2009 Confederation of the Icelandic Employment (Santök Atvinnulífsins), Reykjavík, Iceland
- 2009 Innovation Conference, Nýsköpunarþing, Reykjavík, Iceland
- 2009 Verkmenntaskólinn á Akureyri, Island
- 2009 "Nordic Fashion Biennale" Nordic House, Reykjavík, Iceland
- 2009 Iðnskólinn í Hafnarfirði, Island
- 2009 Art teachers in Iceland, Listmenntakennarar á Íslandi
- 2008 Rhösska Design Museum Gothenborg, Söderberg Priz, Gothenburg, Sweden
- 2008 National Museum of Iceland, Norrænir safnverðir, Reykjavík
- 2008 FIT, New York Panel Discussion, New York, USA
- 2008 FIT, New York Fashion Design Students, New York, USA
- 2007 Skt. Petersburg Fashion Students, Nordic House, Iceland
- 2007 FIT, New York, Fashion Design Gallery, New York, USA
- 2007 Design Center, Klaus K., Helsinki Finland
- 2007 "Icelandic Fashion & Design", Nordic Embassies, Berlin, Germany
- 2006 Design students, Reykjavík Art School, Reykjavík, Iceland
- 2006 "Scandinavian House" Aalands Island, Finland
- 2006 "Retrospective", Nordatlantesbrygge Copenhagen
- 2006 "Fortíð – Nútíð" Textile Museum, Blöndósi
- 2006 "Sjónþing - a retrospective", Gallery Gerðuberg, Reykjavík
- 2005 Fashion Students, LHI, Icelandic Academy of art, Reykjavík, Iceland
- 2004 "Nordic cool", National Museum of Women in the Arts, Washington, USA
- 2004 WorkshopmNational Museum of Women in the Arts, Washington, USA
- 2004 "Nordic design" The Scandinavian House, Reykjavík, Iceland
