= La Perla (clothing) =

London-headquartered Italian lingerie and swimwear maker

- Type: Private company
- Industry: Fashion
- Founded: 1954; 72 years ago
- Founder: Ada Masotti
- Headquarters: London, United Kingdom
- Number of locations: 150
- Area served: Worldwide
- Key people: Ada Masotti (Founder) Alberto Masotti (President from 1981 to 2007), Olga Cantelli Masotti (Designer), Anna Masotti (Art Director) Silvio Scaglia (Chairman); Nicole Rendone (Creative Director)
- Products: Lingerie, beachwear, sleepwear, ready-to-wear, accessories
- Owner: La Perla Atelier
- Parent: Luxury Holding
- Website: www.laperla.com

La Perla is a London-headquartered Italian lingerie and swimwear maker owned by Peter Kern through Luxury Holding. The brand was founded by couturière Ada Masotti in Bologna in 1954.

== History ==
=== La Perla under Ada Masotti (1954-1981) ===
La Perla was founded in 1954 by couturière Ada Masotti in Bologna, Italy. As she developed her products, Masotti, who was trained as a corset-maker, would drape fabric directly on the female body to achieve awareness of line and movement.

In the 1960s, La Perla launched a lingerie line based on colorful, floral and checked patterns alongside the more traditional white, black and nude in line with the fashion of the time. At the same time, it also launched its first collections of bikinis and swimsuits.

In the 1970s, the company introduced a silk jersey triangle bra, which allowed for more movement and reflected fashion's preference for a smaller bust.

=== Under Alberto Masotti (1981-2007) ===
During the underwear boom that characterized the 1980s fashion scene, the company started its international expansion under the guidance of Alberto Masotti, the founder's son. Alberto Masotti took charge of the company in 1981 after he had earned his degree in Medicine from the University of Bologna. Meanwhile his wife, Olga Cantelli Masotti, became creative director for the brand. Olga was hired by Ada Masotti as a designer in 1972. In 1983 La Perla introduced the under-jacket, a lingerie item designed to be visible under the suiting of the era. In 1995 Anna Masotti – daughter of Alberto and Olga – was nominated head of communication. During her time in the family business Anna will be the brand ambassador and, in 2004 she will accept, with her father Alberto, the award La Kore (known as the Oscar of fashion) in Taormina, Italy.

In 1985, the company extended its production to men's underwear and beachwear.

Ada Masotti also created La Perla Maison, a collection featuring a range of handmade garments with embroidered inserts. In 1994, La Perla launched the Sculpture bra, signaling a shift in the brand's styling.

In 2000, Steinunn Sigurdardóttir became the Creative Director of La Perla's Ready-to-Wear. She introduced new fabrics and swimsuits. In 2006, actor Daniel Craig wore a pair of Grigioperla swimming trunks in 007 Casino Royale film. Later, Christie's organized a special auction celebrating the 50th anniversary of the first Bond film, and the La Perla trunks were sold for £44,450 in 2012.

In 2007, La Perla launched the Cage Bustier worn by Victoria Beckham in the video of "Headlines", the Spice Girls' reunion song. A capsule Cage collection was later launched, including the Cage top, which was worn by Beyoncé for her 2014 Grammy Awards performance. In 2011, La Perla collaborated with French couturier Jean Paul Gaultier. That same year, La Perla entered the shapewear sector with ShapeCouture, featuring distinctive tailored cuts, tulle inserts and openwork finishes.

=== Changes in ownership (2008-2018) ===
In October 2008, La Perla was sold to JH Partners, a San Francisco-based private equity firm focused on investments in services companies and luxury brands. After being acquired by Italian entrepreneur Silvio Scaglia and Pacific Global Management at an auction in July 2013 for €69 million, it was relaunched with a development strategy aimed at consolidating the identity of the brand.

In May 2014, the brand faced complaints following the use of mannequins depicting visible ribs and concave stomachs in its New York store; the mannequins were later removed. In June, it held the first menswear catwalk show at Pitti Uomo in Florence, presenting a loungewear and Beachwear collection.

In 2015, La Perla's first Atelier collection was shown during Couture Fashion Week in Paris; with this being the brand's first runway show there. In January 2018, a month of talks to be acquired by Fosun International ended in failure, as the Chinese company demonstrated its intention to transfer production to China.

After his Sapinda Group acquired La Perla in February 2018, Lars Windhorst announced Sapinda's pledge to maintain production at the company's plants in Portugal and Italy. In addition to receiving a new development strategy when it was relaunched, La Perla launched a made-to-measure collection at its flagship stores that same year, incorporating made-to-order lingerie.

Julia Haart was appointed creative director of La Perla in 2016 and held the role for a year, after working with the brand on accessories collaborations for two seasons. Its creative director and Chief Design Officer is Italian-American designer Nicole Rendone, who joined La Perla in 2021; left in 2023

=== Acquisition by Peter Kern (2025) ===
In February 2024, La Perla Manufacturing was declared insolvent months after La Perla Global Management (UK) went into liquidation. The following month, the firm appointed administrators in the UK.

In June 2025, it was reported that La Perla would be acquired by Peter Kern, saving it from liquidation. Four months later, it was announced that Kern had made the purchase, making the brand part of a company owned by his investment firm Luxury Holding.

== Publications ==
In 1997, collaborations with Italian photographer Marino Parisotto resulted in the publication of a photographic volume, Senso, portraying new La Perla styles. Senso was dedicated to the world of corsetry seen through the female gaze.

In 2012, Rizzoli New York City published La Perla. Lingerie & Desire, the first monographic book dedicated to the brand and its evolution over almost sixty years. Some chapters are dedicated to the history of the La Perla products, marketing (the origins, the 1960s, the 1970s, the 1980s and the 1990s) and advertorial images, while others are linked to "symbolic aesthetic concepts" such as Black, White, Body, Inspirations, Precious and Eros.
