= Public Connectivity System (SPC) =

The Public Connectivity System, also known as the System of Public Connectivity (SPC) is a network that connects Italy's government agencies, allowing them to share and exchange data and information resources. The system is managed by DigitPA.

== Establishment ==
The system was established and is governed by the Legislative Decree of February 28, 2005, no. 42. The Decree was in turn merged into the Legislative Decree of March 7, 2005, n. 82, defined as:

"the set of Infrastructure Technology rules and techniques for developing, sharing, integration and dissemination of information assets and government data, necessary to ensure basic interoperability and application cooperation and evolved computer systems and information flows, ensuring security, confidentiality and preservation of information assets and the autonomy of each government."

== Basic principles ==
- Develop architecture and organization to ensure a federated, polycentric and non-hierarchical system.
- Economize use of network services, maintaining interoperability and support for application cooperation.
- Develop markets and competition in information and communication technology.

== Security ==
Central coordination of safety management is carried out by CERT-SPC. The Local Unit Security (ULS) established in the domains related to SPC, in conjunction with the SOC (Security Operation Center) provides access to federated network SPC (Fastweb, Telecom, Wind and BT) to oversee the operational management and continuous operation. Until 2009, the management model of security in SPC also provided a Management Centre, whose duties were transferred to the SOC.
