= Ultrasonic (film) =

- Film poster
- Directed by: Rohit Colin Rao
- Written by: Rohit Colin Rao; Mike Maguire
- Produced by: Rohit Colin Rao; Seynabou Gaye
- Starring: Silas Gordon Brigham; Sam Repshas
- Cinematography: Rohit Colin Rao
- Edited by: Rohit Colin Rao
- Music by: Rohit Colin Rao
- Production company: Gitbox Studios
- Distributed by: Garden Thieves Pictures
- Release date: June 1, 2012
- Running time: 90 minutes
- Country: United States
- Language: English
- Budget: $22,000

Ultrasonic is a 2012 American film by Rohit Colin Rao. It was produced on a shoestring budget in Washington, DC and surrounding suburbs and premiered on March 3, 2012 at the DC Independent Film Festival. The film won the Best of Fest award at the DC Independent Film Festival and went on to receive a limited theatrical and on-demand distribution deal with Garden Thieves Pictures.

== Plot ==
Ultrasonic tells the tale of Simon York – music teacher, married, soon to be father. Simon plays in a band and dreams of one day getting paid to write music. For now, however, money is tight and Simon shelling out $2000 to record an album is an additional cause of stress on his marriage to Ruth.

Jonas is Ruth's troubled brother and spends his days handing out flyers and trying to, “open peoples’ eyes,” to his theories of conspiracies and injustices in the world. One night Simon hears what he thinks is a very real sound in an alleyway. The sound does not disappear and remains audible from his house. Ruth doesn’t hear it and she dismisses it, claiming that his ears are ringing from years of loud music.

Jonas’ reaction to Simon's ailment is much different than Ruth's. Jonas believes Simon and, after doing some research, believes that what Simon is hearing is in fact a government experiment, which utilizes an ultrasonic auditory signal to control the minds of all who hear it. Simon, with some prodding from Ruth, goes to visit an ear doctor who informs him that his test results show Simon's hearing to be least 6,000 Hz higher than the average human. This convinces Jonas that his theory is correct, and the two of them embark on a journey to get to the bottom of the sound experiment and stop the noise.

== Soundtrack ==
The Rock Songs - Ultrasonic begins and ends with a song. The songs were contributed by Rao's two previous bands, Tigertronic and The Translucents, playing the opening and closing songs of the movie, respectively. The songs were written by the bands, with lyrics and vocal performances by Rao. These songs will be on the soundtrack in addition to the electronica pieces that comprise the rest of the soundtrack.

The Electronica Songs - For the rest of the soundtrack, Rao utilized a relatively unknown piece of software called Renoise. Renoise allowed Rao to implement a technique known as beat-slicing to create the distinct frenetic feel of the electronic beats, and coupled it with analog instruments like the piano. The resulting pieces add a vibe of underlying tension to the film and help create the film's unique feel, often leaving the audience wondering if the sound that Simon hears is also the sounds that they are hearing on the soundtrack.

== Reception ==
Ultrasonic opened to middling reviews. The Washington Post called it "an impressive feat" while giving it two out of four stars. The soundtrack reaction was also split, with some critics lauding it as the star of the film while others calling it "monotonously percussive electronica that unfortunately serves to distance us from, rather than draw us into, Simon's private aural torment." Brent Simon of the Los Angeles Film Critics Association gave Ultrasonic its most positive review.
