= Phillip Scaglia =

American politician

Member of the U.S. House of Representatives from Missouri's 30th district

Missouri House of Representatives
- Incumbent
- Assumed office 1965

Personal details
- Born: 1918 Pueblo, Colorado, US
- Died: 1991 (aged 72–73)
- Party: Democratic
- Spouse: Patricia Lee Lyons
- Children: 2 (1 son, 1 daughter)
- Occupation: real estate and insurance broker

Phillip P. Scaglia (October 6, 1918 - 1991) was an American Democratic politician who served in the Missouri House of Representatives. He was born in Pueblo, Colorado, and was educated in Missouri public schools and the University of Missouri–Kansas City. On June 6, 1964, he married Patricia Lee Lyons.
