= Fastweb (telecommunications company) =

Italian telecommunications company

Fastweb S.p.A.

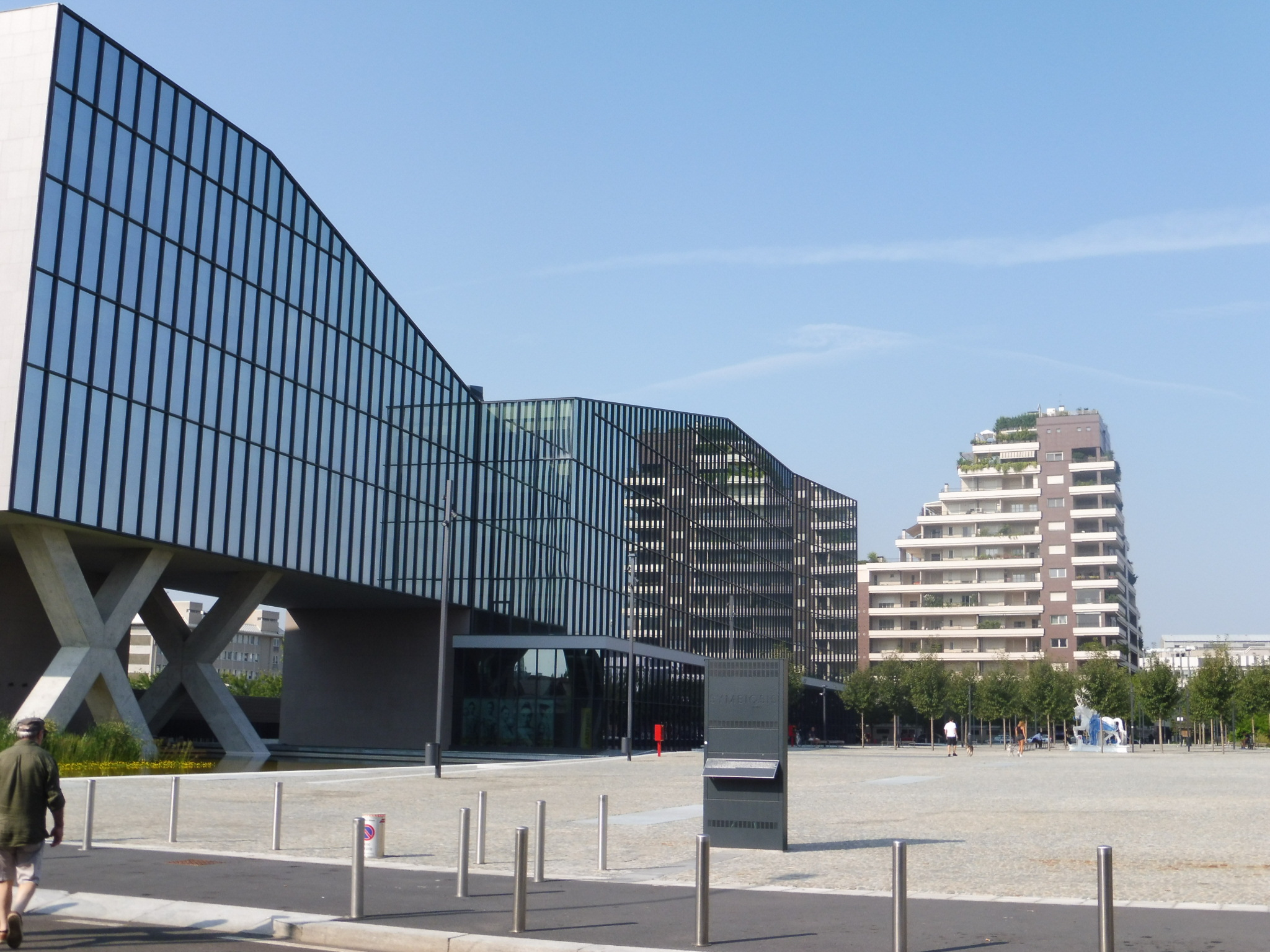
- Fastweb's headquarters in Milan, Italy
- Type: Subsidiary
- Traded as: BIT: FWB (delisted)
- ISIN: IT0001423562
- Industry: Telecommunications
- Founded: September 1999; 27 years ago
- Founder: e.Biscom; AEM
- Headquarters: Milan, Italy
- Area served: Italy
- Key people: Christoph Aeschlimann (Chairman); Eugen Stermetz (Vice-chairman); Walter Renna (General director)
- Services: Fixed and mobile telephony, Broadband Internet, IPTV
- Revenue: 2,809,000,000 euro (2024)
- Net income: 2.633 billion €
- Number of employees: 3417
- Parent: Swisscom
- Website: www.fastweb.it

Fastweb S.p.A. is an Italian telecommunications company that provides fixed and mobile telephony, broadband Internet and IPTV services. It is one of the leading providers of FTTH connections in Italy, and operates under the corporate brand Fastweb + Vodafone. Fastweb is a subsidiary of the Swiss telecommunications group Swisscom.

In May 2007, Swisscom acquired a controlling stake of 82.4% in Fastweb for €3 billion. The company later purchased the remaining shares from minority shareholders following a voluntary tender offer in September 2010, after which Fastweb was delisted from the Borsa Italiana.

On December 31, 2024, Swisscom acquired Vodafone Italy with the aim of merging it with Fastweb to form Fastweb + Vodafone. Vodafone Italy has been legally merged into Fastweb on January 1, 2026; however, Fastweb continues to operate the Vodafone brand separately, which will be gradually phased out by 2029.

Fastweb's main competitors are TIM, Wind Tre and Iliad.

== History ==
=== Founding ===
Fastweb was founded in 1999 in Milan as a joint venture between e.Biscom (founded by Silvio Scaglia, Francesco Micheli, and Ruggero Gramatica) and AEM, with the intention of developing a fiber-optic network and IP services in Italy.

In March 2000, e.Biscom went public on the Italian New Market Stock Exchange to expand and finance their fiber-optic network in major Italian cities. e.Biscom soon became the first operator in the world to use full IP technology and bring fiber-optic networks to cities, and launched home telecommunication services. In 2002, fiber-optic cabling was completed in Milan, and Fastweb consolidated its presence in Rome, Genoa, Turin, Naples, and Bologna.

=== Merger with e.Biscom ===
e.Biscom announced a possible merger with Fastweb in early 2004, and the merger was finalized by the end of April. The company took on Fastweb's name, and focused on its core business, creating broadband telecommunications on the Italian landline network.

=== Expansion and technological achievements ===
By 2006, Fastweb's broadband network had expanded to cover about 45 percent of Italy's population, and later that year, Fastweb won both a Consip and a Centro Nazionale per l'Informatica nella Pubblica Amministrazione (CNIPA) tender for the Public Connectivity System (SPC) becoming a supplier to relevant public authorities.

=== Swisscom acquisition ===
By 2006, Fastweb was Italy's leading alternative broadband telecommunications provider, boasting over one million customers and an annual revenue of €1.26 billion. In early 2007, Fastweb was bought by Swisscom, a major Swiss telecommunications provider, to strengthen new technologies and multimedia for Swisscom, while increasing cash flow and revenue.

=== Expansion under Swisscom ===
In 2008, Fastweb launched connections of up to 100 Mbit/s for small and medium enterprises in areas served by its fiber-optic network, making this connectivity speed available in Italy for the first time. Over the next year, Fastweb signed an agreement with Telecom Italia to promote the development of fiber-optic next-generation networks (NGN) by sharing infrastructure.

Fastweb worked to continue expanding faster service, and in 2010, their Fibra 100 service became available to residential consumers, and two million homes and businesses had the ability to use the Internet at 100 Mbit/s for the first time in Italy.

In 2015, Fastweb signed an agreement with Telecom Italia to become a full mobile virtual network operator (Full MVNO) to ensure better quality and coverage, including access to 4G and 4G+.

After continuing to grow, in 2018 Fastweb acquired Tiscali's fixed-wireless business, including full ownership of Tiscali's 5G, 3.5 GHz spectrum, in a deal worth approximately $176 million.

=== Acquisition of Vodafone Italia ===
Fastweb + Vodafone corporate identity logo used during the integration phase

On March 15, 2024, Swisscom signed a binding purchase proposal to acquire 100% of Vodafone Italia for €8 billion, with the goal of merging it with Fastweb. The transaction is expected to be completed by the first quarter of 2025. As part of the agreement, Vodafone will continue to provide certain services to Fastweb, as well as grant the use of its brand for a maximum period of five years.

On April 3, 2024, Fastweb also entered the electricity market.

In September 2024, the Antitrust Authority published a notice of investigation and launched an inquiry. Swisscom announced that the European Commission had approved the acquisition of Vodafone Italia under the Foreign Subsidies Regulation. The transaction was also approved by AGCOM and AGCM in November and December 2024, respectively.

On December 31, 2024, Swisscom, through Fastweb, completed the acquisition of Vodafone Italia for €8 billion, using Fastweb + Vodafone brand as the corporate identity during the transition period.

== ho-mobile ==
ho.

ho-mobile, stylized as ho., is an Italian mobile virtual network operator (MVNO) operating as a sub-brand of Fastweb. It was originally created to compete with Iliad in the Italian mobile telephony market.

The brand was founded by Vodafone Italy on January 23, 2017 as a low-cost operator, but the commercial launch of the service took place on June 22, 2018, a few weeks after Iliad entered the Italian market.

Following the acquisition of Vodafone Italy by Fastweb, which became effective on January 1, 2026, ownership of ho. was fully transferred to Fastweb. As a result, the company Vodafone Italia S.p.A. ceased to exist, and all legal ownership of the brand passed to Fastweb.

Although it obtained authorization from the Ministry of Economic Development to operate as a Full MVNO using the 379-1 prefix, the operator was launched as an ESP MVNO, adopting the 377-08 and 377-09 prefixes. The 379-1 and 379-2 prefixes were introduced at a later stage.

== Brand identity ==
Evolution of the company brand and logo:

2001–2002

2002–2004

2004–2010

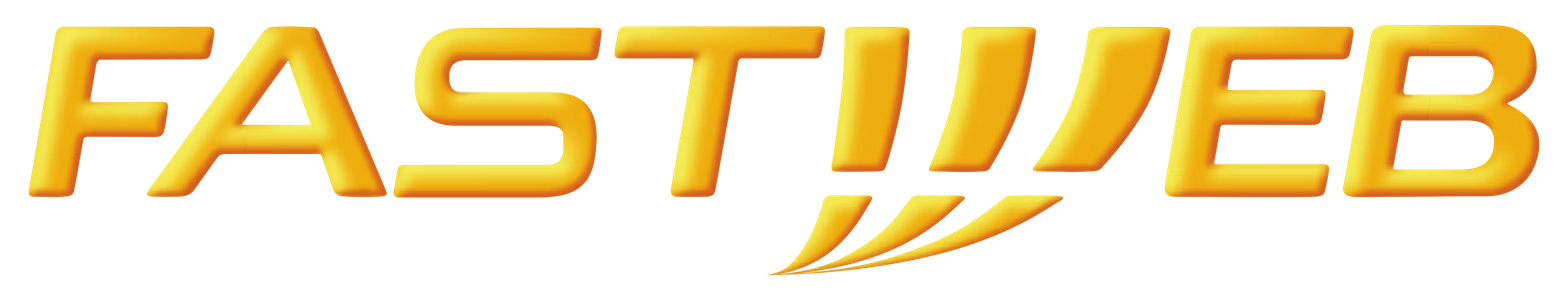
2010–2020

2020–present

== Network and services ==
Since its founding Fastweb has invested over €5 billion in a next-generation fiber-optic network spanning more than 32,000 km (20,000 mi). By implementing the Internet Protocol on its alternative fiber-optic network, Fastweb provides a Triple-Play Offer of landline, internet and television services, available simultaneously on a single connection, for residential and business clients.

In September 2010 and for the first time in Italy, Fastweb launched a broadband connection up to 100 Mbit/s for residential customers and small enterprises in the cities of Milan, Rome, Genoa, Turin, Bologna, Naples and Bari.

In September 2008, Fastweb became also a mobile virtual network operator (MVNO) and launched its mobile voice and data service (Quadruple Play).

In July 2019 became the fifth mobile network operator in Italy by obtaining the license to operate on 5G network.

Today, business customers account for 60% of the total revenue. On the government market, Fastweb became the main supplier of fixed network telephone and data services to central public agencies.

== Customers ==
=== Mobile telephony ===
As of June 2025, Fastweb+Vodafone has 33.0 million active mobile SIMs in total. It is the leading mobile network operator in Italy.

== Company structure ==
	Swisscom AG
	Fastweb S.p.A. 100%
VND S.p.A. 100%	Fastweb Retail S.p.A. 100%	7Layers S.r.l. 100%	NextMindLab S.r.l. 100%

== See also ==
- List of mobile network operators in Italy
- List of VoIP companies
- Swisscom
- Vodafone Italy

== Other sources ==
- "Fastweb SPA - Towards Real Energy-efficient Network Design". www.fp7-trend.eu.
- "Swisscom intends to acquire Fastweb, the successful broadband operator in Italy - Swisscom". www.swisscom.ch. Archived from the original on 25 August 2018.
- "eBiscom and FastWeb to Merge?". Light Reading.
- "eBiscom, FastWeb Merger Approved". Light Reading.
- "Fastweb - History and Innovation". Fastweb.it.
- "Eurobites: Fastweb Buys Tiscali's Fixed-Wireless Biz, 5G Spectrum". Light Reading.
- Meichtry, Stacy (13 September 2010). "Italy's Fastweb Joins Rivals as Broadband Prices Fall". Wall Street Journal – via www.wsj.com.
- Zega, Roxana (6 May 2015). "Swisscom Intends to Keep Italian Fastweb Business, CEO Says". Bloomberg.com.
- "Quotazioni, Azioni, Obbligazioni, ETF, Fondi, Indici - Borsa Italiana" (PDF). www.borsaitaliana.it.
- "Fastweb to deepen Vodafone ties". Financial Times. 14 January 2007.
- "Italy's FastWeb deploys networked personal video recording solution over its nationwide FTTH network". 24 June 2002.
