= Ludmila Ulehla =

American classical composer

Ludmila Ulehla (20 May 1923– 05 December 2009) was an American composer and music educator.

== Biography ==
Ludmila Ulehla was born in Flushing, Queens, New York. She began the study of piano and violin very early and wrote short compositions at the age of five. Later she studied composition under Vittorio Giannini at the Manhattan School of Music and was awarded a master's degree. Ulehla took a position on the faculty of the same school in 1947, and was Chair of the Composition Department from 1972 to 1989.

Ulehla was named Outstanding Educator in Who’s Who of American Women, and has received ASCAP awards. She wrote a book entitled Contemporary Harmony – Romanticism Through the 12-Tone Row which was published by Advance Music.

== Works ==
Ulehla's compositions were primarily for solo and chamber ensembles. Selected works include:

- Elegy for a Whale
- Gargoyles for Hindell
- Michelangelo for Orchestra
- Remembrances for Heifetz
- Unrolling a Chinese Scroll
- Sybil of the American Revolution, chamber opera, 1993
- Undersea Fantasy for Orchestra, 1999
- Sonata for Improvisation for clarinet, soprano saxophone and piano.
