= Bob Geary (police officer) =

American police officer and ventriloquist (1939–2025)

Robert J. Geary (November 22, 1939 – January 26, 2025) was an American police officer in the San Francisco Police Department who brought a ventriloquist's dummy called Brendan O'Smarty with him on foot patrol. When his supervisors banned this practice, Geary formed the "Committee to Save Puppet Officer Brendan O'Smarty" and self-financed a campaign to reinstate the puppet's patrol privileges, escalating the issue to a 1993 ballot measure in San Francisco's general election. Despite opposition from certain police and officials, it narrowly passed with a 51% to 49% margin.

== Early life ==
Geary earned an undergraduate degree in art, a master's in education, and four Medals of Valor. In an entertainment career, he worked as a hand model and starred opposite Don Johnson in a 1981 TV movie, The Two Lives of Carol Letner. He held memberships in the Screen Actors' Guild and AFTRA.

He became police officer at about 30. In the 1980s he became a favorite subject of San Francisco Chronicle columnist Herb Caen for his long-running feud with the city's taxicab drivers, who accused him of writing too many tickets to taxicabs. Officer Geary was jokingly declared "not guilty" of writing too many tickets to taxis at a satirical public event held in a North Beach theater that featured a stripper in the role of bailiff.

== Ballot initiatives ==
In 1988, budget constraints threatened the San Francisco Police Department's historic horse patrol program, in which Geary's then-girlfriend was a mounted police officer. Geary sponsored a ballot initiative to save the program, which passed with 86 percent of the local vote, the highest margin of any to date in the city.

In 1991 Geary was assigned to a community policing position in the North Beach neighborhood. The program encouraged officers to be "highly visible" and use "creative and ingenious methods" to earn the trust of local civilians. Geary decided to order an expensive wooden dummy out of a ventriloquist catalog. He bought an audiotape program to teach himself ventriloquy and practiced in front of a bathroom mirror. A friend suggested he name the dummy "Smarty" because "he's no dummy", but Geary wanted to give the doll more dignity and added "Brendan" and an O to make the doll Irish. Officer Geary brought Brendan O'Smarty on patrol outfitted in a doll-sized police uniform, badge, and a water pistol. The dummy "made lost children giggle, quieted domestic disputes and encouraged homeless people to move from doorways," wrote The New York Times. Despite carrying the dummy, Geary was able to function as an officer, chasing and tackling at least one suspect with dummy in hand.

In 1992, newly-appointed police chief Tony Ribera ordered Geary to stop bringing Officer Brendan O'Smarty on foot patrol. Despite an internal appeal, media attention, and public backlash, the San Francisco Police Department refused to rescind this order. The San Francisco board of supervisors passed a resolution urging the mayor to bring the dummy back by overriding the police chief, but he refused.

Geary formed the "Committee to Save Puppet Officer Brendan O'Smarty," and collected nearly 10,000 signatures in a self-financed campaign to bring the matter to a local referendum. The measure was certified to appear on the November 1993 ballot as follows:

Shall it be the policy of the people of San Francisco to allow Police Officer Bob Geary to decide when he may use his puppet Brendan O'Smarty while on duty?

Despite opposition from the police chief and others who considered the referendum an embarrassment, the measure passed by a narrow 51% to 49% margin. The puppet patrolled with Officer Geary throughout the 1990s and became, in addition to a local phenomenon, a celebrity at ventriloquist conventions nationwide. Geary and Brendan O'Smarty appear in the 2000 documentary Dummies!

=== Tax lawsuit ===
Geary spent approximately $10,000 on ballot measure efforts like petition circulation, which he deducted as business expenses on his 1993 tax return. However, the IRS disallowed the deduction and imposed a penalty for negligence in 1997, bringing national attention to the case. Geary appeared on Prime Time Live and Comedy Central. According to a public statement from the IRS, "when it comes to taxes, Officer O'Smarty is a dummy."

In 2000, the US Tax Court ruled against Geary, agreeing with the IRS, on the basis that expenses incurred on efforts to influence a general election many not be deducted under Internal Revenue Code section 162(e). Geary's deduction was reversed, and he was presented with back taxes and "accuracy" penalties. In his appeal, Geary said he sought merely to inform voters, but the Ninth Circuit Court of Appeals upheld the previous decision but reversed the accuracy penalties because Geary had taken the deductions in good faith. Geary criticized the IRS with the dummy in a SF Chronicle interview: "As Brendan says, they are anti-social American terrorists."

== Later years and death ==
In 1998 the police department named a horse for Geary. In 2000 Geary sued an advertising agency for using his likeness to promote the Colorado Lottery.

Officer Geary and Brendan O'Smarty retired from the police force in 2000. At age 60, he was the oldest beat cop walking the streets at the time. Then-mayor Willie Brown declared the day "Officer Geary Day." For his last day Geary went on patrol in a Wells-Fargo stagecoach drawn by four horses.

Geary died at an assisted living facility in South San Francisco, on January 26, 2025, at the age of 85.
