= Michelle-Marie Heinemann Scaglia =

American business woman and socialite

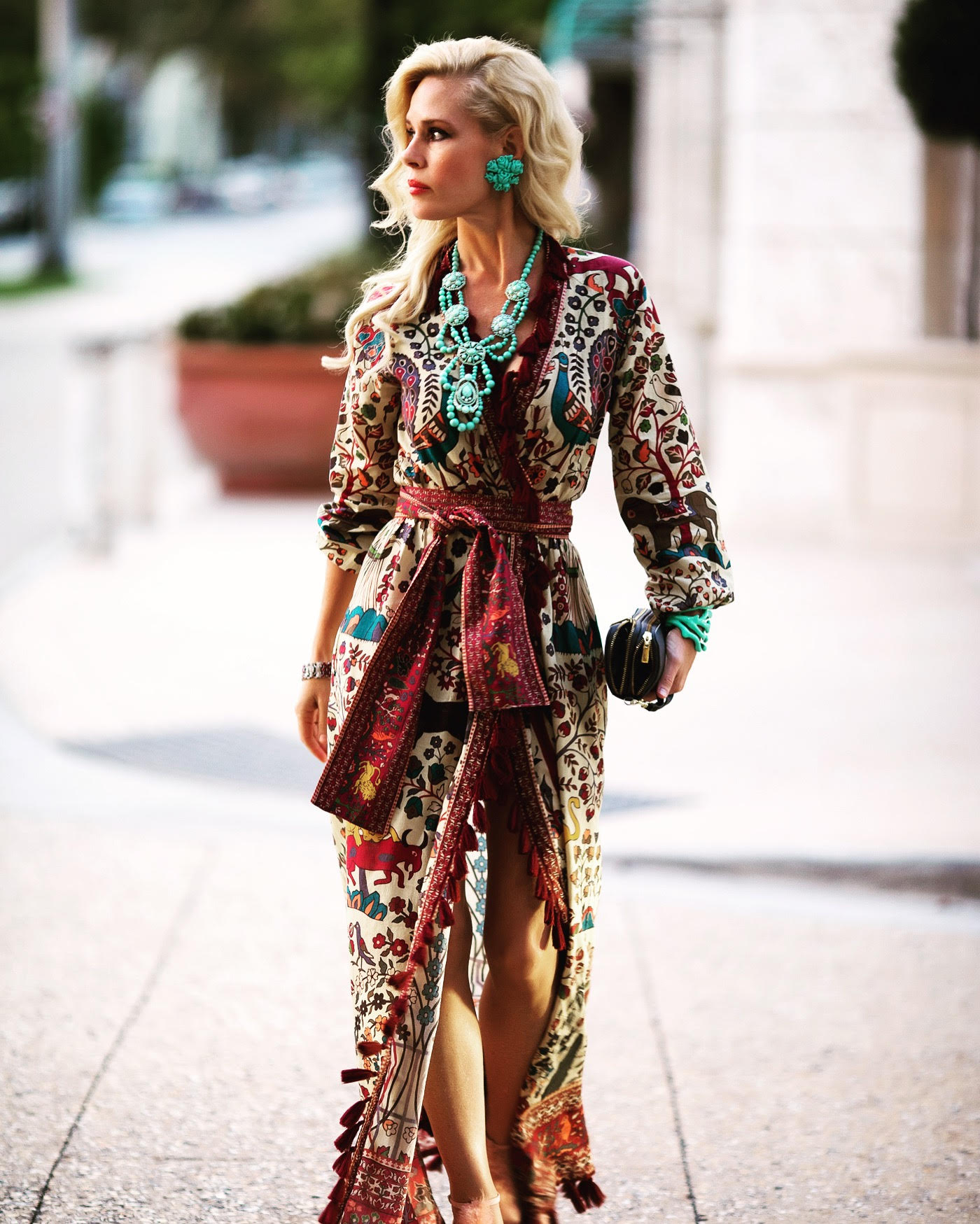
- Born: Michelle-Marie Parrott; January 19, 1966 (age 60); Atlanta, Georgia, US
- Education: New York University

Michelle-Marie Heinemann (born Michelle-Marie Parrott, 19 January 1966) is an American business woman and socialite in New York City. She is the CEO of Old Fashioned Mom LLC, a luxury lifestyle brand founded in 2015 and board member of the Elite World. She has recorded two albums and exhibited her artwork in various countries, including US, Germany and Switzerland.

== Biography ==
Michelle-Marie Heinemann was born on January 19, 1966, in Atlanta. At the age of 18, she moved to Paris, but later returned to the United States. She moved to New York City in 1995.

Heinemann graduated from New York University, where she studied journalism.

She also attended Lee Strasberg Theatre & Film Institute in New York and studied at the Art Students League of New York.

In January 2023 Michelle Marie Heinemann legally changed her name to Michelle-Marie Scaglia.

== Business ==
In 2014, she founded Old Fashioned Mom LLC a company specializing in broadcasting, media, public relations, apparel, accessories, jewelry, beauty, home goods, coffee, and more.

On 12 April 2023 she became a director in the board of the Elite World Group (EWG), a network of model management agencies. She now sits alongside Paolo Barbieri, the group's CEO.

== Philanthropy ==
Michelle-Marie Heinemann established the Flower Tree Foundation, placing hundreds of flower tree sculptures in universities and public settings throughout the country.

In August 2025, Heinemann was awarded an honorary Doctor of Humane Letters by the New College of Florida in recognition of her philanthropic work, including the founding of Blankets for Warmth.

In 2005, Heinemann founded Blankets for Warmth, a nonprofit organization partnering with the National Coalition for the Homeless (NCH), that provides assistance to homeless people in Manhattan.

She served on the boards of directors at Diller-Quaile School of Music and the Academy of Saint Joseph.

Heinemann was awarded Goodwill Ambassador from the Swiss boarding school Le Rosey and was the Goodwill Ambassador to Utterly Global Youth Empowerment and trustee to the board.

Heinemann also carried out philanthropic actions for the NGO Utterly Global Youth Empowerment.

== Personal life ==
Michelle-Marie Heinemann is engaged to the Italian entrepreneur Silvio Scaglia. In January 2023 it was announced that she legally changed her name to Michelle-Marie Scaglia.

During her marriage to the Norwegian financier Bjorn Aaserod, she was known as Michelle Aaserod, but she dropped that name after their divorce and used her original middle name as her last name. Heinemann has two children, Hudson and Hyacinth.
