= Patrick Scaglia =

- Born: United States of America
- Known for: chairman of the Y Combinator Research's project Human Advancement Research Community

Patrick Scaglia is chairman of the Y Combinator Research's project Human Advancement Research Community (HARC). Before that, he was co-director of Foundry@CITRIS and a Hewlett Packard executive for twelve years.
