= Centro Nazionale per l'Informatica nella Pubblica Amministrazione =

The Centro Nazionale per l'Informatica nella Pubblica Amministrazione ("The National Centre for IT in the Public Administration") or CNIPA (replaced in 2009 by DigitPA and, in 2012, by AgID) was an Italian public body which operated at the Presidency of the Council of Ministers for the implementation of the policies of the Minister for Innovation and Technology, with technical autonomy, functional, administrative, accounting and financial and independence of mind. It was established by Legislative Decree 30 June 2003, n. 196 Art. 176 (Code for the protection of personal data) in place of the Authority for IT in Public Administration (AIPA), which retains its powers. It has also been assigned by the Legislative Decree of 5 December 2003, n. 343 tasks, functions and activities carried out by the Technical Centre for the Unified Network of Public Administration (RUPA), including financial resources and equipment, as well as human resources.

By law, "the Centre is a collegial body composed of the Chairman and four members from among persons of high and recognized competence and professionalism and unquestioned morality and independence. The president is appointed by decree of President of the Council of Ministers, after deliberations of the Council of Ministers. Within fifteen days of the appointment of the President, on a proposal from the President of the Council of Ministers appointed by a decree, after consideration by the Council of Ministers, the other four members."

== Institutional responsibilities ==
Its tasks are also defined by law:

- Dictate technical standards and criteria relating to planning, design, implementation, management and maintenance of automated information systems of public administrations and their interconnections, and their quality and organizational aspects; dictate technical criteria relating to safety systems.
- Coordinate, through the drafting of a three-year plan reviewed annually, the projects and the main development interventions and management of automated information systems of government.
- Promote, in consultation and with the financial participation of the authorities concerned, projects and intersectoral infrastructure and telematics provided by the three-year plan and supervise the implementation of the same even when involving non-State administrative, processing based on agreements to be reached through a service, under current law.
- Check periodically, in agreement with the administrations concerned, the results achieved in individual administrations, especially with regard to costs and benefits of automated information systems, including through the adoption of metrics for assessing the effectiveness, efficiency and quality.
- Establish guidelines and directives for the preparation of plans for training of staff in the field of automated information systems and programs for the recruitment of specialists, and directing the overall training of the staff of the government towards the use of computer technology, d ' agreement with the School of Public Administration.
- Provide advice to the Prime Minister for the evaluation of draft laws relating to automated information systems.
- In matters within its competence and the technical-operational aspects, to heal relations with the organs of the European Communities and participate in international bodies and, according to the President of the Council of Ministers.
- Propose to the President of the Council of Ministers the adoption of recommendations and actions to address the regions, local entities and their instrumental or supervised dealers and utilities.
- Settle and resolve operational disputes between the administrations concerning automated information systems.
- Undertake any other useful function to get the most rational use of information systems also in order to eliminate duplication and overlap of delivery information.

== History ==
The AIPA, from which the CNIPA is partly inherited, was established in 1993 in a climate of concern for the efficiency of public administration. That climate, prevalent in many developed countries, is reflected in particular by the National Partnership for Reinventing Government launched in the U.S. by Bill Clinton and Al Gore in the same year.

Legislative Decree 39/1993 had outlined the AIPA in part as an independent and partly as an agency operative. Were provided for both tasks of monitoring the market of information public through the issuance of fairness opinions on technical and economic contracts concluded by more administrations of the state, both the tasks of promotion and implementation of large infrastructure projects, such as the United Network of public administration or the linking of databases and information systems of each administration. Besides these tasks, the AIPA also had to perform functions of public monitoring of data and produce annual reports to the Government and Parliament.

An article by Manlio Cammarata published in 1994 (Public administration: the future begins?) may be useful to understand the context and the tensions within which the AIPA began to operate. Over the following years, the AIPA, however, failed to find a complete organizational and institutional placement.

A turning point came in 2001 when, at the change of government, the dell'AIPA contribution to the achievement of its objectives was the object of heavy criticism, expressed repeatedly in the press by the new Minister for Innovation and Technology, Lucio Stanca (Report Italiamonitor 10/2003 - Minister Stanca). As promised by the government, after many vicissitudes the AIPA legislation was abolished in 2003 and absorbed along with the Technical Center of RUPA (United Network of Public Administration) from CNIPA.

It is not easy to give a comprehensive assessment of the work and dell'AIPA CNIPA. An important part of the official documentation is not available on site. Fairness opinions on major contracts, for example, are published only some summary statistics with details of the potential savings that would be obtained. Even after the work of CNIPA was bound by law to implement a plan of government e-government published periodic reports on the achievement of objectives.

Finally awakened surprise that a body should be one of the main instruments of innovation in public administration since 1993 is devoid of a regulation of staff and therefore must rely, as required by its standard set-up, only to personnel of other government employees and precarious.
