= Caterina Scoglio =

Italian network scientist and computer engineer

Caterina Maria Scoglio is an Italian network scientist and computer engineer, the LeRoy and Aileen Paslay Professor of Electrical and Computer Engineering at Kansas State University, the director of the Network Science and Engineering Group in the department, and the former chair of the IEEE Control Systems Society Technical Committee on Medical and Health Care Systems.

== Education and career ==
Scoglio earned a doctorate from Sapienza University of Rome in 1987. After working as a researcher at the Fondazione Ugo Bordoni from 1987 to 2000, and at Georgia Tech from 2000 to 2005, she moved to Kansas State in 2005. She was named Pasley Professor in 2016.

== Research ==
Topics in Scoglio's research include the epidemiology of Ebola and the Zika virus, and applications of network science to the immune systems of mosquitos.
