= Silvio Scaglia =

Swiss-born Italian entrepreneur (born 1958)

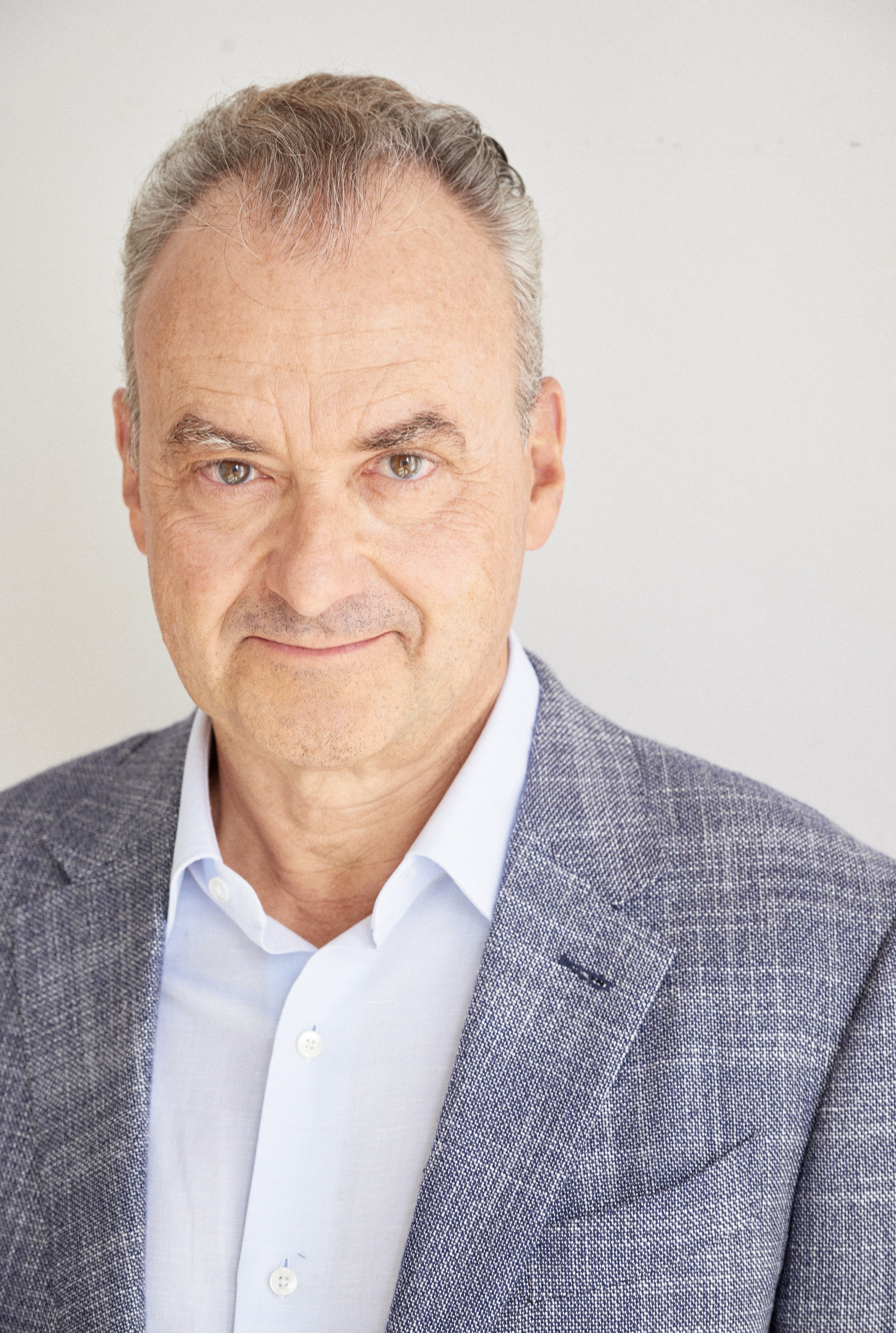
- Scaglia in 2022
- Born: 14 October 1958 (age 68); Lucerne Switzerland
- Occupation: Entrepreneur
- Known for: Founding Fastweb
- Spouses: Monica Aschei (div. 2018); Julia Haart (m. 2019; sep. 2022)

Silvio Scaglia (born 14 October 1958) is a Swiss-born media and technological entrepreneur. Scaglia is the founder of Fastweb, an Italian telecommunications company. Scaglia is the co-owner of Freedom Holding (formerly Pacific Global Management Group), a holding company that controls the Elite World Group. In 2020, he founded SHS management, an AI-powered asset management company.

== Early life and education ==
Scaglia was born on 14 October 1958, in Lucerne, Switzerland. He studied at the Polytechnic University of Turin, which he graduated from in 1983 with a degree cum laude in electronic engineering.

== Career ==
=== Early career ===
After graduation, Scaglia began working at Aeritalia Spazio, where for a time he worked on the Tethered satellite project in partnership with NASA and Martin Marietta, an American aerospace company.

Following his position at Aeritalia Spazio, Scaglia worked for Andersen Consulting as a programmer and then project manager for three years.

In 1986, Scaglia joined McKinsey & Company, a worldwide management consulting firm, where he worked for automotive industry clients in Germany and Italy.

Scaglia also served as a consultant for Italian motor vehicle manufacturer Piaggio & C. SpA.

During the early 1990s, Scaglia became general manager for Piaggio's Spanish subsidiary, working alongside Italian industrialist Giovanni Alberto Agnelli. He was later appointed Senior Vice President at Piaggio, where he led the relaunch of the business outside Europe and re-established the company’s presence in China, India and Latin America under the leadership of Agnelli.

=== Omnitel ===
In 1995, Scaglia joined Omnitel, as CEO, where he led the start-up of the company after they had received the second mobile telephone licence in 1994. Scaglia served as CEO of Omnitel until 1999.

=== Fastweb ===
During his time at Omnitel, Scaglia understood that the technology was now ready to create a fully integrated IP telecommunications network. In July 1999, Scaglia launched e.Biscom along with financier Francesco Micheli and other executives. It was founded with the intention of developing a fully IP, triple-play, fibre-optic network in Italy. e.Biscom became the first operator in the world to use full IP technology and bring fibre-optic networks to both business and residential clients, and launched home telecommunication services.

In March 2000, e.Biscom went public on the Italian New Market Stock Exchange to expand and finance their fibre-optic network in major Italian cities. The IPO of e.Biscom was the second most successful in Italian history. The company reached a valuation of over 10 billion euros and raised 1.6 billion euros which were fully invested to develop Fastweb’s network nationwide.

In January 2001, Scaglia was featured on the cover of Forbes Magazine, in recognition of Fastweb's contribution to telecommunications technology. In 2003, Scaglia was named on the Time Magazine list of most influential innovators in the new technology. He was the only Italian to appear on the “tech survivors” list, a list of fifteen innovation gurus who weathered the boom of the new economy.

In 2004, e.Biscom announced a merger with Fastweb. The merger was finalized by the end of April 2004. e.Biscom took on Fastweb's name, and focused on its core business, creating broadband telecommunications on the Italian landline network.

By 2006, Fastweb was Italy's leading alternative broadband telecommunications provider, with over one million customers and an annual revenue of €1.26 billion. Fastweb was the first company in the world to develop a network entirely based on Internet Protocol (IP) – a system that moves digitalized telephonic communications through routers rather than through traditional telephone exchange allowing voice, broadband data and video to share the same network. It was also the first company in the world to develop a public network using fibre optics for retail consumers. On 12 March 2007, Swisscom, the Swiss telecommunications provider, offered 5.7 billion Euros to acquire Fastweb.

On 10 April 2007, Scaglia, Fastweb's majority shareholder, sold his shares in the company, equivalent to 18.7% of the company's share capital, to Swisscom. Scaglia remained at the company as an administrator of the Board of Directors before leaving on 19 June 2007.

=== Babelgum ===
On 5 March 2007, Scaglia founded Babelgum, an interactive television platform offering free, high definition video content on demand. He described it as “a kind of professional alternative to YouTube.” The company aimed to combine the “immersive viewing experience” and visual quality of traditional television with the features made possible by the internet.

On 1 September 2007, Babelgum launched the Babelgum Online Film Festival, the first global online film festival dedicated to independent film. Viewers voted for the shortlists while a professional jury, chaired by Spike Lee, selected the winners. Lee said the platform was an innovative format for young filmmakers to showcase their talents.

In 2008, The CEO Erik Lumer was dismissed, which led the original CTO Mallku Caballero and his chief architect Gianni Scenini to leave in opposition. Babelgum's chief operating officer Michael O'Callaghan, quit a few months after. In 2012, after interrupted activity due to Scaglia's legal issues, Babelgum went into liquidation and the platform was shuttered.

=== Elite World ===
In 2011, Scaglia acquired Elite World, the largest international network of model management agencies and world’s first talent media network.

In the years immediately following its acquisition by Scaglia, Elite World saw a significant boost in its business: with a new focus on digital marketing strategies and strategic acquisitions, the company was well-positioned for growth. It was the first international network of modelling agencies to open an office in China, in Shanghai, in 2012. In 2013, Elite World launched The Society Management New York. In that same year, it acquired Women Management in both New York and Paris.

=== La Perla ===
On 4 June 2013, Scaglia's SMS Finance firm won a bid to acquire lingerie and fashion brand La Perla with an offer of 69 million euros. In an interview with daily La Repubblica, he said, “After Omnitel and Fastweb I will personally give La Perla my all: for me, this is a personal challenge I am firmly committed to” attempting to quash the doubts raised over the genuineness of his interest in supporting La Perla.

Under Scaglia's leadership, La Perla underwent significant brand repositioning which despite a rise in sales, left the company unable to recoup the capital invested.

In February 2018, La Perla was sold to Sapinda Holding.

=== Yewno ===
In 2016, through his Pacific Capital investment fund (now Freedom Holding Inc.), Scaglia invested in Yewno, the “discovery platform” developed by Ruggero Gramatica through contributions from Stanford University.

=== SHS ===
In 2020 Scaglia founded SHS A.M., a knowledge-based, quantitative asset management company.

== Legal troubles ==
Between 2010 and 2013, Scaglia was accused of fraud. He was ultimately acquitted of all charges that Giancarlo Capaldo, a public prosecutor in Rome, had levelled against him.

=== Fastweb investigation - Telecom Italia Sparkle ===
As former CEO of Fastweb, Scaglia was under investigation for the crime of “conspiracy to commit tax fraud” in the Fastweb-Telecom Italia Sparkle investigation. The alleged tax evasion crimes, brought on by various paid service operators which used the Fastweb and Telecom Italia Sparkle networks, were said to have occurred between 2003-2006.

On 23 February 2010, the Rome judge overseeing preliminary investigations issued a preventive detention order for Scaglia, among others, in response to a request by the anti-mafia public prosecutor's office. Through his lawyers, Scaglia agreed to come in for questioning and returned to Italy on a private flight from Antigua on 26 February 2010.

On 23 November 2010, the trial began. On 24 February 2011, after nearly a year of preventive detention, Scaglia was released on the order of judges of the First Penal Section of the Court of Rome.

On 17 October 2013, the same court issued a sentence acquitting Scaglia of all charges and establishing his “complete non-involvement in the matter." On 27 September 2017, Rome's Court of Appeal upheld the acquittal of Silvio Scaglia in agreement with the 2013 verdict of the First Penal Section of the Court of Rome.

The national press largely reported on the incident, qualifying the court case as “unjust” and a process which “damaged the national economy”.

On 27 October 2013, Scaglia's judicial ordeal was quoted by the soon-to-be prime minister Matteo Renzi at the Leopolda meeting in Florence as an injustice that should no longer occur.

=== Legal Disputes and Fraud Lawsuits ===
In February 2022, after his then-wife Julia Haart filed for divorce, Scaglia dismissed Haart from her role as CEO of Elite World Group (EWG), the company they co-owned. Haart contested her dismissal, claiming that as a 50% owner of EWG, she could not be removed without her consent. However, in August 2022, the Delaware Chancery Court ruled that Haart owned 49.99%, therefore Scaglia was the controlling shareholder.

==== Fraud Lawsuit ====
In February 2023, Julia Haart filed a fraud lawsuit against Silvio Scaglia, Paolo Barbieri, Jeffrey Feinman, and the accounting firm, DDK & Company. Haart alleged that Scaglia misrepresented her ownership in the company. The lawsuit was initially dismissed by the court, but Haart appealed the decision. In October 2024, the Supreme Court of the State of New York Appellate Division granted Haart the appeal and allowed the fraud case to proceed.

==== Warrant for Arrest ====
In 2024, additional legal issues surfaced. In June, a New York court issued an arrest warrant for Scaglia after he was found in contempt of court for failing to pay $300,000 in legal fees to Haart, which had been ordered as part of the ongoing litigation. Scaglia was sentenced to a non-recourse 20 days in jail for non-compliance with the court's orders.

Later in 2024, Scaglia's financial status became a subject of legal scrutiny. In September, he requested a court-appointed attorney, citing financial hardship. Haart's legal team contested this, pointing to reports that Scaglia had spent time on yachts and private jets during the summer. These financial issues remain unresolved as part of the broader legal conflict.

===== Divorce Decision =====
In January 2025, the Honorable Judge Pearlman ruled that Julia Haart owns 50% of all disputed entities including Elite World Group, Freedom Holding, and a 65 million-dollar apartment. Judge Pearlman further ruled that Haart has power of attorney over Scaglia's ownership of the assets, thereby giving Haart full control over all companies and assets listed above.

== Personal life ==
Scaglia’s first wife was Monica Aschei. He announced his intention to divorce in 2017 which was finalized in 2018.

Scaglia has three adult children from his first marriage. His oldest, Chiara Scaglia, was previously in a leadership position at La Perla and continues to work in the fashion industry. Scaglia was married to Julia Haart. In early 2022, Haart filed for divorce.

Scaglia is currently engaged to socialite Michelle-Marie Heinemann. In January 2023 it was announced that Mrs. Michelle-Marie Heinemann legally took the surname of Scaglia.

On 1 March 2010, he was number 937 on the Forbes list of the world's billionaires. In 2024, Scaglia did not qualify to be on the list.

In 2024, Scaglia's financial status has dissipated as he requested a court-appointed attorney in his legal battles with Julia Haart, citing financial hardship.
