= Shining Night: A Portrait of Composer Morten Lauridsen =

2012 American documentary film

- Theatrical release poster
- Directed by: Michael Stillwater
- Produced by: Michael Stillwater; Doris Laesser Stillwater; Song Without Borders
- Music by: Morten Lauridsen
- Release date: February 7, 2012 (U.S.)
- Running time: 74 minutes
- Country: United States
- Language: English

Shining Night: A Portrait of Composer Morten Lauridsen is a 2012 documentary film about the American choral composer Morten Lauridsen, (b. February 27, 1943), National Medal of Arts recipient (2007) and most-performed living American choral composer.

== Summary ==
The 74-minute Song Without Borders film directed by Michael Stillwater, co-produced with Doris Laesser Stillwater, interweaves footage of the composer's remote island residency in the Pacific Northwest with interviews and performances in America and Scotland. Included in the documentary are perspectives from poet and former National Endowment for the Arts chairman Dana Gioia, conductor Robert Geary, composer/conductor Paul Mealor, conductor Paul Salamunovich, and composer Alex Shapiro, along with commentaries from other conductors, composers and singers.

Performances by San Francisco Choral Society, University of Aberdeen Choral Society and Orchestra, Con Anima Chamber Choir and Volti, are featured in the film. Works include O Magnum Mysterium, Lux Aeterna, Madrigali, Dirait-on, and Nocturnes, with soundtracks by Polyphony (choir) and Britten Sinfonia (conducted by Stephen Layton), The Singers - Minnesota Choral Artists (conducted by Matthew Culloton), and the Dale Warland Singers (conducted by Dale Warland).

== Screening ==
Premiered on February 7, 2012 in Palm Springs, California as a prelude event to the 1st American Documentary Film Festival, the screening was followed by a choral performance by the USC Chamber Singers conducted by Jo-Michael Scheibe and accompanied by the composer on piano.

The New York premiere was hosted by Distinguished Concerts International New York on March 30, 2012, introduced by composer/conductor Eric Whitacre and attended by Lauridsen, followed by a Lincoln Center performance of Lux Aeterna and Carnegie Hall performances of Sure On This Shining Night and Dirait-on, conducted by Whitacre and accompanied on piano by Lauridsen.

The San Francisco premiere was hosted by vocal group Volti on June 12, 2012, at the Brava Theater, and the Los Angeles Premiere was hosted by the Visions & Voices Series on November 2, 2012 at USC's Bovard Auditorium The film was also screened at the 2012 Chorus America conference in Minneapolis and the 2012 World Choir Games in Cincinnati, Ohio, the American Choral Directors Association (ACDA) national and regional conferences in Dallas, TX, (March 2013) and Santa Barbara, CA, (February 2014), the 50th Anniversary of the Los Angeles Master Chorale (March 2014), and the World Choir Games in Riga, Latvia (July, 2014).

Beginning in 2012, the film has premiered in theater, festival and concert hall screenings across America and internationally, including Scotland, Switzerland, Germany, Austria, England, Wales, Denmark, South Africa, Poland, and Canada, often hosted by choral societies. Public television broadcasts via KCET Southern California are scheduled for 2013-2014. A 56-minute version of the film was produced for public television broadcast and conference/university use, included on the DVD beginning in the 2nd edition.

== Awards and nominations ==
2012 – Won, Best Documentary, Grand Jury Award, DC Independent Film Festival

2012 – Won, Best Documentary/International Subject, Eugene International Film Festival

2012 – Won, Honorable Mention, Los Angeles Movie Awards

2012 – Won, Bronze, Oregon Film Awards

2012 – Nominated, Best Documentary, Cincinnati Film Festival

2013 - Won, Audience Choice Award, Friday Harbor Film Festival, San Juan Island, WA

2014 - Won, Best Documentary Award, Asheville Cinema Festival, Asheville, NC

== Responses ==
Terry Teachout, Wall Street Journal: '"a heartening rarity- a thoroughly intelligent classical-music program that strikes an appropriate balance between words and music."

Kay Pollak, director of Oscar-nominated film, As It Is In Heaven: "a masterpiece about a music master".

Kevin Starr, National Humanities Medalist 2006, "Magnificent music, cinematography, and commentary! Thanks to Shining Night, America's premier composer of choral music receives a tribute that underscores the power of his music to elevate the spirit and create community."

Grant Gershon, Music Director, Los Angeles Master Chorale: "Shining Night provides enormous insight into Lauridsen's work capturing much of the essence of both the sound and structure of his art, and why it touches listeners and performers so deeply."

Eric Whitacre, composer/conductor, "Conveys the musical legend and the gentle, introspective genius."

Stephen Levine (author) and Ondrea Levine, 'A Year To Live,' "Shining Night documents the sounds in the atmosphere when the earth was being formed. It is the melody of the spheres discovered in depth consciousness. In the fine net of his art, Stillwater has captured the unnamable. We loved the film and recommend it highly."

Therese Schroeder-Sheker, founder, Chalice of Repose, "One of the most beautiful and uplifting pieces... moved me to tears of gratitude, joy, and more."

Jim Tusty, co-director of the film The Singing Revolution: "Stillwater's filmic style is sympatico with Lauridsen's delivery-a fascinating film to watch."

Tim Sharp, Executive Director, American Choral Directors Association: "Illuminates the person behind the music, giving us a rare glimpse into its creative source."

Jim Garrison (theologian), founder, State of the World Forum, "a masterpiece..the film distills the etheric purity of Lauridsen's music"

Don Schwartz, CineSource Magazine, May 2012: "a multi-level treat"

Diane Krieger, USC Arts & Culture Oct. 31, 2012: "layers misty vistas...over soul-stirring passages of (Lauridsen's) choral works."

Steve Weiss, Executive Director, No Festival Required, Phoenix Chorale Website "Gorgeous filmmaking and beautiful music from a contemporary genius, Shining Night is a must-see for those who love the performing arts!" (Arizona premiere with Phoenix Chorale, January, 2013)

Jason Becker, composer/guitarist, "An absolutely beautiful movie about a composer whose music is truly the voice of God. I am so inspired, musically, personally and spiritually."

Constance Demby, composer/recording artist, "a gem, a masterpiece; deeply moving, absorbing...a fantastic experience."

== DVD distribution ==
June, 2012: Hal Leonard Corporation, publisher of sheet music (and largest distributor of Morten Lauridsen's music), began distribution of the DVD with a promotion to choral directors throughout US and Canada.

June, 2012: Faber Music, UK distributor of Morten Lauridsen's music, began UK distribution of the DVD.

June, 2014: Hänssler (hänssler CLASSIC), a German music publishing house, began distribution to Europe and internationally.

== Book publication ==
GIA Publications, Chicago, released a companion giftbook to the film (2013), entitled Morten Lauridsen's Waldron Island Reflections, containing images and text from the film. Photographed and edited by film director Michael Stillwater.

== Background ==
Originally developed from an interview with the composer at a Volti rehearsal of Nocturnes in San Francisco in May, 2010, Shining Night is a Song Without Borders film co-produced by Michael Stillwater and Doris Laesser Stillwater, the first episode in the documentary series, In Search of The Great Song, exploring and celebrating the transformative dimension of song.

The director, Michael Stillwater, is a songwriter and music educator, developer of the SongSourcing method for spontaneous songmaking, recording artist of a dozen CDs of contemplative songs and inspirational music, co-author of Graceful Passages: A Companion for Living and Dying, published by New World Library, 2002, applying music and spoken word as a palliative care approach, and co-authored Music at the End of Life. In 2005 he received, together with Gary Malkin, Roshi Joan Halifax, and Frank Ostaseski, the Elisabeth Kubler-Ross Award for End of Life Service from the Chaplaincy Institute for Arts and Interfaith Ministries in Berkeley, California.

== Articles and reviews ==
- Wall Street Journal, article by Terry Teachout "The Best Composer You've Never Heard Of" Retrieved 4-15-2012
- Film Website Retrieved 4-15-2012
- Film FaceBook Page Retrieved 4-15-2012
- Film Trailer Retrieved 4-15-2012
- Deep Cinema, Review by Mary Trainor-Brigham, Retrieved 6-21-2012
- The Oregonian, Review by David Stabler, Retrieved 6-21-2012
- Oregon Arts Watch, Review by Brett Campbell Retrieved 6-21-2012
- Crisis Magazine, Review by Robert Reilly Retrieved 10-13-2012
- The Salt Lake Tribune, Article by Rebecca Howard Retrieved 1-28-2013
- Oregon Public Broadcasting, Article by Geoff Norcross Retrieved 11-16-13
