= DC Independent Film Festival =

- Location: Washington, D.C.
- Founded: 1999
- Awards: Kennedy Center and US Department of State
- Website: dciff-indie.org

The DC Independent Film Festival (DCIFF) is a film festival in Washington, D.C. Launched in 1999, DCIFF exhibits features, animation, shorts and documentaries from around the world, focusing on cutting-edge ideas, new visions and advances in the craft of filmmaking. The festival hosts world premieres, seminars, and workshops, and also sponsors discussions on topics that impact independent filmmakers, in particular the annual "On the Hill" hearing hosted by the Congressional Entertainment Caucus. The festival includes a dedicated POLIDOCS section for documentary films that shed light on human rights, politics and social justice and an international high school film competition started in 2013. The festival also has an oral history collection program Going to the Movies documenting the role of movie-watching in US cultural history.

DCIFF has continued to be an essentially volunteer-run festival. DCIFF has not been a curated festival. With the exception of retrospectives and honorees, all films screened are chosen through the submissions process. As of 2019, the festival has embraced the concept of deep discussion about the film and increased interaction between films, filmmakers and audiences.

The festival was founded by Carol Bidault de L'Isle who was executive director until 2011 when Deirdre Evans-Pritchard assumed the role.

== 2010 ==
Held at the Arleigh Burke Theater, the 2010 festival hosted the documentary "The Quantum Tamers: Revealing Our Weird and Wired Future and animated short Roue.

== 2012 ==
The 2012 festival was held between February 29 and March 4 and honored documentarian Les Blank.

=== Awards ===
- Best of Fest
  - Ultrasonic (film)
- Best Feature
  - The Caretaker
- Best Documentary
  - Shining Night: A Portrait of Composer Morten Lauridsen
- Best Short (fiction)
  - Zombie Bohemia
- Best Experimental/Animation
  - Drained

== 2014 ==
The 2014 festival was held between February 19 and 23. DCIFF selected 62 films.

=== Awards ===
- Best of Fest
  - This Ain't No Mouse Music! directed by Chris Simon and Maureen Gosling
- Best Feature
  - Greencard Warriors directed by Miriam Kruishoop
- Best Documentary
  - Ofir directed by Mark McDannald
- Best International Film
  - 3 Mile Limit directed by Craig Newland
- Best of Metro DC
  - Blood and Circumstance directed by Tim Gordon
- Best Narrative Short
  - Halina directed by Francesco Ricci Lotteringi
- Best Animation
  - Virtuos Virtuell directed by Thomas Stellmach and Maja Oschmann

== 2018 ==
The 19th annual festival was held between February 14 and 19th, 2018 at the Burke and Carnegie Theaters in Washington DC.

=== Awards ===
- Best of Fest: This is Congo, directed by Daniel McCabe (USA / 2018 / 93mins)
- Best Feature: Closure, directed by Alex Goldberg (USA / 2017 / 90mins)
- Best Documentary: Generation Zapped, directed by Sabine El Gemayel, (USA / 2018 / 74mins)
- Best Documentary Short: Daddy, directed by John Gallen & Alex Faoro (USA / 2018 / 30mins)
- Best International Film: Little Fiel, directed by Irina Patkanian (Mozambique & USA / 2018 / 16 minutes)
- Best Animation: Negative Space, directed by Max Porter, Ru Kuwahata (France / 2017 / 5mins)
- Best Short (fiction): Moving Violation, directed by Laura Hinson (USA / 2017 / 13mins)
- Best of Metro DC: Change in the Family, directed by Sam Hampton, (USA / 2018 / 63mins)
- High School Film Awards
  - 1st Place: Invisible, directed by Matthew Gannon (USA / 2017 / 7mins)
  - 2nd place: Aftershock, directed by Ryan Beard, Ceci Becker, Alexander Gaither, Stephen Gentry (USA / 2017 / 9mins)
  - 3rd place: CREDIT 1, directed by David Murillo (Chile / 2017 / 4mins)

== 2019 ==
The 20th annual festival was held between March 1 and 10th, 2019 at the Miracle and Carnegie Theaters in Washington DC and included a retrospective of the work of Australian director Phillip Noyce.

=== Awards ===
- Best of Fest
  - Worlds of Ursula k. Le Guin directed by Arwen Curry (USA/2018/69 mins)
- Best Feature Film
  - Touched directed by Barak Barkan (USA/2019/80mins)
- Best International Film
  - Penguin Highway directed by Hiroyasu Ishida (Japan/2018/118 mins/Animation)
- Best Documentary
  - Wbcn and the American Revolution directed by bill Lichtenstein (USA/2019/125 mins)
- Best Metro DC Film
  - Dakota directed by Roberto Carmona (USA/2019/98 mins)
- Best Short Film – Fiction
  - The Scorpion's Tail directed by Jhosimar Vasquez (USA/2018/22.18 mins)
- Best Short Film – Documentary
  - 33: Local DC directed by David Ross, Lloyd foster, Kavon Martez (USA/2018/5.38 mins)
- Best Web Series Pilot
  - Vows directed by Ginny Leise (USA/2018/9.21mins)
- Best Animation
  - Alef B’tamuz directed by Yael Reisfeld (Israel/2018/5.58 mins)
- Best Film by a Woman Director Inaugural Award
  - Facing the dragon directed by Sedika Mojadidi (Afghanistan/2018/80 mins.)

High school film competition winners:

- 1st place : Finding home directed by Volanda Morrison (USA/2018/14 mins/documentary)
- 2nd place : I am not broken directed by Abrielle Yen Marsden (USA/2018/2.18 mins./animation)
- 3rd place : Blagden Alley nw directed by Nyrene Monteforte (USA/2018/9.13 mins/documentary)

== 2020 ==
The 21st annual festival was held between March 4–8, 2020 in Washington DC.

=== Awards ===
- Best Metro DC Film : The Imminent Expiration of Seth Dodson (USA/2019/11:36mins/fiction) directed by Alex Craig
- Best Narrative Short (fiction): Maradona's Legs (Germany/2019/20mins) directed by Firas Khoury
- Best Series Pilot/Episode: Good Genes (USA/2020/19mins) directed by Hannah Welever
- Best Documentary Short: Our Alexandria (USA/2019/17mins) directed by Robin Hamilton
- Best Documentary Feature Film: Medicating Normal (USA/2019/76mins) directed by Lynn Cunningham and Wendy Ractliffe
- Best Animated Short Film: Chapped (USA/2019/7.52 mins/stop-action animation) directed by Chelsea Rugg
- Best International Film:Sema (Speak Out) (Dem.Rep. of Congo/2019/45mins/feature) directed by Macherie Ekwa Bahango
- Best Feature Film: Love Type D (UK/2019/95mins) directed by Sasha Collington
- Best of Fest: Life In Synchro (USA/2020/53mins/documentary) directed by Angela Pinaglia

Best High School Films

- First Place: The Program (USA/2019/17 mins) directed by Autumn Morgan
- Second Place: Happy Pill (USA/2019/7:18mins) directed by Wyatt Richards
- Third Place: Static (USA/2019/4:45mins) directed by Jackson Little

== 2021 ==
The 22nd annual festival was DCIFF'S first ever hybrid festival held In March in Washington DC.

=== Awards ===
- Best of Fest: THE BEARS ON PINE RIDGE directed by Noel Bass
- Best Narrative Feature: JULIET MUST DIE directed by Marco Gadge
- Best Documentary: LEAVE THE DOOR OPEN directed by Umran Safter
- Best Narrative Short: #PRINCESSPROBLEMS directed by Maritza Gomez
- Best Animated Short Film: ALIEN NIGHTMARE directed by Lauriane Balestrat, Marc Antoine Alonzo, Alexis Sabalza, Elie Berhoumieux and Lucas Soupou
- Best International Film: THE SOUL OF A CYCLIST directed by Nuno Tavares
- Best DC Metro Film: THE LEGACY SESSIONS directed by William Ashton

High School Film Competition:

- 1st: Disowned directed by Andrew Stevens
- 2nd: Dare directed by Sebastian Plaza
- 3rd: Marked directed by Samantha Cohn and Madeline Simpson

== 2022 ==
The 23rd annual festival was held between March 2 and March 6 in Washington DC.

=== Awards ===
- Best of Fest: ADAM AND THE WATER directed by Matthew Appleby (USA/2022)
- Best Feature Film: AMERICANISH directed by Iman Zawahry (USA/2021)
- Best Documentary Feature: LIVING IN DELUSIONVILLE directed by Constant van Hoeven (USA/2022)
- Best International Film: MY CHILDHOOD, MY COUNTRY directed by Phil Grabsky and Shoaib Sharifi (UK/2021/documentary)
- Best Documentary Short: MY BROTHER IS DEAF directed by Peter Hoffman Kimball (USA/2021)
- Best Narrative Short: NORMALIZED directed by Ziad Foty (USA/2022)
- Best Animation (Short Form): ONE LAST DROP directed by Simon Schnellman (Switzerland/2021)
- Best of Metro DC: THE HIT directed by Chris Halsne (USA/2022)

== Press ==
- https://www.washingtonpost.com/express/2019/02/28/years-dc-independent-film-festival-has-been-anti-sundance-thats-how-they-like-it/
- https://www.theguardian.com/sport/2022/aug/23/the-hit-tony-stewarts-fatal-collision-with-kevin-ward-jr-still-lingers
- SoundCloud: https://soundcloud.com/user-55976759/32422-vets-for-peace-with-producer-phil-grabsky-on-his-new-award-winning-film
- Apple: https://podcasts.apple.com/us/podcast/veterans-for-peace-with-award-winning-producer-and/id1494039367?i=1000554992801
- Spotify: https://open.spotify.com/show/6HX8GEFgCoZHPiHnCtaaSU
