= Lars Windhorst =

German businessman (born 1976)

- Born: November 22, 1976 (age 49); Rahden, Germany
- Occupations: Executive Chairman and partner of the Sapinda Group, rebranded Tennor in 2019

Lars Windhorst (born November 22, 1976) is a German entrepreneur and co-founder of Sapinda Group. He is best known for being the owner of fashion company La Perla.

In 2015, he was ranked in the Sunday Times Rich List, with his net worth reported as being £320 million. He notably founded businesses in his teens, filing for bankruptcy in 2003 as a result of the Dot-com bubble. The following year, Windhorst co-founded the Sapinda Group. Following restructuring, Sapinda Holding BV, founded in 2009, is the group's parent company. Windhorst is its Non-Executive Chairman.

In December 2007, shortly after Christmas, Windhorst was severely injured during a plane crash in Kazakhstan. One of the pilots died when the Bombardier Challenger 604 hit a wall and exploded after leaving the runway in Almaty.

== Early life ==
At the age of 14, Windhorst, the son of a local stationery store owner, turned the family garage in his hometown of Rahden into a makeshift computer lab. He mobilised his classmates to help him build PCs, which he later sold in his father's shop, while seeking suppliers of individual components in China.

In 1993 while still at school, he established his first company. He was helped in administering its operations by his parents, given he was underage, such as by signing contracts on his behalf and driving him to work. Windhorst became well known as one of the most successful young entrepreneurs in Germany. Dubbed the "Wunderkind" and Germany's Bill Gates, he was invited to join the former German Chancellor Helmut Kohl on a trip to Asia as part of the official government delegation. It was on this trip that Windhorst developed international business contacts, being the youngest participant in the World Economic Forum in Davos.

== Early businesses ==
In October 1993, Windhorst founded his first company, Windhorst Electronics GmbH, alongside Chinese businessman Ming Rong Zhang. The activities of Windhorst Electronics GmbH initially focused on the import and trade of electronic components and computer parts from Asia as well as the sale of IT products throughout Germany and Europe. Just one year after the company was founded, Windhorst Electronics, with a total of 80 employees, reported a turnover of £80 million.

In 1995, Windhorst moved to Hong Kong and founded Windhorst Asia Pacific Holding Limited, a holding company for the business operations of the group in Asia. Until 1996, the Windhorst Group expanded its business as a trading and investment firm in the electronics, industry, trade, real estate and finance sectors. The company had offices and branches in Europe and Asia, including mainland China and Vietnam.

In 2000, Windhorst founded Windhorst New Technologies AG with a focus on investments in the internet and new technologies sectors. In 2002 Windhorst New Technologies AG was set to be listed on the Frankfurt Stock Exchange. However, with the onset of the economic crisis the group found itself in difficulties and had to subsequently declare bankruptcy in 2003.

=== Sapinda / Tennor Group ===
In 2004, Windhorst became co-founder of the Sapinda investment group, which coordinates financing with its affiliate, Anoa Capital, to provide funding to public, private and start-up companies. In approximately five years Sapinda processed investments to the value of more than €2 billion. During the 2008 financial crisis, the Group, and its German company Vatas Holding GmbH in particular, sustained considerable losses. As a result of the 2008 financial crisis, the company started restructuring talks; in January 2009 the partners had to file for bankruptcy for the German subsidiary Vatas.

In April 2009, all business activities were restructured and the new parent company for the group became Sapinda Holding BV, founded that same year in Amsterdam. The Group now has offices in several countries and employs a team of more than 80 employees worldwide. Sapinda Holding BV combines investments in agriculture and food processing with mining/raw materials, oil and gas extraction and production, in both public and private companies. It also holds stakes in the media, technology and real estate sectors. In February 2018 Sapinda acquired luxury brand La Perla.

Together with Carl Heinrich Bruhn, Lars Windhorst set up Amatheon Agri to give Sapinda Holding BV exposure to the African agricultural sector, according to German news magazine Der Spiegel. In an interview, Windhorst stated the Sapinda business organised investments amounting to around €3.5 billion between 2009 and 2012, including loans for companies like Air Berlin and Infineon. Sapinda's partners include management consultant Roland Berger, its advisory board being managed by Hubertus von Grünberg, who is also Chairman of Swedish-swiss corporation ABB Ltd.

In May, 2019, Sapinda Holding BV changed its name to Tennor (Tennor Holding B.V.).

== Lawsuits ==
Windhorst filed for personal bankruptcy in the summer of 2007. According to an article in German news magazine Focus from 3 September 2007, the lawsuit against him presented by his joint creditor, Ulrich Marseille, was rejected by the German Federal Court of Justice in August, meaning Windhorst's debts were cleared.

The Public Prosecutor in Berlin pressed charges against Windhorst for fraud, breach of trust, embezzlement and several counts of insolvency offences in 2009. Windhorst's breach of trust involved transferring €800,000 of personal funds into one of his alternative accounts. After a plea bargain, prosecutors agreed to drop the fraud charges if he paid a fine of €1 million, repaid €2.5 million to his alleged victim and admitted a breach of trust offence, for which he was given a one-year probation period. At proceedings commencing on 18 December 2009, these charges were discontinued, and the amount was paid back.

In 2010, Windhorst also faced a civil suit by Alki Partners, an American hedge fund, which filed papers in a Manhattan court alleging that he and others took part in a "fraudulent scheme" to "manipulate" the share price of Remote DX, a US company. The complaint was dismissed later that year.

== Philanthropy ==
Windhorst is a founding patron of the Serpentine Sackler Gallery and member of the Council of Trustees of the Serpentine Gallery in London. Since 2014, he has supported the C/O-Gallery in Berlin, a private museum specialising in photographic-art, acting as a "Patron".

Windhorst purchased part of the Christo and Jeanne-Claude collection, including documents and objects (such as scaffolding) involved in the 1995 Reichstag "wrapping". In November 2015, Norbert Lammert, President of the Bundestag, and the artist Christo opened an exhibition displaying 400 original drawings and sketches of the wrapping after Windhorst donated the works to the Bundestag until 2035.

From 2002 to 2012, Windhorst served as board of trustees of the Mentor Foundation, and collaborates with the Ein Herz für Kinder foundation.

== Hertha BSC ==
In June 2019, Windhorst bought stakes of Bundesliga side Hertha BSC. In all, Windhorst has invested €374mn in Hertha since 2019, but has since agreed to sell his 64.7 per cent stake. In September 2022 the Financial Times revealed that Windhorst had commissioned Israeli private intelligence company Shibumi Strategy to orchestrate a campaign against Hertha’s then-president Werner Gegenbauer.
