= Scagliotti =

Scagliotti is a surname. Notable people with the surname include:

- Allison Scagliotti (born 1990), American actress and director
- Cinzio Scagliotti (1911–1985), Italian professional football player and coach
- John Scagliotti, American film director and producer, and radio broadcaster
