= List of Israeli films of 2015 =

A list of films produced by the Israeli film industry released in 2015.

Premiere		Title	Director	Cast	Genre	Notes	Ref.
Jan	01	Invisibles	Mushon Salmona	Maisa Abd Elhadi, Ednan Abu Wadi, Bilal Alassad	Drama		
Jan	14	Why Hast Thou Forsaken Me	Hadar Morag	Muhammad Daas, Yuval Gurevich	Drama		
May	09	Matti Caspi: Confession	Dani Dotan, Dalia Mevorach	Matti Caspi, Riki Gal, Avirama Golan	Documentary		
Jun	01	Amok Bamaim	Irene Royo Shtayim	Shuky Barbash, Nurit Kacherginski Shtayim, Yuval Parnass-Mader	Drama, Short Film		
Jun	01	Borderline	Dima Konoplov	Ori Yaniv, Firas Suleiman Nassar, Igor Shneyderman	Drama, Comedy		
Jun	04	The Cantor and the Sea	Yehonatan Indursky	Yoav Hayt, Maayan Turjeman	Drama		
Jun	09	Ibiza	Shay Kanot	Shani Atias, Dvir Benedek, Maayan Blum	Comedy		
Jun	10	Tikkun	Avishai Sivan	Aharon Traitel, Khalifa Natour, Riki Blich	Drama		
Jul	10	Jeruzalem	Doron Paz, Yoav Paz	Yael Grobglas, Yon Tumarkin, Danielle Jadelyn	Horror	The directors are credited as The PAZ brothers	
Jul	15	Wedding Doll	Nitzan Giladi	Moran Rosenblatt, Assi Levy, Roy Assaf	Drama		
Aug	06	OMG, I'm a Robot!	Tal Goldberg, Gal Zelezniak	Yotam Ishay, Hili Yalon, Tzahi Grad	Comedy, Science Fiction		
Aug	06	What Could Possibly Go Wrong?	Ofir Lobel	Lior Duvdevani, Ilan Kovach, Rami Heuberger, Ofer Shechter, Guri Alfi	Comedy		
Sep	03	A Tale of Love and Darkness	Natalie Portman	Natalie Portman, Gilad Kahana, Amir Tessler	Biography, Drama, History		
Sep	09	Fire Birds	Amir Wolf	Gila Almagor, Rami Heuberger, Dvora Kedar	Thriller, Drama		
Sep	17	Demon	Marcin Wrona	Itay Tiran, Agnieszka Zulewska, Andrzej Grabowski	Drama, Fantasy, Horror	Film is Polish-Israeli	
Oct	01	Inertia	Idan Haguel	Mohammad Bakri, Ilanit Ben-Yaakov, Galia Ishai	Drama		
Oct	15	Freak Out	Boaz Armoni	Itay Zvolon, Kye Korabelnikov, Assaf Ben-Shimon	Comedy, Horror		
Oct	22	Wounded Land	Erez Tadmor	Maisa Abd Elhadi, Moshe Ashkenazi, Roy Assaf	Drama		
Oct	25	Bird in the Room	Ari Davidovich	Anael Blumenthal, Doron Tavory, Asnat Zibil	Documentary, Biography, History		
Nov	04	Rabin, the Last Day	Amos Gitai	Ischac Hiskiya, Yitzhak Hizkiya, Pini Mittelman	Thriller, Documentary, Drama		
Dec	03	Abulele	Jonathan Geva	Yoav Sadian, Idan Barkai, Bar Minali	Family, Fantasy, Adventure		
