= Rotem Sela =

Israeli model, actress, and television presenter (born 1983)

- רותם סלע
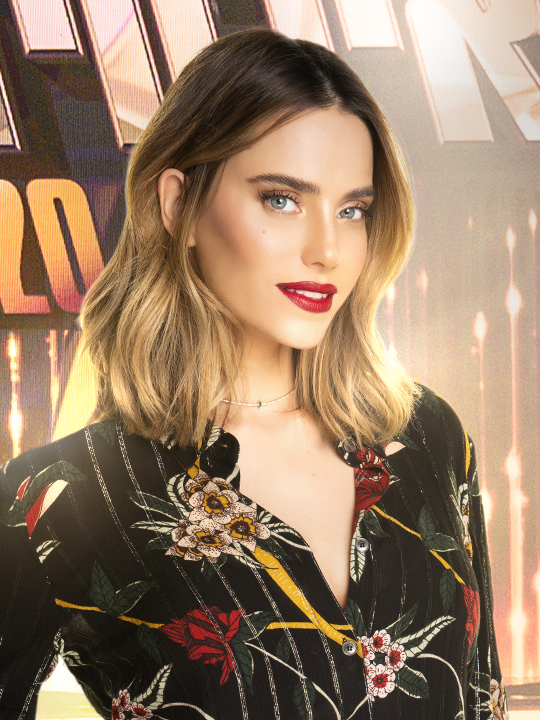
- Sela in 2019
- Born: Rotem Sela; 16 August 1983 (age 43); Kiryat Haim, Haifa, Israel
- Education: IDC Herzliya (LL.B. & B.A.)
- Occupations: Model; television host; actress
- Spouse: Ariel Rotter (m. 2010)
- Children: 3
- Modelling information
- Height: 1.72 m (5 ft 8 in)
- Hair colour: Dark blonde
- Eye colour: Blue
- Agency: Roberto Models Agency (Tel Aviv)

Rotem Sela (Hebrew: רותם סלע-רוטר; born 16 August 1983) is an Israeli model, television presenter, and actress who starred as Noa Hollander on the Israeli television series Beauty and the Baker (2013–2021) and has co-hosted the singing reality show Rising Star since 2014. In 2022, she was described by Haaretz as "the most successful actress in Israel right now."

In 2023, she began starring in A Body That Works, Israel's highest-rated drama of that year. She won Best Actress at Series Mania for her role and was also a Best Actress nominee for the Awards of the Israeli Television Academy. In 2026, she was awarded the Best Supporting Actress in a Comedy award at the Awards of the Israeli Television Academy for her role in the second season of Bloody Murray (2022–present).

== Early life ==
Sela was born and raised in Kiryat Haim, Haifa, to Liora (Shaulski), a teacher and Avraham, a CEO of a medical equipment company. She is of Polish-Jewish and Turkish-Jewish descent. Her family moved to Caesarea when she was 17.

She served in the Israel Defense Forces for three years as a clerk in the Israeli Navy.

She graduated in 2011 with a degree in law and business administration from the Interdisciplinary Center Herzliya (now Reichman University), and subsequently passed the bar.

== Career ==
Sela has expressed a preference for pursuing her career in Israel rather than abroad, stating: “Tel Aviv cannot be replaced by any city in the world. It’s always surprising to people, but it’s really not my dream to succeed in America, I want to succeed here, to work here, to do Israeli work … it was important to me to stay here.”

Sela began her modelling career at the age of 15, when she was signed by modelling agent Roberto Ben Shoshan.

In 2013 she was cast as the female lead in Beauty and the Baker alongside Aviv Alush after Bar Refaeli exited the role. Sela played Noa Hollander, a privileged Ashkenazi model and heiress who falls in love with a working-class Yemenite baker, Amos Dahari (Alush). The series was positively reviewed by the newspaper Haaretz. In 2017, Amazon acquired global rights to the first two seasons of the show to stream them worldwide on Amazon Prime Video.

In 2018 she was cast as a series regular in The Psychologist, an Israeli Public Broadcasting Corporation show that follows a similar format to the Lisa Kudrow series Web Therapy. In the same year Sela appeared alongside Assi Cohen as a Haredi housewife in Autonomies. Autonomies is a dystopian drama about an Israel divided into two entities; the Haredi Autonomy in Jerusalem and a secular State of Israel in Tel Aviv.

In 2023 she starred alongside Yehuda Levi in A Body That Works, a surrogacy drama series on Keshet 12. It was the highest-rated drama of 2023 in Israel. Sela won the Best Actress award for an international series at Series Mania in France. It was released internationally by Netflix.

In January 2025, Sela starred alongside Lior Raz and Zohar Strauss in the Israeli drama, Soda by Erez Tadmor. It is based on the story of Tadmor's grandfather, a Jewish partisan during the Second World War, and his subsequent post-war life in Israel. The film centers on an accusation that Sela's character on the Kibbutz was a Kapo during the Holocaust.

In 2025, Sela and Lior Raz co-created and took part in Off Road, a Netflix documentary-reality series following the two on a journey through Central Asia, produced with Keshet International. Maariv reported that it was the most-watched show in Israel in the two weeks after its release.

In the same year she starred in Red Alert, a drama series based upon real life events from the October 7 attacks. The limited series was produced by American producer Lawrence Bender and was scheduled to be released internationally by Paramount+ and on Channel 12 in Israel on October 7, 2025.

=== Additional work ===
As a model, she has fronted campaigns for the fashion brand Castro alongside Alush.

In 2025, she was briefly featured on Idan Amedi's sixth studio album, Superman, with a spoken part.

In 2026, Sela co-founded the dietary supplement brand Better with Yehonatan Gal, CEO of Kamipel Brands.

== Personal life ==
In 2010, she married Israeli businessman Ariel Rotter, with whom she has three children.

Sela became a vegetarian in 2007, and then began to take on veganism as well. In an interview with Pnai Plus in December 2015, she defined herself as "90% vegan". In 2014, she participated in a broadcast by the Vegan Friendly organization, which opposes the harm to cows in the dairy industry and calls for avoiding the consumption of dairy products.

In March 2019, Sela criticized Israel's Ministry of Culture and Sport, Mrs. Miri Regev, due to Regev's reaction to the Arab political parties at the Knesset of Israel. Sela subsequently shared her political views online, where she also criticized Israeli Prime Minister Benjamin Netanyahu; Netanyahu responded directly back to Sela's post, and brought to her attention the Basic Law: Israel as the Nation-State of the Jewish People. Sela was publicly supported at the time by several local figures, including her fellow Israeli actress Gal Gadot, model Shlomit Malka, and Arab-Israeli newscaster Lucy Aharish.

Sela has supported LGBT rights, telling ynet in 2015 that "I would give Nora Grinberg a torch, she's among the first [openly] transgender people in Israel, and it's very important that gays, lesbians and transgenders get a stage." And when asked whether the #MeToo movement had become too extreme, she replied, "The situation before the #MeToo movement was extreme, this world in which men allowed themselves to talk and behave to women in an uninhibited way. The campaign is very important, and even if at the moment it feels to some people too extreme, it is okay and eventually the middle will be found."

== Filmography ==
Year	Title	Role	Notes
2003	Shemesh	Model	Episode: Basad Ha-Sheni
2007	HaAlufa		Episode 2.99
2009–2011	Naor's Friends	Rotem Sela	Episodes: Passive Aggressive, Missoni Shirt
2010	Bobby ve Ani	Nurse Svetlana	
2010	Lost in Africa	Tzlil Marom Meitar	Mini-series
2011	Eretz Nehederet	Not Really Rotem Sela	Episode: 8.7
2013–2021	Beauty and the Baker	Noa Hollander	Series regular
2014–present	Rising Star	Co-host	With Assi Azar
2017	The Dogs		Short film
2018	The Psychologist	Liat Shtrosman	Series regular
2018	Autonomies	Blumi	Miniseries
2020–2021	The Chef	Osnat	9 episodes
2021	Jerusalem	Shira	Mini series
2022	Ole LaRosh		Film
2022–present	Bloody Murray	Dana	Series regular
2023–present	A Body That Works	Elie Avrahami	Series regular
2024–present	Metukim	Shunit Devash	Series regular
2025	Soda	Ewa	Film
2025	Red Alert	Bat Sheva	Limited series
2025	Off Road	Herself	Documentary series; also co-creator

== See also ==
- Israeli fashion
- Women of Israel
- Women in the Israel Defense Forces
- List of Israelis
- List of Jewish actors
