= Lior Raz =

Israeli actor and screenwriter (born 1971)

- ליאור רז
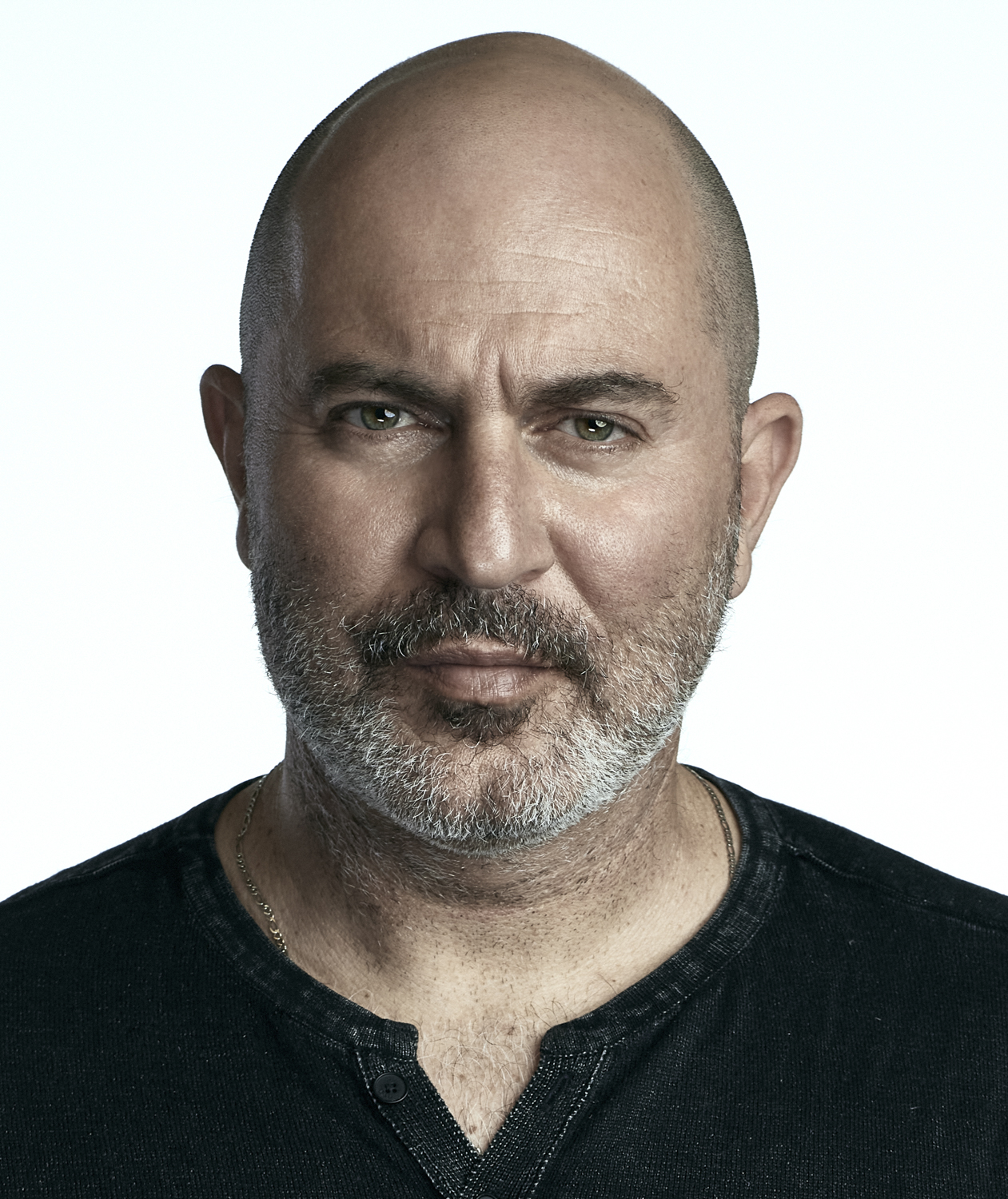
- Raz in 2021
- Born: 24 November 1971 (age 54); Jerusalem, Israel
- Occupations: Actor and screenwriter
- Years active: 2000–present
- Known for: Fauda
- Spouse: Meital Berdah
- Children: 4

Lior Raz (Hebrew: ליאור רז; born 24 November 1971) is an Israeli actor and screenwriter, best known for co-creating and starring as Doron Kabilio in the political thriller television series Fauda. He also headlined the 2021 series Hit & Run and, in 2025, starred in the unscripted Netflix travel documentary Off Road alongside Rotem Sela.

== Early life ==
Raz grew up in Ma'ale Adumim, an Israeli settlement in the West Bank outside Jerusalem. His Mizrahi Jewish parents fled to Israel from Iraq and Algeria. His father served in Israel in Shayetet 13 and in Shin Bet before later running a plant nursery. His mother is a teacher. Raised speaking Arabic at home with his father and grandmother, he spoke the language with Palestinian workers who played with him at his father’s nursery.

After Raz graduated from high school at the age of 18, he enlisted in the Israel Defense Forces and became a commando in the elite undercover counter-terrorism unit known as Sayeret Duvdevan. He also served in the Duvdevan reserves for 20 years.

When Raz was 19, his girlfriend of three years, Iris Azulai, was murdered in a 1990 stabbing attack in Jerusalem. The Palestinian who killed her was later released from prison in the 2011 Gilad Shalit prisoner exchange.

In 1993, after his military service, Raz moved to the United States, and was hired by a security contracting firm as Arnold Schwarzenegger's bodyguard. In an interview with Israel Hayom he said: “the company turned to me since they knew my military background, for me it was the most glamorous thing, to be the watchdog of Schwarzenegger and his wife".

== Career ==
When Raz returned to Israel at age 24, he studied at Nissan Nativ Drama School in Tel Aviv.

In his early acting years, Raz acted in various plays, such as Don Juan at Gesher Theater, Macbeth and The Teenagers. He also played small roles on Israeli TV series. In 2004, he played a police investigator in Michaela, and 'referee Ben Shabat' in Adumot. In 2005 he appeared as Shimi in his first feature film Gotta Be Happy. In 2008 he appeared in television drama Srugim as Yisrael, and a year later in comedy-drama Mesudarim as a Shin Bet agent, and as Maor in Noah's Ark. In 2011 he played a police unit commander in Nadav Lapid's drama film Policeman, and as Asa'el in the political drama Prime Minister's Children alongside Rami Heuberger.

In 2012, Raz portrayed Nissan Title in yes psychological thriller spying-drama The Gordin Cell, and appeared in the film The World is Funny as Barak. In 2013, he played the role of the police commander in the fourth season of the crime drama series The Arbitrator, and in 2014 appeared in the film The Kindergarten Teacher.

In 2014, he created with Haaretz journalist Avi Issacharoff the critically acclaimed political thriller television series Fauda, in which Raz stars as Doron Kabilio, the commander of an undercover counter-terrorism Mista'arvim unit. In 2016, the show won six awards, including Best Drama Series, at the Israeli Academy Awards. In December 2017, The New York Times voted Fauda the best international show of 2017. In 2018, the show won 11 Israeli TV Academy Awards, including best TV drama, best actor for Raz, and best screenplay, casting, cinematography, recording, and special effects.

In 2018, Raz played a Magdala community leader in the film Mary Magdalene, written by Helen Edmundson. The same year, he appeared in Operation Finale, playing Isser Harel, the Director of the Mossad (Israel's intelligence agency).

In August 2021, Netflix released a new series named Hit & Run which stars Raz. The show was co-created by Raz, Avi Issacharoff, Dawn Prestwich and Nicole Yorkin.

Fauda production company, Faraway Road Productions, was also co-founded by Raz and Issacharoff, then, in 2022, was acquired by Candle Media, with continued involvement from both partners.

In 2023, he and Fauda co-creator Avi Issacharoff created Ghosts of Beirut, a four-part spy drama that revisits the true-life manhunt for Imad Mughniyeh, which streamed on Showtime starting 19 May and made its on-air debut on 21 May.

In the same year he began starring alongside Rotem Sela and Yehuda Levi in A Body That Works, a surrogacy drama series on Keshet 12. The series was a major success in Israel, and was the highest rated drama of 2023 in the country. It was released internationally by Netflix.

In 2024, he played Viggo in Gladiator II. In January 2025, he starred alongside Sela and Zohar Strauss in Erez Tadmor's drama film Soda, based on the story of Tadmor's grandfather, a Jewish partisan during the Second World War, and his post-war life in Israel.

== Personal life ==
Raz is married to Israeli actress Meital Berdah, and they have four children. They reside in Ramat Hasharon, Israel.

== Filmography ==
=== Film ===
| Year | Title | Role | Notes |
|---|---|---|---|
| 2000 | Delta Force One: The Lost Patrol | Cave Guard | |
| 2005 | Muchrachim Lehiyot Same'ach | Shimi | |
| 2008 | Everything Starts at the Sea | Officer | |
| 2008 | Eli & Ben | Undercover policeman | |
| 2010 | Mabul | Rafi | |
| 2011 | Policeman | | |
| 2012 | Haolam Mats'hik | Barak | |
| 2014 | The Kindergarten Teacher | Nira's husband | |
| 2018 | Mary Magdalene | Magdala Community Leader | |
| 2018 | Operation Finale | Isser Harel | |
| 2018 | Hollywood Salutes Israel | Himself | |
| 2019 | 6 Underground | Rovach Alimov | |
| 2020 | Dena Gildens Life | Levi Cohan | |
| 2024 | Gladiator II | Viggo | |
| 2025 | Soda | Shalom Gottlieb | |
| 2025 | Tuner | Uri | |

=== Television ===
| Year | Title | Role | Notes |
|---|---|---|---|
| 2011–2012 | Prime Minister's Children | Asael | 18 episodes |
| 2013 | Scarred | Shmulik | 16 episodes |
| 2015–present | Fauda | Doron Kabilio | 48 episodes |
| 2016–2017 | Dumb | Amos | 4 episodes |
| 2021 | Hit & Run | Segev Azulai | 10 episodes |
| 2023 | The Crowded Room | Yitzak Safdie | 10 episodes |
| 2023 | A Body That Works | Tomer | 9 episodes |
| 2025 | Off Road | Himself | 6 episodes; also co-creator |
