= Nurit Galron =

Israeli singer (born 1951)

Nurit Galron נורית גלרון
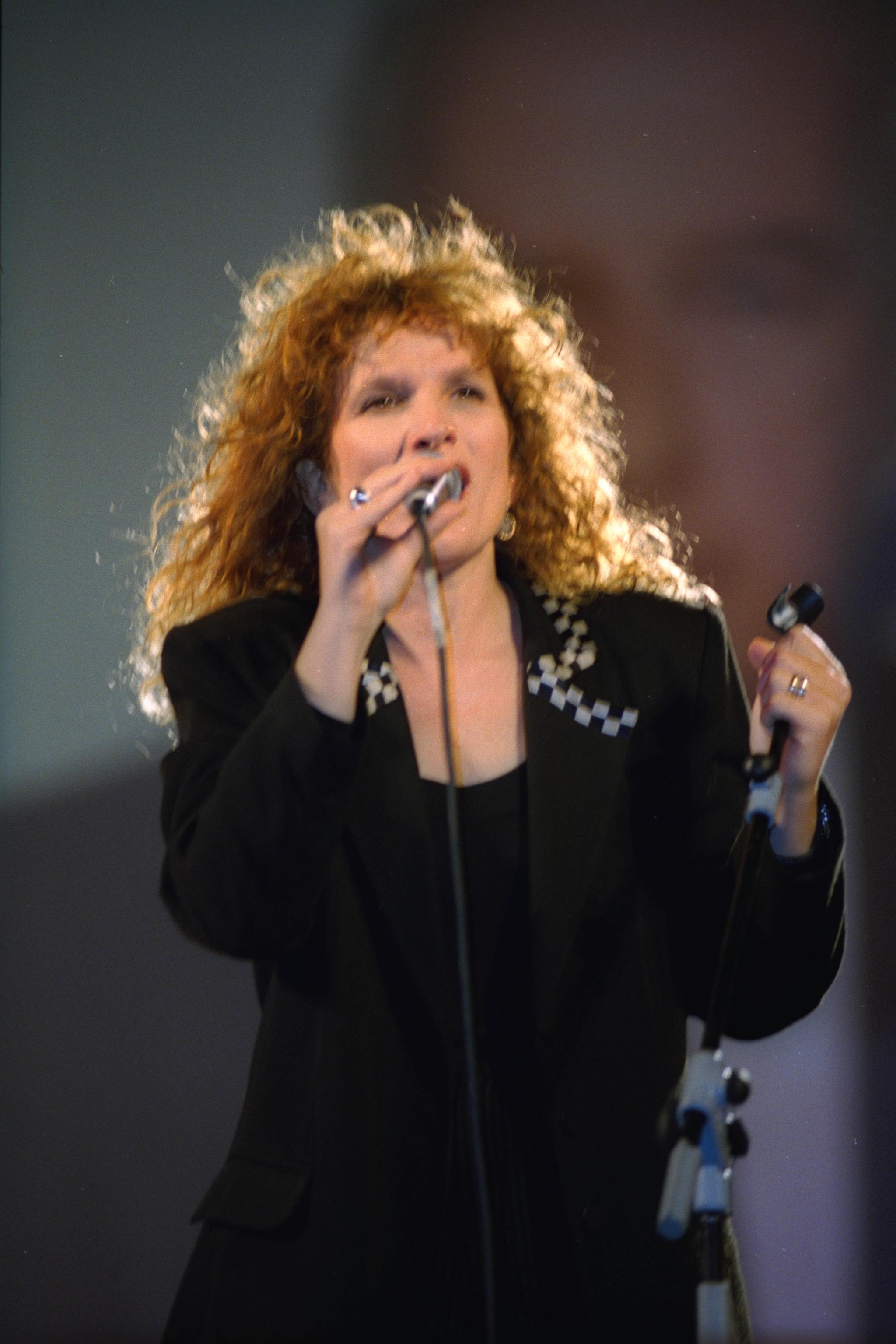
- Nurit Galron performing at a memorial service for PM Yitzhak Rabin

Background information
- Born: 21 March 1951 (age 75)
- Origin: Israel
- Occupation: Singer
- Instrument: Vocals
- Spouse: Rafi Reshef
- Parents: Moshe Klimburd (father); Leah Sitin (mother)

Nurit Galron (Hebrew: נורית גלרון Hebrew pronunciation: [nuˈʁit galˈʁon], born 21 March 1951) is an Israeli singer, lyricist, and actress.

== Biography ==
=== Early life ===
Nurit Galron was born as Nurit Klimburd. Her mother, Leah Sitin, retired from the stage after singing with the Jewish Brigade band "Ma'ayan Zahav," founded by director Eliyahu Goldinberg. Her father, Moshe, was a cashier who had been a soldier in Anders' Army, and following the murder of his wife and child in the Holocaust, left the army and immigrated to the Land of Israel. She grew up in the Neve Amal neighborhood in Herzliya. She was a member of HaMahanot HaOlim youth movement.

=== Early career ===
Galron began her professional path in 1970 in the Israel Defense Forces, in Golani Brigade Entertainment Troupe (Tzevet Havai Golani), where she performed her first solo, "Haloch Va'khatof." After her military service, she studied film and theater at Tel Aviv University and performed in small jazz clubs. She adopted the surname "Galron."

In late 1978, she released her first solo album, Nurit Galron (nicknamed "The Purple Album"), which garnered high praise. The album featured songs that became Israeli staples, including "Kim'at" (Almost), "Shalekhet" (Autumn, a rendition of a song her mother sang in the Jewish Brigade Band), "Ahuvati Sheli L'vanat Tzavar" (My White-Necked Love), and "Ulay Machar" (Maybe Tomorrow).

Her second album, Nurit Galron Live (1979), was a live jazz recording.

=== 1980s–1990s ===
In 1981, she released the highly successful album Shirim Be'emtza Ha'laila (Songs in the Middle of the Night), entirely dedicated to the poems of Nathan Zach. The album yielded the songs: "Ki Ha'Adam Etz Ha'sadeh" (For Man is the Tree of the Field), "Kulanu Zkukim Le'khesed" (We All Need Kindness), and "K'she'tziltzalt Ra'ad Kolech" (When You Called, Your Voice Trembled).

Throughout the 1980s, she released other albums, including: Simpatya (1982), Ani Ra'iti Yofi (1983, which included "Atzei Ha'te'ena"), and Negi'a Achat Raka (One Soft Touch, 1984), which featured the title track (lyrics by Ali Mohar) and "L'vad Ba'carnival" (Alone at the Holidays).

In the album Achareinu Ha'mabul (After Us the Deluge, 1989), she first expressed her socio-political views in the title track, which addressed public indifference regarding the First Intifada. The song was banned from airplay by the Israel Broadcasting Authority, sparking a public debate on freedom of expression.

In the 1990s, she began collaborating with younger rock artists, including Aviv Geffen (who wrote "Ata Po Chaser Li" in the 1992 album B'toch Ha's'arot), Arkadi Duchin, and Ben Artzi.

In 1995, she recorded the album Klassi (Classical) in collaboration with the Raanana Symphonette Orchestra.

=== 2000s ===
Her album Lehitra'ot Matok (Goodbye Sweetheart, 2000) featured the tracks "Ata Holech Lishon Mukdam" and the title song, both composed by Leah Shabbat.

In the 2010s, she released another album of Nathan Zach songs, Ve'az Ba Lanu (2010). She continues to perform and record, including collaborations with artists like Ilai Botner, and has acted in TV series such as Ran Quartet (2008) and A Body That Works (2023).

== Personal life ==
She is married to Israeli TV and radio journalist Rafi Reshef.

== Discography ==
1. What the Heavens Give (2006)
2. Greatest Hits (2005)
3. Goodbye Honey (2000)
4. That Place (1996)
5. Classic (1995)
6. Within The Storms (1992)
7. Après Nous Le Déluge (1989)
8. Soul Bird (1988)
9. Hearfelt (1986)
10. A Gentle Touch (1984)
11. Sympathy (1982)
12. I Saw Beauty (1982)
13. Songs in the Middle of the Night (1981)
14. Nurit Galron (1978)
