= Wounded Land =

Wounded Land may refer to:

- Wounded Land (film), a 2015 Israeli drama film
- Wounded Land (album), a 1993 album by Threshold
- The Wounded Land, a fantasy novel by Stephen R. Donaldson
- The Wounded Land: Journey Through a Divided America, a 1964 book by Hans Habe
