= Danielle Jadelyn =

Israeli-British actress and filmmaker

Danielle Jadelyn (Hebrew: דניאל ג'יידלין) is an Israeli-British actress and filmmaker.

== Early life ==
Jadelyn was born in 1983 and grew up in Israel. She graduated from Arts Educational School London in 2006.

== Career ==
In 2007, Jadelyn had a recurring role in the first season of the British TV show Skins as Katie, the Water Bottle Girl.

In 2011, she played Yulia in Israeli drama series The Prime Minister's Children of HOT tv.

In 2012, Jadelyn played "hostel girl" in the Russian film Dirizhyor (2012) and various other independent films.

In 2015, Jadelyn starred along Yael Grobglas and Yon Tumarkin in JeruZalem, an English-speaking Israeli horror film.

== Filmmaking ==
In 2007, Jadelyn and her partner Steven Hilder created Jadelyn-Hilder Productions. In addition to various short films, they made a 40 minute film named The Ending which Jadelyn wrote and directed.

In 2013, Jadelyn wrote and appeared in a short independent film titled Bunny Love, with Israeli director Veronica Kedar. It was sent to various festivals.

In 2014, she directed the film Folie à Trois (Hebrew: טירוף כפול שלוש) which was shown at the Israeli Utopia film-festival.

== Filmography ==
=== Actress ===
==== Film ====
Year	Title	Role	Notes
2011	Morning Ms. Meth	Meth Addict	Short
2012	Dirizhyor	Hostel girl	Russian film
2012	Bunny Love	Kitty	Short
2013	Awake	Shahar	Short
2014	Field Poppy	Meth Addict	Short
2016	JeruZalem	Sarah Pullman	Main role, English-speaking Israeli film
2016	Second Life	Ariel	Short
2016	No Bloode	Adi	Israeli film

==== Television ====
Year	Title	Role	Notes
2007	Skins	Katie the Water Bottle Girl	British TV series: Cassie & Finale
2011	Prime Minister's Children (Yaldey Rosh Ha-Memshala)	Yulia	Israeli TV series, series regular

== Production ==
=== Filmmaking ===
Year	Title	Type	Notes
2012	Bunny Love	Writer	Short film
2013	Folie à Trois	Writer, Co-Producer, Director, Editor	
