= The Assassin Next Door =

- Hebrew: קירות
- Directed by: Danny Lerner
- Written by: Danny Lerner
- Produced by: Edouard Douek; Ehud Bleiberg; Yoav Ze'evi
- Starring: Olga Kurylenko; Ninette Tayeb; Vladimir Friedman; Shalom Micahelashvili; Liron Levo; Zohar Shtrauss; Jana Gore; Raymond Amsalem; Hanry David; Ester Rada
- Cinematography: Ram Shweky
- Edited by: Tal Keller; Yves Beloniak
- Music by: Nathaniel Méchaly
- Release date: September 13, 2009 (TIFF)
- Running time: 103 minutes
- Countries: Israel; France; United States
- Languages: English, Hebrew, Russian
- Budget: $3.0 million

The Assassin Next Door (Hebrew: קירות, romanized: Kirot; lit. 'Walls') is an English-language Israeli action drama film directed by Danny Lerner in 2009. The primary language is English with many scenes in Russian and Hebrew with English subtitles.

== Plot ==
Galia is a Ukrainian sex slave working in Tel Aviv who attempts to escape with another woman. They are captured and beaten and she watches her friend stabbed to death. She demands to be released and a Russian mobster feels she is smart and strong enough to fill another role. She is told to assassinate a man in a coffee shop and is successful. She is then given an apartment and a pittance.

She performs intermittent assassinations while trying to earn money and to have her passport returned to her so she can return to Ukraine and re-unite with her daughter. She is troubled, though, by the noise of her neighbor constantly beating his wife Elinor. She reaches out to her neighbor and offers friendship, as she can relate to her situation having formerly also been a battered wife.

Galia and Elinor develop a very affectionate friendship. Galia performs her last hit but then the Russian mafia turns on her and attempts to kill her. She then robs the mafia of the money she is owed and attempts to get Elinor to run away with her. At first she is not successful until Elinor stabs her husband when he is beating her and she is now pregnant. As they run away together they are pursued by the mafia in a series of bloody shootouts.

== Cast ==
- Olga Kurylenko - Galia
- Ninet Tayeb - Eleanor
- Vladimir Friedman - Mishka
- Liron Levo - Roni
- Shalom Micahelashvili - Michael
- Zohar Strauss - Eleanor's violent husband
- Jana Gore - Nina
- Hanry David - Peter
- Roy Assaf - Shay
- Raymond Amsalem - Blanit
- Ester Rada - Barbie

== Reception ==
Hanna Brown of The Jerusalem Post gave it 4 stars, and wrote: "Rarely have I seen a film as brilliant, and as frustrating, as Danny Lerner's Walls." Brown praised the style of the film and Kurylenko's performance, but criticized the tone and said that the "violence threatens to derail the entire film at times."
