= Eyes Wide Open (film) =

- Theatrical release poster
- עיניים פקוחות
- Directed by: Haim Tabakman
- Written by: Merav Doster
- Produced by: Raphael Katz
- Starring: Ran Danker; Zohar Strauss
- Cinematography: Axel Schneppat
- Edited by: Dov Steuer
- Music by: Nathaniel Méchaly
- Distributed by: Peccadillo Pictures
- Release dates: May 20, 2009 (Cannes); September 3, 2009 (Israel)
- Running time: 91 minutes
- Country: Israel
- Language: Hebrew
- Box office: $276,576

Eyes Wide Open (Hebrew: עיניים פקוחות, translit. Einayim Pkuhot) is a 2009 Israeli film. This script was written by the Israeli script-writer Merav Doster. It is the first film of the Israeli film director Haim Tabakman. The film was released in the UK on May 14, 2009, by Peccadillo Pictures The film was co-produced in Israel, France and Germany.

== Plot ==
Aaron (Zohar Strauss), a married Orthodox Jewish father of four living in Jerusalem, takes over his family's butcher shop after the recent death of his father. Ezri (Ran Danker), a nineteen-year-old homeless Yeshiva student from Safed who has just arrived in Jerusalem, visits the shop to use the telephone. After turning down Ezri's offer to help around the shop, he later finds Ezri asleep in the local synagogue and offers him space to stay at the shop. Aaron takes Ezri on as an apprentice and encourages his religious studies. Aaron offers Ezri a spare/store room upstairs in the shop. Later that day, while coming upstairs to see Ezri, Aaron finds a folder with some drawings made by his apprentice and seems surprised. He then expresses his admiration for Ezri's talent for drawing.

The two men become close after Ezri invites Aaron to take a ritual bath in the outskirts of the city. Rivka, Aaron's devoted wife, initially welcomes her husband's apprentice into their family circle. One evening after Aaron asks Ezri to draw his portrait, Ezri makes a sexual advance, which Aaron rebuffs. Later, however, they kiss and begin a sexual relationship. Rivka becomes suspicious when her husband begins to arrive home late and is no longer interested in having sex with her. Rabbi Vaisben, a family friend, warns Aaron against associating too closely with Ezri, reporting that he was expelled from his local Safed yeshiva (rabbinic school), but Aaron defends him. Being a devout religious man, living in Mea Shearim, a Haredi community, Aaron is torn between his family and devotion to God, and the intense feelings he has for Ezri.

Aaron is repeatedly told that Ezri is a bad influence and perhaps even cursed; local people start warning Ezri to stay away from them. Flyers begin to circulate in the neighborhood, denouncing Ezri's deeds in Safed (later on in the film it becomes clear that Ezri's ex-boyfriend Ephraim is involved) prompting many to boycott the butcher's shop. Under increasing social, economic and family pressure, Aaron tries to break off ties with Ezri but is unable to bring himself to do so. Confronted by Rabbi Vaisben, Aaron is unabashed, feeling alive only now. Ezri encounters his former lover outside the synagogue, in the attempt to confront him about the flyers, which escalates into Ezri being attacked by some locals. Aaron witnesses the attack but does not intervene. He consoles Ezri afterwards, but they both realize it is time for Ezri to leave the community. Aaron continues to be distressed by this, asking for Rivka's understanding and protection. He returns early one morning to the spot where he took a bath with Ezri. He submerges himself beneath the water for a prolonged period before the camera fades to black. Merav Doster, the screenplayer, has said that the final scene should not be understood as a drowning, as Aaron can emerge. But the director wished to leave the end uncertain.

== Cast ==
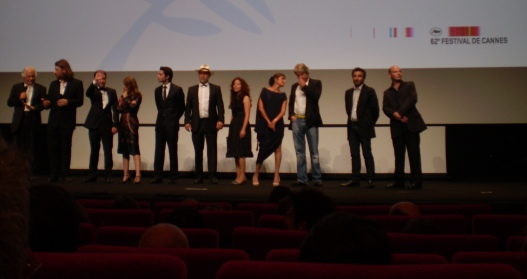
Presentation of the film at Cannes Film Festival 2009

- Ran Danker as Ezri
- Zohar Strauss as Aaron Fleischman
- Ravit Rozen a.k.a. Tinkerbell as Rivka Fleischman
- Tzahi Grad as Rabbi Vaisben
- Avi Grayinik as Israel Fisher
- Eva Zrihen-Attali as Sara
- Mati Atlas as Ephraim

== Awards ==
Eyes Wide Open competed in the official selection of the 2009 Cannes Film Festival in the category "Un Certain Regard".

The film won the Grand Prix for Best Film at Film Fest Gent in 2009.

== Critical reception ==
The film received positive reviews from critics. Review aggregator Rotten Tomatoes reports that 86% out of 35 professional critics gave the film a positive review, with a rating average of 6.9/10. A. O. Scott from The New York Times wrote in a positive review that the film "moves slowly and patiently through the ordeal of a single soul, illuminating in the process a cosmos of intense and hidden feeling."
