= Tarzan and Jane (musical) =

Tarzan and Jane - The Musical is an Israeli musical that generally follows the plot described in the Edgar Rice Burroughs' novel Tarzan. The musical was presented in theaters across the country in 2004.

The children's play was produced by Tamir Productions (טמיר הפקות), directed by Hanoch Rosen, written by Efraim Sidon, costumed by These Kolesnik, was performed in the Hebrew language, and ran for 62 minutes.

This is one of four musicals by Tamir Productions, along with Speed and Magic Wheels, Peter Pan, the award-winning The Jungle Book (Hebrew Wikipedia article).

== Production ==
In December 2004, the musical was performed 50 times in huge halls to nearly 100 000 spectators. Public demand during the year resulted in 100 performances being added.

The musical was released on DVD.

== Plot ==
The story of "Tarzan" follows the adventures of an orphan baby, adopted by a family of gorillas and ultimately accepted as one of their own. Tarzan grows and becomes a young man with the instincts of a brute force and athletic star. His life changes forever when he meets people, he makes contact with them and feel them immediate proximity inexplicable. Tarzan tries to find his place between the "two worlds": the animals who raised him and the human family to which it belongs by virtue of being human.

== Music ==
Rhythmic songs, accompany the narrative, the ability to represent the movement of the musical group Tararam.

=== List of songs ===
The track list is below. A soundtrack was released.

1. Fun to be a Gorilla (כיף להיות גורילה )
2. The Three of us Together (שלושתנו ביחד)
3. Tarzan in the Trees (טרזן על העצים)
4. I am in the Jungle (אני בג'ונגל)
5. I am Tarzan, you are Jane אני טרזן ואת ג'יין
6. Love Song (שיר אהבה)
7. The Wild Song (שיר הפראים)
8. Monkey Monkey (קוף קוף)
9. Still Together (בכל זאת ביחד)
10. Mega Mix (מגה מיקס)

== Original cast (2004) ==
- Tarzan – Yehuda Levi
- Jane – Yael Bar Zohar
- Cheetah the chimp – Tal Mosseri
- Jane's father – Israel Gurion
- Clayton – Yossi Toledo

== Tour cast (2005) ==
- Tarzan – Guy Arieli
- Jane – Yael Duani

== Critical reception ==
YNet wrote "Tarzan and Jane is a great show with a real plot. That old genre, in which players move really talented and beautiful and speak diction can understand it."
