= Off Road (TV series) =

- Hebrew: אופרוד
- Starring: Lior Raz; Rotem Sela
- Country of origin: Israel
- No. of episodes: 6

Production
- Production company: Faraway Road Productions; Keshet International

Original release
- Network: Netflix
- Release: 10 July 2025

Off Road (Hebrew: אופרוד) is an Israeli television travel documentary.

== Narrative ==
Actors Lior Raz and Rotem Sela travel together through Central Asia (Kazakhstan and Kyrgyzstan). While traveling on this journey together, the two talk about their lives and their struggles.

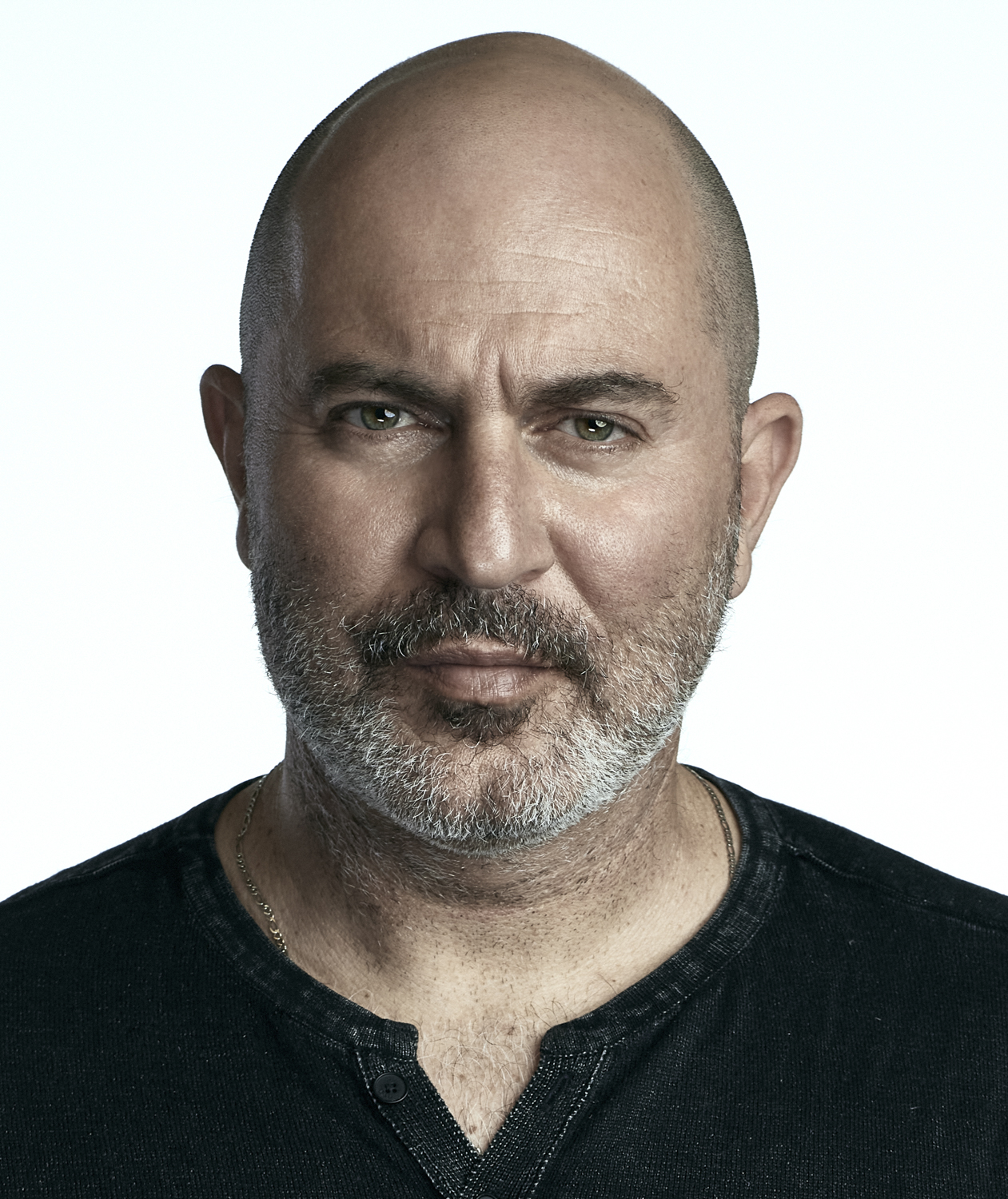
Lior Raz

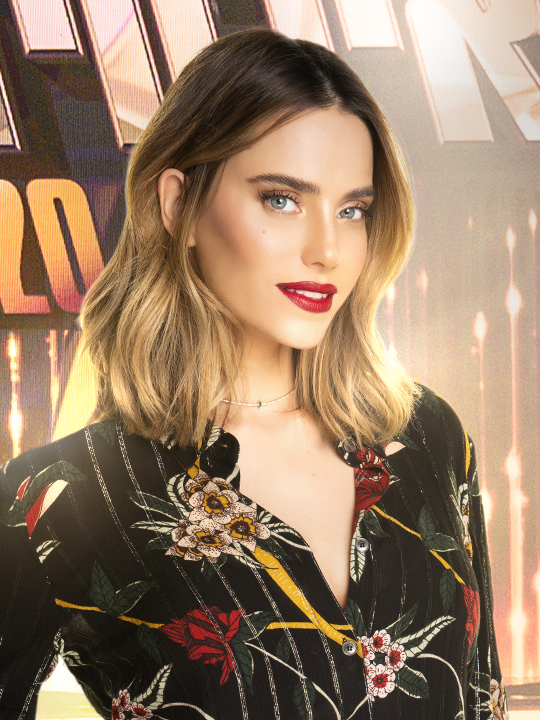
Rotem Sela

== Production ==
Off Road premiered on Netflix on 10 July 2025.

== Reception ==
Writing for the Decider, Joel Keller praised the series' cinematography for capturing the landscapes of Kyrgyzstan.

Haaretz's Itay Ziv found the series 'difficult to watch' and largely banal.
