= Soda (film) =

- Hebrew: סודה
- Directed by: Erez Tadmor
- Written by: Shlomo Efrati; Erez Tadmor
- Produced by: Moshe Edery; Shalom Eisenbach; Shemi Shoenfeld
- Starring: Rotem Sela; Lior Raz; Zohar Strauss
- Cinematography: Boaz Yehonatan Yaacov
- Edited by: Einat Glaser-Zarhin
- Music by: Frank Ilfman
- Production companies: United King Films; Comeback Films
- Distributed by: United King Films
- Release dates: June 5, 2024 (Israeli Cinema Day); January 16, 2025 (Israel)
- Running time: 96 minutes
- Country: Israel
- Language: Hebrew

Soda (Hebrew: סודה is a 2024 Israeli drama film directed by Erez Tadmor. The film stars Rotem Sela, Lior Raz and Zohar Strauss. A romance between former partisan fighter Shalom (Raz) and Ewa (Sela) becomes tense when Ewa is accused of having been a Kapo at Auschwitz.

The story deals with Holocaust trauma and was inspired by the real-life story of Tadmor's mother and his maternal grandparents. The film received its international premiere at the 81st Venice International Film Festival in 2024 and was released in Israeli theatres on 16 January 2025.

== Plot summary ==
In the 1950s, Shalom (Raz), one of the Jewish partisans in Europe during the Holocaust, now lives near Tiberias with his wife, Gita (Shpigelman) and their daughter, Esti (Sivan Tadmor).

In Israel, Shalom assumes a leadership role in his neighbourhood whilst also working as a quality control manager at a seltzer factory. Meanwhile, his wife, Gita is consumed by the trauma of the Holocaust and losing her family.

The humdrum of the neighbourhood is interrupted by the arrival of a beautiful seamstress, Ewa (Sela) and her daughter, Hannah. Shalom gets closer to Ewa when Gita is away at a rest home, while Hannah and Esti also become friends. Shalom soon falls in love with Ewa.

Meanwhile, Shalom's friend, Asher is hopeful that his wife survived the Holocaust and that they will be reunited. He attempts to learn of her fate and through acquaintances, Ewa is accused of having been a kapo in Auschwitz. Ewa denies the claim but sows doubt in the neighbourhood as those around her question how her daughter was able to survive the war. Shalom wants to believe Ewa but also feels burdened by the gravity of the allegations.

== Cast ==
- Rotem Sela as Ewa
- Lior Raz as Shalom
- Zohar Strauss as Asher
- Netta Shpigelman as Gita, Shalom's wife
- Sivan Tadmor as Esti
- Gal Friedman as Janek
- Anastasia Averbukh as Hana

== Production ==
As part of their preparation, Tadmor and Sela engaged in extensive research of Kapos, learning how the role was thrust on them and how some were victims of sexual abuse in the camps.

Tadmor has spoken about the film's relationship with present-day Israel: "There are 400 soldiers who were killed in this war; there are people who went through October 7; there are people who survived the massacre at the music festival and have already committed suicide. There are so many kinds of trauma that it will take them a long period of time to heal from them.

“And in a small way, it is reminiscent of what the people returning from the forests and from Auschwitz went through after World War II… All the characters in Soda, they all have their post-trauma, and I feel what happens in the film really reflects what people are going through today. I hope this war ends quickly, and soon we can really say that this war is over.”

=== Filming ===
It was filmed in Kibbutz HaOn, Kibbutz Givat Brenner, Haifa and Georgia.

=== Release ===
The film was first released on 22 March 2024 for Israeli Cinema Day.

The film received its European premiere in the Horizons section of the 81st Venice International Film Festival which took place between August and September 2024.

The film was released theatrically in Israel on 16 January 2025. The film's release was delayed in the wake of the October 7 attacks, Tadmor explained: "We all hesitated about releasing films after October 7. With the heavy sorrow the country was facing, we didn’t know what was going to be with cinema, if people were going to go back to the movies at all. Who had the strength to go to a movie? Especially not to a dramatic movie."

The film will receive its British premiere at the Seret international film festival in May 2025.

In March 2025, the film was again featured in the program for Israeli Cinema Day.

== Reception ==
The film was nominated for three Ophir Awards in 2024:

- Best Supporting Actor – Zohar Strauss
- Best Art Direction – Eitan Levy
- Best Costume Design – Rachel Ben Dahan

== See also ==
- List of Holocaust films
