= Mary Magdalene (2018 film) =

2018 film by Garth Davis

- Theatrical release poster
- Directed by: Garth Davis
- Written by: Helen Edmundson; Philippa Goslett
- Produced by: Iain Canning; Emile Sherman; Liz Watts
- Starring: Rooney Mara; Joaquin Phoenix; Chiwetel Ejiofor; Tahar Rahim
- Cinematography: Greig Fraser
- Edited by: Alexandre de Franceschi; Melanie Oliver
- Music by: Hildur Guðnadóttir; Jóhann Jóhannsson
- Production companies: Film4; Perfect World Pictures; Porchlight Films; See-Saw Films
- Distributed by: Transmission Films (Australia and New Zealand); IFC Films (United States); Focus Features Universal Pictures(International)
- Release dates: February 26, 2018 (National Gallery, London); March 16, 2018 (United Kingdom); March 22, 2018 (Australia); April 12, 2019 (United States)
- Running time: 120 minutes
- Countries: United States; United Kingdom; Australia
- Language: English
- Box office: $12 million

Mary Magdalene is a 2018 biblical drama film about the woman of the same name, written by Helen Edmundson and Philippa Goslett and directed by Garth Davis. It stars Rooney Mara, Joaquin Phoenix, Chiwetel Ejiofor, and Tahar Rahim.

The film had its world premiere at the National Gallery in London on February 26, 2018. It was released in the United Kingdom on March 16, 2018, by Universal Pictures, in Australia on March 22, 2018, by Transmission Films, and in the United States on April 12, 2019, by IFC Films. It is the last film score completed by composer Jóhann Jóhannsson before his death, created in collaboration with fellow Icelander Hildur Guðnadóttir.

== Plot ==
In the year AD 30 when Judea was under the control of the Roman Empire, a woman named Mary from the small town of Magdala begins to follow Jesus of Nazareth. Her family and father try to interfere with her departing from her home, but she sends them away. She accepts baptism from Jesus and accepts his charge for her and the other apostles to baptize in the name of the Father. She appears to be fully as one with the other apostles in asserting the authority of the spirit of Jesus working through her on behalf of the followers of Jesus.

This causes conflict with the other, male disciples, including Saint Peter. Mary follows Jesus all the way to the Crucifixion and Resurrection. She tries to tell other disciples but they dismiss her. Peter says she weakened the group and Jesus and they part ways, with Mary vowing to carry on the message with her own voice.

In the closing captions, Mary is first identified as having been wrongly called a common prostitute by the early church in the first millennium.

== Cast ==
- Rooney Mara as Mary Magdalene
- Joaquin Phoenix as Jesus of Nazareth
- Chiwetel Ejiofor as Peter
- Tahar Rahim as Judas
- Sarah-Sofie Boussnina as Martha, Mary's friend
- Hadas Yaron as Sarah
- Lubna Azabal as Susannah
- Lior Raz as Magdala Community Leader
- Ryan Corr as Joseph
- Tchéky Karyo as Elisha, Mary's father
- Jacopo Olmo Antinori as Magdala Man
- Shira Haas as Leah
- Uri Gavriel as Philip
- David Schofield as Thomas
- Charles Babalola as Andrew
- Tawfeek Barhom as James
- Tzachi Halevy as Ephraim, a potential suitor for Mary
- Zohar Strauss as John
- Michael Moshonov as Matthew
- Ariane Labed as Rachel
- Theo Theodoridis as Lazarus
- Denis Ménochet as Daniel, Mary's brother
- Irit Sheleg as Mary, Jesus's mother

== Production ==
In February 2016, Rooney Mara joined the cast of the film portraying the titular role of Mary Magdalene, with Garth Davis directing the film, Universal Pictures, Film4 Productions and See-Saw Films co-produced the film, with Iain Canning and Emile Sherman serving as producers. In April 2016, Mara's partner Joaquin Phoenix was in talks to portray the role of Jesus Christ. In July 2016, Chiwetel Ejiofor and Tahar Rahim joined the cast of the film. In September 2016, Hadas Yaron joined the cast of the film. Hildur Guðnadóttir and Jóhann Jóhannsson composed the film's score, the latter's final score before his death in February 2018.

Principal photography began on October 3, 2016 and concluded on December 2, 2016. The film was shot in Rome and in multiple locations in Southern Italy including Matera in Basilicata, Gravina in Puglia in Apulia, Trapani in Sicily and Naples in Campania.

== Release ==
In February 2016, it was reported that The Weinstein Company would distribute the film. It was originally scheduled to be released in the United States and Canada on November 24, 2017. In August 2017, the release was pushed back to March 30, 2018. In January 2018, it was pulled from the schedule. In March 2018, it was announced The Weinstein Company would no longer distribute the film, and the producers were attempting to find another distributor to release the film. IFC Films distributed the film in the United States on April 12, 2019.

The film had its world premiere at the National Gallery in London on February 26, 2018. It screened at the Audi Dublin International Film Festival on February 28, 2018. It was released in Australia on March 22, 2018.

== Reception ==
The film received mixed reviews from critics. According to the review aggregator website Rotten Tomatoes, the film holds an approval rating of 44%, based on 114 reviews, with an average rating of 5.6/10. The site's critics consensus reads, "Mary Magdalene has obvious reverence for its subject; unfortunately, it lacks enough momentum or depth of character to make her story interesting." At Metacritic, the film has a weighted average score of 48 out of 100, based on 24 critics, indicating "mixed or average reviews".

Nick Allen of RogerEbert.com gave Mary Magdalene 4 stars, calling it "an extraordinary film" and writing that it "moved me in a way that no previous film about Christianity ever has."

=== Accolades ===
Award	Date of ceremony	Category	Recipient(s)	Result	Ref(s)
AACTA Awards	3 December 2018	Best Actress	Rooney Mara	Nominated	
AACTA Awards	3 December 2018	Best Original Music Score	Hildur Guðnadóttir, Jóhann Jóhannsson	Nominated	
AACTA Awards	3 December 2018	Best Costume Design	Jacqueline Durran	Nominated	
Asia Pacific Screen Awards	29 November 2018	Best Actress	Rooney Mara	Nominated	
Asia Pacific Screen Awards	29 November 2018	Best Original Score	Hildur Guðnadóttir, Jóhann Jóhannsson	Won	
