= God's Neighbors =

- Theatrical release poster
- Hebrew: המשגיחים
- Directed by: Meni Yaish
- Starring: Roy Assaf; Gal Fridman
- Release date: 19 May 2012 (Cannes)
- Running time: 102 minutes
- Country: Israel
- Language: Hebrew

God's Neighbors (Hebrew: המשגיחים; Ha-Mashgihim) is a 2012 Israeli drama film directed by Meni Yaish.

The film premiered at the 2012 Cannes Film Festival.

== Plot ==
A band of violent Hasidim patrol their Bat Yam neighborhood and terrorize Arabs and non-observant Jews. One named Avi finds himself falling for an unorthodox woman, and his faith is tested.

== Cast ==
- Roy Assaf as Avi Bahar
- Gal Fridman as Kobi Shmaya
- Itzik Golan as Yaniv Lugassi
- Rotem Zissman-Cohen as Miri
