= Ohad Knoller =

Israeli actor (born 1976)

- אוהד קנולר
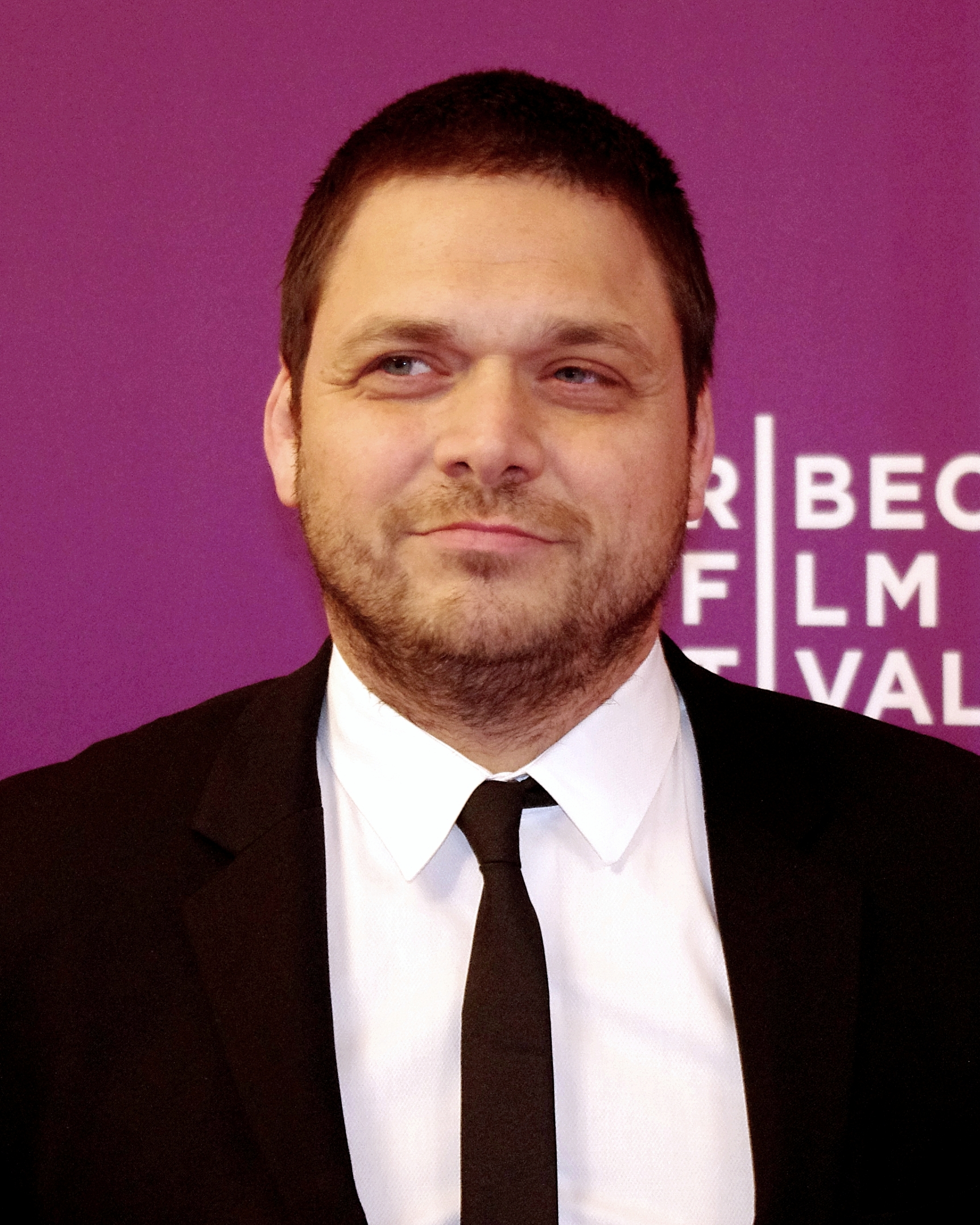
- Knoller at the 2012 Tribeca Film Festival world premiere of Yossi
- Born: 28 September 1976 (age 50); Tel Aviv, Israel

Ohad Knoller (Hebrew: אוהד קנולר; born 28 September 1976) is an Israeli actor. He had roles in the Eytan Fox films Yossi & Jagger and The Bubble, and the Steven Spielberg film Munich.

== Background ==
Knoller was born in Tel Aviv, Israel, to a Jewish family. He is the son of journalist Judith Knoller. Knoller served in as a soldier in the Combat Engineering Corps of the Israel Defense Forces. He was married until 2011 to actress Noa Raban, with whom he has a son.

Knoller attended the Thelma Yellin high school for performing arts in Tel Aviv. In 1990, when he was 14, he starred in his first TV role on Israeli television. At the age of 18, in 1994, he played a role in the movie Under the Domim Tree with Gila Almagor. After his military service he began to study acting at the Nissan Nativ school of acting in Tel Aviv.

His theatre experience at the Jerusalem Khan Theatre included roles including the lead in "The Miser". He also appeared in the movie Super Boy (1998).

From 2008 to 2012 he starred in the television series Srugim as Doctor Nati Brenner.

== Filmography ==
- 1994: Under the Domim Tree – Yurek
- 2002: Yossi & Jagger – Yossi
- 2003: Knafayim (TV Mini-Series) – Ido Geva
- 2004: Year Zero – Bank clerk
- 2004: Delusions – Avi
- 2004: Love Hurts (TV Series) – Eddy
- 2005: Bruno's in Love (TV Movie) – Asaf Bruno
- 2005: Munich – Commando
- 2006: The Bubble – Noam
- 2007: Beaufort – Lieutenant Ziv Faran, bomb disposal officer
- 2007: Redacted – Army psychiatrist
- 2008: Til the Wedding (TV Series) – Nimrod Maliniak
- 2008: Srugim (TV Series) – Nati Brenner, MD
- 2008: Ha'yom Shel Adam (Short) – Yoav
- 2008: Halakeh – Yoni
- 2010: Who do you think you are? (TV Mini-Series)
- 2011: Barefoot (TV Mini-Series)
- 2011: Anachnu Lo Levad – Eddy
- 2012: Yossi – Yossi
- 2012: Urban Tale – Man in jail cell
- 2015: A Tale of Love and Darkness – Israel Zarchi
- 2017: Bayit Bagalil
- 2017: McMafia (TV Series) – Yariv Ableman
- 2018: Operation Finale – Ephraim Ilani
- 2019: The Operative – Stefan
- 2020: Valley of Tears – Colonel Meir Almogi
- 2022/2023: Sleepers (TV series) – Moshe
- 2023: Golda – Ariel Sharon
- 2025: Bloody Murray

== Awards ==
In 2003, Knoller won the Tribeca Award as best male actor for his role in Yossi & Jagger.
