= Vegan Friendly =

Israeli organization

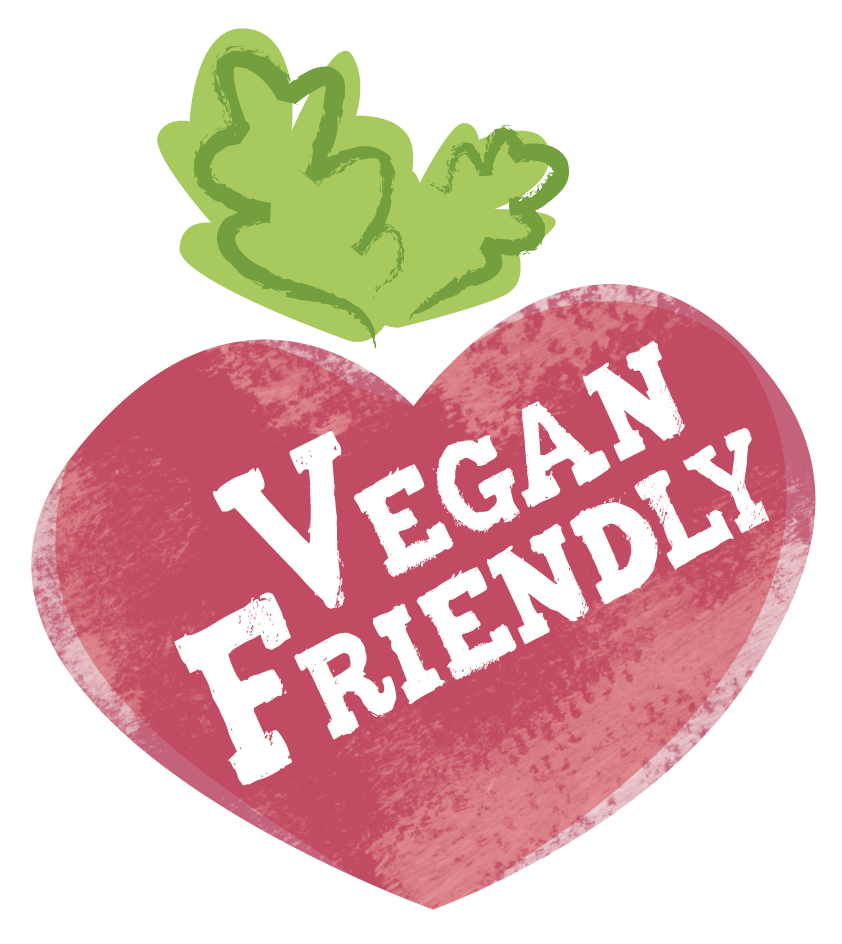
- Founded: 2012; 14 years ago
- Purpose: Veganism
- Leader: Omri Paz
- Website: www.vegan-friendly.co.il/

Vegan Friendly, formerly the Association for the Vegan Future, is an Israeli organization founded in September 2012 by Omri Paz, an advocate of veganism and animal rights.

The association operates in two main areas:

- Promoting the vegan lifestyle: labeling vegan products and vegan-friendly businesses, encouraging businesses to add vegan options, and organizing large-scale events.
- Raising awareness, explanation, and education: achieved through the execution of innovative projects in various fields by the supporters' club - Vegan Active.

Some of the most noticeable projects of Vegan Friendly include: The world's largest vegan festival - Vegan Fest; The first vegan commercial in Israel; "A Mother's Testimony" which included the participation of Rotem Sela; "Food Engineers" project; Gary Yourofsky's visit and lecture tour in Israel; The Vegan congress.

== Vegan Friendly Label ==
=== Labeling Businesses ===
The Vegan Friendly Label was designed to highlight vegan-friendly restaurants and businesses in Israel, making veganism accessible for those who choose to make the transition or want to experience veganism. As of November 2022, the organization certified more than 1,800 businesses and 10,000 products.

The association has also worked to include a category for Vegan Friendly restaurants in all the leading indexes of restaurants and online delivery services, in order to make veganism accessible to the general population as well.

=== Labeling Products ===
In February 2013, the association began the national product labeling project. As part of this project, the association marks vegan food, grooming and clothing products with the label "Vegan Friendly" in large marketing chains and various companies in the Israeli market. As part of the marketing, the association conducts strict tests of the products' components to make sure that they are actually vegan.

By November 2022, over 500 food manufacturers including market leaders such as Unilever, Nestlé, and Strauss Group, use the Vegan Friendly seal and more than 10,000 plant-based products have the Vegan Friendly label nationwide.

As part of the marketing, the association maintains collaborations with food chains and large businesses, providing advice on how to become vegan friendly and more. Some vegan organizations engage with food chains and businesses to provide guidance on vegan-friendly practices.

=== Labeling Companies and Employers ===
Starting from 2020, the association expanded its labeling project to include companies and employers. The label symbolizes a company that is environmentally friendly, compassionate toward animals, and promotes a healthy vegan lifestyle. This encourages a healthy lifestyle and diet within the company, provides a sense of belonging for employees, and offers a particularly positive experience for vegan and vegetarian employees and applicants.

== Projects ==
Among the projects are Vegan Fest, the Vegan Congress, and Vegan Active Club.

In September 2021, the association launched the first advertisement on veganism in Israel's prime time, "Fresh Fresh". It was estimated that one in three Israelis saw the advertisement and tens of thousands from all over the world indicated that they would switch to veganism and vegetarianism.

With the participation of Rotem Sela, an informational video was made which deals with the ethical issues of the dairy industry. This project was watched by about a million Israelis and caused thousands of people to change their consumption habits.

In August 2022, the association sponsored Hapoel Tel Aviv in basketball.

The company started applying their business model to the UK market in 2020, and after two and a half years had over 1,200 businesses and 3,000 products certified as vegan friendly. The also started operating in the USA in 2022.

The company also holds an annual Vegan Fest, which is considered as the world's largest vegan festival. The fourth event took place in Yarkon Park, Tel Aviv in June 2023, and had over 100,000 attendees.
