= The Kind Words =

2015 Israeli film

- Theatrical poster
- המילים הטובות
- Directed by: Shemi Zarhin
- Written by: Shemi Zarhin
- Starring: Rotem Zissman-Cohen; Roy Assaf
- Cinematography: Ronald Plante
- Edited by: Einat Glaser-Zarhin
- Music by: Daniel Scott
- Release date: 28 May 2015
- Running time: 118 minutes
- Countries: Israel; Canada
- Language: Hebrew

The Kind Words (Hebrew: המילים הטובות) is a 2015 Israeli drama film directed by Shemi Zarhin. It was nominated for Best Film at the 2015 Ophir Awards. It was screened in the Contemporary World Cinema section of the 2015 Toronto International Film Festival.

== Plot ==
After the death of their mother, three Jewish Israeli siblings discover the man who raised them might not be their biological father. They plan to visit their aunt in France to learn the truth, but she evades their questions. Later, they find out the man they were looking for is an Algerian, Maurice Leon, but he himself doesn't reveal who he his or his religion.

== Cast ==
- Rotem Zissman-Cohen as Dorona
- Assaf Ben-Shimon as Shai
- Roy Assaf as Netanel
- Levana Finkelstein as Yona Baruch
- Sasson Gabai as The Father
- Tzachi Halevy as Rikki
- Maurice Bénichou as Maurice Lyon

== Reception ==
The Kind Words has a 78% on Rotten Tomatoes based on 9 reviews as well as 75% approval, based on 5 reviews on Metacritic.
