= Delusions (film) =

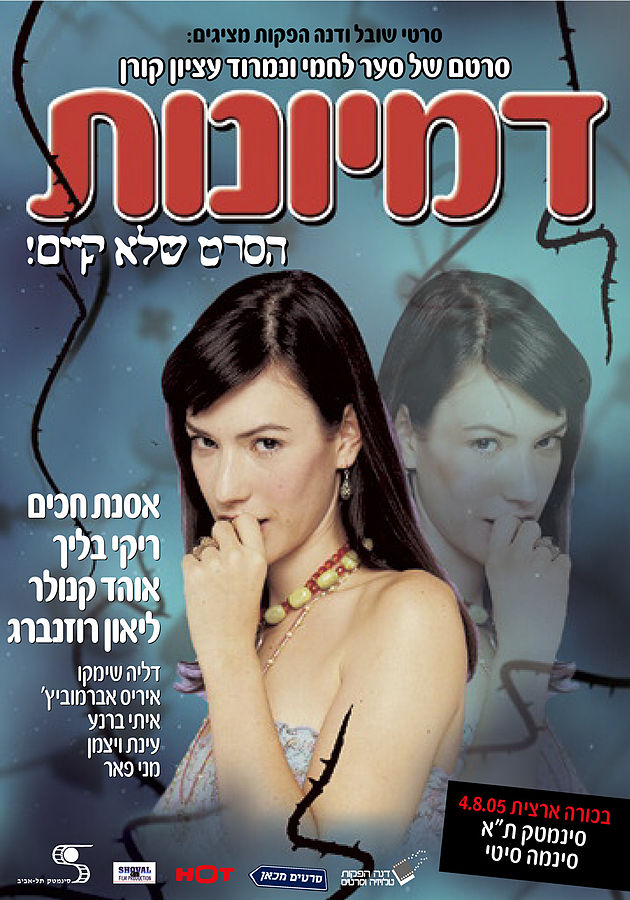
- Theatrical poster
- Hebrew: דמיונות
- Directed by: Nimrod Etsion Koren, Saar Lachmi
- Written by: Nimrod Etsion Koren, Saar Lachmi
- Produced by: Dana Eden, Nimrod Etsion Koren, Liat Shaham
- Starring: Osnat Hakim (Gisele Silver); Riki Blich; Ohad Knoller; Leon Rosenberg; Iris Abramovich; Dalia Shimko; Einat Weitzman
- Cinematography: Rami Katzav
- Edited by: Roee Florentin
- Music by: Jack Katch, Zegunder
- Distributed by: Shuval Films
- Release date: July 2005
- Running time: 91 minutes
- Country: Israel
- Language: Hebrew

Delusions (Hebrew: דמיונות / Dymionot) is a 2005 Israeli film, comedy-drama, Nouvelle Vague film style, that deals with the structure and conventions of cinematic language. Directed by Nimrod Etsion Koren and Saar Lachmi starring Osnat Hakim, Riki Blich, Leon Rosenberg and Ohad Knoller.

== Plot ==
Tamy is a dreamy girl, who has "Poetic Schizophrenia," a rare personality disorder which makes her imagine that her life is a film plot and that she is the star. In real life, she is an ordinary girl, who lives with her cousin Ayala. They both fall in love with Johney Rocker, a hit rock star, who prefers Ayala, and Tamy finds it difficult to get over him. At some point, when Ayala makes Tamy very angry, the director of the film suddenly enters, fires Ayala and casts a new Ayala instead. The story continues as if nothing happened, but the crisis between the girls aggravates, and from time to time, when daily events are hard for Tamy to handle, she "stops the film" and enters her imaginary world in the shape of the director, the actors behind the characters, sound equipment etc. And so it seems that we are watching a film inside a film, but as the story continues we realize that what seems real, the backstage of the movie, is in fact the wild imagination and schizophrenic mind of Tamy.
