= Yossi (film) =

- Theatrical release poster
- הסיפור של יוסי
- Directed by: Eytan Fox
- Screenplay by: Itay Segal
- Produced by: Moshe Edry; Amir Harel; Leon Edry; Eytan Fox
- Starring: Ohad Knoller; Oz Zehavi; Lior Ashkenazi; Orly Silbershatz
- Cinematography: Guy Raz
- Edited by: Yosef Grunfeld
- Music by: Keren Ann
- Production companies: United King Films; Lama Films
- Release date: May 17, 2012
- Running time: 84 minutes
- Country: Israel
- Language: Hebrew
- Budget: $500,000

Yossi (original Hebrew title: הסיפור של יוסי; English transliteration: Ha-Sippur Shel Yossi) is a 2012 drama Israeli film directed by Eytan Fox and written by Itay Segal. It stars Ohad Knoller, Oz Zehavi and Lior Ashkenazi.

Yossi, Fox's fifth feature film, is a sequel to the director's work Yossi & Jagger (2002). The plot takes place a decade after the events in that previous film. It follows the title character, a closeted gay cardiologist who struggles to find meaning in his life while overcoming the loss of his lover and reconciling his past with his future.

== Plot ==
Yossi, a 34-year-old closeted gay man, works as a cardiologist in a hospital in Tel Aviv. He has never completely recovered from the death of the love of his life, ten years before. Unhappy in his personal life, Yossi has thrown himself into his work. When not on call, the physician finds comfort in greasy take-out noodles and soft core gay porn.

One patient, who shows up for a check-up at the hospital, whom Yossi recognises as Varda Amichai, the mother of Jagger, his dead lover. Insisting on treating her, she asks him if they had met before, but Yossi denies it. During the test he tries to get information from her. Varda claims to have no children. At the end of the test he meets her at the exit from the hospital, apparently by accident, and offers her a ride home. During the trip, Varda opens up to him and tells him that in fact she had a son who was killed in Lebanon, and shows him his picture.

Yossi is faced with the demons of loneliness and desperation, compounded by his age and being overweight. He tries online dating but he arranges a meeting using an old and misrepresentative photo. His date, a narcissistic bar owner, is clearly disgusted that the doctor does not match his much slimmer profile.

A mistake in a botched procedure, that nearly costs a patient his life, makes Yossi's supervisor gently upbraid him for not taking a vacation. At work, there are rumors that the quiet and withdrawn Yossi might be gay. Nevertheless, he has attracted the interest of Nina, a nurse infatuated with him. When she kisses him while he is asleep, Yossi wakes up and rebuffs her.

Unable to address his sexuality with his colleagues, Yossi has to face a compromising night out with Moti, a fellow doctor who self-medicates with dope. Recently divorced, Moti is eager to have a good time and takes Yossi along with him to the straight bar scene, inviting him for drinks, drugs and easy women. At a bar, Moti, uninvited, follows Yossi to the bathroom to get him to have sex with a girl, but Yossi flees the scene. Crying, and mourning his dead lover, Yossi spends the night in his car in front of Varda's house. The next morning, he is invited in by Jagger's father. Unburdening his heart, Yossi tells them about his two-year love affair with their son, and the circumstances in which he was killed. The revelations do not go down well with Varda, who asks him to leave, but Jagger's father invites Yossi to see their son's bedroom.

Yossi decides to leave Tel Aviv for an impromptu vacation in the south, intending to go to the Sinai coast. On his way, he meets four young soldiers in a rest stop. They've missed their bus and Yossi gives them a ride to their hotel in Eilat. The soldiers include Yossi in their friendly insults, making fun of the music he has. Dropping them off at a resort, Yossi initially resists their invitation to join them, but changes his mind at the Egyptian border, turning back to take a room at the same hotel. One of the soldiers, Tom, who is openly gay, and is teased about it by his friends, takes it upon himself to befriend Yossi. He gives Yossi a gift certificate for a massage, which Yossi accepts, but doesn't use; he remains shy and circumspect.

At night, during a show by singer-songwriter Keren Ann, Yossi is joined by Tom. They continue to spend time together on a promenade, talking about Yossi's time in the military, and Tom's coming out to his fellow soldiers, but not to his family. Tom goes skinny dipping in the ocean, but steps on a sea urchin. Yossi treats Tom's wound in his hotel room, while Tom flirts with him, but Yossi does not respond. Tom leaves the room, but comes back shortly after and asks Yossi for a kiss. They kiss and go to bed, where Yossi turns off the light, but Tom turns it back on. Shy and overweight, Yossi is embarrassed to be seen naked, but they embrace. After driving down together to Sinai, as they sit on the beach, Tom declares that he would like to stay there, and Yossi surprises him by stating that he'd also like to stay there "forever".

== Cast ==
- Ohad Knoller as Yossi Gutmann
- Oz Zehavi as Tom
- Orly Silbersatz as Varda Amichai
- Lior Ashkenazi as Moti Hoffman
- Ola Schur Selektar as Nina
- Meir Golan as Nimrod
- Shlomi Ben Attar as Fefer
- Amir Jerassi as Benda
- Raffi Tavor as Mr. Amichai
- Shlomo Sadan as Professor Neuman
- Bobbi Jene Smith as Rachelle

== Reception ==
Rotten Tomatoes reported that 87% of 31 sampled critics gave the film positive reviews. Metacritic, which assigns a weighted mean rating out of 100 to reviews from film critics, has a rating score of 65 based on 15 reviews.

Ella Taylor from NPR called the film “Funny, exuberant and shamelessly seductive, Yossi is an unabashedly populist entertainment with a spirit conciliatory enough to melt the heart of any naysayer." Many reviewers single out Ohad Knoller for praise with Frank Scheck from The Hollywood Reporter commenting that he manages" to make his character compelling even at his most withdrawn and sullen. The extra weight that the actor has packed on gives him an air of vulnerability that makes his character's ultimate emergence from his seemingly impenetrable emotional shell all the more moving".

Robert Abele in Los Angeles Times called Yossi “effortlessly affecting, graced with deadpan humor and a knowingness about lonely lives.“ In his review for Wall Street Journal, Joe Morgenstern described the film as "an affecting and admirably unsentimental portrait of lost love." Stephen Holden in The New York Times gave the film a mixed review commenting that "What began as a reasonably hardheaded look at profound and rapid cultural change turns into a feel-good fantasy of salvation."

== See also ==
- List of lesbian, gay, bisexual or transgender-related films
