= Stitches (2011 film) =

- Film poster
- Hebrew: תפרים
- Directed by: Adiya Imri Orr
- Written by: Adiya Imri Orr
- Produced by: Adi Druker
- Starring: Riki Blich; Itzik Golan; Shira Katznlanbogen
- Cinematography: Meidan Arama
- Edited by: Or Lee-Tal
- Release date: July 23, 2011 (Israel)
- Running time: 18 minutes
- Country: Israel
- Language: Hebrew

Stitches (Hebrew: תפרים, romanized: Tfarim) is a 2011 Israeli short film directed by Adiya Imri Orr. It had its world premiere at the 2012 Tribeca Film Festival. The film was named a critics choice, and received the festival's 2012 Student Visionary Award.

== Synopsis ==
Amit and Noa are life partners in their 30s. While in the hospital after the birth of their first daughter, the women finally tell the truth to each other.

== Cast ==
- Riki Blich - Amit
- Itzik Golan - Shaul - Piper
- Shira Katznlanbogen - Noa

== Awards ==
In 2012, the film won the Student Visionary Award at the Tribeca Film Festival. Among the reasons given for awarding the prize: "The film is well-written ... and powerfully acted.
