= Bloody Murray =

Israeli television series

- Hebrew: בלאדי מורי
- Genre: Romantic comedy
- Created by: Stav Idisis
- Directed by: Yogev Yefet; Stav Idisis
- Starring: Naomi Levov; Rotem Sela; Shlomi Tapiero; Yoram Toledano; Omer Etzion; Tom Avni; Ohad Knoller; Gal Amitai
- Country of origin: Israel
- Original language: Hebrew
- No. of seasons: 2
- No. of episodes: 16

Production
- Running time: 27–45 minutes
- Production company: Kastina Communications

Original release
- Network: yes
- Release: 2 June 2022 – present

Bloody Murray, (Hebrew: בלאדי מורי) is an Israeli romantic comedy television series following the love lives of two best friends played by Naomi Levov and Rotem Sela. The Tel Aviv-set series was created by Stav Idisis and premiered on 2 June 2022 on yes. The series was renewed for a second season, which premiered on 14 September 2025.

== Plot summary ==
=== Season 1 ===
Murray (Levov) gets into a car accident and hits another car. The driver of the other car is Lior (Tapiero), a handsome and mischievous man who flirts with Murray. Murray drives away before sharing insurance details with Lior; however, he manages to track down her address as she has left behind a luggage tag.

Murray isn't home when Lior arrives at her apartment, but Dana (Sela), Murray's roommate, lets him in and they flirt, eventually sleeping together that night and forming a relationship.

Murray finds it difficult to break contact with her immature ex-boyfriend Gur (Etzion), and the two are stuck in a toxic on-again, off-again cycle. Murray, who initially felt a connection with Lior, increasingly compares him favourably to Gur. Lior is kind, loving, fun and reliable. Gur is temperamental and difficult. Murray's failed pregnancy with Gur finally brings their relationship to an end.

In parallel, Murray begins to develop the screenplay for a romantic comedy focused on her relationship with Dana and her growing feelings for Lior.

Dana, dismayed by Lior's decision to spend longer in Australia for work, senses that he is becoming disinterested in the relationship. She sleeps with her long-time workplace crush, Dr. Atias.

Lior unexpectedly returns home, and Dana has to hide her infidelity and invents a story that Murray and Dr. Atias are a couple. Ironically, Murray and Dr. Atias spend more time together and develop an opposites-attract romantic chemistry.

However, at Murray's sister's wedding, Dana tells Murray that she has read Murray's script and that it helped her understand her own feelings for Dr. Atias. She explains that she has told Lior the truth about her infidelity and that he has left her.

=== Season 2 ===
The season starts with both Murray and Dana, now both single, and considering starting and raising a family together. They do however meet new love interests now that Lior and Dr. Atias are no longer part of their lives. Dana begins a relationship with Daniel (Amitai) and Murray connects with Yoel (Avni), a film director she meets at a film festival.

== Cast ==
- Naomi Levov as Murray, a film lecturer and screenwriter, orphaned by her parents who were killed in a car accident
- Rotem Sela as Dana, Murray's best friend and roommate, a physician specializing in gynecology and obstetrics
- Shlomi Tapiero as Lior, Dana's partner
- Yoram Toledano as Dr. Atias, a senior physician and deputy director of the department in which Dana interns
- Tom Avni as Yoel, a director (S2)
- Gal Amitai as Daniel (S2)
- Ohad Knoller (S2)
- Aviv Pinkas as Noam, Murray's sister
- Miriam Zohar as Murray's grandmother (S1)
- Lea Koenig as Murray's grandmother (S2)
- Ala Dakka as Amir, a physician and Dana's Arab colleague
- Elad Atrakchi as Idan, a physician and Dana's gay colleague
- Omer Moskowitz as Roy, Noam's husband
- Adam Gabbay as Dori, Idan's partner and Murray's friend

=== Guest ===
- Ofer Shechter as himself, Murray's potential neighbour (S1)
- Adva Dadon as herself, Israeli broadcast journalist (S2)

== Reception ==
In March 2022, the series won the Best Comedy Series award at the Series Mania festival in France.

Adrian Hennigan praised the series in Haaretz, describing it as a "rewarding comedy" and praised Levov: "Levov is a terrific comedy actor and delivers plenty of yuks as the selfish film lecturer/screenwriter who’s stuck in a rut professionally and personally."

Alan Zeitlin of the The Jewish Journal of Greater Los Angeles praised the series: "Besides the great writing, the chemistry of the two leads is palpable," and concluded "Like a good cocktail, “Bloody Murray” goes down with a kick that makes you want to have a second."

In 2026, the second season was awarded with five wins at the Israeli Television Academy Awards, including Best Comedy-Drama or Sitcom; Supporting Actress in a Comedy (Sela); Lead Actress in a Comedy for (Levov); Comedy Directing (Idisis); and Comedy Writing (Idisis).

== Broadcast ==
The series in its original format (in Hebrew with subtitles) has been sold internationally for broadcast on network and pay television.

In 2023, the series was acquired by the Canadian Broadcasting Corporation, Canada's public broadcaster, for broadcast in Canada. The following year, it was acquired by Arte for broadcast in France and Germany.

In 2026, the series was acquired by Jewish streamer, ChaiFlicks, for broadcast in the United States, Canada, New Zealand, Australia and the United Kingdom.

== Adaptations ==
In October 2024, it was announced that the series will receive a Georgian adaptation by Cavea+, the country's first official streaming platform. This marks the first scripted Israeli TV program to be adapted in Georgia.
