= Merav Doster =

Israeli female screenwriter

Merav Doster (Hebrew: מרב דוסטר; born 1976 in Israel) is an Israeli female screenwriter. Merav Doster came to fame with her first feature film Eyes Wide Open.

Her first film was selected by the Cannes Film Festival in 2009, and competed for two awards: "Un Certain Regard" and the Caméra d'Or.

Doster currently lives in Tel Aviv, Israel.

== Filmography ==
Eyes Wide Open (2009)
