= Roy Assaf (actor) =

Israeli actor

- רועי אסף
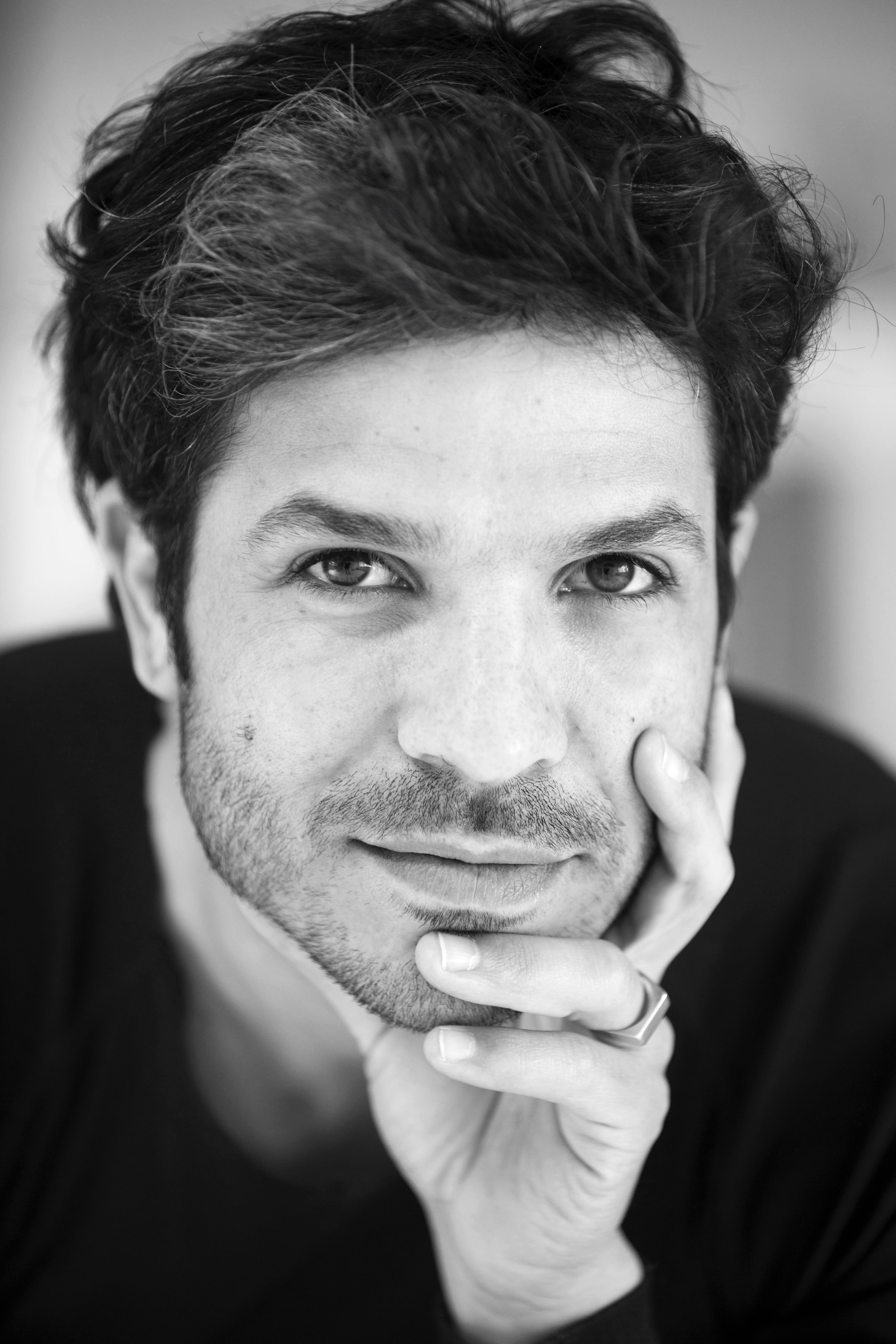
- Born: 2 January 1979 (age 47); Rishon LeZion, Israel
- Occupation: Actor
- Years active: 2000-present

Roy Assaf (Hebrew: רועי אסף; born 2 January 1979) is an Israeli actor. He appeared in more than twenty films since 2000.

== Biography ==
Asaf began studying acting at a young age in theater director and acting israeli teacher Dr. Deborah Miller's drama workshop. He studied at the Reali High School in Rishon LeZion. He was accepted into the IDF Theater and served as an actor and theater commander. After his military service, he studied acting at the Nissan Nativ Acting Studio in Tel Aviv. During his studies, he received an excellence scholarship from the America-Israel Cultural Foundation.

He lives in Tel Aviv with his partner, actress Ornella Bass.

== Filmography ==
(Selective)

Year	Title	Role	Notes
2009	Jaffa		
2009	The Assassin Next Door		
2012	God's Neighbors		
2015	The Kind Words		
2015	Wedding Doll	Omir	
2015	False Flag (Kfulim)	Yuval	
2022	Matchmaking	Nechama's father	
