= Jeruzalem (film) =

JeruZalem
- Theatrical Release Poster
- Directed by: Doron Paz; Yoav Paz
- Written by: Doron Paz; Yoav Paz
- Produced by: Shaked Berenson; Patrick Ewald; Rotem Levim; Nir Miretzky
- Starring: Yael Grobglas; Yon Tumarkin; Danielle Jadelyn; Tom Graziani
- Cinematography: Rotem Yaron
- Edited by: Reut Hahn
- Production company: Epic Pictures Group
- Distributed by: Epic Pictures Releasing (United States); Transfax Film Productions (Israel)
- Release date: July 10, 2015 (Jerusalem Film Festival)
- Running time: 94 minutes
- Country: Israel
- Language: English
- Box office: $107,024

Jeruzalem (stylized as JeruZalem) (Hebrew: ג'רוזלם) is a 2015 English-language Israeli supernatural horror film. Written and directed by Doron and Yoav Paz, the film stars Yael Grobglas, Yon Tumarkin, Danielle Jadelyn, and Tom Graziani.

== Plot ==
In 1972, two priests were called to record an event at Jerusalem. It is revealed that Jewish, Muslim, and Christian priests were all called to perform an exorcism on a woman who died three days before. Her son claimed she was calm at first when she returned from the grave to his home, but became violent later, injuring her husband. After failed attempts to cure her, the priests decided they had no choice but to kill the woman. In a final attempt, the woman screamed while sprouting leather wings, just before a priest killed her with a derringer. The narrator states that those strange events of 1972 were the "first proof" of a gateway to Hell in Jerusalem.

In the present, two Jewish American tourists, Rachel Klein and Sarah Pullman, plan a vacation to Israel. Sarah is mourning the loss of her deceased brother and her father gives her a pair of smart glasses. The rest of the movie is taken from the glasses' POV. On the plane, they meet a fellow American student named Kevin Reed. Kevin is fascinated by religious mythology, especially the Jinns of Islam, the Golem of Jewish mythology, and the undead or zombies, which he believes to all be manifestations of the same evil. He suggests that Rachel and Sarah join him on his journey to Jerusalem, and mentions that he wants to spend Yom Kippur there. Sarah becomes infatuated with Kevin and convinces her friend to go to Jerusalem. On their way to the hostel, they meet a local who believes that he is King David. The local warns them to leave the city because it is dangerous, warning that something terrible will happen on Yom Kippur, but the friends believe he is insane.

In the hostel they meet Palestinian Omar and his father Fauzi, who run the hostel. The local news channel reports of a murder that has taken place in the Old City with a massive amount of blood found on the street, but no body. While Rachel starts an affair with Omar, Kevin and Sarah begin an intimate relationship. The four friends enjoy their time in Jerusalem, party, and tour around the city. When Sarah gets lost in the Old City at night, she is frightened of an unearthly growling and screams she hears. Kevin shows Sarah the documentary, from the beginning of the movie, that he found on the internet with film footage of the 1972 exorcism.

When they visit the Western Wall in Jerusalem, Sarah wishes for her dead brother Joel to return. As soon as she puts the paper into the Wall, a swarm of black birds fly overhead. The four friends leave to tour Solomon's Quarries. There, Kevin sees drawings of black angels on the wall, feels nervous, and leaves to research the drawings in the city's archives. While Sarah joins him, Rachel and Omar stay at the quarries. After investigating, Kevin warns Sarah to leave the city, because after this day "there won't be a tomorrow." Sarah also thinks that there is something strange going on, but Rachel refuses to leave.

Kevin insists on leaving, but Omar and his father believe that Kevin is crazy and send him to a mental asylum. Later at night, Sarah witnesses Israeli Air Force planes bomb parts of the city. The local media reports it as a potential terrorist attack and that the inhabitants should leave Jerusalem. Sarah tries to rescue Kevin from the asylum, but Rachel and Omar, being escorted by two Israeli soldiers, refuse to stop and insist that they keep moving. Sarah convinces the soldiers to take her into the asylum to save Kevin.

In the asylum, Sarah and the soldiers come across mental patients and one who is possessed. After having to shoot down a patient, the soldiers leave Sarah behind and go to escape the city. Sarah finds Kevin and frees him after retrieving a set of keys, while hiding from a demon. While hiding, she also meets the man who claimed to be King David, who reveals himself to be the son of the possessed woman who was killed in 1972. They manage to escape and meet Omar, his father, and Rachel at the city walls. However, the gates are closed and the city is under quarantine. David ignores orders from the soldiers and is shot down. The four friends do not want to give up on their escape, and Omar's father suggests sneaking out through underwater caves he knew as a child.

On their way there, they are met by demons who attack the civilians, biting and/or scratching to infect them as well as eat their flesh. Kevin believes that the doors to hell have somehow been opened and that the End of Days has begun. Sarah soon realizes that Rachel has been infected as well when she is scratched by a demon. Kevin warns Sarah that Rachel's condition is contagious and that she will eventually change and attack them. The soldiers from earlier try to shoot Rachel, but they are attacked by a demon before they are able to do so. One is killed and the group retreats into the caves.

In the caves, Rachel's condition worsens. Demons begin to attack the friends and Rachel transforms, her eyes turning black. Sarah falls down and Rachel regains control over herself, warning Sarah to run before killing herself. Sarah accidentally kills Omar's father with a sword taken from a suit of armor, and when Omar realizes what happened, he commits suicide rather than being changed into a demon or be eaten alive by the creatures, leaving Kevin and Sarah alone. They meet a creature with white wings, whom the smart glasses identifies as Joel, Sarah's deceased brother returned as an angel. Joel leads them from the caves. Upon reaching the other side of the wall, Sarah realizes that she has many scratches similar to Rachel's on her legs and arms. She turns into a demon and flies into the air, while Kevin looks on in horror.

In the final shot, thousands of demons are seen flying above Jerusalem as military helicopters surround the scene and fires burn throughout the city.

== Cast ==
- Danielle Jadelyn as Sarah Pullman
- Yael Grobglas as Rachel Klein
- Yon Tumarkin as Kevin Reed
- Tom Graziani as Omar

== Overview ==
JeruZalem is a zombie/possession thriller. The big "Z" in the title refers to the word "zombie," although what viewers see in the film would not be considered "traditional" zombies. Doron Paz and Yoav Paz wrote and directed the film. Yael Grobglas, Yon Tumarkin, Danielle Jadelyn and Tom Graziani starred in the film. On 10 July 2015 it was first shown at the Jerusalem Film Festival. The film was released on DVD and Blu-ray. JeruZalem was filmed in Jerusalem. Some historical sites, ancient architectures and religious landmarks are shown in the film. Some background information is given about these sites and their architecture. The film was inspired by the Talmud [Talmud (Eruvin 19a)] line: "There are three gates to hell, one in the desert, one in the ocean, and one in Jerusalem." Doron Paz and Yoav Paz also worked as the producers for the film. They raised most of the $160,000 budget themselves. The film was sold to many different countries around the world, among them were the United States, UK, Germany/Benelux, India, Japan, France, Venezuela, and the Philippines.

== Sequel ==
In June 2016 it was announced that the Paz brothers want to film a sequel. The sequel will be filmed in Jerusalem and will take place ten years after the events of the first film. It is about a man who is trying to find his daughter that has gotten into a religious cult.

The sequel was previously scheduled to be released in 2020, but was postponed due to the COVID-19 pandemic. It was rescheduled to January 1, 2023 but it was not released.

As of 2025, there has been no update on the sequel's development.

== Reception ==
On review aggregator Rotten Tomatoes, JeruZalem holds an approval rating of 56%, based on 25 reviews, with an average score of 5.6 out of 10. Its consensus reads, "Jeruzalem's setting adds an interesting twist to this found-footage horror outing, even if the end result is still somewhat pedestrian." On Metacritic, the film has a weighted average score of 45 out of 100, based on 8 critic reviews, indicating "mixed or average reviews."

== Accolades ==
Award ceremony	Category	Recipient	Result	Ref.
Jerusalem Film Festival	Audience Award	Doron Paz, Yoav Paz	Won	
Jerusalem Film Festival	Best Editing	Reut Hahn, Yoav Paz, Doron Paz	Won	
Jerusalem Film Festival	Best Israeli Feature	Doron Paz, Yoav Paz	Nominated	
Awards of the Israeli Film Academy	Best Makeup	Rinat Alony, Takach Richard, Sagit Emet - JeruZalem	Nominated	
Dracula Film Festival	Best Feature Film	Doron Paz, Yoav Paz	Won	
