= Prime Minister's Children =

- ילדי ראש הממשלה
- Genre: Politics; Serial drama
- Created by: Noa Magen; Shachar Rotman
- Developed by: Noa Magen; Shachar Rotman
- Written by: Noa Magen; Shachar Rotman
- Directed by: Alon Banari
- Starring: Rami Heuberger; Michaela Eshet; Lee Biran; Alona Tal
- Country of origin: Israel
- Original language: Hebrew
- No. of seasons: 2
- No. of episodes: 18

Production
- Executive producers: Ram Landes; Kfir Yonsof-Weiss
- Running time: 35-40 minutes
- Production company: Keshet Media Group

Original release
- Network: Channel 2
- Release: 17 May 2011 – 15 September 2012

Prime Minister's Children (Hebrew: ילדי ראש הממשלה; Yaldei Rosh HaMemshala) was an Israeli political drama television series aired from 2011 to 2012. It tells the story of the fictional Prime Minister Saul Agmon, and the impact of his highly position on his family, especially his children.

Eighteen episodes, divided into two seasons, were produced as a whole. The series was first shown in Israel in the summer of 2011. The show follows a fictional prime minister, Shaul Agmon, in his first year in office, along with his wife Diti and children Libi and Golan. Agmon's appointment changes all their lives drastically, making them feel as if they live in their own private prison. Along side this struggle, the series presents the maturing of two women, the prime minister's wife and his eldest daughter.

== Cast ==
- Rami Heuberger - Prime Minister Shaul Agmon
- Michaela Eshet - Yehudit 'Diti' Agmon
- Alona Tal - Libi Agmon
- Lee Biran - Golan Agmon
- Evelin Hagoel - Amalia Bilchik
- Marina Maximilian Blumin - Alin
- Gila Almagor - Rachel Agmon
- Sharon Alexander - Hilik
- Itay Turgeman - Kobi Dahan
- Lior Raz - Asael
- Efrat Aviv - Iris
- Shmuel Atzmon - Shimon Agmon
- Nina Kotler - Yardena
