= A Body That Works =

Israeli television drama series

- גוף שלישי
- Genre: Drama
- Created by: Shay Capon; Shira Hadad; Dror Mishani
- Directed by: Shay Capon
- Starring: Yehuda Levi; Rotem Sela; Lior Raz; Gal Malka
- Country of origin: Israel
- Original language: Hebrew
- No. of seasons: 1
- No. of episodes: 8

Production
- Running time: 50 minutes
- Production company: Kuma Productions

Original release
- Network: Keshet 12
- Release: 13 February 2023 – present

A Body That Works (Hebrew: גוף שלישי), translit. Guf Shlishi) is an Israeli surrogacy television drama series created by Shay Capon, Shira Hadad and Dror Mishani. It stars Yehuda Levi, Rotem Sela, Gal Malka and Lior Raz. It premiered on February 13th, 2023 on Keshet 12 in Israel. It is broadcast internationally by Netflix. It has been renewed for a second season.

== Plot summary ==
After a series of heartbreaking miscarriages, married couple Elie (Sela) and Ido (Levi) decide to become parents through surrogacy. Through an agency, they recruit Chen (Malka), an unmarried single mother. Elie and Chen fail to connect with the former becoming increasingly isolated from the pregnancy. This leads to tensions in Elie and Ido’s marriage, especially as Ido and Chen grow closer. Frustrated by the situation, Elie embarks on an affair with her client Tomer (Raz). Meanwhile, Ido and Chen develop feelings for each other.

== Cast and characters ==
- Rotem Sela as Elie Avrahami, a 37 year-old literary editor and Ido's wife. She was born on a kibbutz where she lived in the Children's house and from the age of six, grew up in Haifa. Her parents divorced and her father moved to South Africa. She has a PhD in the literature of Yehoshua Kenaz.
- Yehuda Levi as Ido Avrahami, a 42 year-old lawyer at a private firm and Elie's husband. He grew up on a moshav near Jerusalem. At the end of the first season, his son, Michael is born.
- Gal Malka as Chen Ben-Atar, a 29 year-old single mother to ten year-old Uri. She is from Petah Tikva and works in customer service at a cell phone company. She becomes a surrogate for Ido and Elie, and sees the financial compensation as a way to rent an apartment for herself and Uri. She stays with Uri in her father's small apartment and has a strained relationship with her father. At the end of the first season she gives birth to Michael, Elie and Ido's son.
- Lior Raz as Tomer, a film director that gets close to Elie as she edits his memoirs.
- Moris Cohen as Felix Ben-Atar, Chen's father and Uri's grandfather
- Ido Silem as Uri, Chen's son
- Itay Turgeman as Yaniv, Chen's ex-partner. He was mostly absent as Uri was growing up. He has now reestablished a relationship with his son, sought joint custody and has a baby with his current partner.
- Yael Eitan as Roni, Elie's younger sister. She did not grow up the Children's house at the Kibbutz as the program and practice had ended by the time she was born. She has a daughter and in the first season is pregnant with her second child.

== Production ==
Co-creator, Shira Hadad was motivated by her personal experiences to create the show. Her son was born through surrogacy ten years earlier.

== Release ==
The show premiered on Keshet 12 on 13 February 2023 in Israel. In February 2024, Netflix picked up show for international distribution on its platforms in the United States, Europe and Latin America. The show is broadcast by SBS in Australia and the CBC in Canada. AMC Networks have the rights to distribute the show in Spain and Portugal.

== Reception ==
The show was Israel's highest rated drama in 2023, with viewership increasing as the series progressed. In 2023, Rotem Sela and Gal Malka were awarded the Best Actress prize for an international series at Series Mania in France. Hannah Brown of The Jerusalem Post praised the casting, particularly Malka: "She is by turns assertive and vulnerable and is particularly good in scenes where she has to deal with the social welfare system when her long-absent ex wants custody of their child."

In the month of its international release on Netflix, it featured in the top 10 of most watched shows in France, Germany, Poland, Romania, Argentina, Mexico, Brazil, Colombia and Italy.

== See also ==
- Israeli television
- Culture of Israel
