= Riki Blich =

Israeli actress

- ריקי בליך
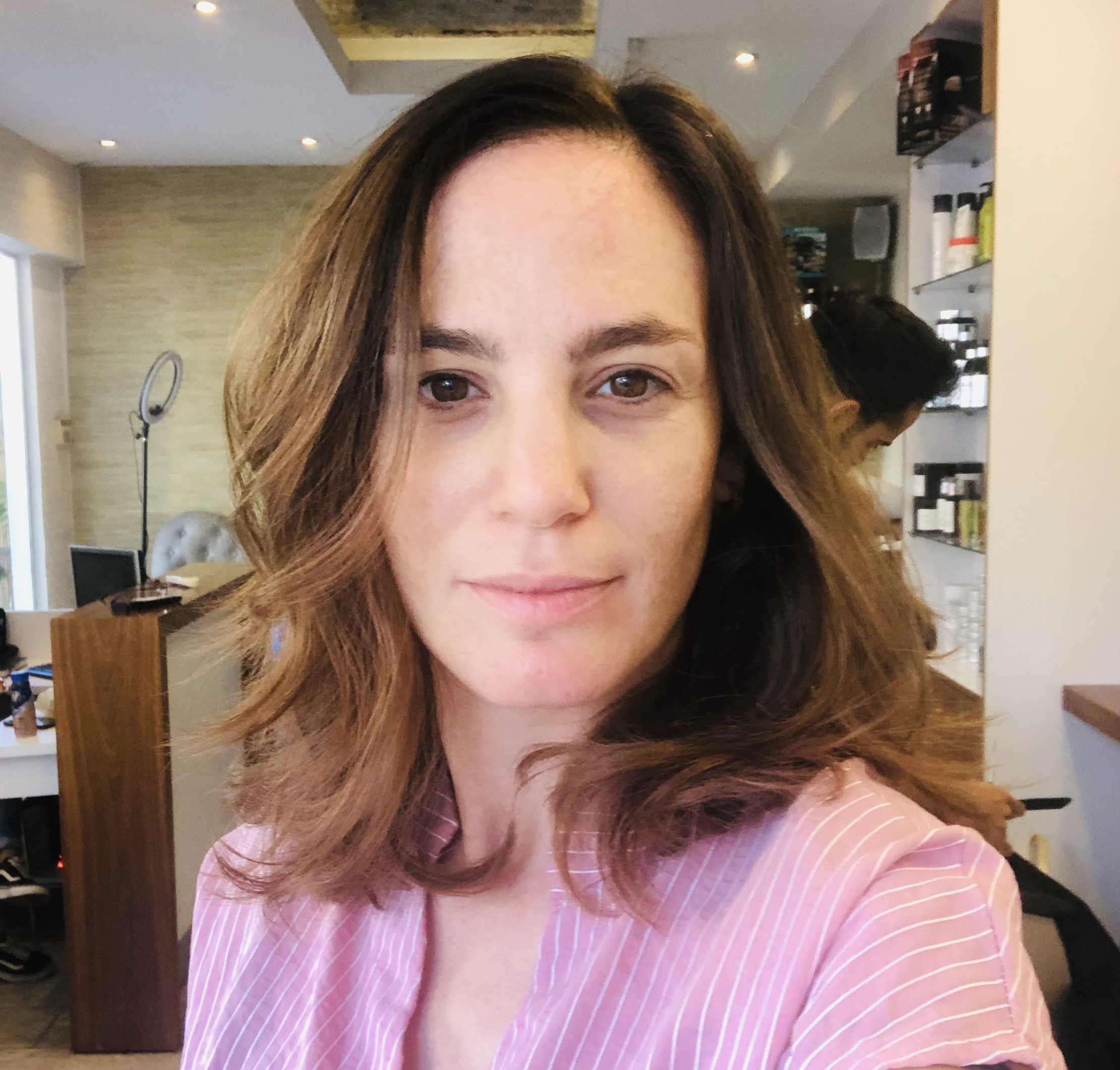
- Blich in 2019
- Born: Rivka Blich; September 29, 1979 (age 45); Israel
- Years active: 1994–present

Rivka "Riki" Blich (Hebrew: ריקי בליך; born September 29, 1979) is an Israeli actress and comedian.

She was born to parents who immigrated from Soviet Russia in 1973.

== History ==
=== 1991 ===
In 1991, when Riki was 12 years old, she made her debut on Channel 1 in the channel's children's show Headcatching a Head hosted by Nathan Datner along with other young actors such as Dana Dvorin.

== Filmography ==
=== TV-series ===
- 2003: Esti HaMekho'eret
- 2004: Ktzarim
- 2005: Elvis, Rosenthal, VeHaIsha Hamistorit
- 2006: Elvis
- 2006: Lo Hivtachti Lach
- 2011- 2015: Downtown Precinct

=== Films ===
- 1994: Under the Domim Tree
- 2002: Bechora
- 2004: Delusions
- 2006: A Wedding Film
- 2011: Stitches
