= Shlomit Malka =

Israeli model

Shlomit Malka שלומית מלכה
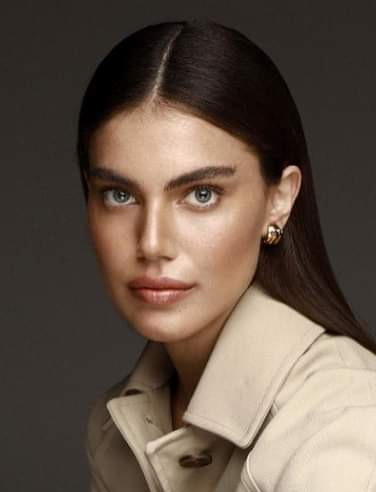
- Malka in 2023
- Born: 23 December 1993 (age 32); Rehovot, Israel
- Other name: Shiloh Malca
- Occupation: Model
- Years active: 2011–present
- Spouse: Yehuda Levi (m. 2017; div. 2021)
- Modeling information
- Height: 1.75 m (5 ft 9 in)
- Hair color: Brown
- Eye color: Blue-Green
- Agency: List: The Lions (New York, Los Angeles) Women Management (Paris) Women Direct (Milan) Titanium Management (London) Uno Models (Barcelona) Full Circle Model Management (Cape Town) Place Models (Hamburg) MC2 Miami (Miami) Elinor Shahar Personal Management (Tel Aviv)

Shlomit Malka (Hebrew: שלומית מלכה; born 23 December 1993) is an Israeli fashion model. Earlier in her career, she was credited as Shiloh Malka, but she has since been credited as her birth name.

She has appeared in major international campaigns for L'Oreal, Armani, Ralph Lauren, Maybelline, Lancome, Chanel, Schwarzkopf, Bershka, Bebe, and Müller Yogurt. In 2013, she broke into the ten highest earning models in Israel.

== Early life and career ==
Shlomit Malka was born in Rehovot, Israel, to a Jewish family. Her father is of Moroccan-Jewish descent, while her mother is from Ukraine. Her father Maxim Ron "Max" Malka was a restaurateur, and her mother Anna Magin is a CEO of a PR company. Her parents separated when she was four years old. She also grew up with her mother and maternal grandparents in Kiryat Ekron, Israel. Besides Hebrew, Malka also speaks English and Russian (her mother's native language).

During Malka's first year as a soldier in the Israel Defense Forces, where she served as an instructor in the Combat Engineering Corps special forces unit Yahalom, Malka was discovered by a model agent from her Facebook pictures. She managed to win permission to work during her military service and promptly won contracts with Armani, Ralph Lauren, L'Oreal and Schwarzkopf.

During her military service, the IDF permitted her to take part in modeling shoots after pre-approving her requests so long as she made up the time afterwards. She says that the "balance between the military and modelling makes me feel good. I am grounded all the time". Her personal interests are physics, mathematics, and animal welfare.

In 2013, she was chosen as one of Israel breakout models of the year.

In 2015, she became the face of Italian lingerie company Intimissimi, leading its worldwide campaign, a position previously filled by Irina Shayk, Barbara Palvin, Bar Refaeli and Ana Beatriz Barros. Intimissimi was drawn to her natural beauty.

== Personal life ==
In May 2017, she married Israeli actor and model Yehuda Levi. They resided in Tel Aviv. The couple announced that they separated in June 2021.

On 13 August 2017, Malka had a scooter accident. Passers-by said they found her lying on the ground, unconscious and having suffered a head injury. She was transported to Ichilov Hospital, where she was placed in a medically-induced coma. She had been in critical condition, unable to breathe on her own. A paramedic had called her condition "unstable." She has since fully recovered.
