= Ofir Lobel =

Israeli comedian

Ofir Lobel אופיר לובל
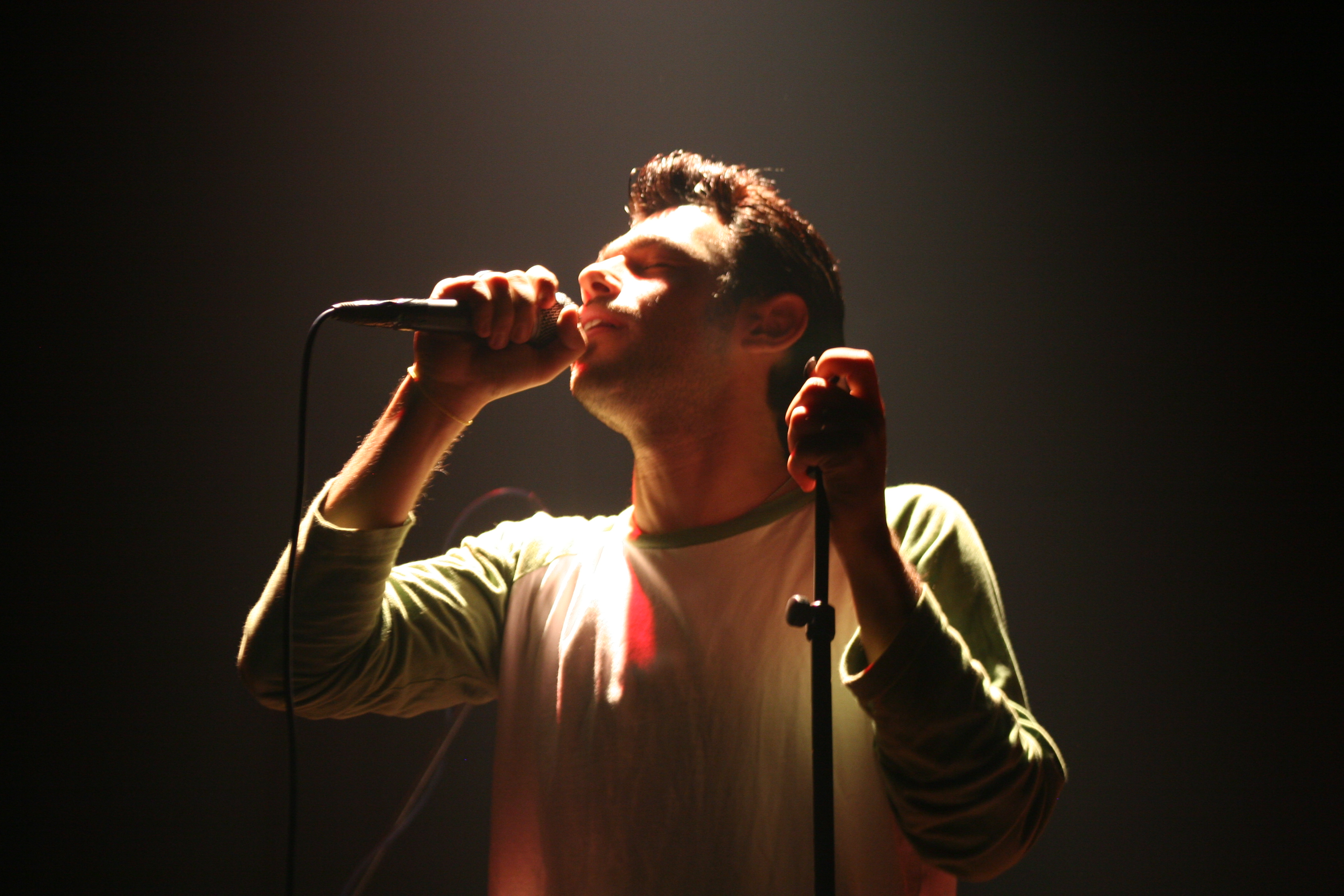

Background information
- Born: Ofir Lobel
- Occupations: is an actor, a singer-songwriter, screenplay writer and a multimedia director.

Ofir Lobel, (Hebrew: אופיר לובל) one third of The Prozak Trio, a successful Israeli comedy group, is an actor, a singer-songwriter, screenplay writer and a multimedia director.

== Biography ==
Ofir was born on May 25, 1976, to his Israeli parents Ron and Judith Lobel who were students at Bologna University in Italy, where he spent the first few years of his life. He is a descendant of well known Rabbi Tzvi Elimelech Spira of Dinov.

During his high school years, at Kibbutz Yad Mordechai in the south of Israel, Ofir studied guitar at the local music conservatory. At that time he formed his first Rock band with some friends. He participated in the Hashomer Hatzair ("The Young Guard") a Zionist youth movement.

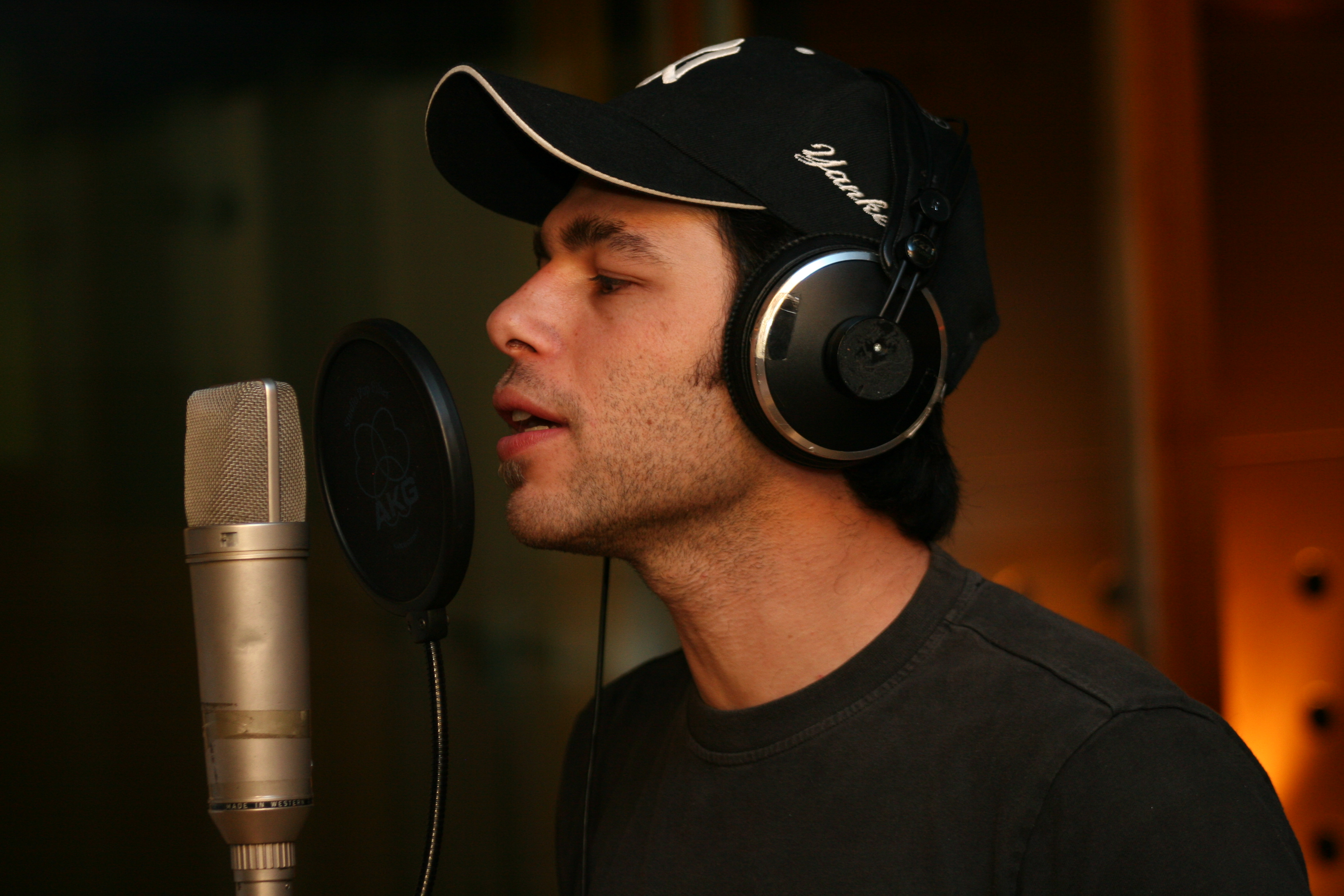
ofir

After graduating from high school, Ofir went to the United States with his family. They lived in Boston, Massachusetts one year. Ofir studied music at Berklee College of Music and was thrilled to purchase his first Gibson Electric guitar. He also studied Computerized Animation at the School of the Museum of Fine Arts, Boston.

Upon his release from the Israel Defense Forces in 1998, Ofir went back to the United States for a few months where he worked as a music instructor for young children.
When he returned to Israel he enrolled at Beit Zvi, School of Acting. During his studies Ofir took part in a number of plays and won the award of "Outstanding Actor of the Year" at the end of his first year. He received the Shraga Fridman Scholarship (in honor of the famous Israeli actor Sharga Fridman).

In 2000, Ofir started to take part in the humorous television series "Domino" which was broadcast every week on the Israeli Channel 2 National Network. He played along with other famous actors and comedians such as Maya Dagan, Adi Ashkenazi Yuval Semo Shloki Koriat and others.
During that time he also became an Internet reporter for the Israeli Tapuz Website. After finishing his studies Ofir acted in several plays as part of the Israeli Social Theater for Teenagers and at the same time founded "The Prozak Trio" together with his two schoolmates Yuval Semo and Shlomi Koriat.

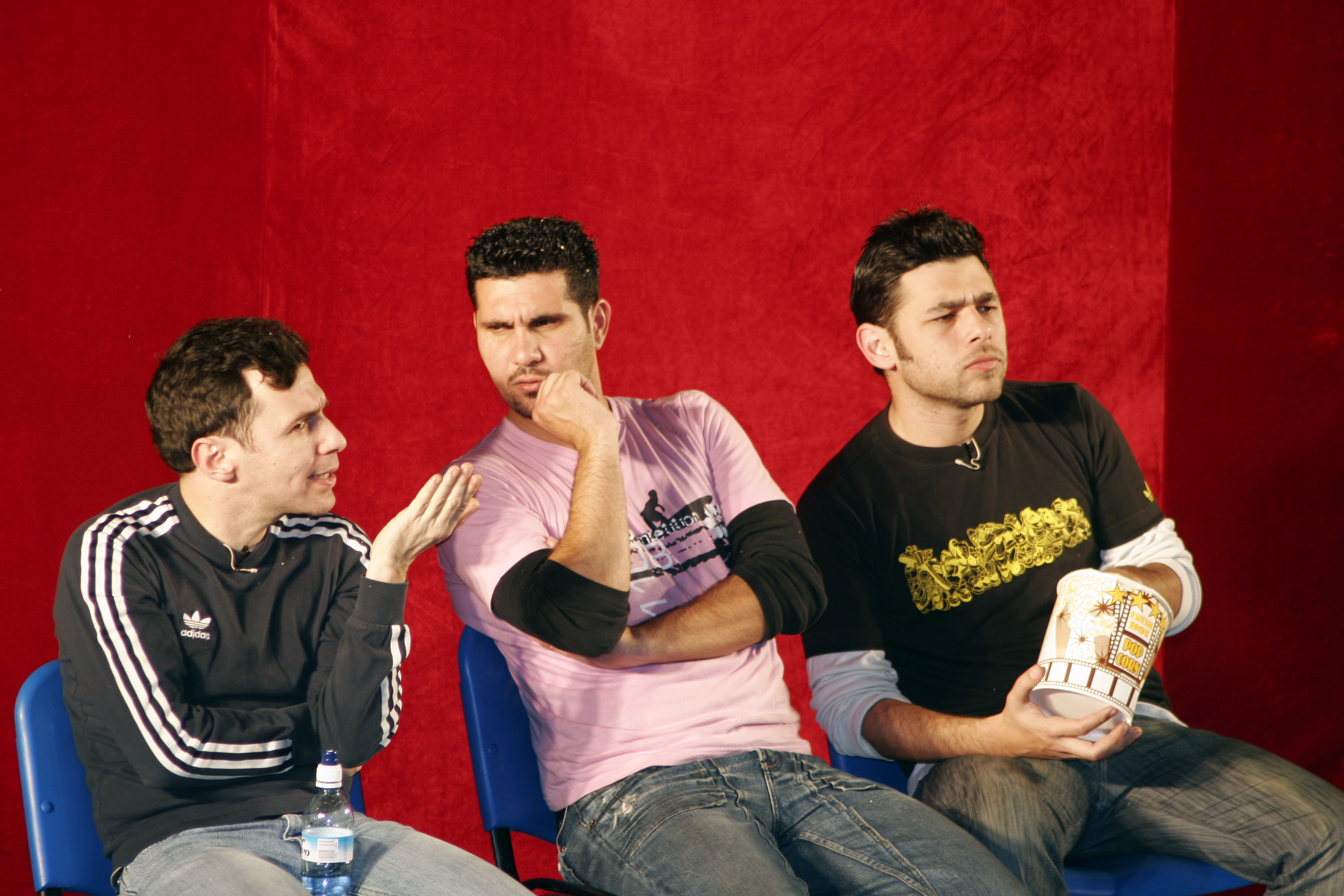
The Prozak Trio

In 2003 they won the "People of the Year" award in the field of entertainment granted by the Israeli Channel 2 National Network. The Trio performed in about 800 performances all over Israel, in the U.S.A and in military bases in front of Israeli soldiers. They also participated in various TV programs. In 2007 the Trio took some time off from their performances and turned in different professional directions. However, they still perform in the original line-up from time to time.

Ofir returned to his old love, Music, and started recording his own music. His first singles are: "Betoch Ha Atvut" (lit. Inside Sadness)' Eich at Ossa et Ze (lit. How Do You Do It) which was recorded in a video clip directed by the actor Lior Ashkenazi, and "Besheket" (lit. In Silence)

Ofir's lyrics incorporate personal experiences and feelings of the average Israeli youngster from growing up on a kibbutz, to being a soldier in the Israeli army and trying to survive the daily reality as a father, a husband and an Israeli citizen.

Ofir's music has its roots in the music of Israeli composers such as Shalom Hanoch and Shlomo Artzi and the American Rock bands and singers such as Incubus, Pearl Jam, Led Zeppelin, Guns N' Roses and Bob Dylan.

Lately Ofir has started directing video clips for other singers. Ofir performs in his own Rock Show playing with a band and singing his own songs and lyrics. He is about to release his debut album. The covers of the singles and the album are original photographic artworks by Efrat Lobel.

Ofir is married to Anat, a Classical Homeopathy practitioner; presently they have one son, Jonathan, born February 2005. When he is not writing, singing or playing, Ofir enjoys painting.
