= Yehuda Levi =

Israeli actor and male model (born 1979)

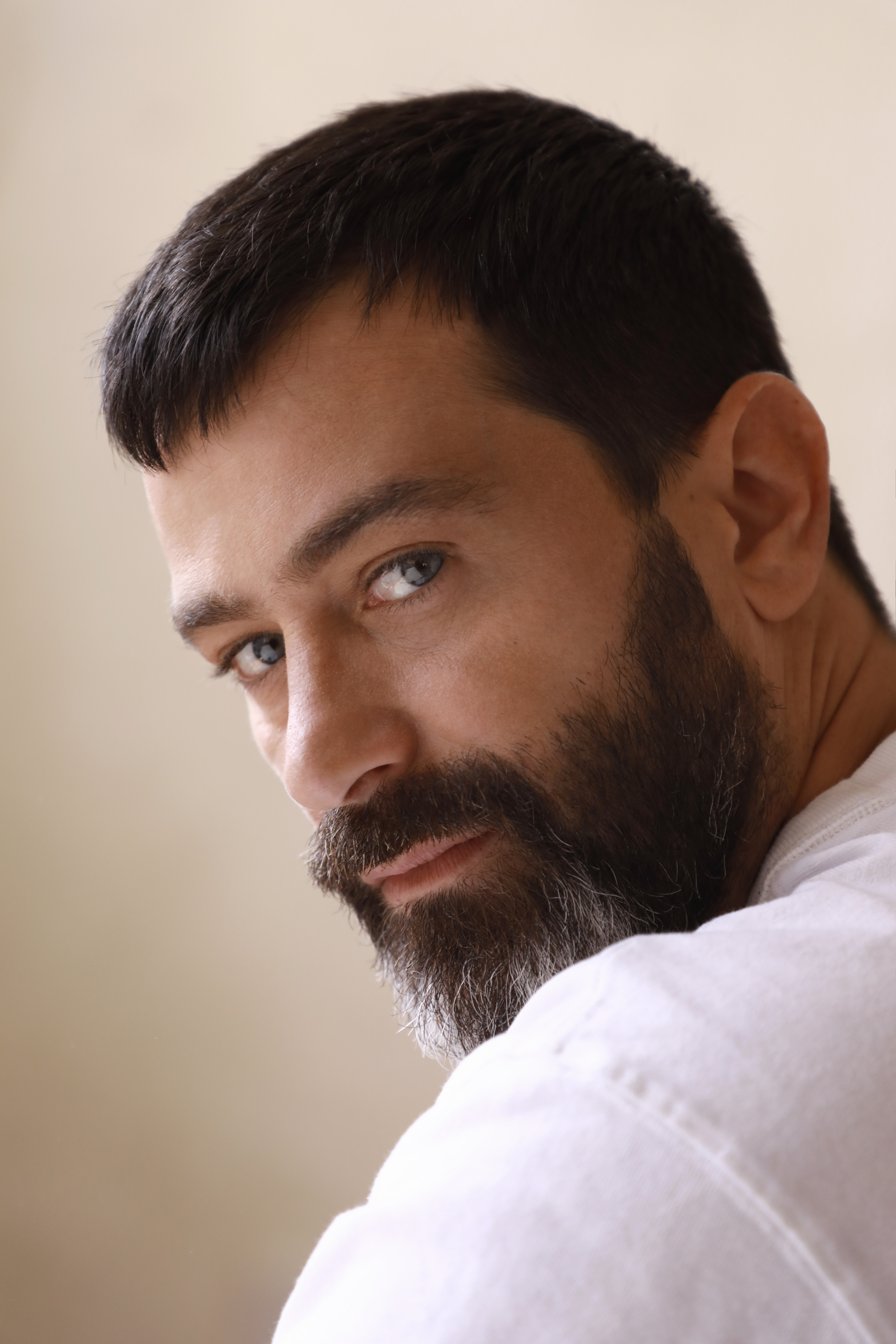
- Levi in 2022
- Born: June 29, 1979 (age 47); Petah Tikva, Israel
- Occupations: Actor, model, singer, TV host
- Spouse: Shlomit Malka (m. 2017; div. 2021)

Yehuda Levi (Hebrew: יהודה לוי; born June 29, 1979) is an Israeli actor, model and television presenter, known for his work in film, television and theatre. He has received numerous accolades, including three Best Actor awards from the Israeli Academy of Television for his performances in Yossi & Jagger (2002) and Very Important Person (2014–2019).

He starred as Nadav Feldman in the Israeli crime series, The Arbitrator (2007–2014). He also starred in the Israeli television action drama series, Mossad 101 (2015–2017), the Haredi drama series, Fire Dance (2022) and A Body That Works (2023–present). Since 2023 he has hosted HaMerotz LaMillion, the Israeli version of The Amazing Race.

== Early life ==
Levi was born in Petah Tikva, Israel. His father Yerachmiel Levi was born in Bulgaria and his mother Chaya (née Lichtenstein) was born in Poland. At age four, their family moved to South Africa where his father worked at the time; a decade later, at age fourteen, they moved back to Israel. In South Africa he trained in karate, winning the national children's championship at age ten. After returning to Israel he joined a youth theatre troupe and later attended the Thelma Yellin High School of the Arts in Givatayim. His uncle is choreographer and former Israel Football Association chairman Gavri Levy, and his cousin is former footballer Guy Levy.

During his Israel Defense Forces service, he was a commander of the military band of the Education Corps.

== Career ==
He is an established actor, and came to the attention of the Israeli public through his soap opera roles, beginning with the 2001 telenovela Lechayey Ha'ahava; he won the Golden Screen award for best actor in a daily series for his roles in Lechayey Ha'ahava and Ahava Me'ever Lapina. In 2002, he starred as a gay soldier in the Eytan Fox film, Yossi & Jagger. The film initially premiered on Israeli television and Levi won the Best Actor award from the Israeli Academy of Television.

In May 2006, HaAlufa (The Champion), a soap opera centered on a soccer team, premiered starring Levi as the main character and captain of the team "Hakoakh Yerushalayim" (Jerusalem Power).

In 2014 he began playing a famous celebrity called Yehuda Levi in the Hot TV series Very Important Person. He won two Best Actor awards from the Israeli Academy of Television for his performance in the role, the second in 2019 for the series' second season.

He also played the lead role as a Mossad trainer in the Channel 2 series, Mossad 101 that began airing in 2015. In 2022, he starred as a Haredi rabbi in Rama Burshtein's television drama series, Fire Dance. For the role, he was awarded the Best Actor award for an international series at Series Mania in France in 2022.

A year later, he starred alongside Rotem Sela in the Israeli surrogacy drama series A Body That Works, which had its world premiere at Series Mania in 2023. The series was Israel's highest rated drama of 2023.

In January 2025, he starred as Itamar Molcho, the head of the Shin Bet, in the Keshet 12 drama HaRosh (The Head), which Netflix acquired for international release as Trust No One. In October 2026, he starred in the Keshet 12 thriller HaBricha (The Escape), originally announced as HaBricha HaGdola, as a former senior security official who tries to rescue a group of young people from a cult in the jungles of Colombia. Reviews were mixed: Makor Rishon's reviewers called it promising and compared it favourably with HBO productions, while Time Out Tel Aviv praised the cast and direction but called Levi's storyline unnecessary. Its first episodes averaged a 17.1% rating, the highest for an Israeli drama in 2026 up to that point.

=== Additional work ===
He was the spokesmodel of Israeli fashion brands Fox and Renuar.

On 12 March 2023, Levi was announced as the new host of HaMerotz LaMillion, Israel's version of The Amazing Race, replacing longtime host Ron Shahar.

== Personal life ==
Levi was previously in a relationship with the Israeli model Yael Bar Zohar and acted alongside her in the soap opera, Ramat Aviv Gimel. In 2006, Levi got into a high-profile relationship with Israeli singer and actress Ninet Tayeb, the first winner of the show Kokhav Nolad. Haaretz described them as "Israel's favourite celebrity couple", with The Jerusalem Post declaring them "Israel's Brangelina". In 2013, after 8 years together, the couple broke up, stating that the breakup was mutual. He has been described as one of the two most talked-about male stars in Israel (along with Ran Danker), Tayeb's former partner.

In 2017, he married Israeli model Shlomit Malka. They resided in Tel Aviv. On June 6, 2021, the couple announced that they had separated. Levi is in a relationship with actress Dana Frieder; their daughter was born in March 2026.

== Theater ==
- 1993: David
- 1995: Carmen
- 2004: Tarzan and Jane – Tarzan
- 2008: Joseph and the Amazing Technicolor Dreamcoat – Joseph

== Filmography ==
=== Film ===
| Year | Title | Role | Notes |
|---|---|---|---|
| 1996 | Zolgot Hadma'ot Me'atzman (Tears Fall by Themselves) | Car-hit boy | |
| 2002 | Yossi & Jagger | Lior Amichai (Jagger) | |
| 2004 | Campfire | Yoel | |
| 2005 | Munich | IDF soldier | Minor role |
| 2006 | Schwartz Dynasty | Avishai | Co-star |
| 2011 | For the Love of Money | Isaac | |
| 2013 | Wonderland | Rabbi Shmaya Knafo | |

=== Television ===
| Year | Title | Role | Notes |
|---|---|---|---|
| 1996 | Ramat Aviv Gimmel (Season 2) | Gil | Episode 21 |
| 2001 | Lechayey Ha'ahava | Gidi Meiri | |
| 2003–2005 | Ahava Me'ever Lapina | Lior Dvir | |
| 2006–2009 | The Champion | Saar Fedida | Lead role |
| 2007–2013 | The Arbitrator | Nadav Feldman | |
| 2010 | Hasamba Third Generation | Freddie Zorkin | |
| 2011 | Eretz Nehederet (Season 8) | Yaniv Biton | Episode 14 |
| 2012 | Mom and Dads | Sami Israel | Lead role |
| 2014 | Very Important Person | Yehuda Levi | Lead role |
| 2015 | Dig | Ali Lavey / Ari | Undercover; Shin Bet agent |
| 2015 | Mossad 101 | Yonna "Kinder" Harari | Lead role |
| 2017 | Shababnikim | Yehuda Levi | S1, episode 8 |
| 2022 | Fire Dance | Natan Shulman | Lead role |
| 2023 | A Body That Works | Ido Avrahami | Series regular |
| 2023 | East Side | Momi | Series regular |
| 2025 | HaRosh (Trust No One) | Itamar Molcho | Lead role; head of the Shin Bet |
| 2026 | HaBricha (The Escape) | | Lead role |

=== TV Presenter ===
| Year | Title | Role | Notes |
|---|---|---|---|
| 2023–present | HaMerotz LaMillion | Host | |

== Awards and nominations ==
| Year | Award | Category | Nominated work | Result | Ref. |
|---|---|---|---|---|---|
| 2003 | Dallas OUT TAKES | Best Actor | Yossi & Jagger | Won | |
| 2003 | Israeli Film Academy | Best Acting in a Drama, Miniseries or Television Movie | Yossi & Jagger | Won | |
| 2004 | Israeli Film Academy | Best Supporting Actor | Schwartz Dynasty | Nominated | |
| 2013 | Israeli Television Academy | Best Actor in a Drama Series | Mom and Dads | Nominated | |
| 2014 | Israeli Television Academy | Best Actor in a Drama Series | Very Important Person | Won | |
| 2019 | Israeli Television Academy | Best Actor in a Drama Series | Very Important Person (season 2) | Won | |

== See also ==
- List of Israeli actors
