= Zohar Strauss =

Israeli actor (born 1972)

- זהר שטראוס
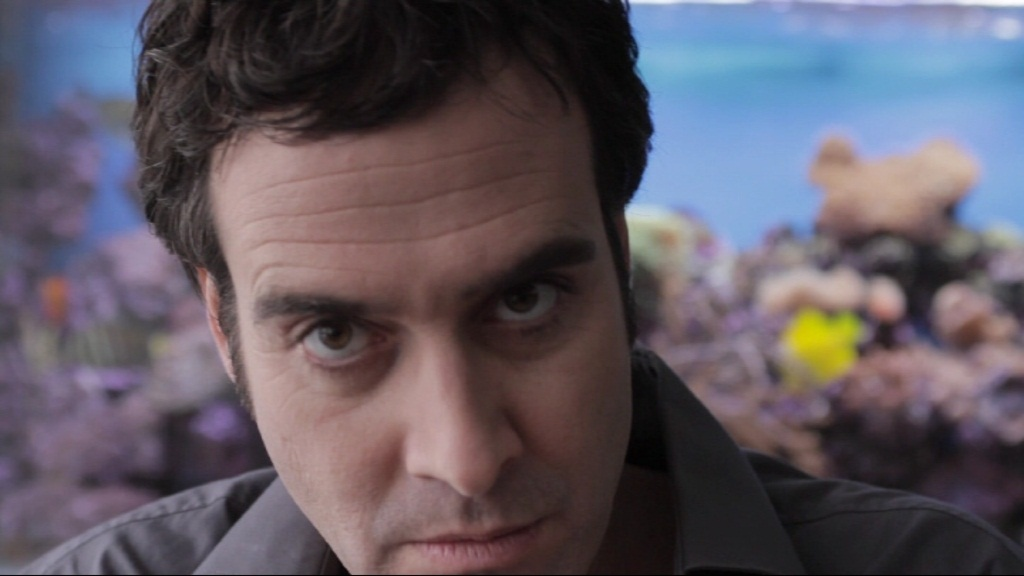
- Born: March 4, 1972 (age 54); Haifa, Israel
- Occupation: Actor

Zohar Zalman Strauss (Hebrew: זהר זלמן שטראוס; born 4 March 1972) is an Israeli theater, film, and television actor. Regarded as one of the best performers of his generation in Israel, he is recognized for his versatile work across independent films, television and the stage. He has received numerous accolades, including one Ophir Award and two nominations.

A graduate of the University of Leicester and the Yoram Loewenstein Performing Arts Studio, he has appeared in popular television dramas such as Srugim and Shtisel (2013 - 2021). He has also had roles in critically-acclaimed films such as Beaufort (2007), Lebanon (2009), Eyes Wide Open (2009) and The Cakemaker (2017).

== Early life ==
Strauss was born in Haifa, Israel, to a secular Jewish family of Ashkenazi Jewish descent. His mother is a mathematics teacher and his father is a doctor of physics.

During his service in the Israel Defense Forces, Strauss was an instructor in the Medical Corps.

He studied a Bachelor's Degree in Law at the University of Leicester in England. He later studied at Yoram Loewenstein Performing Arts Studio in Tel Aviv.

== Career ==
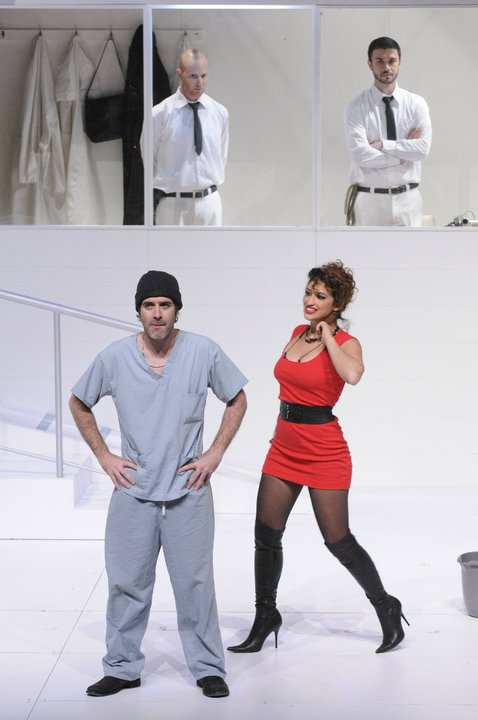
Strauss (front, left) as McMurphy in One Flew Over the Cuckoo's Nest, 2012.

In 2009, Strauss starred as a closeted Haredi husband and father that engages in an affair with a younger Haredi man (Ran Danker) in Eyes Wide Open. He won the Award for Best Actor in the 2009 Jerusalem Film Festival for his role. The jury commended the film for its “sensitive and original treatment of male desire in the ultra-Orthodox world.”

In the same year he won an Ophir Award for Best Supporting Actor for his performance in the film Lebanon. He was nominated for the same prize in 2006 and 2012, in recognition of his roles in Things Behind the Sun and Magic Men. He also won the ASSITEJ-Israel Award for Best Actor for the 2009/10 theater season.

He debuted on the stage of the Herzliya Ensemble Theater and also performed in Habima Theatre. He won praise in 2010, when the Be'er Sheva Theater's staging of One Flew Over the Cuckoo's Nest, at which he portrayed Randle McMurphy, won the Israel Theater Award. He also appeared in a variety of film and television productions, including Beaufort, Jellyfish, Kirot, Srugim, and Zaguri Imperia.

Strauss portrayed ultra-Orthodox husband, father, gentle-spirit, and conflicted soul Lippe Weiss in the award-winning Israeli drama Shtisel, which is available in the United States on Netflix. The series premiered in 2013, with the third season broadcast in 2021.

In 2018, Strauss appeared as John the Apostle alongside Rooney Mara and Joaquin Phoenix in Mary Magdalene.

In 2024, he appeared as Amir Levy, ex-husband of Amalia (Ayelet Zurer) in the acclaimed television drama, The Best Worst Thing on Keshet 12.

== Selected filmography ==
Film
Year	Title	Role	Notes
2007	Beaufort	Rossman	
2009	Eyes Wide Open	Aaron Fleischman	
2009	Lebanon	Gamil	
2009	Kirot	Elinor's husband	
2012	Urban Tale	Teacher's husband	
2014	Magic Men	Yehuda Kofinas	
2015	A Grain of Truth	Rabbi Zygmunt	Polish film
2017	The Cakemaker	Moti	
2018	Mary Magdalene	John	
2024	Soda	Asher	

Television
Year	Title	Role	Notes
2008	Srugim	Dr. Avri Sagiv	Recurring role
2013 - 2021	Shtisel	Lippe Weiss	Series regular
2017	Shababnikim	Ehud Stern	
2018 - 2021	PMTA	Mordoch	Series regular
2024	The Best Worst Thing	Amir Levy	Series regular
