= Wounded Land (film) =

2015 film

- Film poster
- ארץ פצועה
- Directed by: Erez Tadmor
- Written by: Erez Tadmor
- Starring: Dvir Benedek, Roei Assaf
- Release date: 13 July 2015
- Running time: 80 minutes
- Country: Israel
- Language: Hebrew

Wounded Land (Hebrew: ארץ פצועה) is a 2015 Israeli drama film directed by Erez Tadmor. It was nominated for Best Film at the 2015 Ophir Awards and won three nominations: the best director award (Tadmor), the best actor award (Roie Assaf) and the make-up award.

== Cast ==
Actor Name	Character Name	Comments
Roei Assaf	Kobi Amar	Police Officer
Dvir Benedek	Yehuda Noiman	Police Officer
Yoav Bar-Lev	Tzaiger	Police station Commander
Moshe Ashkenazi	Ofer Mashiach	Policeman
Yoav Levi	Bushri	Policeman
Keren Berger	Orit	Nurse
Karmit Mesilati	Nurit Noiman	
Sharon Tal	Tamar Amar	
Itai Sacherberg	Aviv Amar	
Hisham Sulliman	Dr. Sulliman	Surgeon
Miki Leon		Surgeon
Makram Khoury	Dr. Baader	Deputy Director of hospital
Tawfeek Barhom		Terrorist
Eyal Rozales	Benny Sasson	Worried father
Eyal Salame	Avner	Criminal
Didi Lokov		

== Plot ==
Kobi Amar (Roei Assaf) is a junior police officer at the Haifa police department. His commanding officer is Yehuda Noiman (Dvir Benedek). The two families, Amar and Noiman, are friendly. Kobi's son Aviv (Itai Sacherberg) and Yehuda's son participate in the same Judo class.

Noiman is building a villa on Mount Carmel using funds received from cooperation with criminals dealing in stolen goods. Tzaiger (Yoav Bar-Lev), the station commander, tasks Kobi to record Noiman, thereby incriminating him in the wrong doings. Kobi reluctantly agrees.
