= Erez Tadmor =

Israeli film director and screenwriter

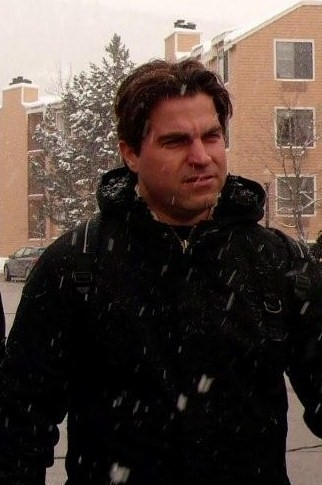
Erez Tadmor, 2008

Erez Tadmor (Hebrew: ארז תדמור; born January 18, 1974) is an Israeli film director and screenwriter. He is a winner of the Ophir Award and has been nominated for several more.

== Selected filmography ==
- 2001: Mosh (Hebrew: מוש)
- 2004: Strangers, a short later made into the 2007 full feature
  2004 Sundance Film Festival winner, Audience Award, Short Filmmaking
- 2005: All Is Well by Me, documentary about the popular Israeli singer Josie Katz
- 2006: אופסייד ("Offside"): two Israeli reservists on patrol and two armed Palestinians stand in front of each other separated by the Gaza–Israel barrier, but a transistor radio broadcasting the soccer world cup final match unites them for some time
- 2007: Strangers
- 2009: A Matter of Size
- 2014: Magic Men
  An Israeli magician, a Holocaust survivor, travel to his native Greece to find a man who saved him. He has to go with his son, a devoted Hasidic rapper, with whom he had severed the ties, and they quarrel during the whole trip. The English title refers to an episode when they both had to make a street performance to get some live cash for a cash-only gas station.
- 2015: Wounded Land
- 2016: Home Port
  "Director Erez Tadmor creates a taut drama about modern working conditions, the sinister nature of privatisation and the way in which ideology can tear even the closest relationships apart."
- 2019: The Art of Waiting; Hebrew: Beshurot tovot, literally "Good Tidings"
  An Israeli couple want to have a child, but have a trouble with fertility, which puts their relationship to test.
- 2022: Matchmaking (The Israeli title Bachurim Tovim literally means "Good Guys")
  A romantic comedy-drama film around shidduch, an Orthodox Jewish tradition of matchmaking
- 2023: Children of Nobody (Hebrew: ילדים של אף אחד, romanized: Yeladim Shel Af Ehad), a film on the challenges faced by inmates of a shelter for at-risk youths
- 2024: Matchmaking 2
- 2024: Soda: based on the story of Tadmor's grandfather, a Jewish partisan during the Second World War and his subsequent post-war life in Israel.

== Awards ==
- 2001: His first short film, "Mosh" (Hebrew: מוש) won several international awards
- 2006: Short Film Award at Manhattan Film Festival for אופסייד (Offside))
- 2009: Právo Audience Award at the 44th Karlovy Vary International Film Festival for A Matter of Size and some other awards
- 2015: Ophir Award for best directing for Wounded Land
- 2023: Children of Nobody (ילדים של אף אחד): Golden Royal Bengal Tiger Award for the best film at the 29th Kolkata International Film Festival
