= Rona-Lee Shimon =

Israeli actress, model (born 1983)

- רונה לי שמעון
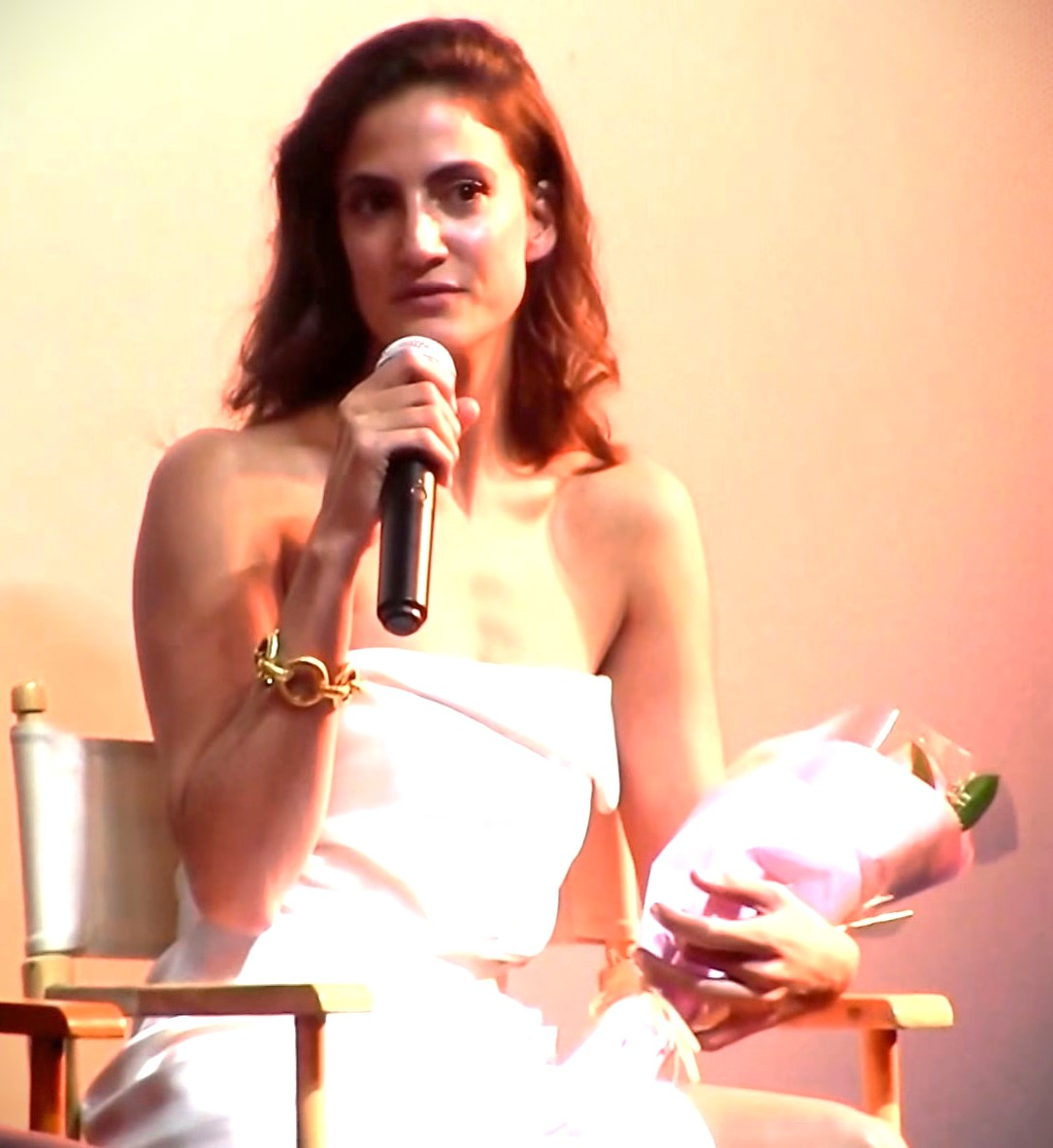
- Shim'on in 2017 at Los Angeles Fauda panel
- Born: 9 January 1981 (age 45); Ramat Gan, Israel
- Other name: Rona-Lee
- Occupations: Actress; model; dancer
- Years active: 2006–present
- Known for: Fauda
- Height: 1.76 m (5 ft 9 in)
- Children: 1

Rona-Lee Shimon (also Shim'on; Hebrew: רונה לי שמעון; born 9 January 1981), also sometimes credited mononymously as Rona-Lee, is an Israeli actress, dancer and model. She is best known primarily for her leading role as Nurit in Fauda.

== Early life ==
Shim'on attended theatre school for three years.

== Career ==
In 2005, Shim'on was a contestant on the Israeli version of So You Think You Can Dance, called Born to Dance (Hebrew: נולד לרקוד). In 2006, she made her acting debut, appearing as Shiri Gold in Ha'Shir Shelanu (Our Song) (השיר שלנו), a musical Israeli soap opera.

Shim'on has also featured as model for various brands, magazines and commercials.

Shim'on was a judge on Israel's Rokdim Im Kokhavim (Dancing with the Stars).

She is known primarily for her leading role in Fauda. Her character, Nurit, is the only woman in an Israeli counter-terrorism unit. She performed her own stunts.

In 2020, she appeared as Mika in Messiah. In 2025, she played Mossad agent Eliza in The Terminal List: Dark Wolf.

== Personal life ==
In July 2025, Shim'on gave birth to a son, Oli.

== Filmography ==
=== Films ===
Film roles
Year	Title	Role	Notes	Ref.
2010	Infiltration			
2011	Policeman	Hila		
2012	Leak		Short film	
2016	A Quiet Heart			
2024	French	Sari	Short film	
2024	Dirty Angels	Rocky		

=== TV series ===
Television roles
Year	Title	Role	Notes	Ref.
2005	Born to Dance	Contestant	credited as Rona-Lee	
2006–2007	Ha'Shir Shelanu (Our Song)	Shiri Gold	Main role, credited as Rona-Lee	
2006	HaPijamot	Young Woman	Episode: "Tzofen Ha-Pijamot"	
2007	Ha'Nephilim	Virtual Waitress	Episode: "Tag Adom", credited as Rona-Lee	
2012	Summer Break Diaries	Mika	2 episodes	
2015–present	Fauda	Nurit	Main cast	
2020	Messiah	Mika Dahan	Recurring role	
2021	Alumim	Meital	Recurring role	
2025	The Terminal List: Dark Wolf	Eliza Perash	Recurring role	

=== Theatre ===
Year	Title	Role	Notes	Ref.
2011	Death Valley	Valerie	The Studio for Theater Arts	
