= List of Fauda episodes =

Fauda (Hebrew: פאודה, from Arabic: فوضى fawḍā, meaning "chaos" or "mess") is an Israeli television series developed by Lior Raz and Avi Issacharoff drawing on their experiences in the Israel Defense Forces (IDF). It tells the story of Doron, a commander in the Mista'arvim unit and his team. The series is distributed in Israel by the yes satellite network and internationally by Netflix.

As of 2026, Fauda consists of a total of five seasons, 59 episodes.

== Series overview ==
Series	Episodes	Originally released	
Series	Episodes	First released	Last released
1	12	15 February 2015	3 May 2015
2	12	31 December 2017	18 March 2018
3	12	26 December 2019	12 March 2020
4	12	13 July 2022	28 September 2022
5	11	18 May 2026	9 July 2026

== Episodes ==
=== Season 1 ===
No. overall	No. in season	Title	Directed by	Written by	Original release date
1	1	"Episode 1.01"	Assaf Bernstein	Moshe Zonder	15 February 2015
Doron is brought back into the IDF after discovering that Taufiq, the man he thought he killed 18 months earlier, was still alive and planning on attending his brother Bashir's wedding. Ultimately they are discovered and Bashir is killed, moments before Taufiq is to arrive. Although Doron is able to shoot Taufiq after recognizing him and chasing him, Taufiq is able to escape.
2	2	"Episode 1.02"	Assaf Bernstein	Moshe Zonder	22 February 2015
Taufiq is shown to have survived the gun shot wound, but barely, and is forced to have secret emergency surgery as to not reveal that he is alive or where he is. Doron is able to convince Moreno to allow him to stay on beyond his one mission, until they catch Taufiq, while Doron is revealed to have marital issues at home. Bashir's family all mourns him as a Shahid (martyr), while his wife, Amal, vows revenge.
3	3	"Episode 1.03"	Assaf Bernstein	Moshe Zonder	1 March 2015
Shirin helps Taufiq escape from the hospital minutes before Doron's team arrives to attack him. Amal gets assigned to blow up a night club that Boaz frequents, to send a message that it is revenge for Bashir's killing, however Amal decides to not leave and stay with the bomb.
4	4	"Episode 1.04"	Assaf Bernstein	Moshe Zonder	8 March 2015
Boaz wakes up following the blast at the night club and finds his girlfriends body, causing him to ultimately be arrested for driving his motorcycle drunk and beating up a cop. Taufiq wants a safe house in order to see his wife. Doron convinces Shirin to go on a date with him, but he leaves early to try and hunt down Taufiq. The team just missed Taufiq, and Nurit winds up killing an Arab woman that attempts to stab her.
5	5	"Episode 1.05"	Assaf Bernstein	Moshe Zonder	15 March 2015
Moreno comes in to check on Nurit and they wind up having sex. Gali is revealed to be having an affair with a member of Doron's unit. Ali, a senior member of Hamas, is being interrogated by Israel as he was supposed to provide information on Taufiq in exchange for surgery on his daughter. Ali eventually leads Doron's unit to a meeting he has with Taufiq, but they kill Ali, before the team gets there, and Boaz gets captured while separated from the team.
6	6	"Episode 1.06"	Assaf Bernstein	Moshe Zonder	22 March 2015
Boaz attempts to make his capturers believe he is Muslim, which works until Taufiq recognizes his tattoo as the man who killed Bashir. Doron and his team decide to prepare an unapproved mission to kidnap Sheikh Awadalla, in an attempt to get Boaz back.
7	7	"Episode 1.07"	Assaf Bernstein	Moshe Zonder	29 March 2015
Shirin performs surgery on Boaz, and Taufiq tells him he took his kidney in order to give it to Ali Karmi's daughter. Sheikh Awadalla caves under the pressure of interrogations and gives up Taufiq's location, however he had already moved. Doron gets Shirin to admit that she did not in fact take Boaz's kidney, but implanted something electronic inside of him. Doron announces they will instead move on to Plan B, where they kidnap Taufiq's daughter Abir. At the prisoner exchange, Walid is instructed to release Boaz without detonating the bomb or else he will blow up Abir and Sheikh, however Taufiq gives the orders to blow the bomb anyway.
8	8	"Episode 1.08"	Assaf Bernstein	Moshe Zonder	5 April 2015
After seeing Boaz explode, Doron orders that Sheikh's bomb be detonated as well, then flees off the road. Moreno tells Steve and Avihai that they are no longer with the unit and that Doron will be prosecuted by the courts, while Moreno offers Nurit a promotion which she rejects. Nassrin is forced to allow an Israeli doctor to operate on Abir's eye although she wishes to transfer her to Ramallah for the surgery instead. Moreno visits Gideon Avital to find out that he too has been discharged due to the issues, and the entire unit would be disbanded. Doron is shown wandering around Arab neighborhoods and ultimately takes shelter in a mosque.
9	9	"Episode 1.09"	Assaf Bernstein	Moshe Zonder	12 April 2015
Doron shows up at Shirin's apartment after wandering the streets injured, and after she treats his wounds, he kisses her. Moreno blackmails Avital into reinstating him and the unit. Taufiq puts a kill order on Shirin for betraying them, but Doron is there and kills the men that were sent. Doron poses as a potential shahid to try to become part of Taufiq's plan. Following his meeting, Doron is captured by a member of the Palestinian Preventative Services to attempt to discover his plan.
10	10	"Episode 1.10"	Assaf Bernstein	Moshe Zonder	19 April 2015
Gabi shows up to release Doron, and bring him back to Israel. Taufiq sends Walid to kill Shirin, but instead he asks her to marry him. Nassrin informs Taufiq that she can't take any more and intends to go home to Berlin and take their children with her. Doron is transferred to Israel where he awaits trial, but Gabi tries to convince Gideon Avital to allow Doron to finish his mission before facing trial.
11	11	"Episode 1.11"	Assaf Bernstein	Moshe Zonder	26 April 2015
Abu Halil is grabbed off the streets and winds up being interrogated by Gabi, where he reveals he brought sarin nerve gas, via Jordan from Syria. Gabi uses this information to convince Gideon to allow Doron to fulfill his mission in exchange for a full pardon. Gabi presents Nassrin with their passports and informs her that he has arranged for their travel to Berlin. Doron returns home to find Ido pointing a gun at Naor, blaming him for the reason his father is not there. Shirin reluctantly agrees to marry Walid, but sleeps with Doron after he walks out of his house. Taufiq reveals his plan to Walid, that the sarin nerve gas will be detonated in the synagogue, which will cause Israel to retaliate with force, committing war crimes, which will force the other Islamic states to respond.
12	12	"Episode 1.12"	Assaf Bernstein	Moshe Zonder	3 May 2015
Walid watches the suicide vest being assembled while Doron and his team review their plan. Doron is brought to the secret location and fit with the suicide vest. While Doron is prepped for the missions Walid goes to see Shirin where she tells him they cannot get married. Walid, assuming its due to Amir, goes to the Palestinian Preventive Security office to confront him, only to find out Amir is really Doron, and they have recruited a Jewish spy. Walid phones back to alert the people prepping Doron that he is a spy, so they ditch his stuff into the back of a pick up truck, which the team winds up following. Just as they are about to shoot Doron, the team returns and kills all of the Hamas men there. Walid returns to Taufiq's hide out, shows him the proof on Doron, then shoots Taufiq in the head from behind. Walid sends the proof of who Doron really is to Shirin, and she walks out on Doron mid-date.

=== Season 2 ===
No. overall	No. in season	Title	Directed by	Written by	Original release date
13	1	"Episode 2.01"	Rotem Shamir	Amir Mann	31 December 2017
Having taken charge of Taufiq's Hamas cell, Walid Al-Abed and Nidal Awadallah, the son of the sheik, engineer a suicide bombing in an urban location that results in several fatalities. Following the events of the first season, Doron has separated from his wife Gali, who has a new boyfriend, but he is allowed to visit their children. He lives with his father Amos Kabilio and they are ambushed on the road. Doron finds out Nidal is seeking revenge for the death of his father. Shin Bet agent Gabi brings back Doron into active service to hunt down Nidal, but the pursuit kills Mista'arvim commander Mickey Moreno. Walid also discreetly visits his cousin Shirin whom he has married.
14	2	"Episode 2.02"	Rotem Shamir	Amir Mann	7 January 2018
Gabi Ayub visits Abu Maher, the head of the Palestinian Preventive Security, to seek his assistance in hunting Walid Al-Abed and his operatives. Walid surreptitiously visits Shirin in hospital before she is arrested by Israeli soldiers. Meanwhile, Doron and his comrades gather at the home of Moreno's family to pay respects to their fallen comrade. Tensions are high within Doron's squad, with a boxing exercise ending in acrimony. The new unit commander Eli warns Doron to make amends or leave the squad. Elsewhere, Walid and Nidal meet with Abu Samara, the leader of Hamas in the West Bank. Abu warns Nidal not to launch further unauthorised attacks. Defying Abu's orders, Nidal assembles a squad of Hebrew-speaking Palestinian teenagers including Maher's son Maher Muhammad Imas Asheikh for a new mission. Later, Doron manages to convince Shirin to cooperate in return for flying her to France and proposing a relationship. With Shirin's help, Doron's team captures Samir, Nidal’s brother.
15	3	"Episode 2.03"	Rotem Shamir	Amir Mann	14 January 2018
Nidal's team of infiltrators enters Israel disguised as Israeli Jews. He continues to defy Walid, who attempts to assert his authority. Meanwhile, Ayub threatens a defiant Samir in Israeli custody. He also uses Samir's phone to threaten his wife and his mother. Doron meets up with Amos, who discloses that he spent three weeks in a Jordanian prison following a botched undercover mission but had told a young Doron he was on holiday in Greece. Eli discovers that Walid is secretly visiting Shirin disguised as an elderly woman. He assigns Doron and two other squad members with planting a hidden video camera inside her house. During the mission, Doron goes rogue and offers to help Shirin to find a way out of her predicament, giving her a special code to contact him.
16	4	"Episode 2.04"	Rotem Shamir	Amir Mann	21 January 2018
Nidal and his squad of Hebrew-speaking Palestinian infiltrators' car experiences a breakdown. When an Israeli police officer investigates, Bilal kills him before being shot dead by Israeli soldiers. Nidal and the others including Asheikh escape. The incident draws the attention of Israeli security forces including Doron's squad. Abu Samara rebukes Nidal and his squad for defying orders by instigating conflict with the Israelis and denies them Hamas's support. Meanwhile, Doron descends into paranoia, clashing with his wife Gali and commander Eli. Doron discloses his contact with Shirin to Gabi, who takes over the operation. Doron discreetly meets with Shirin at her workplace.
17	5	"Episode 2.05"	Rotem Shamir	Amir Mann	28 January 2018
Nidal intimidates Doron by visiting his son Ido. In response, Doron gets Gabi to provide his family and Gali's boyfriend with round-the-clock security. Doron and his team also retaliate by intimidating the newly-released Samir and his pregnant wife Marwan. In response, Samir goes underground and reestablishes contact with Walid. With Doron believing Shirin is in danger, Eli sends the team to Ramallah to extract Shirin. However, Shirin is picked up by Walid and his associates, who are aware of her contact with Doron.
18	6	"Episode 2.06"	Rotem Shamir	Amir Mann	4 February 2018
Doron and the team rescue Shirin and capture Walid. Doron brings Shirin to his home. He initiates an affair with Shirin and also introduces her to his father. Meanwhile, a defiant Walid refuses to crack under Israeli interrogation. When he threatens vengeance on Gabi and his family, Gabi assaults him and orders that he be placed in a stress position. Elsewhere, Samir joins Nidal in his safe house, who recruits him into his team. Asheikh returns to Ramallah where he is confronted by his father Maher, who is unaware of his son's terror activities.
19	7	"Episode 2.07"	Rotem Shamir	Amir Mann	11 April 2018
Walid befriends a Gazan prisoner named Ahmad Shasmana, who is really Naor. The two encourage each other while being interrogated by their Israeli captors. Doron and his squad capture Abu Samara, the Hamas leader in the West Bank. Gabi blackmails Abu into contacting Nidal and appointing him to take over for Walid. Following a failed attempt by Doron's squad to capture Nidal in Nablus, Nidal releases a video proclaiming himself as the leader of a new ISIS cell in the West Bank.
20	8	"Episode 2.08"	Rotem Shamir	Amir Mann	18 April 2018
Doron continues his romantic relationship with Shirin, while they wait for her travel outside the country to be arranged. In Ramallah, Maher suspects his son Asheikh his hiding something and takes him on a road trip to Haifa. Unaware of Asheikh's involvement with ISIS, he advises his son about the need to work with the Israelis to ensure peace for the Palestinians. Gabi tries to break Walid by revealing that Shirin is pregnant but he remains defiant. Walid discovers Ahmad is a spy working for the Israelis and the two fight. Nidal captures Doron's father Amos and films his execution. The episode is dedicated to Aaron Aviram, Noah Mordechai Issacharoff and Moshe Turgeman.
21	9	"Episode 2.09"	Rotem Shamir	Amir Mann	25 April 2018
Doron reacts with grief and anguish to the murder of his father Amos. He blames Shirin, who is interrogated and detained by Israeli security forces. Doron seeks consolation from his colleagues and estranged wife. Shirin is put in an interrogation room with Walid, who condemns her as a traitor to the Palestinian people. After Gabi reneges on his promise to fly her overseas, a distraught Shirin commits suicide by hanging herself. Doron arrives and tries in vain to revive her.
22	10	"Episode 2.10"	Rotem Shamir	Amir Mann	4 May 2018
Doron reacts with grief and regret to the death of Shirin. His boss Gabi and his colleagues console him. Doron's ex-wife Gali also comforts him and allows him to spend time with their children. During a surveillance sweep, Abu Maher discovers his son Maher Muhammad Imas Asheikh's listening device and contacts Gabi. Nidal activates his squad of infiltrators, who prepare to launch their attack on Israeli territory. By tapping into their communications, Israeli intelligence learn that Nidal is planning to visit a barber shop.
23	11	"Episode 2.11"	Rotem Shamir	Amir Mann	11 May 2018
Doron and his team attempt to capture Nidal at the barber shop but the mission goes awry. Nurit and Eli are almost lynched by angry Palestinians, forcing Doron to abandon his pursuit. Nidal's younger brother Samir is killed during the mission, which strains Nidal's relations with his mother and Samir's wife Marwan. Samir's mother is furious with Hamas for exploiting her son's death for political purposes. Nidal proposes to Marwan but she rebuffs his advances, condemning him for getting Samir killed. Abu Maher hands his son Maher Muhammad Imas Asheikh over to Gabi, who hands him over to the Jordanians for interrogation.
24	12	"Episode 2.12"	Rotem Shamir	Amir Mann	18 May 2018
Seeking vengeance against Doron for killing his father, Nidal kidnaps Doron and his son Ido. Nidal intends to force Doron to read a filmed confession before executing him. Gabi and the Israeli authorities interrogate Marwan, who gives a clue about Nidal's location in Nablus. While searching through an abandoned neighbourhood in Nablus, Eli and his team capture a young Palestinian boy, who divulges Nidal's location. Abu Samara confronts Nidal before he can execute Doron, leading to a gunfight that draws the attention of Israeli forces. Doron's comrades capture Nidal and free Doron and Ido. Doron stops his son from executing a wounded Nidal.

=== Season 3 ===
No. overall	No. in season	Title	Directed by	Written by	Original release date
25	1	"Episode 3.01"	Rotem Shamir	Noah Stallman	26 December 2019
A team of Hamas infiltrators led by Fauzi infiltrate Israel using the Gaza Strip smuggling tunnels. Meanwhile, Doron has become an undercover agent in ad-Dhahiriya under the pseudonym Abu Fadi, a boxing instructor for Bashar Hamdan, an aspiring young Palestinian boxer. Bashar is the son of Jihad Hamdan ("Abu Bashar"), who has been released from an Israeli prison after serving a 20-year sentence, and the cousin of Hamas militant Fauzi. Doron visits his wife and daughter at a family reception centre but is upset at not being able to see his son Ido. Using intelligence provided by Doron, Gabi and Eli disrupt a smuggling operation led by Fauzi, the cousin of Bashar. After learning about the Hamas infiltrators, Gabi tasks Doron with establishing contact with Fauzi. During the Hamdans' reunion party, Doron kills Ziad, who has become suspicious about a mole within their ranks. Later, Gabi meets with Abu Maher during a ceremony to hand over control of security functions to Palestinian security forces. However, they are attacked by Fauzi and his Hamas operatives, who assassinate Maher.
26	2	"Episode 3.02"	Rotem Shamir	Noah Stallman	2 January 2020
Gabi survives the Hamas attack but is hospitalised. Doron returns to Israel where he visits Gabi for a debriefing. Doron also meets Hila Bashan, the head of Shin Bet's Gaza operations, who briefs him about the Hamas infiltrators from Gaza. Doron manages to visit his daughter at his wife's home but Ido refuses to see his father. Meanwhile, Palestinian security forces search for "Abu Fadi" in connection with the death of Ziad. Fauzi finds Doron's phone and learns that he is an undercover Israeli spy. Doron attempts to use Bashar to lure Fauzi into an Israeli military trap. However, Bashar reveals Doron's true identity to a distraught Bashar, who confronts his mentor. Fauzi and his Hamas operatives arrive to apprehend Doron but are attacked by Eli and the other undercover Israeli soldiers. Fauzi is killed by Israeli forces while fleeing.
27	3	"Episode 3.03"	Rotem Shamir	Noah Stallman	9 January 2020
Bashar is ostracized by his family particularly his father Jihad Hamdan, who believe that he is a collaborator due to his relationship with Doron. Doron and Avihai take part in an Israeli military operation led by Eli to target a Hamas cell in Hebron. During the operation, Avihai accidentally kills an Israeli soldier during a friendly fire incident. A guilt-ridden Avihai goes on a work leave. Hani al-Jabari ("Abu Mohammed"), an old associate of Jihad Hamdan, meets with Hamdan and his family with the goal of capturing Doron. Bashar's sister Hayfa warns him that al-Jabari wants him to kill Doron. Bashar manages to evade al-Jabari's men and flee Hebron.
28	4	"Episode 3.04"	Rotem Shamir	Noah Stallman	16 January 2020
Hamdan joins his son Bashar on the run and evade Israeli authorities. The two men go into hiding and make contact with Hamdan's brother Uncle Nasser, who receives orders from al-Jabari to kill Doron. Meanwhile, Israeli soldiers raid the Hamdan family home and question his wife Noor Hamdan and daughter Hayfa. Doron promises Noor that he will bring Bashar home safely. Doron seeks Hila's help in tracking down Bashar. Under Nasser's instruction, Bashar contacts Doron via cellphone and arrange a meeting. Doron's colleagues Gabi and Hila suspect a trap and deploy backup. Nasser attempts to kill Doron with a suicide bomb but is killed by Steven. With their mission to assassinate Doron a failure, Jihad and Bashar return to Hebron to face al-Jabari, encountering two Israeli hikers in the wild.
29	5	"Episode 3.05"	Rotem Shamir	Noah Stallman	23 January 2020
Jihad and Bashar kidnap two Israeli hikers: a girl named Yaara and her boyfriend Elad. Jihad finds Abu Rami, a Palestinian Preventive Security policeman who was once a fellow inmate with Jihad. Abu and his wife reluctantly shelter them and their hostages. In response to the kidnapping, Israeli authorities launch a nationwide manhunt and interrogate the Hamdan's associates including Bashar's girlfriend Safaa and Jihad's fellow inmates. One inmate discloses information about Abu Rami, whom Gabi and his men interrogate. Doron, Steven and Anat converge on Rami's house but the father and son have escaped with their hostages. Jihad and Bashar take their hostages to a forest near Lehavim where they rendezvous with other Palestinian men. With Doron and the Israeli military in pursuit, the duo steal a van from an Israeli Arab man and take their hostages to Sderot, near the border with the Gaza Strip. Doron and his colleagues pursue Jihad, Bashar and their hostages through the tunnel network beneath Sderot.
30	6	"Episode 3.06"	Rotem Shamir	Noah Stallman	30 January 2020
Doron and his team run into Hamas militants, resulting in a skirmish that causes a cave in. The three special operatives are evacuated and grapple with their failed rescue mission. The Hamdans deliver their hostages to the Hamas commander Hani al-Jabari, who intends to use the Israeli hostages to facilitate a prisoner exchange with Israel. Doron and Hila enter into a romantic relationship, and the latter convinces the Israeli military to send an undercover team consisting of Doron, Eli, Sagi Tzur and Avihai to infiltrate Gaza and rescue the hostages. Doron allows Steven to stay behind in order to mend relations with his wife Anat and baby son.
31	7	"Episode 3.07"	Rotem Shamir	Noah Stallman	6 February 2020
Doron's team infiltrate Gaza City using motor boats. After landing, they rendezvous with their local Gazan asset Abu Iyad, a secretary to the ruling Sheikh who leads them to a safe house. When questioned by a Hamas policemen, Doron and his team pose as businessmen from the West Bank. Meanwhile, Jihad and Bashar Hamdan are confined by their Hamas hosts to a hotel room. Samir Abu Samhadana, a businessman from Rafah, offers the duo a job at his garage. Bashar begins questioning his life choices. Elad manages to kill one of his Hamas captors with a hidden pocket knife and escapes. He contacts the Israeli authorities Gabi and Hila, who put him in contact with Doron's team. Doron's team instructs Elad to rendezvous with them outside a mosque and use a smoke grenade to distract the Hamas soldiers. However, Elad is killed during the extraction attempt. Hani al-Jabari is furious that a hostage was killed. After discovering the smoke grenade, he realizes that the Israelis have infiltrated Gaza.
32	8	"Episode 3.08"	Rotem Shamir	Noah Stallman	13 February 2020
Following Elad's death, Hani al-Jabari and the Sheikh task Jihad and Bashar with guarding the remaining hostage, Yaara. In retaliation for the Hamdans' role in kidnapping the Israeli hostages, the IDF demolishes the Hamdans' family home, leaving Noor and Hayfa homeless. After learning about the home demolition, Jihad calls Noor and promises to get Bashar out of Gaza. Noor however rebuffs his instruction to flee to Jordan. Their phone call is intercepted by the Israeli authorities who track down Jihad's location using his SIM card. Jihad is killed during a shootout with Doron. A grief-stricken Bashar vows to avenge his father's death. al-Jabari traces Jihad's SIM card to Abu Iyad, whom he exposes as an Israeli asset. After learning that Iyad provided the Israelis with intelligence that killed most of his family, al-Jabari summarily executes him. Doron and the team offer to help Iyad's family escape Gaza.
33	9	"Episode 3.09"	Rotem Shamir	Noah Stallman	20 February 2020
Samir Abu Samhadana provides Bashar with a passport that would allow him to leave the Palestinian Territories and Israel. Doron and his team save Um Iyad and her children from being killed by a group of Hamas soldiers led by Issam Yunis. After arranging for Um Iyad to rendezvous at an extraction point, they receive intelligence from Gabi that Bashar is heading to Al-Shifa hospital to pay respect to his late father. Using a captive Yunis, Doron and his squad infiltrate the hospital and engage in a gun battle with Bashar, al-Jabari and his soldiers. Avihai is seriously wounded by Bashar and the squad are separated. Eli and Sagi manage to escape with al-Jabari while Doron and Avihai seek shelter with a Palestinian journalist, who hides them from Hamas and gets a doctor. Due to Avihai's deteriorating condition, Doron and Avihai decide to surrender themselves to the Hamas forces outside the hospital. However, they are rescued by Steven and Nurit, who shoot and take out several Hamas soldiers. Together, the four rendezvous with Eli and Sagi but Avihai succumbs to his injuries.
34	10	"Episode 3.10"	Rotem Shamir	Noah Stallman	27 February 2020
An Israeli military helicopter evacuates Um Iyad, her children and Avihai's remains. Doron and the other team members decide to stay behind to rescue Yaara. After learning that Hani al-Jabari still has a surviving daughter named Dunya, they take her hostage and force him force him to lead them to Samir Abu Samhadana's estate, where Bashar is holding Yaara hostage. Doron and another operative accompany al-Jabari into Samir's estate disguised as his bodyguards. Mohammed attempts to convince Samir to hand over Yaara. However, Bashar realizes their plan and warns Samir, who orders his guards to kill the visitors. Nurit releases Dunya and the rest of the team launch a rescue mission using a stolen ambulance. Bashar attempts to take Yaara into Egypt but Yaara escapes his vehicle and is rescued by Doron. However, their ambulance breaks down, leaving them stranded in Gaza.
35	11	"Episode 3.11"	Rotem Shamir	Noah Stallman	5 March 2020
Following Gabi's instructions, Doron's team and Yaara rendezvous with an Israeli Army unit in a field. The team and their colleagues celebrate the successful rescue mission and reunite with their families. Bashar kills Hani al-Jabari for leading the Israelis to Samir's estate and joins Hamas, vowing revenge against Doron for killing his relatives. With the Sheik's blessing, he and two Hamas fighters infiltrate Israel through the Gaza tunnel system. Gabi later meets with Hayfa but she refuses to betray her brother. Doron is nominated for a Medal of Honor but is embittered by the death of Avihai. He blames Hila for causing Avihai's death through faulty intelligence, leading to a breakdown in their relationship. Doron befriends Avihai's widow and her children.
36	12	"Episode 3.12"	Rotem Shamir	Noah Stallman	12 March 2020
A Druze sniper named Majdi joins Doron's squad. They pursue three Hamas commandos, killing one and capturing a second named Mussa. Amira interrogates him and learns that the third commando was Bashar Hamdan. Gabi survives an assassination by his physiotherapist Fahed, a Hamas asset who helped Bashar and his team infiltrate Israel. At their former home, Bashar makes contact with his sister Hayfa, who is bitter towards him for the trouble he has caused their family. Seeking revenge against Doron, Bashar takes the former hostage Yaara hostage. Doron attempts to deescalate the situation but Bashar shoots Yaara dead. Doron attempts to kill Bashar but is restrained by his colleagues. Bashar is welcomed as a hero by Palestinian prisoners.

=== Season 4 ===
No. overall	No. in season	Title	Directed by	Written by	Original release date
37	1	"Episode 4.01"	Omri Givon	Noah Stallman	13 July 2022
Following the events in Gaza, Doron has retired from military service and become a horse farmer. A squad of undercover IDF soldiers including Steven, Sagi and Nurit foil a bank robbery attempt in Jenin. The sole surviving robber is revealed to be Jamal Masalha, a sergeant in Palestinian Preventive Security. Dana informs the Preventive Security chief Abu Osama, who interrogates Masalha and provides the IDF with intelligence on a Hezbollah safehouse in Jenin, where computers and satellite phones are uncovered. Doron reluctantly attends Sagi's wedding, where Gabi convinces him to serve as his bodyguard on a mission to Belgium to extract an asset named Omar Tawalbe. Omar is part of a Hezbollah cell in Molenbeek which is connected to the Jenin attempted bank robbery. In Brussels, the two join with other Israeli agents to rendezvous with Omar. However, the meeting is trap set by Omar and his Hezbollah cell, who kidnap Gabi and kill the other agents. In Israel, Dana separately learns that the safehouse is connected to another Hezbollah operative named Adel Tawalbe and that his cousin Omar is part of the conspiracy. Adel murders Jamal to prevent him from exposing the rest of the Hezbollah network.
38	2	"Episode 4.02"	Omri Givon	Noah Stallman	20 July 2022
Maya Binyamin is a decorated Israeli-Arab police officer who is married to an Israeli Jewish police officer named Amos Binyamin. As the estranged sister of Omar Tawalbe and the cousin of Adel Tawalbe, she and her family are detained for questioning by Israeli authorities. In Brussels, Belgian police led by detective Angela investigate the killings of the Israeli agents and the kidnapping of Gabi. Doron blames himself for failing to protect Gabi and expresses frustration with the Belgian authorities. The Israeli station chief Ivri enlists the help of Doron's former colleagues Eli, Steven, Sagi and Nurit in the rescue operation. Omar interrogates his captive Gabi, revealing that his motives for joining Hezbollah is to atone for his father, who was killed for collaborating with the Israelis. Through the interrogation, Omar passes information about collaborators to Adel, whose men commence killing several including Abu Kareem. Seeking answers, Doron and his comrades kidnap the imam of the mosque that Omar attended in Molenbeek.
39	3	"Episode 4.03"	Omri Givon	Noah Stallman	27 July 2022
Due to her family connections to Omar and Adel, Maya is suspended from active duty. She visits her mother for information about Omar's whereabouts but she is unable to help. In Ramallah, Abu Osama threatens Adel's wife Shara. In retaliation, Adel and his men summarily execute Osama for collaborating with the Israelis. Meanwhile in Belgium, Doron and his comrades interrogate the imam, who provides them and the Belgian authorities with information leading to a housing complex in Molenbeek that has a large Muslim population. Doron confronts Eli about why he supported his dismissal from service while Nurit reveals she is in the early stages of her pregnancy. After Doron and Nurit scout the area, the Israelis and Belgian police launch a rescue operation following a request from the deputy director of Shin Bet. They fight and kill several Hezbollah operatives but are unable to stop Omar and his team from escaping with the wounded Gabi.
40	4	"Episode 4.04"	Omri Givon	Noah Stallman	3 August 2022
Doron and his team return to Israel. Shin Bet receives communication from Hezbollah in Lebanon, proposing a prisoner swap in return for Gabi's release. While Shin Bet believes Gabi is dead, Doron refuses to abandon his friend. With Nurit on maternity leave, Shane Russo is sent as a replacement agent. Using intelligence from Amira, Eli and the team detain the pharmacist Ismail Tamimi, who serves as a courier for Musab Al-Adas, Abu Osama's former driver who is a Hezbollah courier. Ismail reveals that Musab was travelling to al-Shaykh Muwannis. Hezbollah operatives target Elad and Laci, and attack Doron. Doron kills his assassin Abu Khaled and warns Dana. Meanwhile, Omar reunites with Adel at the Hezbollah headquarters in Beirut. He contacts his sister Maya, providing instructions.
41	5	"Episode 4.05"	Omri Givon	Noah Stallman	10 August 2022
Dana survives an assassination attempt by Musab, who is captured. However, Hezbollah operatives succeed in killing several Israeli agents and their assets. The surviving agents and their families are housed in a kibbutz for their protection. Sagi's relationship with Nurit deteriorates after she reveals that she wants to abort their unborn child. Dana manages to force Musab to work for Shin Bet by threatening to expose his homosexual relationship with Ismail. Gabi's successor Raphael convinces a reluctant Dana to reinstate Doron to the team. Doron has a reunion with Shane Russo, who has worked with the team previously. Adel informs Abu Khaled's parents of their son's passing but is rebuffed. Meanwhile, Shin Bet operatives are revealed to have used a deep fake of Omar Tawalbe to have convinced Maya to pick up fake passports for her brother. Under her "brother"'s instructions, Maya travels to a border town near the Israel-Syria border and rendezvous with Doron, who is posing as an Arab friend of Omar named "Salim al-Hamis." Doron brings her to the Israel-Syria border purportedly to rendezvous with Omar. Meanwhile, Eli and Steven attempt to kill Adel with a car bomb in Jenin but the mission goes awry when Steven chooses to save Adel's son Kareem.
42	6	"Episode 4.06"	Omri Givon	Noah Stallman	17 August 2022
Following the car bombing, Russo attends to the critically wounded Kareem. Posing as a Palestinian nurse named Yasmin, Russo gains the trust of Shara. Adel later visits his family and vows revenge against the Israelis. Dana rebukes Eli, Steven and Sagi for setting a car bomb against her orders. The four argue about the ethics of their undercover work. Seeking to eliminate Adel, Shin Bet sends Musab to rendezvous with Adel while tracking his movements using his cellphone. Realizing that Musab has been compromised, Adel takes him for a car ride. Believing that Adel is inside the car, Shin Bet uses a Predator drone to blow up the car. Seeking to make amends, Musab chooses to die in Adel's place. Israeli soldiers sent to rendezvous with Musab are attacked by a masked gunman, who takes out two of them. Meanwhile in Syria, Doron and Maya meet with a Syrian Druze contact who instructs them to travel towards Nahr al-Bared refugee camp in Lebanon to get false identity documents. The duo pose as a couple while travelling through Syria.
43	7	"Episode 4.07"	Omri Givon	Noah Stallman	24 August 2022
Dana learns of the death of a colleague who was killed in an ambush by Hezbollah operatives. In Syria, Doron and Maya are stopped at a road block by Syrian security forces, who have received intelligence from Hezbollah about two undercover Israeli operatives. The two pose as a refugee couple. Before the Syrian officials can detain them for questioning, Doron kills the interrogator and his colleague. After stealing a car, the two flee into the Syrian countryside. While sheltering inside a house, Doron maintains his cover as a failed engineer who got entangled with Adel. Maya discloses her background as an Israeli police officer placed under investigation due to her family ties to Omar Tawalbe. Doron manages to reestablish contact with Raphael and the Shin Bet team. Meanwhile, the Hezbollah commanders in Syria learn that the two Israeli infiltrators are Maya but are unaware of Doron's identity. Fearing that the duo will jeopardize their plot to attack Israel with missiles, Hezbollah resolves to capture them.
44	8	"Episode 4.08"	Omri Givon	Noah Stallman	31 August 2022
In Syria, Doron and Maya travel to the home of Aisha, the wife of Omar. Shin Bet intends to use Aisha to lure Omar into a trap so that he can be taken out by a Predator drone. However, Doron goes rogue and kills Aisha's bodyguards. He takes both Maya and Aisha hostage and uses them to lure Omar into a trap in a grove. Before Doron can kill Omar, Omar reveals that his friend and former superior Gabi is still alive as a captive of Hezbollah. Back in Israel, the pregnant Nurit socializes with the wives of her colleagues. Dana receives intelligence about a safehouse at an auto garage in Jenin. Eli, Stephen, Sagi and Russo raid the safehouse and discover a stockpile of missiles.
45	9	"Episode 4.09"	Omri Givon	Noah Stallman	7 September 2022
Doron takes his captives Maya and Omar to a Lebanese safehouse run by Nimer, a Christian Lebanese asset of the Israelis. During interrogation, Omar reveals that Gabi is being held inside a fortified Hezbollah villa in Beirut's Saifi Village. Nimer scouts the area and confirms the presence of a senior Hezbollah figure named Haj Ali, who intends to send Gabi to the Iranians. Based on Nimer's intelligence, Doron is able to convince Raphael and Dana to send a team led by Eli to rescue Gabi. The rescue team rendezvouses with Doron and Nimer, who devise a plan that involves the group disguising themselves as Lebanese policemen. Omar is allowed to speak with both Maya and his wife Aisha before accompanying the rescue team. Maya had convinced him to cooperate in return for being allowed family visitations while in Israeli prison custody. Meanwhile, Nurit decides to keep her baby daughter and become a mother in memory of her fallen comrade Avihai. Russo also questions her undercover work due to Adel's son Kareem being seriously wounded in an assassination attempt.
46	10	"Episode 4.10"	Omri Givon	Noah Stallman	14 September 2022
Disguised as Lebanese police personnel, the Israeli strike team intercepts a car carrying Hamas officials. With the help of Omar, they question one of the passengers, who reveals that the Hezbollah convoy is taking Gabi to a crossing along the Lebanon-Syria border. The strike team manages to reach the border before Hezbollah can take Gabi into Syria. Following a gunfight with Hezbollah and Syrian forces, the strike team rescues Gabi and rendezvous with IDF helicopters. Before Omar can board a helicopter, a vengeful Gabi shoots him dead, much to Maya's horror. Back in Israel, Maya is released by Dana after signing the official secrets act. Maya is bitter that the Israeli government manipulated her in order to hunt down her younger brother Omar. She separates from her husband Amos and returns to her family in Jenin. Meanwhile, Adel reunites with his wife Sharaa. Doron invites a traumatised Gabi to his farm to recover.
47	11	"Episode 4.11"	Omri Givon	Noah Stallman	21 September 2022
On Doron's farm, Gabi recovers from his time in Hezbollah captivity and reconnects with his wife and son. Meanwhile, Maya reconnects with the rest of the Tawalbe family, who mourn the death of Omar, whose remains are being held by the Israeli authorities. Doron also briefly reunites with Maya but receives an icy reception. Adel forces an Israeli Arab farmer named Abu Ibrahim to allow his group to install missile launchers on his land. These missiles strike several Israeli cities and towns, killing eight people. Israeli authorities detain Abu Ibrahim and learn that Adel is sheltering in a Palestinian refugee camp. To avoid causing heavy civilian casualties, Gabi convinces Dana to lure Adel into a trap by allowing his family to hold his funeral in Jenin. Meanwhile, Stephen's wife Anat seeks a divorce and she gains custody of their young son Michael. Doron, who is divorced, offers emotional support to his comrade.
48	12	"Episode 4.12"	Omri Givon	Noah Stallman	28 September 2022
The Coordinator of Government Activities in the Territories contacts Maya and her family to facilitate the return of Omar's remains to his family. Doron disagrees with the mission on the grounds that the Israeli authorities have hurt Maya and her family enough but is overruled by Dana and Gabi, who see this as an opportunity to assassinate Adel. While the Tawalbe family mourn Omar, Doron and his strike team disguise themselves as Hamas militants and lead the funeral procession through the streets of Jenin. A disguised Doron warns Maya to evacuate her family. When Adel and his fellow militants arrive, Doron and his team engage them in a gun battle. Adel and his followers retreat to their safehouse where they make a last-stand. Eli, Sagi and Russo are seriously wounded. Following a struggle, Doron kills Adel and his comrades before they can take his colleagues hostage. Dana dispatches Israeli helicopters to evacuate the squad from Jenin.

=== Season 5 ===
No. overall	No. in season	Title	Directed by	Written by	Original release date
49	1	"Episode 5.01"	Omri Givon	Omri Senhar	18 May 2026
The episode is set two years after the October 7 attacks. During the attacks, Eli's wife Hagit and their children were killed. His Bedouin Arab friend Salem Al Heib, also lost his son, whom Hamas killed for collaboration. Eli and Salem learn the identity of one of the attackers, Iyad Dahdouh, who is now living in Marseille. Doron has lost eight hours of memory and is struggling to recover it, and is worried about Eli. Gabi is now in private security, but helps Doron figure out where Eli and Salem have gone. Dahdouh is tipped off about his pursuers. Doron follows them to Marseille, but by the time he catches up with Eli, Salem is dead, and Dahdouh and an associate of his are dead. Under interrogation, Dahdouh had offered the name of Maher Zeytoun, his commander, who is also in Marseille.
50	2	"Episode 5.02"	Omri Givon	Omri Senhar	18 May 2026
Eli and Doron tail and ultimately catch Maher Zeytoun, whom we see being ordered by Abu Zaher to close all of their community center's accounts. Steve shows up at Eli's request and Steve and Doron have unfinished business from the period Doron can't remember. Maher claims to be a Shin Bet informant and proves it by getting through to Dana Marciano. Eli, Doron, and Steve could get in serious trouble for messing with an informant, so Doron arranges to hand Maher over to Dana in exchange for safe travel home. At the exchange, Maher tells Doron to tell Eli that he didn't kill Hagit, but he did rape her. Doron kills Maher and leaves. Maher has a French wife, Anne, who also knows Abu Zaher. Agent Bruno investigates the case for French intelligence.
51	3	"Episode 5.03"	Omri Givon	Omri Senhar	25 May 2026
Doron asks Gabi for help getting home, and Gabi comes to Marseille. Dana meets with Bruno, who suspects Israeli involvement in the deaths of Iyad and Maher. Gabi and Doron meet with Dana, who says that Maher was her contact within the network of Saeed el Hatib, Hamas's leader in Europe, to whom Abu Zaher reports. Doron, Eli, and Steve agree to help catch Abu Zaher. While Anne grieves over Maher, Doron argues with his ex-wife Gali about his predicament. Saeed meets with Bruno, their mole within the French government, whose career he apparently helped along, to demand action against the Israelis, but Bruno can only identify Steve. Abu Zaher coordinates a protest against the police, which Anne joins and which turns violent. Doron and Eli manage to nab Abu Zaher during the protest, but Steve is delayed and then arrested, so they let him go. Abu Zaher later picks them up and starts to interrogate them at gunpoint about their intentions.
52	4	"Episode 5.04"	Omri Givon	Omri Senhar	1 June 2026
Doron and Eli are able to pass for Palestinians, and Abu Zaher has them further prove themselves by helping with a successful jewelry store heist. They meet with Saeed, who invites them to join the next big operation, starting with training for which their relative experience will be valuable. It is revealed that Saeed is planning a major attack on Israel during Independence Day celebrations. Meanwhile Anne convinces Saeed to let her participate by threatening to act alone otherwise. Lia pretends to have a brother in trouble to get one of Saeed's guard's number, which Gabi's people in Israel hack to hear that Saeed helped Bruno by feeding him ISIS and Al Qaeda targets to divert attention from his own people, as well as Bruno warning Saeed to leave Marseille immediately. Bruno beats up Steve, but gets nothing from him. Naama comes to Marseille to help Dana accuse the French of permitting an attack to develop.
53	5	"Episode 5.05"	Omri Givon	Omri Senhar	8 June 2026
Doron, Eli, and Anne's convoy is stopped by a group of Saeed's men who pretend to be Israeli unit 504 to test them. Anne holds up under the fake interrogation by asserting that she is completing her husband's charitable mission and didn't know about his Hamas activity, while Doron openly sees through it, and Eli survives waterboarding and attacks his interrogator to prove his bona fides, though Abu Zaher still doesn't trust him. Bruno's suspended, and Naama apologizes so Dana can retrieve Steve. Gabi and Dana lie to Gali that everything's under control, but Gali worries about Doron's memory lapses that have happened more than once and won't trust anybody but Gabi, whom Naama finally agrees to take on temporarily.
54	6	"Episode 5.06"	Omri Givon	Omri Senhar	15 June 2026
Eli continues to be unable to mute his anger and Doron worries for Eli's stability. Doron directs Eli and headquarters to expedite their extraction from the terrorist training camp, but Eli insists on obtaining more intel on the forthcoming attack before leaving. During field training, Anne has second thoughts when encountering a mock up of a woman and a child she is supposed to shot at. Doron discretely offers to extract her before it's too late. That night, an IDF force lands nearby and moves in, but not before Eli breaks into the safe room, forces Zaher to open the safe, shoots Zaher, finds the attack plans and uploads them to headquarters. Doron realizes what Eli has done and tries to get to him, but Anne, who is on guard duty, shoots Eli first. Eli dies in Doron's arms, saying he is at peace.
55	7	"Episode 5.07"	Omri Givon	Omri Senhar	22 June 2026
A flashback to Oct 7, 2023 begins with Eli at home in Sderot with his wife, Hagit. He is summoned at 3AM via phone call to monitor a situation near the Gaza border in the south, after hundreds of SIM cards were detected as activating. The unit he is in waits the rest of the night until a sudden violent barage of rockets at 6:30AM. The rockets are accompanied by infiltrations of invading Hamas fighters. Eli survives but a comrade is shot. Elsewhere, Dara is wounded in the ear and falls unconscious. Once Eli realizes the scale of the attack, he asks Doron and Steve to find and protect Hagit and his children. Doron and Steve rendezvous, plunging directly into the chaos that authorities try to stop them from entering. In Sderot, hearing air raid sirens, Hagit, the children, and a Muslim neighbor lock themselves in the house's safe room together. They see Hamas fighters, led by Mahar, approach on their home security cameras. The fighters proceed to pound on the safe room door, demanding entry.
56	8	"Episode 5.08"	Omri Givon	Omri Senhar	22 June 2026
Eli helps his injured comrade to an abandoned school, keeping him conscious and applying first aid. When other IDF soldiers arrive to the school to tend to the comrade, Eli leaves, shoots a Hamas fighter, steals his truck, and heads toward Sderot to his family. Meanwhile, Doron with Steve drives his truck across fields towards Sderot, but encounters fleeing survivors from the Nova music festival massacre. They fill the truck and drive the survivors to safety. Doron is about to continue onward to Sderot, but a young man from the festival pleads that they first return to the festival scene to rescue his girlfriend. Over Steve's objections, Doron follows the young man to a container where many festival attendees were hiding. Unable to climb out of the container, the man is immediately shot upon his attends to climb in. Doron joins in the container before a Hamas fighter lobs a grenade, knocking Doron unconscious and leaving the rest dead. Doron's episodic memory becomes disjointed as he lays out the dead bodies on the ground. He emerges and rejoins Steve in the truck, and the two proceed to Sderot. Meanwhile, Hagit, her children, and the neighbor bar entry to the safe room from the attackers, so the attackers light a fire, hoping to smoke them out. As the smoke fills the room, the neighbor plans to distract the fighters while Hagit and her children escape out the window, but the neighbor is immediately shot and Hagit is quickly discovered. Her children are shot in front of her, while she is raped by Matar and later killed. Finally, Eli arrives back to his house, but Doron and Steven, already there, try to prevent Eli from entering to see the carnage. The final shot is Eli cradling Hagit's body, repeating סליחה ("I'm sorry...").
57	9	"Episode 5.09"	Omri Givon	Omri Senhar	29 June 2026
With Eli (as "Ali") having apparently betrayed the terrorist camp, Doron comes under suspicion and is interrogated to vet his loyalties. Anne continues to express doubts but moves forward. Dana is told by her doctor that her health symptoms are likely a result of work stress, that she should take care of her emotional well being. As the IDF team moves into the evacuated terrorist camp, headquarters and Steve learn of Eli's death. Steve sorts through Eli's things and becomes despondent over his lost colleagues, fearing Doron among them. Using the information sent by Eli, Dana and the team conduct raids, though the suspects mostly set off explosives before being caught. One is caught alive, but won't give information. Gabi ponders to Dana on the ways that he has failed the team, and Dana realizes that Gabi is the best man to interrogate the apprehended suspect. Finding that the suspect's brother's location is being kept separate from Hamas, Gabi uses this to blackmail the suspect into talking, giving the team a lead on Doron's whereabouts, as well as Hamas' next large attack. Saeed is informed that Hamas leadership has decided to cancel the operation, but he persists on continuing. Steve gets a phone call, and is told to report for duty to help rescue Doron.
58	10	"Episode 5.10"	Omri Givon	Omri Senhar	6 July 2026
Steve and a Shin Bet team move to intercept the terrorist party from crossing the Jordan-Israel border, but apprehend harmless illegal immigrants instead, learning too late that the party crossed elsewhere. On the day before the attack, Doron and the other recruits are told to call their families. Doron discretely calls Gabi, whom he refers to as his "Uncle Khaled", and leaks the attack plans. The next day, Anne and a European recruit are strapped with explosive vests, and the two of them are put into a car with Doron and a driver. Shin Bet has various suspicious vehicles followed, but they are all vacant, save for their drivers. Vehicles are blown up and suspects questioned but Doron's whereabouts remain unknown until the Outlander he's riding in meets a road checkpoint. Doron takes charge and tells the driver and other car occupants he will fabricate a story about their origins to the soldier, but the driver orders Anne and the recruit to arm their vests. Doron jumps out of the car, quickly and surreptitiously explains himself to the IDF checkpoint soldier, grabbing the soldier's pistol and shooting the recruit, the driver, but sparing Anne, who is then arrested. The team learns that the attack intel Doron had leaked does not match the ground situation and they had been played all along.
59	11	"Episode 5.11"	Omri Givon	Omri Senhar	9 July 2026
In the season finale, the team knows a large scale terror attack is coming but does not know enough specifics to take preventative measures. Gabi questions Anne, who he learns never really appreciated the details of her late husband, Abu Maher's involvement in Oct 7. He orders Dana send over the confession footage of Maher for Anne's viewing. Doron reunites with Gali and shares that he had recovered the memories he had repressed from Oct 7 while waiting in the terrorist training camp. Recalling what happened, Doron reflects that Eli had in some sense died that day 2 years ago on Oct 7. Dana expresses guilt over recruiting Maher despite his crimes, as well as the security failures that allowed Oct 7. Her supervisor Naama reveals that she knew that Dana had lied about Maher's death but respected her choice even while maintaining plausible deniability as her supervisor. Upon seeing Maher's confession and learning the gruesome details of his acts, Anne relents and recalls the terrorist leader Saeed describing Remembrance Day observances as the intended attack target. The team quickly deploys and hones in on observances in one cemetery, following intel about suspicious taxi rides. Doron identifies two of the terrorists from his time spent training with them, but a firefight breaks out. The civilians pour out of the cemetery, only to be ambushed by other Hamas fighters. Doron spots a limping Saeed, following him until he stops. Doron shoots Saeed several times, after conveying that he is avenging Eli, Eli's family, and Oct 7. Though there are casualties, the attack is put down. The next day, Doron sits on a bench with Anne, who is still detained and presumably awaiting trial. Doron thanks her for the intel she gave and Anne asks if Doron was the one to kill her husband, which Doron tacitly acknowledges. The two reflect on the shared experience of grief having left them willing to kill innocent people. Anne asks if Doron can stop the urges, to which he answers, "I will try". The next scene shows Doron and the Shin Bet team mourning Eli, which concludes with Doron tearfully reciting the Mourner's Kaddish. The party places stones on Eli's grave. Afterwards, Doron goes to a sink and begins to cry.
