= Fauda =

Israeli political thriller television series

- פאודה
- Genre: Action; Serial drama; Psychological thriller; Political thriller; Espionage thriller
- Created by: Lior Raz; Avi Issacharoff
- Based on: Original script
- Starring: Lior Raz; Hisham Sulliman; Shadi Mar'i; Laëtitia Eïdo; Tzachi Halevy; Yuval Segal; Neta Gerti; Tomer Kapon; Itzik Cohen; Rona-Lee Shimon
- Composer: Gilad Benamram
- Country of origin: Israel
- Original languages: Hebrew; Arabic (Note: With some dialogue in English and French)
- No. of seasons: 5
- No. of episodes: 59

Production
- Camera setup: Single-camera
- Running time: 45 minutes
- Production company: Yes - Satellite Television

Original release
- Network: Yes Oh
- Release: February 15, 2015 – present

Related
- Tanaav

Fauda (Hebrew: פאודה, from Arabic: فوضى fawḍā, meaning "chaos" or "mess") is an Israeli television series that premiered in 2015. It was developed by Lior Raz and Avi Issacharoff, who drew on their experiences in the Israel Defense Forces (IDF). It tells the story of Doron, a commander in the Mista'arvim unit and his team; in the first season, they pursue a Hamas arch-terrorist known as "The Panther". Internationally, the series is streamed by Netflix.

The first season was filmed in Kafr Qasim during the 2014 Gaza War, and premiered on 15 February 2015. The second season premiered on 31 December 2017. The third season takes place in the Gaza Strip and aired in 2019 and 2020. A fourth season aired in early 2023 and it expands the Fauda world to Brussels, Syria, and Lebanon. Season 5 was filmed in 2025 and was released on 18 May 2026.

A feature film adaptation of the series is being developed as of September 2026.

== Synopsis ==
The first season focuses on Doron, a former Mista'arev (special Israeli soldiers trained to operate undercover as Arabs for intelligence-gathering operations), who learns that Taufiq Hammed ("Abu Ahmad") former Hamas terrorist whom he and his unit were credited for killing, is still alive and plotting a terror attack. Doron rejoins his former unit to hunt down and eliminate Hammed, setting the stage for a chaotic chain of events. The last episode of the first season ends with Taufiq's sidekick Walid killing his mentor.

In the second season, Doron leaves his unit, separates from his wife and moves back with his father. Following the events of the first season, Walid has become "the head of the military wing of Hamas in the West Bank". The main antagonist in the second season is Nidal Awadallah (also known as "Abu Seif al-Maqdisi"), the son of the Sheikh who was killed in the first season, and an operative in the Islamic State organization who has returned from Syria and wants to take revenge on Doron for killing his father. Adopting the Mista'arvim's tactics, Nidal's ISIS operatives pose as Israeli personnel. In this season, the fight is more personal, between Doron and Nidal, and focuses a lot on their attempts to hurt each other's family.

The third season is set six months after the events of the second season. Doron has resumed his undercover work as Abu Fadi, a boxing instructor who is training Bashar, a young aspiring Palestinian boxer in Hebron. Bashar is the son of Jihad Hamdan, who had been imprisoned for the past 20 years for his involvement with a Palestinian terrorist cell. Following Jihad's release in prison, Doron and Bashar are caught up in a plot involving Bashar's cousin Fauzi smuggling weapons to Hamas in the Gaza Strip. In the process, Doron's cover is blown. Bashar is forced to prove his loyalty to his militant cousin and father. After the Hamdans kidnap two Israeli hikers, Doron and his comrades are forced to embark on a rescue mission behind enemy territory.

In the fourth season, Doron is retired and estranged from his Mista'arvim team. Doron reluctantly accompanies Shin Bet agent Gabi Ayub on a mission to Brussels to meet a source named Omar. However, this is a trap since Omar is a double agent working for Hezbollah and kidnaps Gabi. Taking the kidnapping of Gabi personally, Doron rejoins his squad as they pursue Hezbollah operatives. The rescue mission coincides with a Hezbollah plot to launch a missile attack against Israel.

The fifth season is set two years after the events of the October 7 attacks. Eli (Yaakov Zada-Daniel) and a Bedouin tracker named Salem (Bian Anteer) travel to Marseille to capture a Hamas operative who killed their relatives during the October 7 attacks. Doron and Steven (Doron Ben-David) are sent by their superiors to stop the rogue agents but are drawn into a struggle against the "system they were once part of." Eli and Doron infiltrate a local Hamas cell in Marseille, who are plotting to launch a major attack on Israel timed to coincide with Israeli Independence Day and Yom HaZikaron (Memorial Day).

== Cast and characters ==
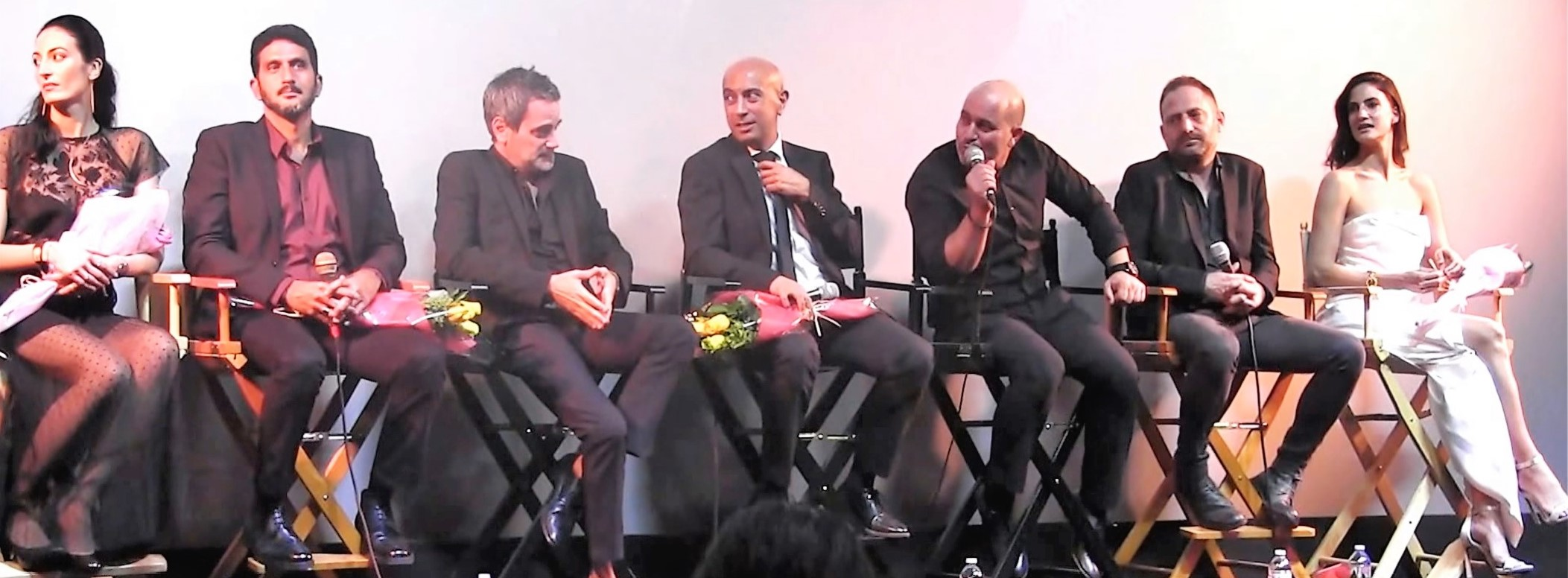
Cast and crew of Fauda in 2018: Left to right: Laetitia Eido, actor; Tsahi Halevi, actor; Gilad ben Amram, composer; Avi Issacharoff, co-creator; Lior Raz, co-creator, actor; Rotem Shamir, director; Rona-Lee Shimon, actor.

=== Main ===
- Doron Kabilio portrayed by Lior Raz. Doron is married to Gali, and has a son, Ido, and a daughter, Noga. Doron, after leaving the army, lives on a farm and grows grapes in order to make his own wine. Having been previously credited with killing Abu Ahmad, he rejoins his old Israel Defense Force (IDF) unit 18 months later, after intelligence discovered that Abu Ahmad was still alive.
- Taufiq Hammed portrayed by Hisham Sulliman. Taufiq is commonly referred to as Abu Ahmad, and is nicknamed "The Panther". He is married to Nassrin and had a son (Ahmad) and a daughter (Abir). Taufiq had been trained by Ali Karmi, since he was a kid, and considers him a father; however, he ordered Ali to be killed when Ali turned his back on him and gave information over to Israel in exchange for surgery for his daughter.
- Walid Al Abed portrayed by Shadi Mar'i. As of season 1, Walid is 20 years old. He is a trusted member of Taufiq's team, and one of the few who knows the truth about him being alive after his funeral. Taufiq views Walid like a son to him, and eventually Taufiq wants Walid to replace him. However, Walid eventually winds up killing Taufiq, shooting him in the head from behind. After shooting him, Walid cries and kisses Taufiq.
- Dr. Shirin Al Abed portrayed by Laëtitia Eïdo. Shirin is 32 years old as of season 1, and a cousin of Walid. Her mother is from Nablus, her father is from Paris. She volunteered with Doctors Without Borders in 2006. She studied medicine at An-Najah National University, and works in the emergency room of Rafidia Surgery Hospital. She is a widow who was originally married at age 23 to a chemist, named Naji, who died four years later from multiple sclerosis. She spent more of her life in Paris than in Israel, and left Paris after Naji died to be closer to her mother.
- Captain Gabi Ayub portrayed by Itzik Cohen. He has been divorced twice, and lives by himself. He has five kids, with the youngest son being named Nadav, and has another son named Yiftah. Gabi's favorite time of the year is when his family goes to the desert on vacation and he has no mode of communication with those who are not with him. He develops a respectful and affectionate relationship with Abu Maher, the head of Palestinian Preventive Security.
- Mickey Moreno portrayed by Yuval Segal, commander of Doron's former unit, who pulled him back in. He is romantically involved with Nurit. Following the issues which followed Boaz's capture, Moreno met with Gideon Avital in order to tell him his future plans for the unit, only to be told he was being let go, with the unit being disbanded. Moreno ultimately blackmails Avital into giving him his unit back, lest he will reveal to the press that the two of them had shot five prisoners in the head in Gaza years ago.
- Gali Kabilio portrayed by Netta Garti. Gali is Doron's wife, and Boaz's older sister. She is very unhappy with their life and wishes she could move outside of Israel. Gali is having an affair with a member of Doron's unit, Naor, and says she is no longer in love with Doron. Her son eventually finds out about the affair while listening in on their phone conversation, and later sees them kissing on the couch from upstairs. Ido eventually pulls Naor's gun on him stating that his father is not there because of him. Gali later tells Doron that he stopped fighting for her years ago, and she was afraid of him.
- Nassrin Hamed portrayed by Hanan Hillo. Nassrin is the wife of Taufiq, and her mother is Hafida. Nassrin grew up in Germany.
- Boaz portrayed by Tomer Kapon. Boaz is fluent in Arabic, and is a member of Doron's unit. As a cover he states he works with Arabs in the Ministry of Defense. He is Gali's younger brother. Boaz is murdered by Taufiq as revenge for shooting Bash.
- Naor portrayed by Tzachi Halevy. Naor is a member of Doron's unit. He has been having an affair with Doron's wife for over a year. When Gali mentions she is ready to leave Doron for him, he tells her to wait, because the situation is complicated with Doron back in the unit. Following the issues which followed Boaz's capture, Moreno intended to make Naor team leader, before Moreno was also told the unit would be disbanded.
- Nurit portrayed by Rona-Lee Shimon, is the sole female member of Doron's unit. She is romantically involved with Moreno. She is dour and rarely smiles. Initially a staff member, she becomes an active member of the team, acting undercover.
- Avihai portrayed by Boaz Konforty. A member of Doron's unit, he has a wife and one son (Guy). Avihai considers himself to be an attack dog, always be ready to jump right into action without emotion. Following the issues which followed Boaz's capture, Moreno informed Avihai that he was being discharged, before Moreno was also told the unit would be disbanded.
- Steve Pinto portrayed by Doron Ben-David, is a member of Doron's unit. Although he goes by Steve, his birth name is Hertzel. Steve has a crush on Nurit, and attempts to kiss her while staking out Abir. Following the issues which followed Boaz's capture, Moreno informed Steve that he was being discharged, before Moreno was told the unit would be disbanded. Steve later brings Doron to Boaz's grave, where he cries while reciting Kaddish.
- Abu Maher, portrayed by Qader Harini, is the head of the Palestinian Preventive Security. Abu Maher is reconciled to peace and coexistence, and therefore willing to cooperate with the Israelis to combat Islamist terror. Ayub and Abu Maher share intelligence to figure out how to best their common foe, be it Hamas or ISIS.

==== Later season additions ====
- Sagi Tzur, portrayed by Idan Amedi, joins the unit in Season 2. Through early clashes with Doron, Sagi is shown as being brash and hot-headed. He becomes romantically involved with Nurit, eventually marrying her in Season 4. Amedi announced he would be leaving the shown in Feb 2025 due to an injury sustained while on duty in Gaza.
- Bashar Hamdan, portrayed by Ala Dakka in Season 3, a young aspiring Palestinian boxer in Hebron. Bashar is the son of Jihad Hamdan, who had been imprisoned for the past 20 years for his involvement with a Palestinian terrorist cell. Under the Arab alias "Abu Fadi", Doron trains Bashar to embed himself in the Hamas terror network.
- Maya Binyamin, portrayed by Lucy Ayoub is a main character in Season 4. She is a decorated officer in the Israeli police. As an Israeli Arab married to a Jew and the sister of Lebanese source, Omar, Maya struggles with loyalties divided between her country, her identity, her brother, and husband.
- Shani Russo, portrayed by Inbar Lavi is added to the unit partway through Season 4 as a replacement for Nurit while Nurit takes medical leave. Little backstory is given about Russo besides her preference for solitary missions and a brief conversation with Doron indicating that they had served together many years prior.

=== Recurring ===
- Ido Kabilio portrayed by Mel Malka, son of Doron and Gali. Ido, eventually finds out about the affair his mother is having with Naor, while listening in on a phone conversation, and later sees them kissing on the couch from upstairs. Ido eventually pulls Naor's gun on him stating that his father is not there because of him. After Doron stops him, Ido states that he should have killed him.
- Jihan Hamed portrayed by Khawlah Hag-Debsy
- Sheikh Awadalla portrayed by Salim Dau, is a spiritual leader and a close and trusted friend of Taufiq. When Taufiq wants to exchange Boaz for Hamas members imprisoned by Israel, Sheikh is the man he wants to run negotiations with Egypt. After Taufiq gives the order to detonate the bomb inside Boaz, Doron orders the bomb vest strapped to Sheikh to be detonated as well, killing him.
- Gideon Avital portrayed by Uri Gavriel, is the Minister of Defense. While in Gaza with Moreno, years prior to entering politics, they shot five prisoners in the head.

== Episodes ==
Series	Episodes	Originally released	
Series	Episodes	First released	Last released
1	12	15 February 2015	3 May 2015
2	12	31 December 2017	18 March 2018
3	12	26 December 2019	12 March 2020
4	12	13 July 2022	28 September 2022
5	11	18 May 2026	9 July 2026

== Production ==
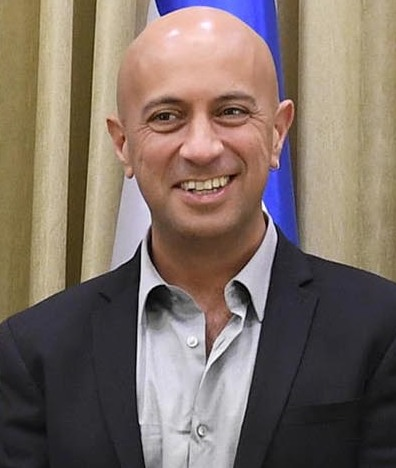
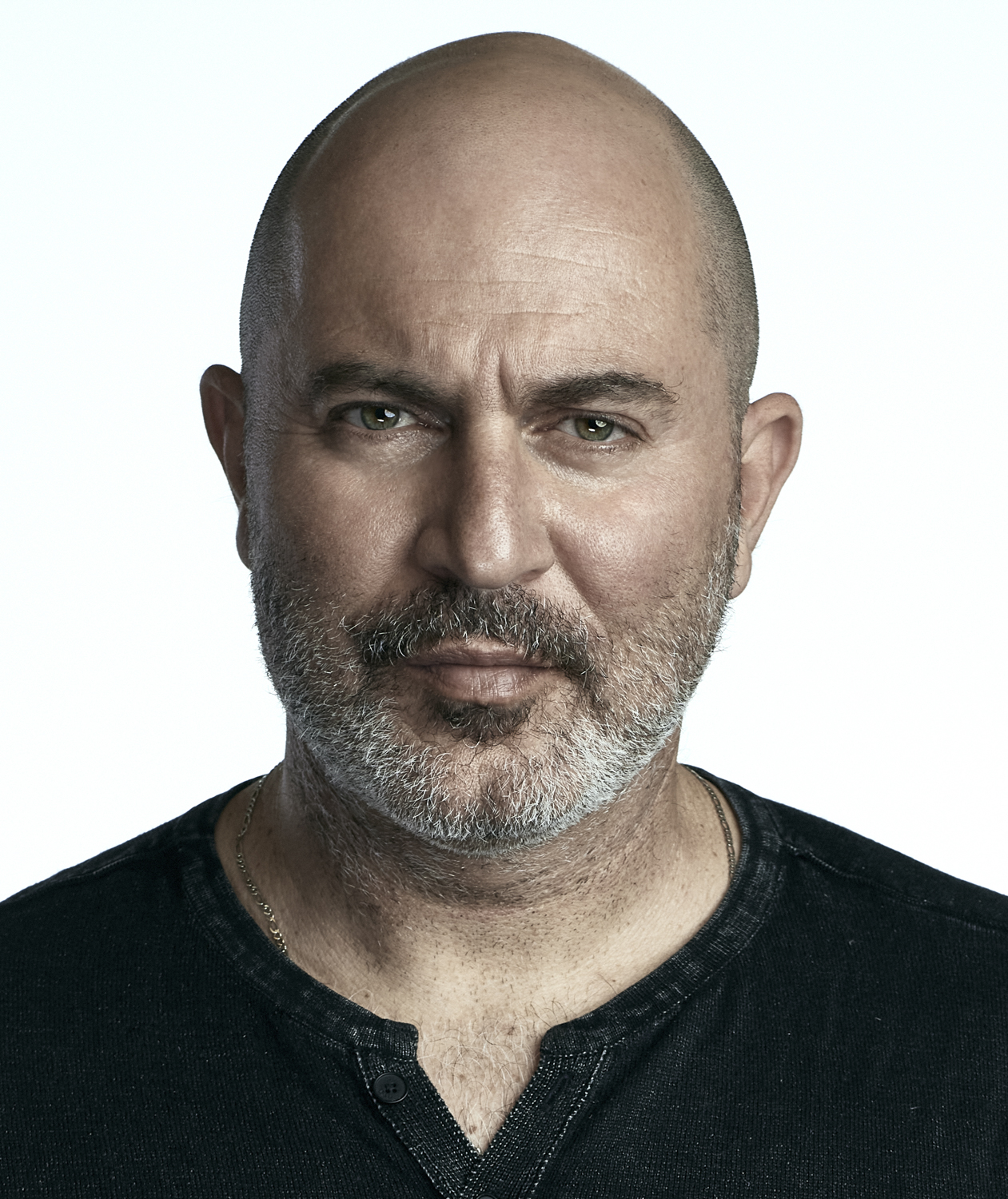
Avi Issacharoff and Lior Raz, the showrunners for Fauda.

=== Development and writing ===
Fauda was created by the journalist Avi Issacharoff and Lior Raz, an IDF veteran who also played the show's Israeli lead character Doron Kavillio. The series was produced by Liat Benasuly Productions and yes TV.

The first season was written by Moshe Zonder and directed by Assaf Bernstein. For the series' storyline and main character Doron, Raz drew upon his personal experiences as an undercover commando in the Israel Defense Forces. While pitching story ideas with Issacharoff, Raz proposed writing a story about Israeli special forces, undercover units and Palestinian characters.

In mid-July 2016, showrunner Issacharoff announced that Fauda had been renewed for a second season, which would focus on contemporary news headlines. He also confirmed that conflicts between the writers, production company and YES satellite TV had been resolved. In May 2017, fellow showrunner Raz stated that the second season would be more "personal" and would "talk about revenge" and "have a lot — a lot — of action." Amir Mann served as the head writer for the second season. Rotem Shamir served as the second season's director.

In December 2017, Fauda was renewed for a third season. The third season was written by Noah Stollman, directed by Rotem Shamir and produced by Liat Benasuly.

In mid-September 2020, Issacharoff and Raz confirmed that the series had been renewed for a fourth season, making it the longest-running Israeli action television series. The fourth season was directed by Omni Givon and written by Noah Stallman, with the plot focusing on the team dealing with new threats in the form of Hezbollah activists from Lebanon and Palestinian militants from the West Bank.

In 2023, the showrunners had rejected a proposed storyline for the fifth season by the writers about a group of Hamas terrorists breaching the Gaza border and taking over a kibbutz, deeming it "unbelievable" at the time. Following the October 7 attacks and the outbreak of the Gaza war in 2023, the showrunners abandoned the fifth season's original storyline and rewrote the script to incorporate the events of that conflict. The fifth season was directed by Omri Givon and written by Omri Senhar. In May 2026, Issacharoff posted on X (formerly Twitter) that he hoped that the fifth season would "bring to every point in the world the story of our personal and national trauma" stemming from the October 7 attacks. During an interview with Netflix's Tudum website in September 2026, Issacharoff said that the show's writers wanted to tell the truth about the October 7 attacks while Raz said that he hoped that people watching the fifth season "will understand the price of war, how hard it is." During an interview with Reuters in October 2026, Issacharoff denied that the show was promoting negative stereotypes about Muslims and Arabs and argued that the fifth season was focusing on Europeans recruited by Hamas. He also denied that Fauda was part of Israel's hasbara campaign and stated that the showrunners wanted to tell a story after the "national trauma" they suffered during the October 7 attacks.

=== Casting ===
Cast members for the first season included Lior Raz as Doron, Hisham Suliman as Abu Ahmad, Doron Ben-David as Steve, Rona-Lee Shimon as Nurit, Idan Amedi as Sagi, Laëtitia Eïdo as Shirin Al Abed, Tzachi Halevy as Naor, Doron Ben-David as Herzel, Yaakov Zada-Daniel as Eli, Boaz Konforty as Avihai, Itzik Cohen as Gaby, Yuval Segal as Mickey and Netta Garti as Gali. The antagonistic Abu Ahmad was based on Ibrahim Hamed, a Hamas commander who was convicted of murdering 54 Israelis.

During the second season, the cast was joined by Shadi Mar’i as Hamas leader Walid, Firas Nassar as ISIS leader Nidal ("Al Makdesi"), Amir Khoury as Samir, and Meirav Shirom as Dana. Returning cast members from the first season included Ben-David, Shimon, Amedi, Eïdo, Halevi, Ben-David, Zada-Daniel, Konforty, Cohen, Segal and Garti. Ëido also worked with an Arabic language instructor due to her lack of proficiency in the language.

During the third season, Konforty drew upon his Israel Defense Forces (IDF) military service experience while portraying his character Avihai, a sniper in Doron's squad. According to Shimon, cast members also performed their own stunts and received training in firearms, Krav Maga and kickboxing. New cast members included Marina Maximilian, who played a Shin Bet investigator.

During the fourth season, several regular cast members including Raz, Cohen, Shimon, Amedi, Ben-David, Zada-Daniel and Shirom reprised their roles. New cast members for the fourth season included Inbar Lavi, Mark Ivanir, Amir Boutrous, Lucy Ayoub and Loai Noufi.

In December 2024, Fauda's production instructed casting agents not to propose Jewish actors for roles portraying Arab characters in the fifth season as part of the show's commitment towards authenticity. In mid-April 2025, French actress Mélanie Laurent joined the cast of the fifth season as Anne.

=== Filming ===
The first season of Fauda was co-produced by Raz and Issacharoff, in partnership with Tender Productions. Most of the first season was filmed in the Israeli Arab village of Kfar Qasim for a month and half in 2014. Due to the ongoing 2014 Gaza War, shooting was cancelled for the first day but production resumed. The first season production hired a mixed cast and crew of Israeli Jews and Arabs.

During the filming of the second season, the producers granted access to a BBC film crew, resulting in the production of the 2018 documentary The Real Fauda. Filming also took place in an Israeli Arab town where female Jewish Israeli extras were cast as Palestinian women due to a local customary ban on female participation.

Filming for the third season commenced in March 2019. The third season was filmed in several Israeli Arab villages, Jaffa and IDF training zones over a period of three months. The IDF assisted the production with the scenes taking place in the Gaza Strip and also provided helicopters. To simulate Gaza, the production and art team built a set at Tze'elim, the IDF's Urban Warfare Army Camp. The Israeli Arab town of Jisr az-Zarqa also served as a stand-in for scenes in Gaza and West Bank.

The fourth season was filmed in several locations in Israel and the Ukraine from November 2021. Filming took place in the central Israeli Arab town of Kafr Qasim in December 2021, prompting complaints from several residents about the sound of explosions and gunfire. The production compensated residents living near the production site and coordinated with the Kafr Qasim municipal authorities and local police.

Filming for the fifth season had been planned for 2023 but was delayed due to the Gaza war. Filming for the fifth season took place in both Israel and Budapest in 2025. While parts of the fifth season were originally intended to be filmed in Marseille, they were moved to Budapest for security reasons by September 2025.

== Release ==
The first season of Fauda premiered on the satellite network yes in 2015. The series is distributed by the online streaming service Netflix, billed as a Netflix original program, and premiered on 2 December 2016.

In the summer of 2016, yes officially picked up season 2 of the show, stating it will focus more on real world events. During the fall of 2017 the initial trailer was released, and the official premier date was later announced to be 31 December. Season 2 was added to Netflix in May 2018.

A few weeks prior to the airing of season 2, Fauda was renewed for a third season, to air in 2019. The third season premiered on Yes Action's TV channel, VOD and YouTube channel on 30 December 2019. It premiered on Netflix on 16 April 2020.

The fourth season aired on yes TV and Netflix in early 2023.

The first two episodes of the fifth season aired on Yes Action and Yes VOD on May 18, 2026, with the remaining nine episodes being released on a weekly basis. On June 21, Yes TV warned that the seventh and eighth episodes, scheduled to be released on June 22, were based on the events of the October 7 attacks, and would contain "difficult" content, images and sounds. Viewers would be given the option to skip these two episodes and resume the ninth episode the following week, which would continue the season's main storyline. The fifth season was released on September 8.

== Reception ==
=== Viewership ===
According to BBC and CNN, Fauda has garnered significant popularity not only in Israel but in the Palestinian Territories and Arab countries as well between 2018 and 2019.

According to FlixPatrol, the fifth season ranked fourth among Netflix series globally September 10, 2026. Within the Middle East, Fauda was ranked as the most watched Netflix show in Lebanon, the second most-watched show in Jordan, the United Arab Emirates and Bahrain, the third most-watched show in Qatar, Oman and Kuwait, the fourth most-watched show in Egypt, the fifth most-watched show in Morocco, and the ninth most-watched show in Saudi Arabia. According to The Times of Israel and Honest Reporting, social media users globally praised the series for giving the Israeli perspective on the October 7 attacks.

=== Critical response ===
The review aggregator Rotten Tomatoes indicated that 100% of reviews were favourable for all four seasons.

==== Seasons One and Two ====
In a piece for The Guardian, film producer Trudie Styler found the series to be "an electric and fantastically acted drama", adding that "[the] moral context is complex and provides more fodder for dinner-table discussions."

Don Trachtman of The Times of Israel praised the series, writing that it "tries to level and equate the sides, without clear message of who is acting worse or who is right and who is wrong." He also compared Fauda favourably to similar American spy television series, observing the focus on drama over spectacle and special effects. Trachtman praised Fauda for humanising Israeli spies and commandos by depicting them as "humane, with personal lives, families, love, greif, [sic] consicence, [sic] doubts." He also opined that the second season improved on the first season by raising the stakes, level of suspense, and exploring the show's minor characters.

Paul Nyhart of TheWrap gave the series a positive review, describing it as next Homeland. He praised the second season for using Arabic and Hebrew dialogue to tell both sides of the story and for its positive representation of female characters. Nyhart also praised Fauda for its high stakes and action scenes.

Mihir Fadnavis of Firstpost gave the second series a positive review, writing that it "had huge expectations to live up to, and it's a matter of celebration that the follow-up is not just bigger, but also better. It is truly an unforgettable piece of entertainment that should be on the must-see list for those who dig films and TV that revel in the gray area rather than black or white." Fadnavis praised the series for focusing on the humanity and complexity of both its Israeli and Palestinian characters. While he credited the series for helping viewers understand the Arab-Israeli conflict, Fadnavis suggested that the series could also explore the political situation rather than relying on thrills. He also praised the second season's character development for exploring its individual character arcs and raising the stakes, comparing it favourably to the "stereotypical machine-gun trotting sexist joke spewing" trope of the first season's male characters.

==== Season Three ====
PJ Grisar of The Forward gave the third season a positive review, writing that "the show remains, above all, about fighters and their families. When it comes to them, Fauda still excels in its consistent, action-based character studies." He praised the surrogate father-and-son dynamic between Lior Raz's character Doron, an undercover IDF operative, and Ala Dakka's character Bashar, the son of the antagonistic Palestinian militant leader Jihad Hamdan (Khalifa Natour).

Esther Kustanowitz of J. The Jewish News of Northern California gave the third season a mixed review, writing that it "delivered the dramatic tautness and moral murkiness" of the previous two seasons. However, she criticised what she regarded as "unnecessary" love scenes, the confusing multiple character arcs and abandoned "possible plot points." Kustanowitz praised the series' subtitles for their adapt translation of Hebrew slang including references to The Exodus and Judaism.

Eric Kohn of IndieWire gave the third season a B+ grade, writing that "the show's moral implications gain texture, as its undercover agent becomes more of a problem than a solution." He praised the third season for being more morally ambiguous than the first two seasons by exploring the moral implications and psychological toll of Doron's undercover work as an IDF agent, describing Doron's downward character arc as a Kohn also praised the third season for featuring more Palestinian characters such as Bashar in its Gaza Strip setting but criticized the lack of Palestinian input during the screenwriting process.

Emad Moussa of Mondoweiss gave the third season a negative review, describing it as "clumsy hasbara in the imagined Gaza dystopia." He criticized the third season for perpetuating negative stereotypes of Palestinians and Gaza, and for relegating Palestinian characters to the "backstage." Moussa highlighted several cultural inaccuracies including the use of the Arabic greeting "habibi" and said that the series minimised Israeli human rights abuses and the impact of the Israeli blockade of the Gaza Strip. Moussa also argued that the third season served as a propaganda tool for whitewashing the record of the Israeli Defense Forces and Shin Bet following real-life incidents such as the 2006 capture of Gilad Shalit and the assassination of Hamas commander Ahmed Jabari.

==== Season Four ====
Itay Ziv of Haaretz gave a positive review of the fourth season, writing that it captured the Israeli "zetgeist." He described the series "as one of the most important channels to understand the Israeli occupation."

Kelly Luchtman of Foreign Crime Drama praised the fourth season's writing as superior to the third season, writing that "making the mission personal and taking the team out of Israel made it feel like a progression of the story." While critical of the slower pacings and two "filler" episodes, Luchtman praised the series She praised the showrunners for balancing action scenes with the characters' personal and family struggles. Luchtman also observed that the series went beyond the binary narrative of good Israelis versus evil terrorists by exploring how the Israeli protagonists "will go to any length to stop terrorism, even ruining lives and families in the process."

Adam Sweeting of The Arts Desk awarded the fourth season four stars, writing "fourth time around, the human cost is becoming too much to bear." He praised the performance of Lior Raz as the main protagonist Doron, observing that the writer and co-producer was able to draw upon his experiences as a real-life Israeli counter-terrorism unit veteran. Sweeting praised the fourth season for exploring the bonds between Doron and his comrades as well as their various personal struggles. He also observed that the season explored the themes of trust and betrayal, particularly the sibling relationship between the antagonistic Omar (Amir Boutrous) and Israeli-Arab policewoman Maya Binyamin (Lucy Ayoub) and the hostage-captor relationship between Gabi and Omar.

PJ Grisar of The Forward praised director Omri Givon and writer Noah Stallman for exploring the cost of combat on the series' IDF protagonists and questioning the wisdom of the IDF's tactics. He was however critical of the fourth season for not probing the impact of Israeli military surveillance on the Palestinians and the wreckage of the IDF team's home lives. Grisar praised the fourth season's climax for exploring the impact of Israeli collateral damage on the show's Palestinian characters.

Shania Matthews of ThePrint gave the fourth season four stars, describing it as "a gut-wrenching and intense series finale." She praised the series for "unlayering" its characters particularly the main protagonist Doron, exploring his past and emotional stability. Matthews praised the fourth season for continuing the series' stellar action performances, "sensitive interpretation of a tense geopolitical landscape," and ability to reinvent its story over successive seasons. She also praised the series for raising awareness of life in the Occupied Territories, humanising its Palestinian characters and showcasing Palestinian talent to Israeli audiences.

Ambar Chatterjee of EastMojo gave the series four out of five stars, describing it as "a thrilling journey through conflict and identity." He wrote that the fourth season "maintains the same structure as the previous three seasons, but the story expands to include a diverse range of characters, dramatic precursors, locations, and individuals from both sides of the conflict." Chatterjee also praised the new Arab-Israeli character of Maya for "embodying the torment and internal conflict experienced by individuals who find themselves torn between loyalties and identity."

==== Season Five ====
Smadar Shiloni of Ynetnews reviewed the first two episodes of the fifth season, writing "It is no longer so much a series about the Middle East conflict as it is about people trying to rise from the wreckage and clinging to one another in an effort to stay alive." He gave a mixed review of the performances of the cast, describing Lior Raz's character Doron Kabillo as a "somewhat exaggerated character" but praised the other actors for embodying an image of "stunned, shattered masculinity."

Gila Isaacson of JFeed gave the fifth season a positive review, praising the overseas setting in Marseille for decentering the Israeli state apparatus setting. She also praised Bian Anteer's performance as the Bedouin tracker character Salem. Isaacson also lauded the series for complicating the binary between good and evil by focusing on the "grey space" between the Israeli and Palestinian worlds. She wrote: "Season 5 adds one more layer: what happens when those survivors stop trusting the system that made them, and turn inward toward the only loyalty that still feels real."

Jake Wallis Simons of The Jewish Chronicle gave the fifth season a positive review, comparing it favourably to the controversial documentary NAZA. He said that the series' story was based on reality and argued that it did more to explain the October 7 attacks to viewers than two years of Israeli public diplomacy.

Azad Essa of the Middle East Eye gave the fifth season a negative review, describing it as an "exercise in genocidal apologia". He wrote that it demonized Muslim immigrants in Europe by playing on Islamophobic tropes, including depicting Palestinian solidarity as a gateway to terrorism. Essa was critical of French actress and director Melanie Laurent's character Anne Aubert, whom he argued was depicted as a "misinformed" Palestinian sympathizer who switched sides after learning about her late husband Maher Zeytoun's (Carlos Gharzuzi) true identity as a brutal Hamas commander during the October 7 attacks. Essa also criticised the fifth season for erasing the Gaza genocide and Gazans while focusing solely on Israeli victimhood and vengeance.

The Economist gave the fifth season a critical review, arguing that it could only capture part of the truth of the October 7 attacks and the Gaza conflict.

Adam Sweeting of The Arts Desk gave the fifth season a positive review, awarding it four out of five stars. He praised the performance of Melania Laurent as Anne Aubert writing that she "adds new colours to the mix" by shedding light on how the Israel-Palestine conflict can be seen as "incomprehensible" from a European perspective and adding a "human perspective that often gets lost in the ongoing struggle." Despite praising the screenwriting and production values, Sweeting expressed concern that the fifth season was more tilted towards the Israeli perspective than earlier seasons and did not address the high human cost of Israel's military actions during the Gaza war. Similarly, Hillel Schenker observed that the fifth season only focused on the Israeli perspective unlike earlier seasons, which tried to show both perspectives.

=== Political commentary ===
==== Palestinian perspectives ====
Various pro-Palestinian groups have labeled Fauda as an "Israeli propaganda". Rachel Shabi, writing in The Guardian, criticised the show for its politics and its "relentless machismo". According to Yasmeen Serhan of The Atlantic, "Viewers who are hungry for a Palestinian perspective on the conflict would do well to urge Netflix to commission a Palestinian-created series, because Fauda will probably prove a disappointment." George Zeidan of Right to Movement Palestine, was more direct; in Haaretz, he wrote "The Middle East is already bursting with disinformation, insinuations and dangerous propaganda: there's no need for yet more. Fauda can do better."

An article by Yara Hawari in Al Jazeera about the "latest surge of programmes focusing on Israel and trying to show it as a force for good" gave the opinion that "although not as crude as classic Orientalist cinema and TV, these programmes are no less racist and perhaps even more dangerous in their subtlety and slick presentation." York University philosophy professor Muhammad Ali Khalidi described the series "as an effective tool of Israeli propaganda," comparing it to the 1960 Hollywood film Exodus. Khalidi said the series whitewashed Israeli human rights violations and the military occupation, and accused it of cultural appropriation. Reviewers have described it as "shooting and crying".

==== Jewish and Israeli perspectives ====
Jewish critics of Israel have also critiqued Fauda. Alessio Franko of Jewish Currents complimented the series for attempting to humanize its Palestinian characters but conceded that it was still locked into an Israel-Jewish point of view; observing that Palestinian characters were not accorded the same "embattled, contemplative moments" as their Jewish counterparts. Mitchell Abidor described Fauda as "poisonous politically, presenting Palestinians as murderous, cowardly, treacherous, and untrustworthy. The Israelis, on the other hand, are either supermen or superwomen." He opined that the series' efforts to humanize its Palestinian characters was negated by its role as an "apologia" for Israel's war on the Palestinians.

Pro-Israeli critics also panned the show as depicting Israelis in a bad light. In Tablet Magazine, Alter Yisrael Shimon Feuerman states:

Doron, then, isn’t a new Zionist hero negating the old nebbishy Jewish stereotypes. He’s merely a curious new form of the Jew as schlemiel, only this time with the powerful fisticuffs and a high-powered rifle. He is, in short, the kind of character my mother warned me against when I watched Hogan’s Heroes, a buffoon who turns a painful and serious and all-too-real conflict into a bit of entertainment.

Tablet magazine notes that both pro-Israeli and pro-Palestinian critics complain that the show is biased against their points of view, an indication that it is evenhanded. Writer Josef Joffe notes:

To begin, the protagonists look, walk, dress and speak the same, with Palestinians and Israeli switching smoothly from Hebrew to Arabic, and vice versa. Their common bond are those classic Arabic swear words centering on the sexual depravity of one’s mother. It doesn’t require a subtle mind to get the subtext: Look how alike we are.

Nor does Fauda squelch the voices of the Palestinian. They keep articulating their grievances and their claims to justice. They love their children, and they cry over their fallen. No black and white hats here. The Jews defend their homeland; the Arab kill because they want one. Both sides believe they are in the right, though the Hamas types also invoke Allah. Both feast and fornicate. They have families and rebellious sons. In-group power struggles keep overwhelming the existential national conflict. They go after each other as they plot their next attack on the enemy.

=== Accolades ===
In 2016, the show took six awards, including Best Drama Series, at the Israeli Academy Awards. In December 2017, The New York Times voted Fauda among the best international shows of 2017. In 2018, the show took 11 Israeli TV Academy Awards, including best TV drama, best actor for Lior Raz and also best screenplay, casting, cinematography, recording, special effects and in other categories.

== Adaptations and responses ==
In November 2019, content studio Applause Entertainment (promoted by Aditya Birla Group) announced an Indian adaptation of Fauda, which would depict the relationship between India and Pakistan. Tanaav, the Indian adaptation, premiered on SonyLIV on 11 November 2022.

In early 2022, the Hamas-affiliated Al-Aqsa TV produced a television series called Qabdat al-Ahrar ("Fist of the Free") as a Palestinian response to Fauda. The series was directed by Mohammed Soraya and consisted of 30 episodes. It focused on a gang of Hamas fighters outmaneuvering the IDF.

In October 2025 Israel's Channel 12 reported that the series would be made into a feature film, but neither Raz nor Issacharoff confirmed this. In September 2026 Issacharoff said a film was "in the works".

== Gaza war ==
Series production manager Matan Meir, a reservist in the IDF, was killed by a bomb trap in a Hamas tunnel in the Gaza Strip on 11 November 2023, while deployed during the Gaza war.

Idan Amedi, who appeared in Seasons 2-4 as Sagi, was severely injured in Gaza on 8 January 2024 while serving as a reservist in the IDF. A blast that was the result of a premature explosion intended to demolish tunnels killed six soldiers and resulted in shrapnel hitting Amedi in his neck and spine. Amedi has stated that he hopes to return to Fauda for Season 5.

== See also ==
- Bethlehem
- Hostages (Israeli TV series)
- Television in Israel
- Prisoners of War
