= Dirty Angels =

2024 film by Martin Campbell

- Theatrical release poster
- Directed by: Martin Campbell
- Screenplay by: Alissa Sullivan Haggis; Jonas McCord
- Story by: Jonas McCord; Martin Campbell
- Produced by: Moshe Diamant; Yariv Lerner; Robert Van Norden
- Starring: Eva Green; Maria Bakalova; Ruby Rose; Rona-Lee Shimon; Jojo T. Gibbs
- Cinematography: David Tattersall
- Edited by: James Page
- Music by: Rupert Parkes
- Production companies: Millennium Media; Nu Boyana Film Studios
- Distributed by: Lionsgate
- Release date: December 13, 2024
- Running time: 104 minutes
- Country: United States
- Language: English
- Budget: €35 million

Dirty Angels is a 2024 American action thriller film directed by Martin Campbell, with a script co-written by Campbell, Alissa Sullivan Haggis, and Jonas McCord. It stars Eva Green, Maria Bakalova, Rona-Lee Shimon, Ruby Rose, and Jojo T. Gibbs. It was released in theaters and video on demand on December 13, 2024.

== Plot ==
During the U.S. withdrawal from Afghanistan, a group of terrorists storms a girls' school in Quetta, Pakistan, capturing several students including Badia, who is the daughter of Afghanistan's Minister of Education, and the U.S. Ambassador's daughter. Some girls initially escape to the rooftop, but are eventually captured. The terrorists demand $10 million ransom per hostage and the release of a prisoner named Sheik Al-Shimali.

After a failed rescue attempt by Delta Force, the U.S. military devises a new plan. They recruit Jake, a female soldier, to lead a rescue mission. Travis, her boss, assembles a team of skilled women including Rocky (a mechanic), Geek (a technician), Shooter (a weapon specialist), The Bomb (an explosive specialist), Medic, along with Dr. Mike. They pose as medical personnel to infiltrate the region.

The Afghan Minister of Education helps them cross the border, though she also plans to pay ransom for her daughter. The team conducts various operations, including raiding a weapons cache. During these missions, they suffer casualties including Dr. Mike and Travis. They also discover that one of their local contacts, Awina, is actually informing the terrorists of their movements.

The team manages to rescue Sheik Al-Shimali from prison transport but loses Rocky in the process. They then attempt to use Sheik Al-Shimali and counterfeit money to negotiate, but the terrorist leader discovers the fake money. This leads to a final assault on the terrorists' cave base.

During the climactic rescue, Jake confronts and kills the terrorist leader while The Bomb leads the captured girls to safety. Though they successfully rescue the hostages and evacuate them by helicopter, several team members are lost in the process. The film ends with Jake and Malik choosing to return to rescue Geek, who stayed behind to cover their escape.

== Cast ==
- Eva Green as Jake
- Ruby Rose as Medic
- Maria Bakalova as The Bomb
- Rona-Lee Shimon as Mechanic
- Jojo T. Gibbs as Geek
- Emily Bruni as Shooter
- Christopher Backus as Travis
- Zoha Rahman as Malalai
- Laëtitia Eïdo as Awina
- Aziz Çapkurt as Abbas
- George Iskandar as Amir
- Reza Brojerdi as Malik
- Edmund Kingsley as Dr. Mike
- Claudia Roldan as Jessie
- May Kurtz as Badia

== Production ==
In September 2022, it was announced that Martin Campbell would be directing the film, with Eva Green attached to star. In November, it was reported that Ruby Rose, Maria Bakalova, Rona-Lee Shimon and Jonica T. Gibbs had joined the cast. Christopher Backus joined the film's cast in December.

Principal photography began in December 2022 in Morocco and Millennium Media's Nu Boyana Film Studios in Thessaloniki, Greece, and concluded in February 2023.

== Release ==
Dirty Angels was released in theaters and video on demand on December 13, 2024.

== Reception ==
The film holds a 29% "Rotten" score on review aggregator Rotten Tomatoes, based on 21 reviews with an average rating of 4.6/10.
