= Lucy Ayoub =

Arab-Israeli journalist

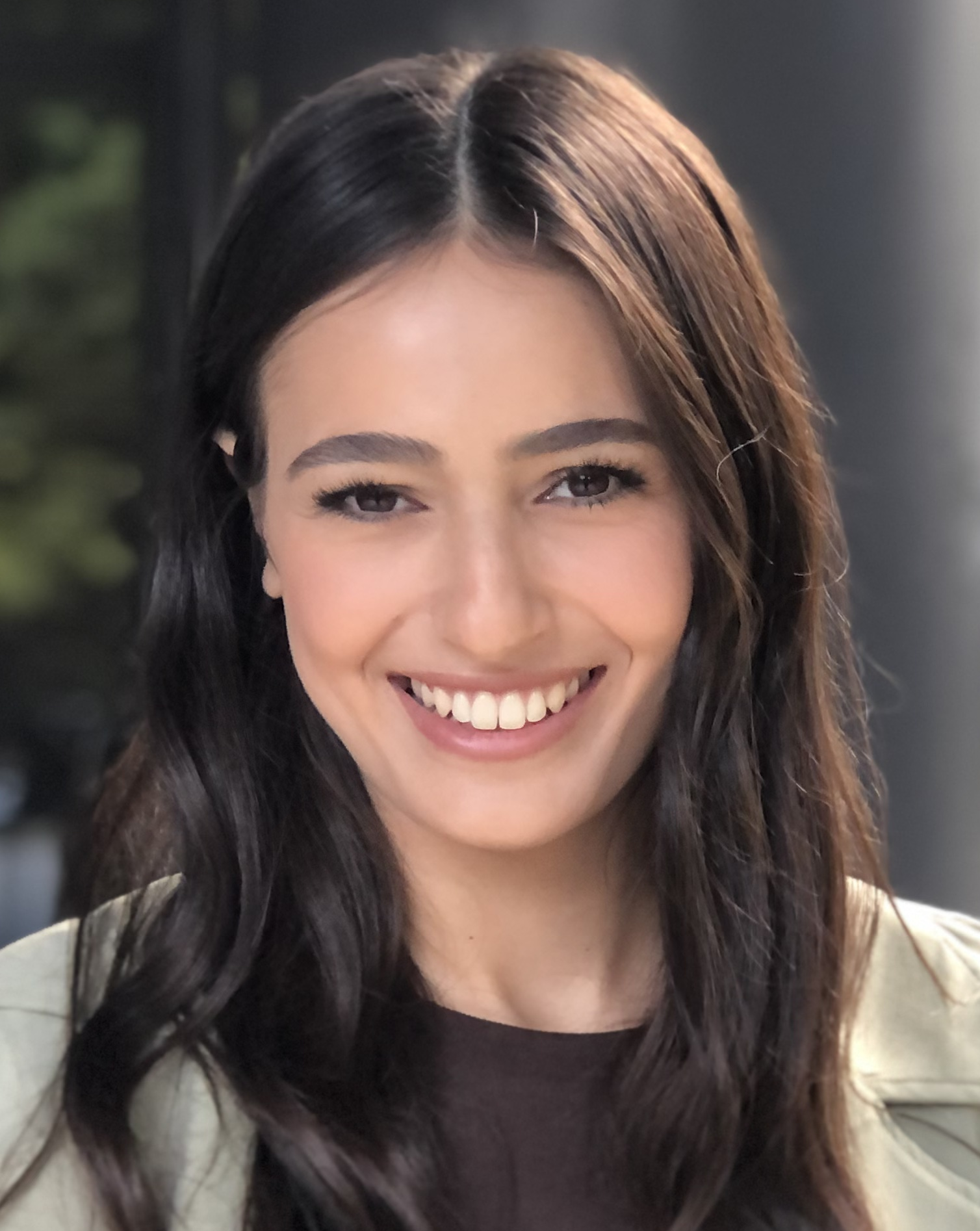
- Ayoub in 2020
- Born: June 21, 1992 (age 34); Hadar HaCarmel, Haifa, Israel
- Education: Tel Aviv University
- Occupations: Television presenter, radio presenter
- Years active: 2016–present
- Employers: Israeli Public Broadcasting Corporation (2016–2021); Keshet Media Group (2021–present)
- Partner: Etay Bar

Lucy Ayoub (Arabic: لوسي أيوب; Hebrew: לוסי איוב; born 21 June 1992) is an Israeli television presenter, poet and radio host, formerly of the Israeli Public Broadcasting Corporation (IPBC) and currently working for Keshet Media Group. Ayoub co-hosted the Eurovision Song Contest 2019 alongside Assi Azar, Bar Refaeli and Erez Tal.

== Early life ==
Ayoub was born in Haifa, Israel. She is the daughter of an Arab-Christian father, and an Ashkenazi Jewish mother who converted to Christianity upon their marriage. Ayoub has one brother and three sisters. Her paternal grandmother was the daughter of Palestinian refugees who fled to Lebanon during the 1948 Arab-Israeli War. She was left in a convent in Israel, and later was adopted by a wealthy Arab-Christian woman named Lucy Khayat. Her maternal grandparents were Holocaust survivors: her maternal grandfather was sent to a Nazi concentration camp, while her maternal grandmother from Romania survived among partisans as a child. Ayoub celebrates both the Christian and Jewish holidays with different parts of her family although she says she is an atheist: "I’m an atheist and it means nothing to me that I was baptized [in church]". She attended a Catholic Carmelites school in Haifa. She wrote stories and poems in both Arabic and Hebrew.

Ayoub enlisted in the Israel Defense Forces, serving for two years as a flight simulator instructor in the Israeli Air Force.

In 2016, she began studying philosophy, politics, economics, and law at the Tel Aviv University.

== Career ==
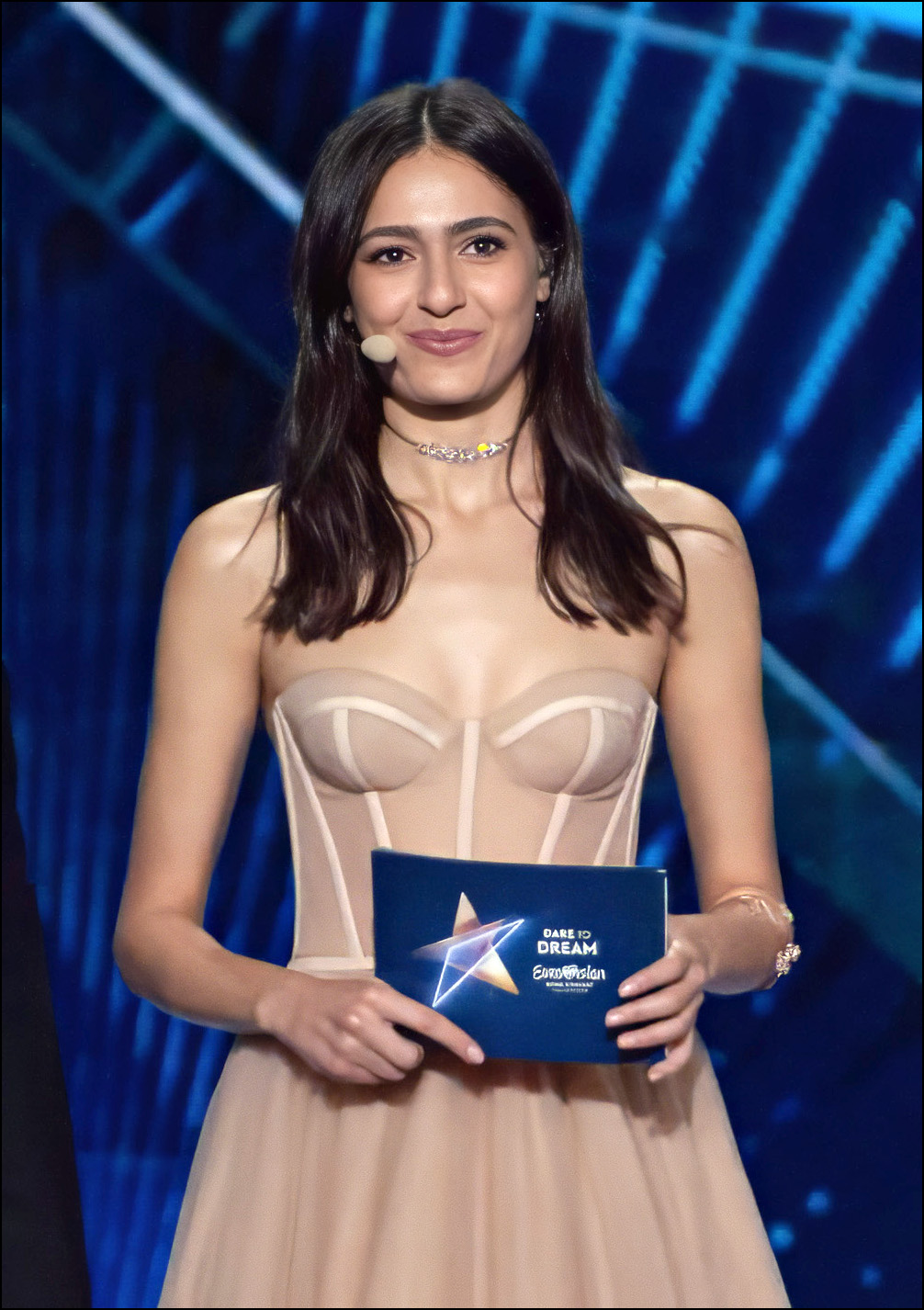
Ayoub hosting the Eurovision Song Contest 2019 in Tel Aviv

She first gained public attention in 2016, when she read several pieces of her poetry in the framework of the Poetry Slam Israel competition. In the same year, she joined the Israeli Public Broadcasting Corporation (IPBC) and started writing and submitting videos. In 2017, Ayoub began to host a weekly cultural programme on the radio station. In the same year, she began hosting the daily TV programme Culture Club on Kan 11.

Ayoub was the jury spokesperson for Israel in the Eurovision Song Contest 2018, where her presentation caused a media reaction due to the response of the Israeli Minister of Culture and Sport, Miri Regev, who protested against the fact that Ayoub spoke Arabic during the live broadcast and did not mention Jerusalem.

Ayoub hosted the green room (artists' backstage) of the Eurovision Song Contest 2019 in Tel Aviv alongside Assi Azar, whereas Erez Tal and Bar Refaeli hosted the main event. Before that, on 28 January, Ayoub and Azar hosted the contest's semi-final allocation draw at the Tel Aviv Museum of Art.

She plays a key role in the fourth season of the Netflix series Fauda as an Israeli Arab police officer married to a Jew.

In November 2021, she announced her departure from the IPBC for Keshet.

== Personal life ==
She resides in Tel Aviv with her Jewish-Israeli boyfriend Etay Bar. She is now married to Bar.

Ayoub speaks Arabic and Hebrew. In a poem she says of her self-identity: "[S]ome of you will say I will always be the daughter of the Arab, and at the same time, in the eyes of others, I will always be the daughter of the Jewess. So do not suddenly tell me that I can not be both."

== See also ==
- List of Eurovision Song Contest presenters

Preceded by (Portugal) Sílvia Alberto, Daniela Ruah, Catarina Furtado and Filomena Cautela	Eurovision Song Contest presenter 2019; With: Erez Tal, Bar Refaeli and Assi Azar	Succeeded by (Netherlands) Edsilia Rombley, Chantal Janzen, Jan Smit and Nikkie de Jager (2021)
