= A Matter of Size =

- Theatrical release poster
- סיפור גדול
- Directed by: Sharon Maymon; Erez Tadmor
- Produced by: Tami Leon; Chilik Michaeli; Oliver Simon; Franziska An der Gassen
- Starring: Itzik Cohen; Dvir Benedek; Alon Dahan
- Release date: 27 April 2009
- Running time: 90 minutes
- Country: Israel
- Languages: Hebrew, Japanese

A Matter of Size (Hebrew: סיפור גדול, Sipur Gadol, lit: "A Big Story") is a 2009 Israeli comedy-drama film directed by Sharon Maymon and Erez Tadmor.

== Plot ==
Herzl Mesika is an obese man who struggles unsuccessfully to lose weight. When he starts a new job in a Japanese restaurant he is introduced to the sport of Sumo wrestling. Herzl decides to use his weight to his advantage by founding Israel's first Sumo wrestling team of four.

== Cast ==
- Itzik Cohen - Herzl
- Dvir Benedek - Aharon
- Alon Dahan - Gidi
- Shmulik Cohen - Sami
- Irit Kaplan - Zehava
- Togo Igawa - Kitano
- Levana Finkelstein - Mona Mesika
- Evelin Hagoel - Geula

== Awards and nominations ==
The film was nominated for 2009 Ophir Awards in 13 categories an won won three of them: Best Actress (Irit Kaplan), Best Supporting Actress (Levana Finkelstein), and Costume Design (Inbal Shuki).

It was the Audience Award winner at the 2009 Karlovy Vary Film Festival.
