= The Terminal List: Dark Wolf =

American action thriller television series

- Promotional poster
- Genre: Action; Conspiracy thriller; Drama; Spy thriller
- Created by: Jack Carr; David DiGilio
- Based on: The Terminal List by Jack Carr
- Showrunner: David DiGilio
- Starring: Taylor Kitsch; Tom Hopper; Chris Pratt
- Composer: Ruth Barrett
- Country of origin: United States
- Original language: English
- No. of seasons: 1
- No. of episodes: 7

Production
- Executive producers: Chris Pratt; David DiGilio; Antoine Fuqua; Jack Carr; Max Adams; Jared Shaw; Kat Samick; Taylor Kitsch; Frederick E. O. Toye
- Producers: Gwyn Shovelski; Kenny Sheard; Erika Milutin; Gergö Balika
- Cinematography: David Stockton; Matt Windon
- Running time: 49–67 minutes
- Production companies: Indivisible Productions; Hill District Media; DiGilio Films; Civic Center Media; MRC Television; Amazon MGM Studios

Original release
- Network: Amazon Prime Video
- Release: August 27 – September 24, 2025

Related
- The Terminal List

The Terminal List: Dark Wolf is an American action thriller television series based on characters from the 2018 novel The Terminal List by Jack Carr. Created by Carr and David DiGilio, the series is a prequel to The Terminal List, in which the story follows Ben Edwards throughout his journey as a Navy SEAL to the CIA delving into the darker side of warfare and its human cost.

Taylor Kitsch reprises his role as Edwards from The Terminal List and stars alongside Chris Pratt, reprising his role as James Reece, and Tom Hopper.

The Terminal List: Dark Wolf premiered on August 27, 2025, on Amazon Prime Video.

== Cast and characters ==
=== Main ===
- Taylor Kitsch as Chief Special Warfare Operator Benjamin "Ben" Edwards a.k.a. Charlie Zero-Two/0-2, a US Navy SEAL and Troop Chief in Charlie Platoon, SEAL Team 5.
- Tom Hopper as Lieutenant Raife Hastings a.k.a. Charlie Zero-One/0-1, a US Navy SEAL and Troop Commander of Charlie Platoon, SEAL Team 5 with familial connections to the Selous Scouts, originating from Rhodesia.
- Chris Pratt as Lieutenant James Reece a.k.a. Alpha Zero-One/0-1, a US Navy SEAL and Troop Commander of Alpha Platoon, SEAL Team 7.

=== Recurring ===
- Dar Salim as Major Mohammed "Mo" Farooq, an Iraqi Special Operations Forces (ISOF) officer and later CIA contractor.
- Luke Hemsworth as Jules Landry, a CIA officer and later contractor.
- Robert Wisdom as Jed Haverford, a CIA Iranian Operations Division spymaster, former 1st Cavalry Division soldier, and Beirut Embassy bombing survivor.
- Rona-Lee Shimon as Eliza Perash, a veteran Mossad operative romantically involved with Edwards.
- Shiraz Tzarfati as Tal Varon, a Mossad Cyber and Forgery division operative.
- Alain Ali Washnevsky as Cyrus Rahimi, a senior Iranian nuclear deal negotiator.
- Hadi Khanjanpour as Vahid Rahimi, a junior Iranian nuclear deal negotiator based in Austria and Cyrus' brother.
- Ray Haratian as Yousef Saedi, the Iranian Foreign Minister.

=== Guest ===
- Jared Shaw as Special Warfare Operator First Class Ernest "Boozer" Vickers a.k.a. Charlie Zero-Six/0-6, the Charlie Platoon, Sniper element.
- LaMonica Garrett as Commander William "Bill" Cox, commander of the SEAL mission in Operation Inherent Resolve.
- Chris Diamantopoulos as Aaron Fuller, a senior CIA officer based at Forward Operating Base Poe, Iraq.
- Fady Demian as Sergeant Daran Amiri, an Iraqi Security Forces (ISF) officer.
- Michael Ealy as Ish Reinhart, a former Green Beret and a seasoned CIA operative.
- Betty Gilpin as Amy Edwards, Edwards' wife.
- Pablo Schreiber as Hank "Dash" Dashnaw, a former Delta Force soldier turned CIA/SAC Ground Branch operator, Edwards' friend.
- Eric Colvin as Balázs Molnar, Geology Professor and nuclear researcher at Budapest University of Technology, with a novel uranium enrichment technique secretly for sale to Iran.

== Episodes ==
No.	Title	Directed by	Written by	Original release date
1	"Inherent Resolve"	Frederick E. O. Toye	Story by : David DiGilio and Jack Carr; Teleplay by : David DiGilio	August 27, 2025
In 2015, Ben Edwards leads SEAL Team 5 Charlie Platoon assisting Iraqi Security Forces and ISOF fighting against ISIS as part of Operation Inherent Resolve. A botched prisoner exchange results in ISIS leader Hamid Al-Jabouri escaping and ISF sergeant Amiri being injured. Three months later at a FOB outside Mosul, Edwards is joined by James Reece, whose SEAL Team 7 Alpha Platoon will be taking over training Iraqi troops. CIA officers Fuller and Landry brief the SEALs that Massoud Danawi, a Lebanese arms dealer working with ISIS is in Mosul. Danawi threatens Amiri's family, forcing him to smuggle explosives onto the FOB in his prosthesis, detonating in the mess hall and killing seven people. ISOF major Farooq obtains intel that Al-Jabouri orchestrated the attack with Danawi. Edwards deduces Al-Jabouri is an asset being protected by the CIA to gather intel on the arms dealer. Unable to kill him, Lieutenant Hastings proposes they expose Al-Jabouri as an asset. However, on a capture mission to his compound, Edwards discovers he has taken Amiri's young daughter Zaynab as a sex slave, and executes him.
2	"The Audition"	Frederick E. O. Toye	Max Adams	August 27, 2025
As punishment, both Edwards and Hastings are stripped of rank and discharged, but avoid court martial and prison. Reece is spared, and remains in Iraq. During an extended layover in Frankfurt, they are approached by CIA spymaster Jed Haverford. He tells them he buried a witness statement to assist their Al-Jabouri coverup, and recruits them for an operation against Danawi, who is now in Europe working for Iran. A pathway back to his former role is promised to Edwards, and Hastings assured his general discharge will be changed to an honorable discharge. In Vienna they are briefed by Haverford and Mossad operative Tal Varon. The three intercept a meeting between Danawi and Quds Force financier Artem Gulabev at a nightclub in Krems. Eliza Perash, another Mossad operative inside the club, provides them Brügger & Thomet VP9 suppressed pistols. Danawi forces Perash to drink a spiked water, causing them to be made when Edwards saves her. After a shootout, Varon and Perash clean the scene. Edwards and Hastings chase and kill Danawi, retrieving his phone. Haverford congratulates them on passing their audition.
3	"What's Past Is Prologue"	Liz Friedlander	Naomi Iizuka and Max Adams	August 27, 2025
Vahid and Cyrus Rahimi attend a conference on the Iranian nuclear agreement in Geneva, later meeting with minister Yousef Saedi. Farooq, Landry and another CIA officer Ish Reinhart join Haverford's team. Danawi's phone shows he received $5 million in cryptocurrency to deliver to Balaz Molnar, a nuclear physics professor in Budapest. Texts come through from another number identified as Thana Haddad. Farooq questions her and discovers she is Danawi's estranged daughter, but can't bring himself to follow orders to kill her. Varon agrees not to tell the others after he confesses that as a teenager his sisters were raped by Uday Hussein, but he later helped the Americans in eliminating him. Edwards and Perash bond, but he becomes more estranged from his wife stateside. Impersonating Danawi, Farooq meets with Molnar and purchases proof of concept for proprietary bearings he is selling to Iran, which will enable them to still enrich uranium with the smaller number of centrifuges mandated by the nuclear deal. A third party team tail Farooq after the meeting until he is extracted by Landry, and one kills Reinhart. Edwards has Varon cut CCTV and guns the man down on the Budapest Metro, taking a photo for identification before being extracted himself.
4	"The Sound of the Guns"	Liz Friedlander	Kenny Sheard	September 3, 2025
Hastings' father puts him in contact with a CIA friend from his Selous Scouts days, who confirms Haverford manages a long term asset in Tehran codenamed "Shepherd". Minister Saedi thanks Cyrus for his clandestine work, but Vahid begins to question their actions of putting nuclear weapons in the hands of such men. The team relocates to Munich, discovering the third party is the nuclear proliferation Khalid Network, working to move the bearings into Iran before the nuclear deal is finalised. Haverford plans to intercept the convoy in Geneva and swap Molnar's bearings for fakes, rendering Iran's new facility useless. He assures a suspicious Hastings that Shepherd's intel is legitimate. Edwards and Perash kiss whilst scouting a location. Varon secures the fake bearings from Mossad agent Mordechai Ofer. Hastings becomes concerned about collateral damage with the convoy ambush plan and Edwards' change in attitude. Edwards argues their current posting allows them to take real action compared to serving under military red tape. Haverford kills Molnar. Impersonating Austrian Federal Police, the team attacks the Khalid Network convoy and obtains the bearings, but are met by a hostile quick reaction force on exfil. Farooq is injured and extracted by Landry. The Israelis betray the team, hacking Haverford's phone and stealing the bearings after incapacitating Edwards.
5	"E & E"	Paul Cameron	Hennah Sekander	September 10, 2025
Edwards confronts Perash in Zurich and retrieves the bearings. She insists Mossad didn't plan the attack and her and Varon's real mission is to investigate Haverford, who they believe is being manipulated by Shepherd. The two are attacked by a Persian-speaking tactical team, who Perash believes was sent by Shepherd, but escape after an intense gunfight. Whilst recovering in a safe house, Perash tells Edwards she never intended to kill him, even if her mission demanded it. Varon hacks the secure portal used by Haverford to communicate with Shepherd, tracing it to an apartment in Munich. She is attacked by the occupant, but eventually kills him and leaves with his laptop. Hastings tortures an operative captured from the convoy, who before dying reveals he is not Khalid Network but BND and the subsequent attackers were not affiliated with German intelligence. Hastings is distraught upon hearing this, unsuccessfully attempting to save the man. Edwards and Perash leave Zurich rendezvous with the team, but are attacked by a pair of assassins who kill the latter with a bomb. Edwards kills both men, and recovers a bracelet made by her daughter from Perash's body before fleeing the scene.
6	"Pawns & Kings"	Paul Cameron	Jared Shaw & Max Adams	September 17, 2025
Cyrus assures Saedi he will have the bearings the following day. Saedi criticises Vahid's enamoration with the West. Edwards reunites with the team in Stein. Hastings confirms the bearings they retrieved are also fakes. Haverford admits Shepherd played them to stop the BND's own disruption operation. He states Vahid Rahimi, now in custody, is Shepherd, and ordered the team killed in a panic to cover his own tracks, fearing Saedi would discover his actions. Haverford forces Vahid to confirm the bearings exchange point with Cyrus, then executes him. Mossad tells Varon Haverford terminated Shepherd, but she analyses the laptop and sees further portal activity after Vahid's execution. Hastings, disillusioned with their actions, fails to convince Edwards to walk away with him. Farooq, Landry and Edwards, impersonating KN couriers, meet Saedi at an airstrip. He tests the bearings, which are revealed to be genuine. Haverford is shown to be working with Cyrus, the real Shepherd. By having the bearings deal proceed, Cyrus can made Foreign Minister, replace hardliner Saedi and improve Iranian-Western relations as a CIA plant. Varon sends proof of this to the team, prompting them to attack Saedi's plane before it departs, killing him and his Quds Force bodyguards and retrieving the bearings. Haverford reports the team as rogue traitors to the CIA Director to cover his own back. Reuniting with Varon, they prepare to prove Haverford's treachery.
7	"The Wolf You Feed"	Paul Cameron	Jack Carr & David DiGilio	September 24, 2025
Two months after the airport attack, Hastings attempts to accuse Haverford of treason to the CIA, but fails due to lack of Edwards's support. Edwards was holed up in Germany, preparing his forces. Working with Varon, he planned to hold off the Iranian forces sent by Haverford, giving Varon time to hack into Haverford's servers and steal evidence to clear his team's name. When the enemy forces arrived, Edwards faced them alone but was trapped. Farooq privately informed Reece, who arrived with several members of his own unit to rescue Edwards and retrieve the bearings. Edwards reunites with Varon, Farooq, and Landry. They decide to take down their enemies one by one; Landry kills Artem, Farooq kills Cyrus with a bomb, and Edwards uses the evidence he gathers to bring Haverford to the police. Edwards returned Perash's bracelet to Perash's daughter. Afterward, Edwards bought a boat and prepared to drift around. He was approached by Hank "Dash" Dashnaw, a former friend and CIA/SAC Ground Branch operator. Dashnaw recruited him to join the Ground Branch. Edwards eventually accepted the offer and passed the test.

== Production ==
=== Development ===
In early February 2023, it was announced that a prequel series focusing on Ben Edwards was in development at Amazon Prime Video with Kitsch confirmed to be reprising his role as Edwards.

In January 2024, it was announced that the series would be officially titled The Terminal List: Dark Wolf. Both Jack Carr and David DiGilio co-created and executive-produced the series, with DiGilio serving as showrunner. The series is also executive-produced by Kitsch, Chris Pratt, Antoine Fuqua, Kat Samick, Max Adams, Jared Shaw, and Frederick E. O. Toye.

=== Casting ===
In February 2023, it was announced that both Pratt and Shaw would reprise their roles as James Reece and Ernest "Boozer" Vickers respectively. In January 2024, Tom Hopper was cast as a series regular for the series. In February 2024, Luke Hemsworth had joined the cast in a recurring role. In March 2024, Dar Salim, Robert Wisdom, Shiraz Tzarfati, and Rona-Lee Shimon were cast in recurring roles.

=== Filming ===
Principal photography for The Terminal List: Dark Wolf began on March 13, 2024. Scenes were filmed in Budapest, Esztergom and Szentendre, Hungary.

== Release ==
The series premiered on August 27, 2025, and consisted of 7 episodes. The first three episodes premiered the same day, with the remaining episodes released weekly through September 24, 2025.

== Reception ==
=== Critical response ===
On the review aggregator website Rotten Tomatoes, 75% of 16 critics' reviews are positive, with an average rating of 6.4/10. The website's consensus reads: "Tracing the footsteps of The Terminal List, Dark Wolf manages to standout amongst the pack, leading a gritty and thrilling origin story that surpasses the original."
