= Itzik Cohen (actor) =

Israeli actor

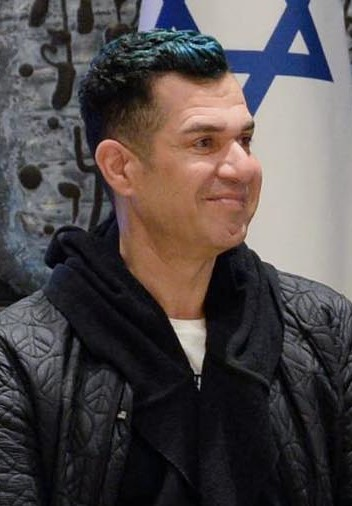
- Cohen in 2018
- Born: Itzhak Cohen; 9 September 1968 (age 58); Tel Aviv-Yafo, Israel
- Occupations: Actor, filmmaker, and television producer
- Years active: 1993–present
- Known for: Fauda television series
- Spouse: Michal Kirshenbaum (m. 1998; div. 2005)
- Children: 2

Itzhak "Itzik" Cohen (Hebrew: יִצְחָק ״אִיצִיק״ כֹּהֵן; born 9 September 1968) is an Israeli actor, filmmaker, and television producer. He is best known for portraying Captain Gabi Ayub in the political thriller television series Fauda.

After serving in the Israel Defense Forces, he received his BA with honors in 1993 from the Department of Theater at Tel Aviv University. In 1996, together with a few of his classmates, he founded the drag band Bnot Pesia (Note: "Bnot Pesia" may be interpreted either as "The Daughters of Pesia" or "Pesia Girls") The band helped bring drag into the Israeli mainstream, making appearances in the Uri Pasteur-directed musical All is Legend (alongside Michal Yannai), and the educational television program Return of the Sheriff.

== Acting career ==
=== Theater ===
From 1993-1994, as a member of the Atim Ensemble, Cohen played the priest in Romeo and Juliet, adapted and directed by Rina Yerushalmi. He worked with Yerushalmi again in 1995, on her play, Va-Yomer, Va-Yelech (Bible Project, Part I).

Cohen moved to the Cameri Theater in 2001, where he played both the titular Rabbi Kamea and Grandmother Sa’ida in Rabbi Kamea, the Israeli adaptation of Tartuffe by Moliere. In 2004, he gave, according to Haaretz, "the performance of a lifetime" as Ezra Sapir in Rami Danon and Amnon Levy's Father's Braid. Cohen switched to musicals in 2006, when he played Roger De Bris in The Producers. In 2008, he performed in two plays by celebrated Israeli director Moshe Captain: as Lazer Wolf in the musical Fiddler on the Roof, and as Sallah Shabati in the theatrical remake of Sallah Shabati. In 2010, he starred as Pantelon in the Israeli adaptation of Carlo Goldoni's The Servant of Two Masters, directed by Moni Moshonov. In 2012, he played Moshiko Babayof, the narrator in the musical Kazablan.

Cohen continued working in musicals in 2017, and made a return to drag, when he starred as Edna Turnblad in the Israeli adaptation of Hairspray. That same year, he starred in Ayad Akhtar’s play The Who & The What at the Haifa Theatre, as Afzal, a father desperately struggling to ensure his daughter marries within the faith. For his performance, he was nominated for Actor in a Leading Role at the Israeli Theater Prize Awards.

=== Film and television ===
In 2002, Cohen created, along with Jonathan Cognac, the Israeli television series Johnny for Channel 2. He appeared in the series as well, playing the titular Johnny's Iraqi mother.

In 2004, he starred in the teen drama Big Head as Elhanan, the school principal. After its cancellation in 2009, the show was brought back for a special sixth season in 2017, and Cohen returned to revive his role.

In 2009, Cohen starred in the film A Matter of Size as Herzl, an overweight man who decides to join a sumo wrestling team. For his performance, he won the Visitor's Booth in Israel award for Best Actor, and was nominated for the Ophir Award for Actor in a Leading Role. The following year, he finished in third place on the fifth season of the Israeli version of Dancing with the Stars.

Cohen had his international breakout role in 2015, on the political thriller television series Fauda. He plays Captain Gabi Ayub, the top interrogator in Israel's Shin Bet unit. The show has received international critical acclaim, with The New York Times voting it the best international show of 2017.

In 2021, he started working on the TV show The Beauty Queen of Jerusalem.

In 2025, Cohen was cast in Frequency of Fear alongside Daniella Pick, Doron Ben-David and Ángel Bonanni. The film is based on a covert Israeli operation in 2024 in Lebanon, using thousands of pagers and walkie-talkies to assassinate Hezbollah operatives.

== Personal life ==
Cohen was born in Tel Aviv-Yafo, Israel, to a Jewish family.

He served in the Israel Defense Forces as a soldier.

In 1998 Cohen married Michal Kirschenbaum, and they have a daughter. Cohen came out as gay in 2002, and the couple divorced in 2005, but in 2012 they had a son, Raphael, together. In 2013 he had bariatric surgery and lost 50 kg of his weight.

== Filmography ==
=== Film ===
Year	Title	Role	Notes
2001	Minutes of Glory	Dedi	
2003	Sima Vaknin, a Witch	Avi Vanunu	
2006	Charlotte's Web	Ike the Horse	Hebrew dub
2009	A Matter of Size	Herzl	Nominated for Ophir Award: Actor in a Leading Role
2010	The Guest	The Guest	
2016	The Women's Balcony	Aaron	
2017	Maktub	Elkaslasi	
2017	The Son of Bigfoot	Wallace Bear	Hebrew dub
2026	Frequency of Fear		

=== Television ===
Year	Title	Role	Notes
1997	Shuli's Boy	Niso	TV film
2002	Johnny	Doris	Creator
2004-2007; 2017	Big Head	Elhanan Berdugo	
2010	Dancing with the Stars	Himself	3rd place; Israeli version
2012	New York	Toka Abharmi	
2015-2016	Galis	Spector	
2015–present	Fauda	Captain Gabi Ayub	
2020	The Masked Singer (Israel)	Dragon	4th Place
2021	Oslo	Yossi Beilin	TV film
2021-2022	The Beauty Queen of Jerusalem	Avraham	
