= Irit Kaplan =

Israeli actress (born 1973)

- עירית קפלן
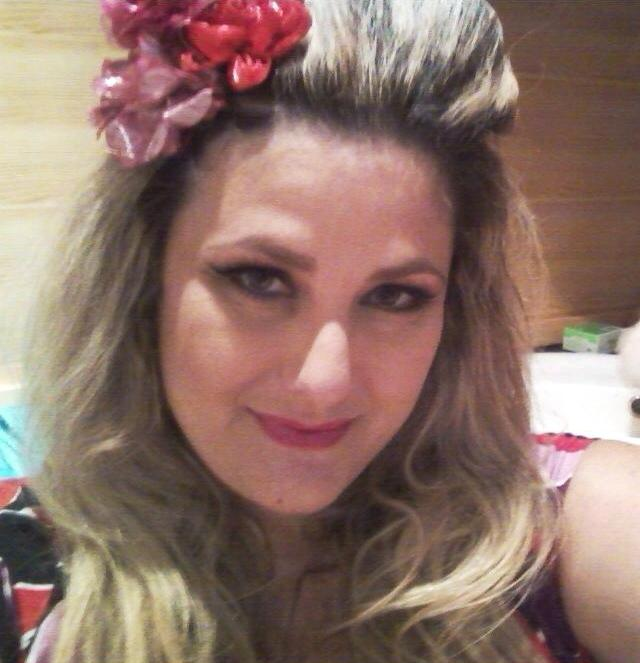
- Born: 27 July 1973 (age 52); Bat Yam, Israel
- Occupation: Actress
- Years active: 1998–present
- Children: 2

Irit Kaplan (Hebrew: עירית קפלן; born 27 July 1973) is an Israeli film and stage actress.

In 1998 she graduated (with honors) from the Beit Zvi School of Performing Arts.

== Awards ==
- 2006: Chamber Theater's Outstanding Actress Award for her role in Shemana
- 2009: Ophir Award: Best Actress in A Matter of Size
- 2022: Israeli Television Academy Award for 2021: Best Supporting Actress in the TV drama series The Beauty Queen of Jerusalem
