= Laëtitia Eïdo =

French actress (born 1985)

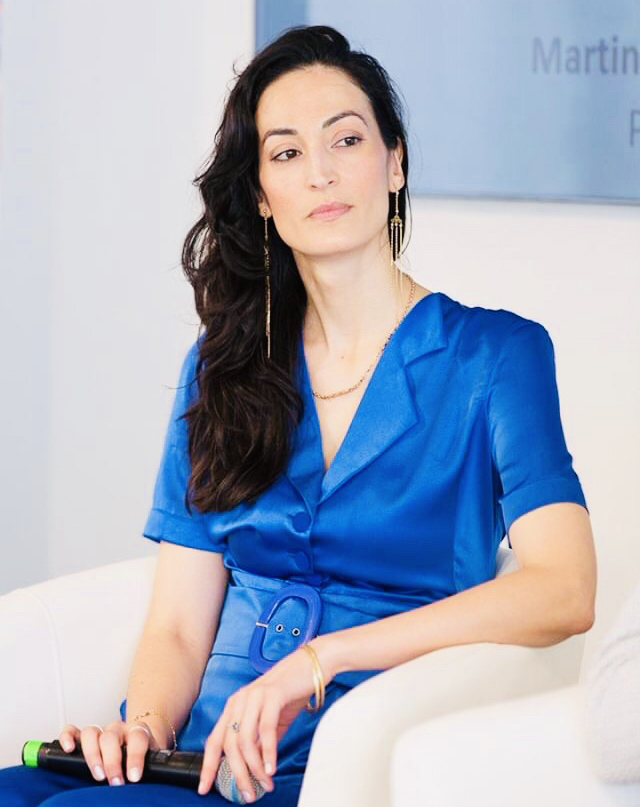
- Laëtitia Eïdo in 2019
- Born: 25 October 1985 (age 40); France
- Education: Cours Florent
- Occupations: Actress, film director
- Years active: 2008–present
- Known for: Fauda television series
- Website: laetitiaeido.com

Laëtitia Eïdo (born October 25, 1985) is a French actress. Born to a French father and a Lebanese mother, she is best known as Dr. Shirin El Abed, one of the leading roles in the Israeli Netflix series Fauda, and as the voice of Mira in the Adult Swim adult animated television series Primal.

She is also known for her roles in the American HBO Cinemax Strike Back series, A Borrowed Identity by Eran Riklis and the Israeli production Tel Aviv on Fire. Laëtitia was awarded the Best Actress Award at Montreal's Festival Vues du Monde' at Fespaco and at the Agadir Festival for her title role of the historical character Fatma N'Soumer in the French-Algerian feature film Fadhma N'Soumer.

Her multicultural background has led to her being cast as various nationalities and playing roles in several languages. Eido has worked on both French, American, and other international productions.

== Biography ==
Laëtitia Eïdo was born to a French father and a Lebanese mother.

== Acting career ==
Eïdo has played the roles of strong women both on the big and small screens.

She first trained in classical acting techniques in Paris, she attended workshops with theatre companies such as Peter Brook's or Jacques Lecoq's. She then studied in depth S. Meisner acting techniques in Paris and New York. She thus first started her acting career in the theatre where she interpreted known classical roles such as Andromache, in Racine's Greek tragedy, Eglé, Marivaux's character in the Quarrel.

In 2017 she took part in the new adaptation of the book the 4th wall of Sorj Chalandon staged by Arnaud Stéphan, at the National Theatre of Bretagne in Rennes. She then directed her career towards cinema and television. She plays many roles such as Cleopatra in The Destiny of Rome for the channel ARTE, Eshana for the series called Hero Corp directed by Simon Astier, the role of Jade in a French series called Yes I Do, produced by Studio+, as well as the leading feminine role in the film Holy Air directed by Shady Srour. She also starred in the film Tel Aviv on Fire directed by Sameh Zoabi.

In 2014, she took on the role of Fatma n'Soumer, a drama film shot in the Algerian Berber mountains in the Kabyle language, taking on the traits of a resistant woman who repels the first French invasion in 1850. That same year she played Fahima in the drama Dancing Arabs, directed by Eran Riklis.

In 2015, she landed her breakthrough role as Dr. Shirin El Abed in the international television series Fauda. That same year, she was a ‘Talent’ Alumna at the Berlin Film Festival (2015) and a jury member in festivals like Jerusalem, Oran or Cannes for the ‘Queer Palm’ award.

== Awards and nominations ==
- In 2016, Best Actress - Views of the World Film Festival of Montreal (Fadhma n'Soumer)
- In 2016, Best Actress - Sotigui Awards - Fespaco Festival (Fadhma n'Soumer)
- In 2017, nominated Best Actress - Tribeca Film Festival of New York (Holy Air)
- In 2017, nominated Best Actress - International Film Festival of Jerusalem (Holy Air)

== Filmography ==
Year	Title	Role	Notes
2008	E Mille	Lila	(short)
2008	Doom-Doom	Copine boite 1	(TV Series)
2008	Paname Follie's	L'espagnole	
2009	La marche des crabes	Sarah	(short)
2010	Hero Corp	Eshana	
2011	The Destiny of Rome	Cleopatra	(TV Series)
2011	L'Histoire d'une mère	La mère	
2011	Suerte		
2012	Mollement, un samedi matin	Myassa	
2012	Strike Back	Markunda	(TV Series)
2012	Article 23	Nès, la maîtresse du Président de la Banque	
2014	Dancing Arabs	Fahima	
2014	Fadhma N'Soumer	Fatma N'Soumer	
2015	Land of Nothing	Aria	
2015	Ella	Ella	(short)
2016	The12Project	Born	
2017	YES I DO		(TV Series)
2017	Holy Air	Lamia	
2017	Tel Aviv on Fire	Maisa	
2015-2017	Fauda	Dr. Shirin El Abed	(TV Series)
2018	Vole comme un papillon		
2018	Orgasme et Violons	ELLE	(short)
2018	Allepo	Hanan	(short)
2019	Long Time No See	Marion	
2020–present	Primal	Mira (voice)	Recurring role
2021	The Accusation	Yasmina Vasseur	
2021	The Man in the Basement	Carole Vasquez	
2023	Citadel	Christoph (voice)	Ep. 6
2023	Liaison (TV series)	Sabine Louseau	Recurring role
2024	Dirty Angels	Awina	
2024	Chief of Station	Farrah	
2024	Elyas	Amina	
