= Doron Ben-David =

Israeli actor

- דורון בן-דוד
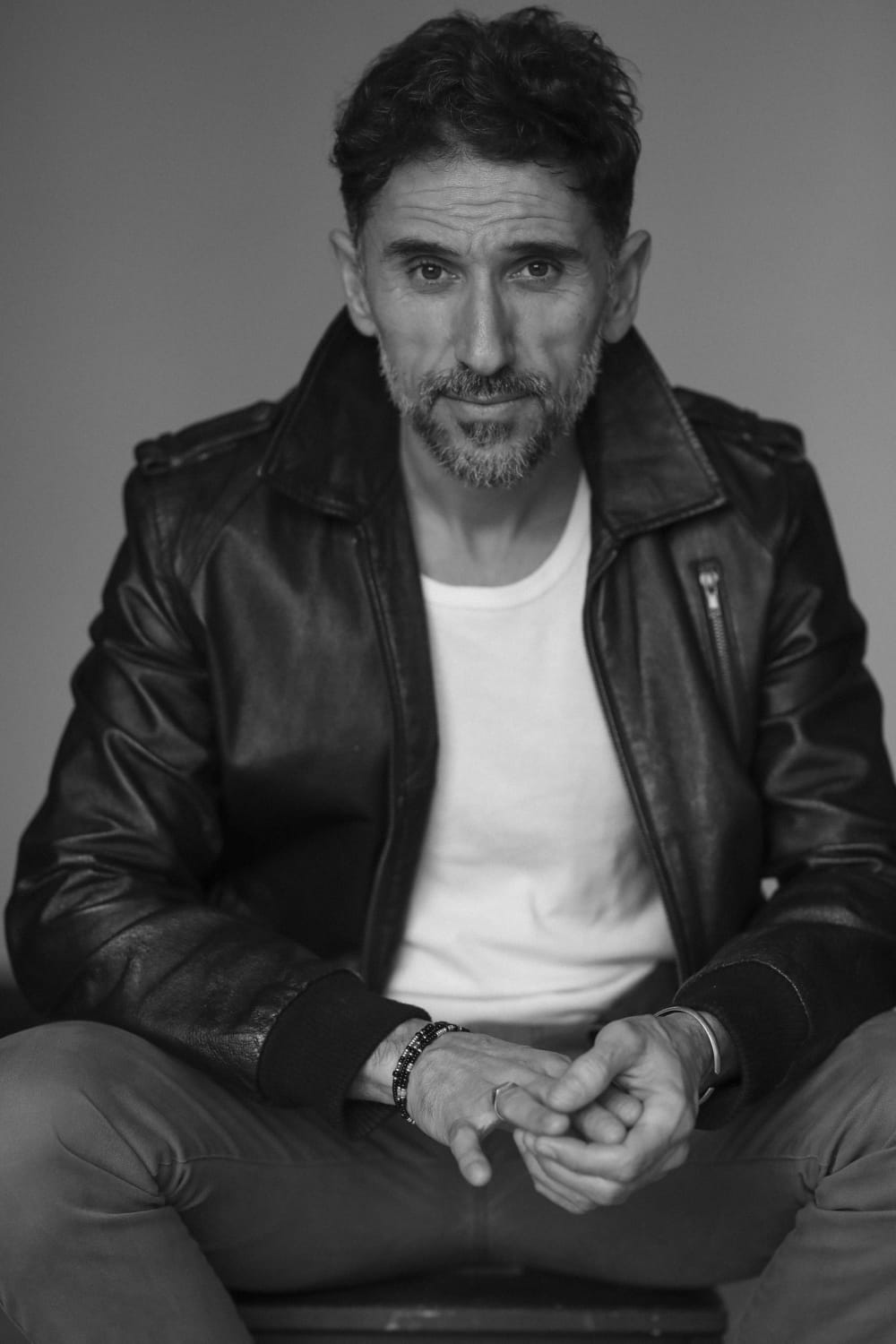
- Born: September 30, 1980 (age 46); Tel Aviv, Israel
- Occupation: Actor

Doron Ben-David (Hebrew: דורון בן-דוד; born 30 September 1980) is an Israeli actor. He is best known for playing Steve in the Israeli television series, Fauda.

== Early life ==
Ben-David was born in Tel Aviv and was mostly raised by his mother in the Ramat Hanasi neighborhood in Bat Yam. He was six-years-old when it was revealed that his father was leading a double life and had another family. Ben-David has six half-siblings from his father's relationship with another woman.

He studied at Ort Melton High School in Bat Yam. As a conscript in the Israel Defense Forces, he was stationed at the Erez Crossing as an inspector. He had to leave the army early after one year to work and support his family.

He later studied acting at the Beit Zvi performing arts school in Ramat Gan.

== Career ==
Since 2015, Ben-David has been a series regular, alongside Lior Raz in the Israeli thriller television series, Fauda. In the series, he plays Steve, a Mista'arvim operative.

In 2016, he appeared in a stage production of Sami Michael's novel, A Trumpet in the Wadi at Haifa Theatre.

Since 2020, he has starred in three seasons of the Israeli television police procedural series, Manayek on Kan 11.

In 2022, Ben-David played the protagonist, Amir Halevi in the acclaimed Israeli drama series, The Lesson. The series was inspired by the much-publicized case of a civics teacher in Rishon LeZion in 2020.

In 2025, Ben-David was cast in Frequency of Fear alongside Daniella Pick, Itzik Cohen and Ángel Bonanni. The film is based on a covert Israeli operation in 2024 in Lebanon, using thousands of pagers and walkie-talkies to assassinate Hezbollah operatives.

In addition to acting, he teaches acting classes and models, appearing in fashion campaigns for Factory 54.

== Personal life ==
Ben-David is married to Mittal, a yoga instructor, with whom he has three children. He lives with his family in Holon. He has spoken openly about experiencing anxiety and starting therapy at the age of 40.

In the wake of the October 7 attacks, Ben-David has volunteered. He prepared food and with other actors put on improvised shows for Israelis evacuated from border communities.

== Filmography ==
Year	Title	Role	Notes
2008	Ha-E (The Island)	Hunter	1 episode
2010	Miral	Soldier on bus	Film
2012	Allenby St.	Samir	1 episode
2013	Bnei Aruba (Hostages)	Mualem/Arms dealer	2 episodes
2015	Long Distance		Short film
2015–present	Fauda	Steve	Series regular
2016	Ptzuim BaRosh (Scarred)	Dolev Tzipori	2 episodes
2016	Our Father	Romano	Film
2016-2019	Metumtemet	Eran	16 episodes
2017	A New Spirit	Shmuel	Film
2017	Noflot al HaRaglayim (Landing on Their Feet)	Yaniv	2 episodes
2018–2021	Srufim	Franko	
2018-2019	Asylum City	Itai	12 episodes
2019	Stop Feeling Like You're Not Enough	Doron Ben-David	Short film
2020–present	Manayek	Ofir Leibowitz	30 episodes
2021	Mekif Milano	Itai	7 episodes
2021–2022	Malkot (Queens)	Shimi	10 episodes
2022	The Lesson	Amir Halevi	Series regular
2022	Jerusalem	Amir	Series regular
2026	Frequency of Fear		Film
