= Zaguri Imperia =

- Also known as: Zaguri Empire
- Genre: Comedy drama
- Created by: Maor Zaguri
- Written by: Maor Zaguri; Uri Weissbrod
- Directed by: Rani Sa'ar; Maor Zaguri
- Starring: Oz Zehavi; Moshe Ivgy; Ninet Tayeb; Sara von Schwarze; Chen Amsalem
- Composer: Tom Cohen
- Country of origin: Israel
- Original languages: Hebrew; Arabic
- No. of seasons: 2
- No. of episodes: 51

Production
- Executive producer: Na'ama Azulai
- Producer: Moshik Faran
- Cinematography: Avi Kasman
- Editor: Efrat Dror
- Running time: 45 minutes
- Production company: Herzliya Studios

Original release
- Network: HOT3
- Release: April 8, 2014 – April 1, 2015

Zaguri Imperia (Hebrew: זגורי אימפריה, lit. Zaguri Empire) is an Israeli comedy-drama, television series created by Maor Zaguri and produced by HOT Telecommunication Systems. The first season was broadcast on the cable channel HOT3 between April 8 to June 4, 2014. The second opened on 3 February 2015 and ended on 1 April 2015. The series was both one of the most expensive and most successful to ever air on Israeli television.

== Plot ==
The series opens with a flashforward of Aviel Zaguri, his face spattered with blood, telling a police officer that he has killed his father. He mutters that none can escape the hand of prophecy, and that he is Oedipus.

Eight years previously, Aviel was sent from his home in Beersheba to a boarding school, where he strove to shed his traditional Moroccan-Jewish heritage, adopting the norms and culture of his middle-class, Eastern European-descended Ashkenazi peers and even dropping his surname in favour of the more all-Israeli sounding "Gur". He is now a promising career officer in the IDF's Artillery Corps, holding the rank of a captain. Aviel is torn away from his military environment when urgently called back home, which he has barely visited since his departure, to the deathbed of his Grandfather Pinto. Decades ago, the latter owned the South's most prosperous falafel stand; his adopted son Albert ("Beber") married his biological daughter Vivienne in spite of his severe opposition, and gradually drove Pinto out of business. Both severed all ties between them. Aviel is the only family member who reestablished contact with the old man, who made Aviel swear that someday he would reopen the stand and return it to its former glory, but he has forgotten his oath.

Aviel grudgingly brings with him his Ashkenazi girlfriend Shahar, a fellow officer, who is baffled by his stereotypical Algerian family, the members of which hold a dim view of the ethnic gap in Israel – Beber refuses to honor the moment of silence on Holocaust Remembrance Day, mockingly stating "I will stand when they teach about my 'shtetl' in Algeria!" – and instantly dub Shahar "mayonnaise" referring to her pale complexion. Aviel confronts the provincial, superstitious-religious, and poverty-stricken world he believed he left behind: his estranged, miserly, eccentric father and his entire family of nine residing in a cramped apartment. His mother, Vivienne, is a superstitious diabetic who has a complex relationship with her own mother, Alegria. Aviel's older brother, Avi, is a low-ranking police officer who still lives with his parents, while the younger twenty-something Eviatar dreams of a career in Oriental music and occasionally engages in petty crime for the local mafia boss, Ciao. 32-year-old eldest sister Miri is a desperate spinster; another younger brother, Avishay, suffers from supposed intellectual disability, though he is intelligent in his own way. The young teen Abir is foul-mouthed, violent, and troubled, and his slightly older sister Avigail is neurotic. Aviel is most burdened by his tension with his formerly close sister Avishag, who has grown to become an indulgent, capricious beauty. The household is dysfunctional, with everyone holding grudges; Beber adores and spoils Avishag, who neither works nor studies although she is already 25, to the resentment of her siblings. Vivienne has a similarly suffocating relationship with her long-lost Aviel and attempts to have him stay permanently. The newly returned Aviel also meets his old friend Lizzy, a young woman who adheres to a traditionalist, supernatural worldview that Aviel regards as absurd.

During Pinto's funeral, the Zaguris are visited by his elderly sister, Mas'uda. The old woman, who carries the reputation of being a witch, demands that Aviel – whom she and her brother call "The Circumcised", as he was born without a foreskin – uphold his vow. Upon perceiving his disinterest in doing so, she curses the family, compelling them all, and Aviel especially, to delve into their dark and troubled past while confronting their own bleak present.

== Cast ==
- Oz Zehavi as Aviel Zaguri (Gur)
- Ninet Tayeb as Elizabeth "Lizzy"
- Moshe Ivgy as Albert "Beber" Zaguri
- Sara von Schwarze as Vivienne "Vivi" Zaguri
- Chen Amsalem as Avishag Zaguri
- Israel Atias as Eviatar Zaguri
- Yafit Asulin as Miriam "Miri" Zaguri
- Kobi Maimon as Avi Zaguri
- Hila Harush as Avigail Zaguri
- Eyal Shikratzi as Abir Zaguri
- Daniel Sabag as Avishay Zaguri
- Hava Ortman as Grandmother Alegria
- Zohar Strauss as Dino
- Gal Macadar as Natalie
- Makram Khoury as Superintendent Hazan
- Yaara Pelzig as Shahar
- Ori Laizerouvich as Elbaz
- Hilly Lewis as Vicky
- Assaf Ben-Lulu as Dudu
- Loai Nofi as Muhammad "Hamud"
- Maor Zaguri as Ciao
- Judith Mergui as Michele
- Abraham Celektar as Grandfather Pinto
- Morris Cohen as the Rabbi
- Shlomi Tapiaro as "Alex X"
- Ronit Starshnov as Shimrit
- Alex Krul as Otto
- Dvora Kedar as Aunt Mas'uda
- Lior Narkis as himself
- Dror Keren as Kabbalist "Azriel son of Hadasa"

== Production ==
Series creator Maor Zaguri had a prolific career in theater, writing thirteen plays of which he directed eleven himself, before engaging in the field of television. He conceived the basic premise behind Zaguri Empire in late 2010, when he had to leave Tel Aviv and move back with his parents in Beersheva for a month. He recalled that he was completely sucked back into his home environment, and the experience shook him. He decided to "tell the story of someone who returns home" and is similarly transformed. The character of Aviel, who attempted to blend into the outside society and leave his old world behind, is somewhat based on the writer's own biography, and he deliberately named the fictional family in the series after his own. Combined with his personal story, he sought to address the larger subject of ethnic relations within Israeli society, which he believed should be tackled from a fresh, unbiased and unbitter angle by young Middle Eastern-descended (Mizrahim) artists. Zaguri was convinced that such an approach would effect a self-emancipation similar to that which African-American culture underwent in the United States.

When attempting to enter the television business, he approached HOT's drama chief Mirit Tovi with three different outlines; the one which was developed into Zaguri Empire was his least favourite, but she preferred it over the others. Their basic agreement was to produce a relatively cheap daily drama. However, when compiling the script, Zaguri constantly elaborated it, adding subplots and expensive outdoor scenes with many extras. He worked on the project for over a year, making the plot ever more complex and theatrical but not nearing completion, until the company coupled him with professional screenwriter Uri Weissbrod, who helped him finish. Weissbrod acceded to the high production standard set by Zaguri. They did not write it as a low-cost daily and insisted beforehand on the best actors in Israel, a decision that resulted in a necessary expenditure double of what was projected earlier. Although Zaguri recalled it was a gamble on someone who had no former experience with television, Tovi took it and accepted. While the budget remained undisclosed, sources within the company told the press it was the most expensive project undertaken by HOT since its establishment and claimed Zaguri Empire was Israel's highest-costing television production ever. It was approved when Israeli studios, influenced by the great success of Prisoners of War by Gideon Raff who was nearly anonymous before making his breakthrough, sought to encourage young and unknown artists. The creator fully immersed himself in the process, participating in all stages and eventually directing the second season of the two made.

Zaguri assembled the cast in what reviewer Na'amah Nagar perceived as a deliberate mocking of ethnic conventions. Some of the most stereotypical Moroccan characters were portrayed by European-descended actors. Vivienne was depicted by the Sara von Schwarze, her mother Alegria by Hava Ortman and the role of Mas'udah was played by Dvora Kedar-Halter, whose most recognized appearance on screen was that of the neurotic, Polish mother in Lemon Popsicle. He also granted himself the role of the mafia boss Ciao. Ninet Tayeb was originally cast as Avishag, but had to forgo due to previous commitments in the music industry, leaving the role to the young and anonymous Chen Amsalem, who entered acting school just three months before passing the audition. Tayeb eventually received the part of Lizzy. Principal photography commenced in February 2013, and both planned seasons, with some fifty episodes combined, were shot during the next nine months. The first was aired between April 8 and June 4, 2014, and the second would be broadcast from February 3, 2015. The first episode of the new one had a preliminary release on 29 January 2015.

== Series overview ==
Season	Episodes	Originally aired	
Season	Episodes	First aired	Last aired
1	26	April 8, 2014	June 4, 2014
2	25	February 3, 2015	April 1, 2015

== Reception ==
Zaguri Empire turned into an immediate success: within three weeks of the premiere, HOT reported it was the best series launch they ever had, with 3,000,000 video on demand rentals already, high ratings on their digital cable service and tens of thousands of followers in social media networks. By the season's end, it was Israel's most successful VOD title ever, surpassing 10,000,000 rentals, not including other media outlets. On 16 December 2014, with the publication of the annual Google Trends, Zaguri Empire topped the Israeli chart and was the country's most popular search string. On 13 February 2015, it won the Israeli Academy of Film and Television Prize for Best Daily Drama. Later that month, three weeks into the second season, it accumulated 17,000,000 million VOD rentals. By its conclusion in April, it became HOT's greatest hit ever, with 26,000,000 on-demand rentals, average prime-time ratings of 80%, and millions of illegal downloads).

Yedioth Ahronoth's television reviewer Ariana Melamed stated the series was "not racist, but diversified", and that its poignant depiction was not stereotypical, but cleverly exploiting these precepts to undermine conventional discourse. She regarded it as a masterful comedy. Makor Rishon's critic I'nabl Yaffe praised the series for closely emulating the outline of a Greek tragedy, referenced to with the mentioning of Oedipus, by contrasting predestination with free will. She noted other elements reflecting the Oedipal setting, including the sublime incestuous undertone of the parent-child relations in the plot. Yaffe also observed the traditional superstitious beliefs of the characters, perceived by other critics as a making them seem primitive, served also to accentuate the plot's magic realism. In a review of contemporary Mizrahi culture in Israel, Ya'el Freund-Avraham classified the series as a landmark which demonstrated the self-confidence in a new wave of creators dealing with the matter. She cited the rapid entry of slang from Zaguri Empire into popular use, mostly words in Judeo-Moroccan, as the most conclusive proof to its success with the audience. Li-Or Averbuch of Globes noted "it is overflowing with theatrical and cultural references, and is so punctilious that even the mistakes and defects seem calculated. Every detail, as subtle as it may be, will gain significance later on."

The series elicited a public debate on the ethnic tensions within Israeli society and the portrayal of Middle Eastern-descended people in the media. In a column for Haaretz, political scientist Dr. Dalia Gavrieli Nuri commended, above all, what she regarded as "superb writing" and "a brilliant use of language" for the dialogues. Nuri commented that the series transcended the regular ethnic debate as much as it did genre conventions: "Zaguri is as much about Moroccan-descended Jews in Israel as Lord of the Flies is about British children... It is also virtually impossible to categorize it: is it a Bourekas film? A Telenovela? Or maybe a moralizing tale?" Veteran Art critic Kobi Niv went as far as stating the programme was "a greater revolution than the '77 Upheaval in regards to the Israeli society's treatment" of the subject: "Zaguri Empire's makers reappropriated the condescending, ridiculing manner in which Mizrahim were portrayed by Ashkenazim and their collaborators among the former." Niv interpreted the incest theme implied in the plot, mainly that of Beber and Avishag, as a metaphor for the strongly patriarchal structure of most Mizrahi families, stating: "before they can end the Ashkenazi hegemony from without, they must shatter the patriarchal regime within." Dr. Hani Zubeida regarded the series as merely catering to the existing order. He argued that by having a creator of Middle Eastern descent present his ethnic group as backward and vulgar, in a manner consistent with their prevalent depiction in entertainment, the producers inoculated themselves from charges of racism. In the alternative-viewpoint magazine haO'ketz, edited by the Mizrahi Democratic Rainbow Coalition's leaders Yossi Dahan and Ishak Saporta, Dr. Iris Hefetz-Borchardt sharply condemned Zaguri as an instrument of Ashkenazi oppression, which presented its characters as inferior for commercial ends and also lacked in artistic merit.

In 2016, the series' TV format was sold to the Sony Corporation of America, that considered having David Shore direct an American version. Maor Zaguri was under heavy pressure to direct a third season, in spite of his own opposition to another one. He was eventually persuaded and even wrote five episodes. The series was shelved when lead actor Moshe Ivgy was accused of sexual harassment in March 2016.
