= Israel–Tajikistan relations =

- Israel: Tajikistan

Israel–Tajikistan relations refers to the current and historical relations between Israel and Tajikistan. Israel and Tajikistan have established relations on 26 March 1992.

Israel is represented in Tajikistan by the Israeli embassy in Tashkent, Uzbekistan.

== History ==
After the dissolution of the Soviet Union, Israel recognized Tajikistan in 1991, and on 26 March 1992 Israel and Tajikistan have established relations.

In October 1995, at the margins of the UN General Assembly, the President of the Republic of Tajikistan Emomali Rahmon met with the Prime Minister of Israel Yitzhak Rabin.

First visit of Israeli officials to Tajikistan was made in 2016 by the Israeli MPs Sharren Haskel and Yossi Yona.

== See also ==
- Foreign relations of Israel
- Foreign relations of Tajikistan
