= Farewell Baghdad (2013 film) =

- Promotional poster
- Arabic: مطير الحمام
- Directed by: Nissim Dayan
- Written by: Nissim Dayan
- Produced by: David Mandil, Dov Keren, Moshe Edri, Leon Ederi, Hezi Bezalel, Omri Bezalel
- Starring: Daniel Gad; Yigal Naor; Uri Gavriel; Ahuva Keren; Yasmin Ayun; Menashe Noy; Eli Dor Hayim; Ron Shahar; Mira Awad
- Cinematography: Shai Goldman
- Edited by: Asaf Korman
- Music by: Sharon Farber
- Release date: 13 May 2013 (Israeli Film Academy)
- Running time: 105 minutes
- Country: Israel
- Language: Baghdadi Judeo-Arabic

Farewell Baghdad (Hebrew: מפריח היונים, lit. The Dove Flyer; Arabic: مطير الحمام, romanized: Muṭayr al-Ḥammām) is an Israeli film based on the novel with the same name, by Iraqi-born Jewish writer Eli Amir. The film was directed by Nissim Dayan, who also wrote the screenplay. The idea for the film was conceived by actress Ahuva Keren, and the script was translated by her into Judeo-Arabic. The making of the film was completed in 2013, but the film itself was commercially released in April 2014.

Over nearly two hours, and through the story of a 16-year-old Jewish boy (Daniel Gad), Farewell Baghdad depicts the story of the last days of the Baghdad Jewish community of the 1950s, and on the eve of the Aliyah of almost all of that community to Israel in Operation Ezra and Nehemiah. At that time, The Kingdom of Iraq was struggling to overcome its defeat in the 1948 Arab–Israeli War against the State of Israel, and was torn between Royalism, separatism and communism. On the other hand, the world's oldest Jewish community, which numbered at the time about a sixth of the population of the capital of Baghdad, also grappled between their historical and cultural relationship with the Iraqi people, the growing support for the communist movement, and their solidarity with the State of Israel and Zionism.

Farewell Baghdad is the first Judeo-Arabic-language film in the history of cinema (specifically, Baghdadi Judeo-Arabic), and as traditionally is with the Jews of Iraq, it is inserted with phrases from the scriptures (such as "Bar Minan", "Tisha B'Av" etc.) in their traditional Iraqi Hebrew pronunciations. When the Jewish characters talk with Arab Muslims, the dialect changes slightly and becomes a Muslim Iraqi Arabic.

== The characters ==
=== Beit Imari ===
==== The Salman Imari Family ====
- Kaabi Imari (Daniel Gad) – The film's protagonist, a 16-year-old Jewish boy, a version of Eli Amir. A high school student, slightly driven by hormones but primarily a warm, supportive, and loving family member striving for independence and a role within the family. The film shows his first shave, emphasizing his desire to no longer be seen as a child.
- Salman Imari (Yigal Naor) – Kaabi's father, formerly a law student, later a lawyer, an oud player, and a bon vivant. Now a respected man, a father of two, and a top-tier tailor. He enjoys spoiling his family with Middle Eastern sweets. The story reveals that he numbs his hidden pain with arak and is more enigmatic than he first appears.
- Naima Imari (Ahava Keren) – Kaabi's mother, a homemaker.
- Nuri Imari – Kaabi's 13-year-old brother, a student who also works part-time in Salman's tailor shop alongside a seamstress named Dizi.

==== The Hezekel Imari Family ====
- Hezekel Imari (Eli Dor Haim) – Salman's younger brother and Kaabi's uncle. He was active, likely ideologically, in the Zionist underground movement in Iraq, known as "HaTnu'a."
- Rachel Imari (Yasmin Ayun) – Hezekel's wife, significantly younger than him. She is portrayed as a stunning young woman with blue eyes, fair skin, and long golden hair. However, her qualities go beyond her looks—she is independent and determined. She defies conventions, as seen when she slaps Salman after he comments on her modesty in dress. Kaabi secretly suffers from forbidden love for Rachel, and some scenes suggest she may have feelings for him as well.
- Rachel and Hezekel live in an apartment adjacent to Salman Imari's family. The doors of both apartments open into a shared courtyard, separated from the street by a gate.

=== The Abu Adwar Family ===
- Abu Adwar (Uri Gavriel) – A middle-aged, uneducated man whose first name and surname are not revealed in the film. He makes a living as a "pigeon handler," a profession not considered respectable in the community. The term "pigeon handling" refers to raising pigeons on his rooftop and selling them as a delicacy to the city's wealthy. Some pigeons are sold to be stuffed with rice, but even more exquisite are the pigeons stuffed and prepared by the handler himself. Even for Hezekel, Abu Adwar refuses to use his strong connections with the city's dignitaries, which he built through his work. He praises the good life enjoyed by Iraq's Jews and the seventy types of dates, cream, and fish that bless the land. He opposes Zionism, explaining that "Israel does not belong to us. Israel belongs to other Jews."
- Juliet – Abu Adwar's wife and the mother of his children. She has a minor presence in the film.
- Adwar (David Shaul) – The eldest son of Abu Adwar and Juliet, Kaabi's peer and friend. He is portrayed as a mischievous youth active in the Communist movement. The name "Adwar" is the Arabic pronunciation of "Edward."
- Amira (Inbal Nir) – The youngest daughter of Abu Adwar and Juliet, in love with Kaabi and active in the Zionist movement.

The Abu Adwar family lives on the top floor of the same building where the two nuclear families of the Amari household reside.

Kaabi, Nuri, Adwar, and Amira attend the same high school. Kaabi and Adwar are friends, and Salman and Abu Adwar go out together to drink and have fun.

=== Additional characters ===
==== Muslims ====
- Karim Abd al-Haq (Ron Shahar) – A Muslim lawyer and a close friend, almost like a brother, to Salman from their law school days. Karim supports both the Zionist movement and the Communists. He is the brother of a high-ranking officer and seems to have other connections with the authorities. A lover of alcohol and Jewish women, Naima Amari describes him as handsome "like a movie star" and "as wise as Hezekiel—perhaps even wiser".
- Abu Saadon (Hazi Tzadik) – A Muslim who makes his living running an establishment that is part café, part restaurant, and part nightclub. This place acts as a kind of mirror revealing the hidden sides of the male characters, especially Salman. It is here that Salman is seen drinking and where he explains to Kaabi that no one—not Abu Saadon, not Abu Adwar, nor anyone else—can be trusted.
- Colonel Hamid (Kobi Faraj) – A high-ranking Muslim officer in the Iraqi army, primarily engaged in carrying out violent raids, akin to pogroms, against the homes of Jews and Communists.

==== Jews ====
- Abu Tsalach (Menashe Noy) – A baker and a key figure in the Zionist underground movement. The community sees him as a disgrace due to his unclear past relationship with a Bedouin woman, Fathiya, who later appears in the film and shares his bed. The film does not elaborate on this, but from the book, we learn that Abu Tsalach is a somewhat hedonistic bachelor who also pursues Amira. His nickname, "Abu Tsalach," was not earned through fatherhood (as he has no children) but due to other aspects of his personality.
- Abu Tsalach's home also serves as a hideout for Fuad, an emissary from Israel who delivers instructions from the Israeli government and David Ben-Gurion.
- Salim – Salman's paternal cousin and an activist in the Communist movement. He believes that Jews will never be allowed to leave Iraq and therefore must align themselves with their Muslim and Christian brethren in the revolution to overthrow the monarchical and capitalist regime.
- Abu George (Yossi Alfi) and Umm George (also known as Gladys) – Wealthy Jews in Baghdad and clients of both Salman and Abu Adwar. The Jewish community despises them, accusing them of amassing wealth by exploiting other Jews. However, the Iraqi government considers them an important part of the national economy.
- Salima (Mira Awad) – A glamorous and desirable singer who performs at Abu Saadon's café. Salman was once in love with her and wanted to marry her, and Abu Adwar also confesses his attraction to her. The film does not specify her religion, but it is plausible that she is Jewish. She may be based on the real-life Jewish singer Salima Murad, who remained in Iraq, converted to Islam, and married Nazem al-Ghazali, one of Iraq's greatest singers at the time.

The film's trailer states that it tells the story of four women—likely Rachel, Amira, Naima, and Salima, each central to the romantic entanglements of Kaabi and Salman.

== Plot ==
=== The search for weapons in the Amari family homes ===
The film opens with Kabi sitting calmly at his desk. The silence of the early morning hours is interrupted by Colonel Hamid Abd al-Aziz (Kobi Farag) of the Iraqi police, accompanied by soldiers/officers Mohammed and Adnan (Tawfeek Barhom). The three pound on the inner courtyard gate facing the street. When Kabi opens the gate, they storm into the two apartments, dragging with them Hezekel, who is handcuffed and appears to have endured a brutal night of interrogation. The officers shackle Hezekel to the window bars and begin a violent search for hidden weapons.

Through the tense exchanges between the enforcers and the family members, the viewer is introduced to the Amari family. It also becomes clear that Hezekel was arrested for writing a newspaper article criticizing the Iraqi government. (From the book, it is revealed that the article warned Jews about what awaited them in Basra under Shafiq Adas, a wealthy Jewish merchant close to the royal family, who was accused of smuggling weapons to Israel and supporting the communist movement.)

During the search, Adnan finds an oud inside the wardrobe in Salman (Igal Naor) and Naima's bedroom. Unlike the other objects he tosses to the floor, the officer carefully and respectfully places the oud on the bed.

Ultimately, the search yields nothing. The Iraqi police leave, dragging Hezekel with them to an unknown location. During the search, Salman, who had apparently gone out for the evening, is not at home. He returns just as the police are leaving, only to be met with Naima's reproach about his timing.

=== The Visits to Hezekel ===
Kabi leads the family in their attempts to locate Hezekel, meet with him, and perhaps even secure his release. Initially, they make an unsuccessful attempt to enlist the services of Zilka, a Jewish lawyer who studied law alongside Salman. Later, Salman sends Kabi to seek advice from Abu Tsalach.

Abu Tsalach directs Kabi to Karim. It soon becomes clear that Karim desires Rashel and hopes to earn her favor in exchange for his efforts to help Hezekel.

In the early morning, Salman takes Kabi to the hidden weapons stash in their home. Kabi bundles the few firearms into a sack and, before heading to school, carries it through the streets of Baghdad to Abu Tsalach.

Karim instructs Kabi on how to disguise himself and act as a simple tea server. Kabi dons a robe, takes a tray of tea, and, in this disguise, visits Hezekel several times in the basements of the Iraqi CID (Criminal Investigation Division). Hezekel, wasting away, asks Kabi to hide the severity of his condition and deliver a message to the community—especially to Abu Tsalach—that it is time to move to the "next stage," meaning to leave Iraq and immigrate to Israel.

While in prison, Kabi encounters a man known as "the Armenian," the leader of the communist resistance, who defiantly sings "The Internationale" (in Arabic) in defiance of the guards.

=== The Truck to Iran ===
Kabi and Edouard go out together for an evening. They visit a brothel, where the shocked Kabi witnesses a disturbing scene: a virgin being auctioned off to the highest bidder, followed by the display of a bloodstained sheet from a window above. Kabi seemingly does not partake in the services offered and instead listens to Edouard's erotic descriptions. After leaving, they head to Abu Saadoun's café, where, to the sound of Salima singing the songs of the Kuwaiti brothers Salah and Daoud, they meet Abu Edouard, Karim, and Salman.

Amira flirts with Kabi, teasing him about his attraction to Rashel. Meanwhile, Abu Edouard and Salman discuss, half-seriously and half-jokingly, the possibility of a marriage between Kabi and Rashel and Kabi's potential involvement in the pigeon business.

Following the execution of "the Armenian," the communist leader, everyone realizes that the Iraqi government will now turn its attention to the Jewish community and the Zionist underground. The school principal, Ustaz Nawi (a cameo appearance of author Eli Amir), sends Kabi and Edouard to warn Salim. Kabi gathers money from his father to help Salim secure a place on a truck arranged by the underground movement, smuggling Jews to Iran on their way to Israel.

Amira also plans to board the truck. Before leaving, she confesses her love for Kabi, and they share a kiss in the market. This kiss sparks a confrontation between Kabi and Edouard, but Kabi makes it clear that he will not let Edouard interfere in his relationship with Amira. She boards the truck, but not before promising Kabi that she will wait for him, assuring him that since "Israel is small," he will have no trouble finding her. Salman is pleased with Kabi's involvement in the Zionist movement.

After Amira's escape, a furious Abu Edouard confronts Abu Tsalach, accusing him of dishonoring Amira and then helping her flee to Israel. In his rage, Abu Edouard threatens to either kill Abu Tsalach and then himself or turn him over to the authorities. The tension is finally diffused when Salman intervenes. Fatḥiya, the Bedouin woman, pours a bucket of cold water over Abu Edouard's head, shocking him back to his senses.

=== The Citizenship Renunciation Law ===
Karim warns Kavi, who has already become a full member of the movement, about the Iraqi secret police. He also recommends that he join Abu Edward's pigeon business to remove suspicion from himself. Abu Edward is happy to bring Kavi into the business, as Edward's communist activity has intensified to the point that he has left his parents' home.

Kavi and Abu Edward are invited to prepare and serve their stuffed pigeons at an intimate dinner hosted by Abu and Umm George in honor of Iraq's Prime Minister Nuri al-Said (Makram Khoury) and his secretary, Dr. Rashid. The pigeon handlers eavesdrop on the conversation and discover that after al-Said executed the communist leaders, he turned his attention to the Jewish issue. He invited himself to his Jewish friends' home only to inform them of his decision to allow Jews to leave if they renounce their citizenship. Al-Said clarifies that the government will not be able to protect those who remain and that he expects the masses to throw the bodies of the remaining Jews to the dogs. At the same time, he promises Abu George and his family that he will personally protect them and asks them to stay.

Kavi quickly reveals the contents of the conversation, first to Abu Salah and then to the Ammari household. Abu Salah addresses the Jews in the synagogue, urging them to immigrate to Israel, but he faces strong opposition from Abu Edward. A similar division arises in the Ammari family: Naima opposes leaving due to historical and cultural ties to Iraq, while Rashel makes it clear that she does not intend to immigrate, as she plans to wait for Hezekiah in Iraq.

Kavi visits Hezekiah one last time, accompanied by Salman. Hezekiah makes Salman swear to their parents and the rest of the family that he will not allow Rashel to wait for him in Iraq.

The Iraqi police suspect Kavi due to his active involvement in the Jewish community. He is arrested and violently interrogated by Colonel Hamid, who mockingly presents him with a patriotic Iraqi essay he wrote the previous school year. After the brutal interrogation, Kavi is thrown into a cell with Menashe, another Jew he knows. Menashe, whose fingernails have been torn out during torture by the Iraqi police, succumbs to his wounds while Kavi calls the guard in vain.

Karim's intervention manages to secure Kavi's release, but Karim makes it clear that this is the last time he can help the family.

=== Last Days in Baghdad ===
Kabi's arrest likely leads Naima to the sad realization that there is no future for Jews in Iraq. Salman begins selling suitcases in his store, and it seems that the departure is imminent.

Rashal turns to Karim, asking him to work for the release of Hezkel. She tries to seduce him to convince him, but when Kabi enters the room and firmly orders Rashal to return home, the interaction between them ends. On their way home, Kabi holds Rashal by the cheek, tells her that she has become tiresome to him, and kisses her on the lips. In response, she gently strokes his face and says, "Oh Kabi... my poor one."

It is revealed that the supreme leader of the "movement" is actually Salman, who orders the collection and destruction of all weapons, intending to reduce risks and maintain calm ahead of the Aliyah. Salman also orders the collection of lists of immigrants. After Kabi and most of the attendees leave the meeting, Salman informs Abu Salih that he has received new orders from the homeland. The plot shifts immediately to describe the panic of the Jews as they save Torah scrolls after an explosion at the synagogue. Naima and Rashal arrive at the scene and see Salman emerging, his face blackened and his tie disheveled, from the synagogue. Naima vents her anger at Salman, calling him a snake.

Salman bids farewell to Salima the singer, sells his store, and the family prepares for Aliyah. Salman holds a farewell party at his home for his Jewish and Muslim friends, during which he plays the oud for the last time. Rashal, who does not join the celebration, tells Kabi that after Salman finished his career as a lawyer, he became an oud player and wanted to tie his fate to Salima's.

Colonel Abd al-Hamid finds hidden weapons in Abu Salih's house/bakery and arrests him. Kabi and Edwar conclude that the pigeon breeder, none other than Abu Edwar, was the one who informed the authorities about Abu Salih. In their anger, they release all the pigeons that Abu Edwar had raised.

Hezkel and Abu Salih are led to the gallows, with a large white paper pinned to the front of their shirts, reading "I am a Zionist traitor" in Arabic. They are publicly hanged, in front of Rashal and Fathiyeh, who collapse. In the dead of night, the Jews arrive at the gallows and remove the two corpses. Salman's voice, choked with tears as he recites the Kaddish for his brother, is heard in the background.

The Jews renounce their citizenship and wait for flights that will take them to Israel. When the time comes, they leave their homes, which are taken over by Palestinian refugees who fled Israel during the War of Independence. The refugees call out to the Jews leaving, saying they will settle in their homes in Palestine.

In the final image of the film, Kabi, his younger brother, father, and mother are standing in line to board the plane that will take them to Israel. Salman carries the oud with him, but one of the soldiers confiscates it from him. Rashal remains behind, with Karim standing behind her.

== Production ==
Ahuva Keren, who plays the role of Naima, was the one who conceived the idea of filming the movie in Iraqi Arabic. She also translated the script into the language and was responsible for training the actors who were not fluent in Arabic.

According to the filmmakers, the production took eight years (likely referring to the period from when Ahuva Keren first proposed making a film in Baghdadi Judeo-Arabic until the completion of the production). In June 2012, Moshe Edery stated that Sasson Gabay was set to star in the film.

The filming lasted for thirty consecutive days in the summer of 2012, across various locations in Israel, including Jaffa, the Old City of Jerusalem, Acre, and Nazareth. Extensive editing and sound corrections followed the shoot.

Dudu Tassa, the grandson of Daud al-Kuwaiti, worked on the music for the film's scenes featuring songs by the al-Kuwaiti brothers, Daud and Saleh. The final touches on the soundtrack were done by composer Sharon Farber.

Although the film's production was completed in 2013, it was released in theaters only on 10 April 2014, around Passover, possibly to draw a parallel between the exodus of Iraqi Jews from Baghdad and the biblical Exodus from Egypt. In mid-May 2014, the film began a series of premiere screenings in London, attended by author Eli Amir.

== Budget and production funding ==
According to Nisim Dayan, enormous sums were required to recreate the historical period. In addition to a grant of 157,000 shekels from Mifal HaPais, significant funding was raised from the Rabinovich Foundation. When the funds ran out, brothers Moshe and Leon Edery were brought in to support the production. The project also received backing from the Israel Land Development Company, particularly from its leaders, Yaakov Nimrodi and Ofer Nimrodi. Dayan mentioned that wealthy Iraqi Jews living in London, who wished to remain anonymous, also invested in the film.

The film's official poster lists the following supporters in this order: the Rabinovich Foundation in collaboration with the Recanati Foundation, the Ministry of Culture and Sports, Eddie Feit, Yaakov and Ofer Nimrodi, Uri David, Mifal HaPais, and the Israeli Film Encouragement Fund. It is likely that "Eddie Feit" and "Uri David" were among the anonymous London donors.

According to IMDb estimates and reports from Israel's Channel 2 News, the production budget was approximately 9 million shekels. However, according to the NRG website, the budget was 9 million shekels.

== Review and audience response ==
=== Ticket sales ===
Dayan said that "within about a week, Farewell Baghdad drew 30,000 viewers". Actor Daniel Gad proudly posted on his Facebook page a screenshot from the Cinema City network website showing the film at the top of the network's most-watched list.

A similar picture was presented by critic Yair Raveh, who reported that "after two weeks in theaters, it had reached 60,000 tickets—more than any other Israeli film in 2014—and demand kept growing". He also noted that as of 4 May 2014, the film stood at 80,000 tickets and predicted it would reach 100,000 ticket sales, despite what he considered to be standard distribution with few screenings and modest publicity. In a publication dated 20 May 2014, the website of the Israeli Ministry of Foreign Affairs confirmed that this forecast came true.

=== Awards and film festivals ===
The film won the Ophir Award in 2013 for Best Costume Design and Best Art Direction. It was also the opening film of the Epos Film Festival in 2013.

Nissim Dayan complained that the Israeli Film Academy "totally and completely passed over his film…” and that "no festival in the world wanted the film". He explained that this was due to political reasons: “… because it is Zionist. We were told this implicitly, and sometimes even explicitly, that this is the reason. If the film dealt with Palestinian issues, its fate would have been different. You see that films dealing with the occupation are screened at all the festivals". He related this to the fact that the film presents Jews as victims: "This is not conspiratorial but rather a precise pattern. The moment Jews are the victims of the conflict and not the Arabs, it takes on a completely different character… Jews who crossed the border from Iraq, from Syria, from Egypt to Israel, and even those who came from Morocco by sea, were seen as people who crossed into a land that was actually theirs—Mesopotamia, the Middle East. They are not colonialists. And that is something the Palestinians are not willing to accept. They want the conflict to be clearly white vs. black, and that’s not accurate here".

=== Film critics ===
Film critics were united in their appreciation of the film and the unimaginable effort to reconstruct a historical period and language. They were also united in a sense of missed opportunity, feeling that the cinematic product failed to fully reap the rewards of that effort.

The film raised interest in Iraq, with a leading Iraqi filmmaker even secretly reaching out to Israeli distributors in hopes of screening it in Baghdad, despite the risks involved.

For example, critic Shmulik Duvdevani from Ynet wrote: "Perhaps Farewell Baghdad would have benefited from being adapted into a television series, which would have allowed for deeper development of the characters (especially that of the protagonist, Kabi, whose personality evolves both psychologically and politically), and of the historical context of the story. Still, there is something in Dayan’s film that reflects his great love for Amir’s text, and that love, as well as the respect for the vanishing culture it portrays, comes through well in the film".

Uri Klein, the veteran film critic for Haaretz, also offered mostly positive feedback, though he titled his review with a sense of disappointment: "Farewell Baghdad: an impressive yet disappointing attempt to tell the story of Iraqi Jewry."

Independent critic Yair Raveh likewise did not spare criticism for the script and editing: "I left the film quite frustrated. I barely understood a thing. I don’t think any scene led naturally into the next. The chronology of the story seemed jumbled. Events that already occurred in the film were discussed in the next scene as if they hadn’t happened yet". On the other hand, he also found the film worthy of revisiting: "Honestly, I’d be happy to watch a television series about all this rather than a film. I’d like to understand every character and every element, and break down the conflict and this world into its smallest parts. It seems to me that in a TV series, Nissim Dayan would also be in his most natural element—telling a story with a long breath, in fine detail".

Based on four different reviews, the Israeli film site Edb (Entertainment Database) gave the film a critics' score of 6.8.

=== Public response ===
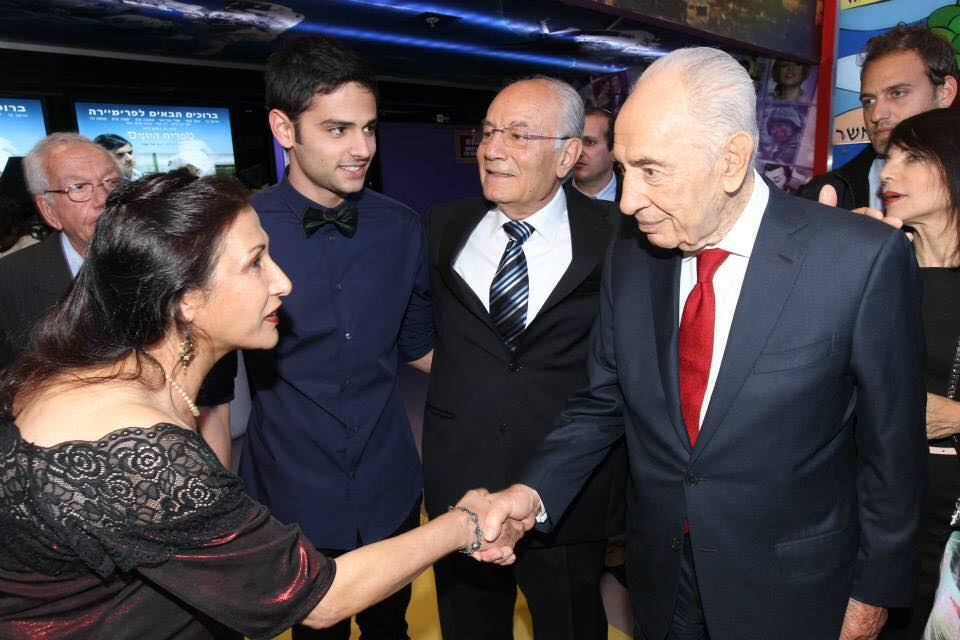
Photo from the film's premiere screening attended by President Shimon Peres.

Unlike the critics, Dalia Itzik, a descendant of an Iraqi immigrant family, wrote on her Facebook page: "The film brought me back many times to the scents and stories I grew up with in my parents' home. 'Farewell Baghdad' gives a dimension and introduces a world that is unfamiliar to many Israelis. It is the story of the immigration of Jews from Iraqi, as well as the story of many other immigrations from other countries who arrived in Israel during those years. I highly recommend the film, as it tells the story of our country and serves as an example of Israeli cinema that evokes pride.". This was after attending the film's premiere at the Cinematheque.

President Shimon Peres, who attended the same screening, wrote: "A high-quality and genuine film that touches the heart of every one of us and serves as an example of outstanding Israeli cinema".

Isaac (Bougie) Herzog also found it important to recommend the film on his Facebook page: “'Farewell Baghdad,' Eli Amir’s wonderful book, has become a heartwarming film by Nissim Dayan. It sheds light on the immigration of Iraqi Jews and the end of the oldest Jewish community in the world, in a delicate and moving human story that, unfortunately, hasn’t been told enough in our history classes. The language of the film is richly flavored Iraqi Arabic, and the actors' effort is impressive. Michal and I enjoyed watching the film and highly recommend it".

The film received a score of 10.0 in user reviews (from 52 users) on the IDB website.

Din Leichter from the Frogi website may express the disappointment of Arabic-speaking viewers when he remarked: “…the actors' Arabic is really not good – what can you do, when you cast actors with no Arabic background (Ron Shahar, for example) and ask them to play characters who speak only Arabic, it harms the quality of the film…”.

== Differences compared to the book ==
Naturally, many details presented in the book were omitted in the transition to the cinematic medium. Nevertheless, the film attempts to represent the details and information found in the book. A viewer who has not read the book may at times find it difficult to understand these hints.

The director and screenwriter, Nissim Dayan, stated: “I asked for and received complete artistic freedom from him [the author Eli Amir]. He really loved the final product. ... In fact, the film is very different from the novel. For example, in the novel, Kabi is a passive character. He merely absorbs, observes, and doesn’t even get arrested. In our version, he becomes an active character, a protagonist, not an outside observer. The film begins with him and ends with him, in a very clear, completely subjective narrative of a hero through whom I tell the story. He is essentially Amir’s alter ego. In the first shot, you see him leaning over his writing, indicating that we are about to watch what he will later write. I amplified the romantic conflict around Rashel and invented the scene with Saida — it doesn’t exist in the novel. There is also no synagogue in the novel. And yet, Eli Amir was moved to tears by the final result.”

Author Eli Amir clarifies that these changes were to his satisfaction: “A film needs to provide answers. In the book, I ask questions, and the film provides the answers. You can't leave things open in a film, and I am pleased with the answers it gives״.

The creators of the film chose not to include the parts of the book that take place in Israel. Other major differences include:
