= Mishpacha =

Orthodox Jewish magazine

- Mishpacha Issue 1000, cover dated February 21, 2024
- Editor in Chief: Moshe Grylak
- Managing Editor: Shoshana Friedman
- Categories: News magazine
- Frequency: Weekly
- Circulation: Almost 45,000 copies as of July 2006
- Publisher: The Mishpacha Group
- Founder: Eliyahu Paley
- Founded: 1984
- Based in: Jerusalem, Israel
- Language: English, Hebrew
- Website: http://www.mishpacha.com/
- OCLC: 57819059

Mishpacha (Hebrew: מִשְׁפָּחָה, lit. 'family') - Jewish Family Weekly is a Haredi weekly magazine package produced by The Mishpacha Group in both English and Hebrew.

== History ==
Mishpacha is one of the four major English-language newspapers and magazines serving the Haredi Jewish community in the United States. Together, the four publications had a circulation of about 100,000 as of 2015. Mishpacha is the only one based in Jerusalem.

The Mishpacha Publishing Group was founded in 1984 with the publication of the Hebrew Mishpacha magazine. Publisher and CEO Eli Paley teamed with Moshe Grylak towards the goal of producing a magazine that would serve as a conduit for the exchange of ideas and values between the varying streams within Jewish orthodoxy, among them the Hasidic, Yeshivish, Sephardic, and Modern Orthodox communities. With no other weekly or monthly magazines geared towards Orthodox Jewish readership at that time, Mishpacha quickly gained popularity, in effect launching the Jewish Orthodox magazine industry.

The first editor for the Hebrew edition was Asher Zuckerman (now the editor of the Hebrew newspaper Sha'ah Tova). Established as a monthly magazine, it became a weekly magazine at the beginning of 1991. After a while the newspaper split into two competing weekly papers. One is left with the original name "Mishpacha" and the other is called "Hashavua" (This Week).

In November 2010 by the husband & wife team of Rabbi Yitzchok Frankfurter (previously Torah Editor for Mishpacha) and Rechy Frankfurter (previously Mishpacha's American Desk Editor), founded the Ami Magazine.

According to a TGI (Target Group Index, a subsidiary of market research company Kantar Group) survey of September 2016, the Hebrew "Mishpacha" exposure rate is 24.1%. In light of this, it is the most popular Haredi weekly and weekend in Israel. A magazine "Te'imot" (tasting), which is also published by Mishpacha, is rated 6.7% according to this survey.

In the years 2011–2013, Hebrew Mishpacha released a Free newspaper which was distributed in the middle of the week, but its publication was halted due to pressure from religious leader Yosef Shalom Elyashiv, who protested against what he felt were distortions of Torah.

In 2014, Mishpacha launched an online edition.

=== English edition ===
The English Mishpacha launched in 2004 with a weekly package including the flagship Mishpacha magazine and Mishpacha Junior. Mishpacha was the first full-color weekly magazine targeting the Anglo-Orthodox population worldwide, with the standalone children's magazine also serving as an innovation. Family First, introduced to the package in 2005, was also the first of its kind, a full-color weekly magazine by and for Jewish women.

Mishpacha frequently addresses social problems. For example, it has addressed issues such as the shababniks (Haredi street youth) and violence in the family; and has waged a battle against educational institutions’ discrimination against Mizrahim and the newly religious. But it brings up these issues without mentioning names, so no one will be hurt.

Mishpacha Group's publications tend to not print photos of women. There have been exceptions to this. For example, when Hillary Clinton was running for president against Donald Trump, the magazine chose to print her face, although both candidates' faces were stylistically distorted by a blue field.

Some attribute the significant increase in Haredim joining Israel's army to Mishpacha as well as mental health awareness and mental health services access over the past decade amongst Orthodox Jewish populations to the public dialogue stimulated by Mishpacha magazines and other Jewish publications such as Ami. Mishpacha has been banned by many rabbinical leaders including Rabbi Yosef Shalom Elyashiv. However, Mishpacha has turned to the rabbinical court of the Haredi community (Badatz) which forbade harassment of the magazine. Haaretz, the newspaper of Israel's secular left, describes the Hebrew version of Mishpacha as one of the "most powerful" newspapers in the Haredi community.

==== Contributors ====
Some of the popular contributors to the English version of Mishpacha are noted authors Yisroel Besser and Yonasan (Jonathan) Rosenblum, political editor Binyomin Rose, Jewish historian Yehuda Geberer, educator Yakov Horowitz, and former Ami White House correspondent Jake Turx.
