= Daniel Gad =

Israeli actor

- דניאל גד
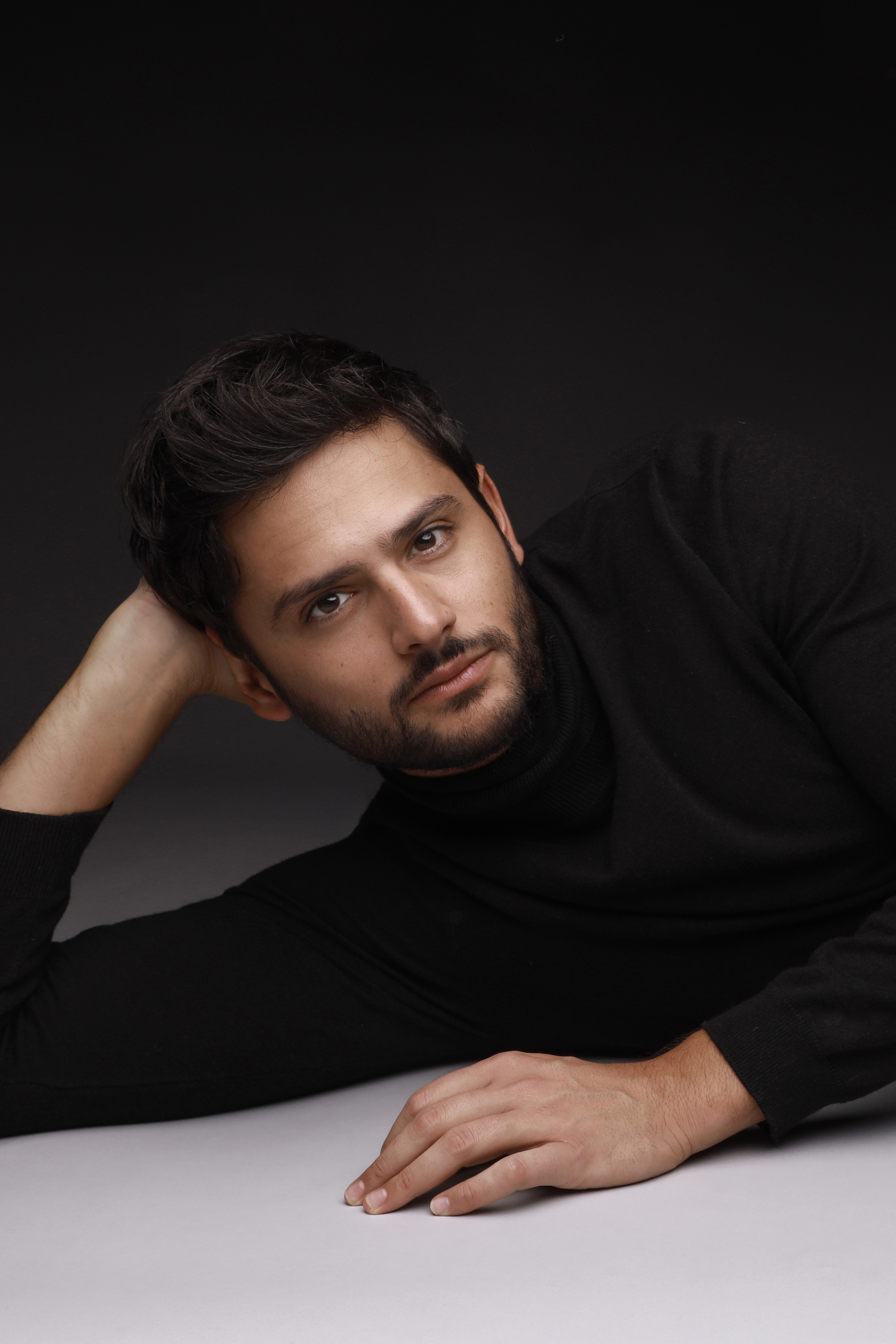
- Born: December 9, 1990 (age 35); Rehovot, Israel
- Occupations: Actor, singer

Daniel Gad (Hebrew: דניאל גד; born 9 December 1990) is an Israeli actor and singer. He is best known for starring in the dramatic teen series Galis and the hit Israeli comedy series, Shababnikim (2017–2025).

== Early life ==
He was born and raised in Rehovot to Jewish parents. His mother is of Iraqi-Libyan descent and his father is of Romanian-Polish descent. His father, Simcha Gad, is a former footballer who played for Maccabi Sha'arayim F.C. In his teens he appeared in youth theater productions in Rehovot and attended a secular school.

As a conscript in the Israel Defense Forces, he served with the Israeli military ensembles. After his service he studied acting at the Nissan Nativ Acting Studio in Tel Aviv.

== Career ==
In 2008 he made his film debut in the Israeli drama, Shiva, starring Ronit Elkabetz. He was a series regular on the children's series, Galis from 2012 to 2016. In 2013 he played the lead role in Farewell Baghdad, about the end of the Iraqi-Jewish community in Iraq. He also starred in the Hot musical youth series, Oboy from 2016 to 2019, regularly performing songs.

In 2017, he began playing Avinoam, the lead role in the Haredi comedy series, Shababnikim alongside Ori Laizerouvich, Omer Perelman Striks and Israel Atias. Two years later he starred in the critically acclaimed short film White Eye, which was nominated for the Academy Award for Best Live Action Short Film.

In 2021 he starred alongside Tzachi Halevy in the hit crime thriller series, Line in the Sand. In 2023 he starred alongside Michael Aloni in the Yom Kippur War drama, The Stronghold. The film has since been expanded into a 5-episode KAN series. Gad also recorded the theme tune for the series.

In 2025, he released his debut album, Dvar veHafoch, citing Arik Einstein and Ran Danker as influences. He was also encouraged by Shuli Rand to pursue music.

=== Filmography ===
Year	Title	Role	Notes
2008	Shiva		
2011	Downtown Precinct	Yuval Turgeman	2 episodes
2012	The Gordin Cell	Ofer	
2012 - 2016	Galis	Dori	Series regular
2013	Farewell Baghdad	Kabi	
2016	Wild Horses (Susey Pere)	Nati Avital	
2016	Galis: Connect		1 episode
2016 - 2019	Oboy	Tom Berger	Series regular
2017–2025	Shababnikim	Avinoam Lasri	Series regular
2018	McMafia	Ezra Levi	1 episode
2018	The Damned	Tomer	
2019	White Eye	Omer	Short film
2021	Line in the Sand (HaShotrim)	Yoav Keshti	Series regular
2021	Sky	Hagai	42 episodes
2021-present	Motek Bool BaEmtza	Halmon Shasha	Series regular (1-2)
2023	The Stronghold	Luit. Shlomo Erdinast	Film
2025	The Stronghold	Luit. Shlomo Erdinast	5-episode expanded TV series of original film
2026	Jerusalem '67	Moshe	Film

== Discography ==
=== Albums ===
- Dvar veHafoch (Hebrew: דבר והיפוכו) (2025)
