= Israel Atias =

Israeli actor

- ישראל אטיאס
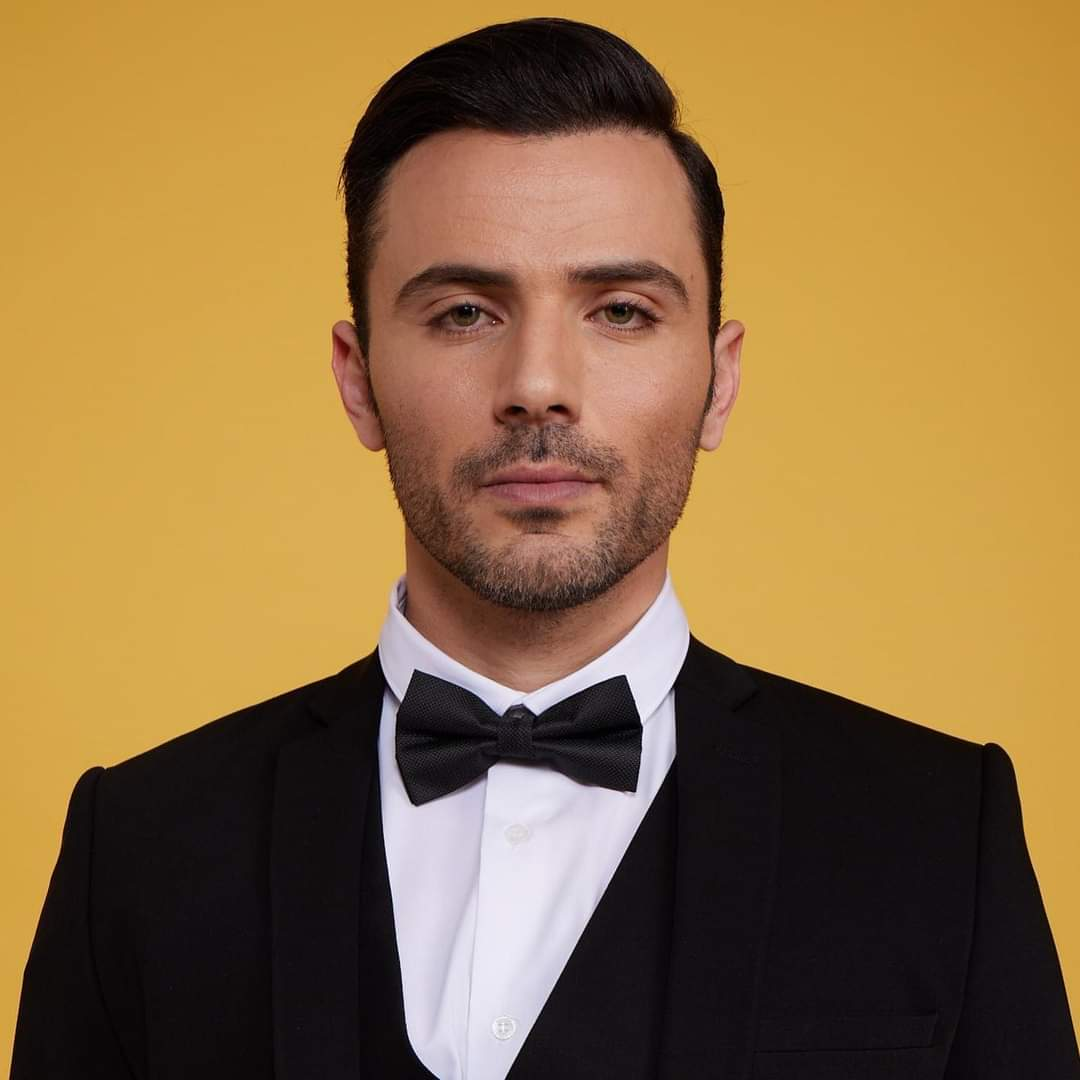
- Born: January 9, 1987 (age 39); Yavne, Israel
- Occupations: Actor, model
- Spouse: Naomi Idan
- Children: 2

Israel Atias (Hebrew: ישראל אטיאס; born 9 January 1987) is an Israeli film, television and stage actor and model. He is best known for starring in the hit Israeli comedy series, Shababnikim (2017–2025).

== Early life ==
Atias was born and raised in Yavne in Israel to Moroccan Jewish parents. He is named after the Moroccan Sephardic rabbi, Israel Abuhatzeira (Baba Sali). He graduated from Haderech Acting School and acted in several plays.

== Career ==
He has modeled for a number of fashion campaigns for Coca-Cola Zero, Prada, Dolce and Gabbana, and has appeared alongside high-profile models such as Adi Himelbloy. In 2026, he starred in a campaign for Castro jeans, with Bar Refaeli and Daniel Litman.

In 2014 - 2015, he played a series regular, Eviatar Zaguri in the HOT drama series, Zaguri Empire.

Since 2017, he has been part of the main cast of the Israeli hit series, Shababnikim on HOT. He plays Meir Sabag, a yeshiva student alongside Daniel Gad, Ori Laizerouvich and Omer Perelman Striks.

In 2021, he appeared in a music video for Eyal Golan.

In 2025 he starred alongside Rotem Sela in Red Alert, a drama series based on real life events from the October 7 attacks. The limited series was produced by American producer Lawrence Bender and will be released internationally by Paramount+ and on Channel 12 in Israel on October 7, 2025.

== Personal life ==
In July 2016, Atias married Naomi Idan. They have two sons together, born in 2021 and 2023. He is Shomer Shabbat.

He began observing Shabbat at age 22 and studies Torah and Hasidic philosophy, including teachings of the Baal Shem Tov.

== Filmography ==
Year	Title	Role	Notes
2013	Ptzuim BaRosh (Scarred)	Dudi	1 episode
2014 - 2015	Zaguri Imperia	Eviatar Zaguri	Series regular
2015	Mossad 101 (HaMidrasha)	Eyal Deri	1 episode
2015	Anachnu BaMapa	Shasha	5 episodes
2017	Masa Hatabaat (The Ring's Journey)	Behor	Film
2017 - 2025	Shababnikim	Meir Sabag	Series regular
2020 - 2021	Ziggy	Azulay	4 episodes
2021	HaYoreshet (The Heiress)	Maor	Series regular
2023	Running on Sand	Nir Zeituni	Film
2025	Red Alert	Kobi	Limited series
2026	The Big League	Eliran Ben Tovim	Film
2026	Tmunot Yafoeiyot 2 (Jaffa Stories 2)		Film
2026	American Henna	David	Film
2026	Lev Zahav		Film
