= Ori Laizerouvich =

Israeli actor

- 'אורי לייזרוביץ
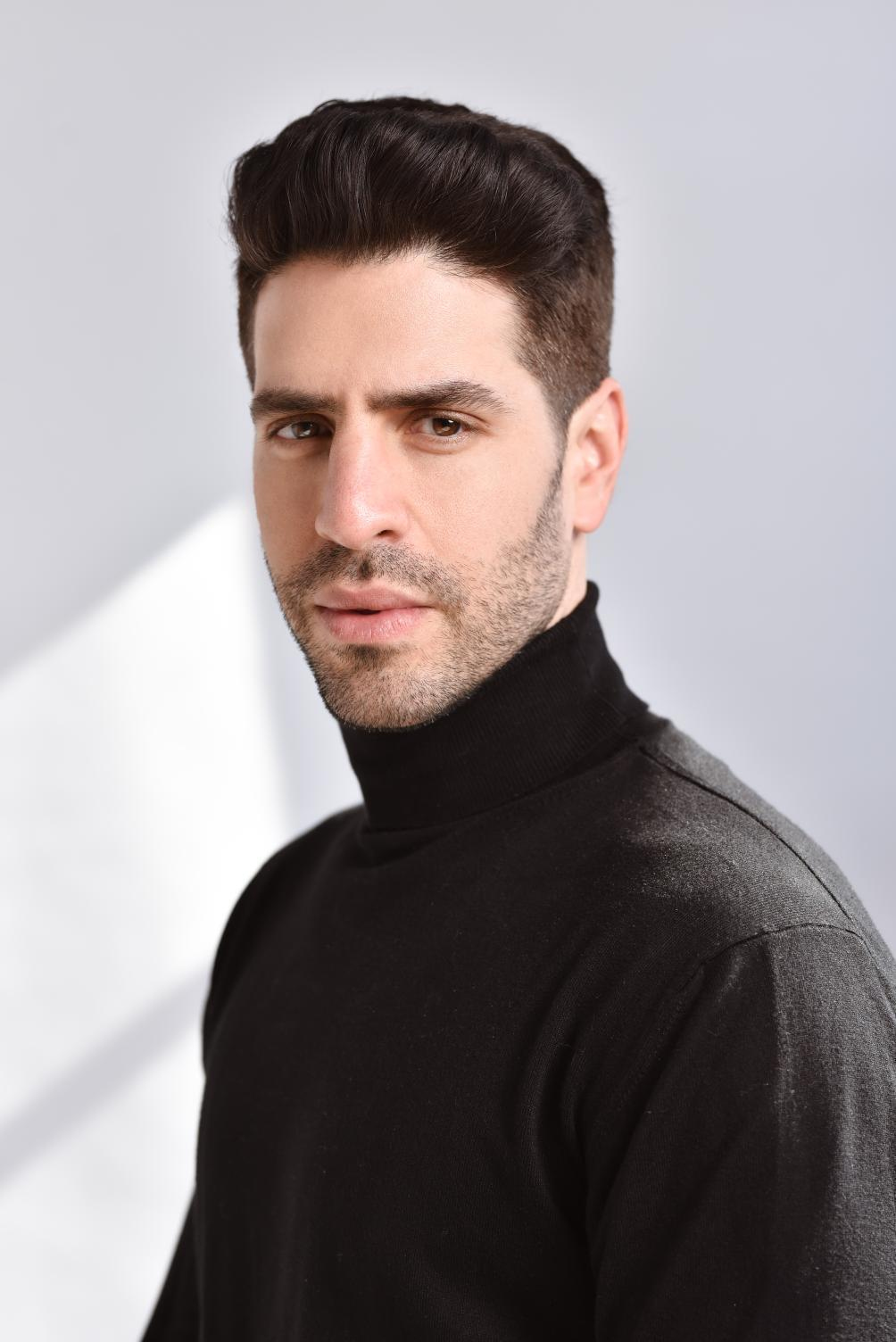
- Born: April 30, 1987 (age 38); Rishon LeZion, Israel
- Occupations: Actor, comedian
- Spouse: Erez Berger (2022-present)
- Children: 1 son

Ori Laizerouvich (Hebrew: אורי לייזרוביץ'; born 30 April 1987) is an Israeli actor and comedian. He is best known for starring in the hit Israeli comedy series, Shababnikim (2017–2025).

== Early life ==
His parents are both Jewish immigrants to Israel, with his mother coming from coming from Russia and his father coming from Poland. He studied at Amit Amal High School in Rishon LeZion. As a conscript in the Israel Defense Forces, he served in the technology unit of the Israel Police. He then studied at the Yoram Loewenstein Performing Arts Studio in Tel Aviv from 2009 to 2012.

== Career ==
He began his career on the stage, performing in several productions at the Orna Porat Theater for Children and Youth. He was also a field reporter on a number of youth television programs. In 2007, he participated in the sketches of the program "Shalom and Good Evening", broadcast on Channel 2.

From 2014 he played the role of Elbaz in the series Zaguri which was broadcast on Hot 3. In 2016, he starred in the comedy film, The Last Band in Lebanon. He also appeared alongside Ohad Knoller in the Reshet comedy series, Little Monsters (Miflatzot Ktanot ). In 2017, he appeared in Savi Gabizon's comedy-drama film, Longing, which was nominated for the Ophir Award for Best Film.

In 2017, he was cast as Gedaliah in the HOT series, Shababnikim alongside Daniel Gad, Israel Atias and Omer Perelman Striks. For his performance, the Israeli Television Academy awarded him the Best Actor in a Comedy Series award.

== Personal life ==
In 2021, Laizerouvich got engaged to his partner, Erez Berger, and on March 4, 2022, the pair married. In November 2023, the couple welcomed a son.

== Filmography ==
| Year | Title | Role | Notes |
|---|---|---|---|
| 2014 | Zaguri Imperia | Elbaz | TV series |
| 2015 | Laor | Maor | TV series |
| 2016 | Tzomet Miller | Photographer | TV series |
| 2016 | The Last Band in Lebanon | Assaf | |
| 2016 | Miflatzot Ktanot (Little Monsters) | Shahar | Series regular |
| 2017 | Two of Every Kind | Peacock #1 | Short film |
| 2017 | Longing | Miki | |
| 2017 | The Legend of King Solomon | Tobby | |
| 2017–2025 | Shababnikim | Gedaliah | Series regular |
| 2017 - 2018 | Pini's Hotel | Rudi | TV series |
| 2018 - 2019 | Kfula | Gershom Gershonski | Series regular |
| 2022 | Golda & Meir | Banda | Series regular |
