= Jerusalem '67 =

Upcoming film by Oded Raz

- Release poster
- Directed by: Oded Raz
- Written by: Linda Miriam Azamir; S.Y. Kadosh; Adva Reichman
- Produced by: Joseph Schick; Jacob Septimus
- Starring: Yael Grobglas; Daniel Gad; Guy Adler; Itzik Cohen
- Cinematography: Daniel Miller
- Edited by: Gilad Ariel; Shiri Borchard
- Music by: Ariel Blumenthal
- Release date: January 17, 2026 (Miami Jewish Film Festival)
- Running time: 109 minutes
- Countries: Israel; United States
- Language: English

Jerusalem '67 is an upcoming Israeli-American historical drama war film directed by Oded Raz, the first narrative feature film to depict the Six-Day War in 1967. It premiered at the Miami Jewish Film Festival on January 17, 2026. It stars Yael Grobglas, Daniel Gad, Guy Adler, and Itzik Cohen.

== Cast ==
- Yael Grobglas as Sarah
- Daniel Gad as Moshe
- Guy Adler as Avner
- Itzik Cohen as Rafi
- Diane Neal as Beth

== Production ==
=== Development ===
In May 2023, it was announced that Oded Raz would direct Jerusalem '67.

== Release ==
The world premiere was on January 17, 2026, at the Miami Jewish Film Festival.
