= Red Alert (TV series) =

Israeli limited television series

- Genre: Drama
- Created by: Lior Chefetz; Ruth Efroni
- Directed by: Lior Chefetz
- Starring: Rotem Sela; Israel Atias; Miki Leon; Hisham Sulliman; Chen Amsalem
- Country of origin: Israel
- Original language: Hebrew
- No. of seasons: 1
- No. of episodes: 4

Production
- Producer: Lawrence Bender
- Production company: Keshet Media Group

Original release
- Network: Channel 12; Paramount+
- Release: October 4, 2025 (Israel); October 7, 2025 (International)

Red Alert (Israeli title: First Light, Hebrew: אור ראשון, romanized: Or Rishon) is an Israeli television miniseries based on the October 7 attacks. It was created and directed by Lior Chefetz, and produced by Keshet Media Group and Lawrence Bender. The series premiered in Israel on October 5, 2025 on Channel 12. It was released internationally by Paramount+ on October 7, 2025, marking the second anniversary of the attacks. It received generally favourable reviews upon its release and has been championed by David Ellison, CEO of Paramount Skydance.

According to Keshet Media Group, it has become the most viewed drama on all Israeli TV channels in the past decade. In December 2025, it received a nomination for Best Foreign Language Series at the 31st Critics' Choice Awards.

== Premise ==
The four-part miniseries centers on the harrowing events of October 7, portraying the intersecting lives of civilians caught in the chaos. Among them is Bat Sheva (Sela), a mother fleeing with her daughters as her son is abducted; Ohad (Leon), a devoted father who becomes a symbol of ultimate sacrifice; and Ayoub (Sulliman), who mourns the loss of his wife while hiding with his infant behind enemy lines. The story also follows Nofar (Amsalem), a border police officer wounded while protecting others, and her colleague Liat. Kobi (Atias), an anti-terror officer, charges into danger to rescue his wife, while Tali (Sara Vino), a determined mother, becomes an unexpected hero in the search for her injured son, Itamar (Katan).

== Cast ==
- Rotem Sela as Bat Sheva Yahalomi
- Israel Atias as Kobi
- Miki Leon as Ohad Yahalomi
- Hisham Sulliman as Ayoub
- Chen Amsalem as Nofar
- Rotem Abuhav as Liat
- Sara Vino as Tali
- Nevo Katan as Itamar
- Shlomi Tapiero as David

== Production ==
Creators Efroni and Chefetz pursued the project as they were inspired by the stories of the October 8 survivors, telling Haaretz: "Creativity is our way as artists to try to understand the situation. The series is an artistic interpretation of the individual and national experience." They committed to the project once they received a blessing from survivors and families of murder victims.

In November 2024, it was confirmed that the project would be produced by American producer, Lawrence Bender. Bender has spoken about his motivation to produce the series: “What better way to tell the world what really happened? The world needs to be reminded of the truth. This is going to exist, and this will be here for the world to see." Efroni and Chefetz had not considered the series' value as hasbara when American philanthropists requested to be investors in the project. Chefetz explained that the series did not change significantly, and that the investors: "asked to introduce small changes that would enable non-Israelis to understand the events, but nothing more." He added that the philanthropists did not ask them "to show the magnitude of the horrors", and that the series is faithful to their interest "in seeing how October 7 is reflected on the faces of our protagonists, and not to recreate that day."

A pre-production creative decision was to decide on which of the survivor accounts would be retold on screen. Bender explained: “There are so many stories ... it wasn't an easy process. We wanted to find stories that we could, in a relatively small amount of episodes, show the beginning, middle, and the end with a hero.”

The actors met with survivors of the October 7 attack, whose stories they were recreating on the screen.

=== Filming ===
The series was shot on different locations in Israel, with principal photography beginning in spring 2025. Some of the filming took place in the Gaza envelope. The series was shot over 39 days.

The series also includes some real footage taken on October 7 in Israel.

== Release ==
The series premiered in Israel on October 5, 2025 on Channel 12.

The series released in the United States and internationally on October 7, 2025 through Paramount+.

== Reception ==
Review aggregation website Metacritic gave the series a score of 74 out of 100, based on reviews from 5 critics.

Daniel Fienberg of The Hollywood Reporter praised the series: "I'm honestly not quite sure which audience is going to crave a series like Red Alert, but I can vouch that despite occasional irritatingly visible attempts to evoke response, it's breathlessly effective."

James Poniewozik reviewed the series for The New York Times, praising Vino: "(Sara Vino is a standout in this last role, giving her character a human-scale, stubborn bravery.)". Poniewozik felt that the series "cannot avoid existing in a political environment." while acknowledging that "Artists, of course, are not governed by an equal-time rule. They are not obligated to tell every story, even when basing their work on real events." He continued to add that the series does "seek above all to ensure that the dead are not forgotten, with an air of duty and occasionally a mournful beauty." He concluded that the series is one of the "first-draft attempts to fix a single, terrible day in the cultural record, even as history keeps rolling forward."

On 1 October, 2025, the BBC grouped the series with One Day in October in its list of "11 of the best TV shows to watch this October."

In Israel, the series was praised by Roy Dahan writing in Maariv: "Red Alert managed to convey everything - the anxiety, the loss, but also the hope and strength that grew out of the darkness."

The series has been widely viewed in Israel, with the first episode watched by nearly 18% of the Israeli public. According to Keshet, it has become the most viewed drama on all Israeli TV channels in the past decade.

In December 2025, received a nomination for Best Foreign Language Series at the 31st Critics' Choice Awards.
