= The Swimmer (2021 film) =

- Promotional poster
- Directed by: Adam Kalderon
- Written by: Adam Kalderon
- Produced by: Mika Kalderon; Naama Pyritz
- Starring: Omer Perelman Striks; Asaf Jonas; Ofek Nicki-Cohen
- Cinematography: Ofer Inov
- Edited by: Guy Nemesh
- Music by: The Penelopes
- Production company: Ingenue Productions
- Distributed by: Strand Releasing
- Release dates: August 30, 2021 (Jerusalem Film Festival); October 7, 2022 (United States)
- Running time: 84 minutes
- Country: Israel
- Languages: Hebrew; English; Russian

The Swimmer is a 2021 Israeli sports drama written and directed by Adam Kalderon. Omer Perelman Striks stars as Erez, a gay competitive swimmer, grappling between desire and success. The film premiered at the Jerusalem Film Festival on 30 August 2021.

== Plot summary ==
Erez (Perelman Striks), a hot talent in the local swimming scene, enrolls at a tough training camp to further his dreams. Erez is pitted against the other swimmers, with the winner set to represent Israel at the Olympic Games. He develops a strong physical attraction towards Nevo, his rival at the camp. This attraction will unravel his ambitions and focus in the swimming pool.

== Cast and characters ==
- Omer Perelman Striks as Erez
- Asaf Jonas as Nevo Yasur
- Roy Reshef as Nadav
- Nadia Kucher as Paloma
- Gal Ben Amra as Yoav
- Igal Reznik as Dime

== Reception ==
The film was well received by critics and holds a 92% "fresh" rating on Rotten Tomatoes. Kyle Turner of The New York Times wrote that Kalderon: “renders his film ‘The Swimmer’ with style and rich psychology." Turner continued,“Kalderon finds the intensity of desire and competition in the cracks of the statue." Carlos Aguilar of the Los Angeles Times praised it as "a brightly colored and cleverly erotic queer sports drama."

Perelman Striks was awarded the Best Actor award at the Jerusalem Film Festival in 2021.

== Release ==
The film first premiered at the Jerusalem Film Festival on 30 August 2021. It has also been screened at the following film festivals; Palm Springs International Film Festival, UK Jewish Film Festival, BFI Flare: London LGBTIQ+ Film Festival, Golden Horse Film Festival and Awards, Tallinn Black Nights Film Festival, Chéries-Chéris and the Hong Kong Lesbian & Gay Film Festival. It also received a limited theatrical release in the United States on 7 October 2022.

The film was also released for streaming in Australia by the Special Broadcasting Service.
