= The Cops (Israeli TV series) =

Israeli television series

- Hebrew: השוטרים
- Genre: Psychological thriller; Serial drama
- Created by: Rotem Shamir; Yuval Yefet
- Country of origin: Israel
- Original language: Hebrew
- No. of seasons: 1
- No. of episodes: 8

Production
- Running time: 52–60 minutes
- Production company: Keshet Media Group

Original release
- Network: Channel 12
- Release: 25 January 2021

The Cops (Hebrew: השוטרים, romanized: Ha-Shotrim, lit. 'The Cops') is an Israeli television drama series made by Keshet and originally aired on Israel's Channel 12 from 25 January 2021. The series was created by Rotem Shamir and Yuval Yefet. It was directed by Rotem Shamir and the lead screenwriter is Yuval Yefet. The series was filmed mostly in the northern Israel, and was inspired by real events that occurred during the "Avenging Cops" affair in Nahariya in 2006.

== Background ==
The "Avenging Cops" affair, also known as the "Criminals in Uniform" case, was a criminal affair that took place in Israel during the years 2005–2006. After several incidents of grenade attacks on the local police station and attacks on policemen's houses, several policemen from the city of Nahariya manufactured and detonated explosive devices in an apartment and a vehicle belonging to Michael Mor, head of the local criminal organization. The grenade attacks were attributed, according to the "Avenging Cops", to Mor's organization. This is despite the fact that no indictments have been filed in those cases.

The cops were:

- Superintendent Yaniv Ashur, a detective serving as the head of the detective unit at the Nahariya police, and later serving as a detective at the Galilee Police Station.
- Sergeant Major Yossi Levy, Intelligence Coordinator at the Nahariya Police.
- Corporal Rami Musa, Intelligence Coordinator at the Acre Police.
- First Sergeant Major Eldad Hadad, detective at the Galilee Police Station.
- "M", a policeman who flipped, turned a state's evidence and indicted his partners. As part of the plea deal, "M" was sentenced to six months of community service.
- Another contestant is Ran Kroiter, a citizen who acquitted of all charges.

On 13 July 2009, Ashur, Levy, Musa and Hadad, were found guilty and were sentenced to one year in prison and another year of probation.

== Synopsis ==
Alon Shenhav, an outstanding detective officer who grow up in Nahariya and moved to Tel Aviv-Yafo, is asked to return to his hometown and serve as a detective officer for a year. Upon his return, he discovers that Maor Ezra runs a local crime organization that is terrorising in the city. Alon understands that in order to take Ezra down, he must first restore the public status of the police in the city.

== Cast and characters ==
=== The Sharabi-Shenhav family ===
- Alon Shenhav (Tzachi Halevy) – An outstanding detective officer from Nahariya who moved to Tel Aviv-Yafo. He changed his last name from "Sharabi" to "Shenhav". He is asked to return to his hometown to work there as a detective officer for a year to get a chance to study abroad.
- Mickey Shenhav (Shani Cohen) – Alon's wife.
- Tom Shenhav (Aviv Buchler) – The teenage daughter of Alon and Mickey, an 11th grade student.
- Oved Sharabi (Uri Gavriel) – Alon's father, a retired policeman.
- Mrs. Sharabi (Rita Shukron) – Alon's mother, lives with her husband in Nahariya.

=== Israeli Police ===
- Yehuda Poleg (Micha Selektor) – Chief of the Nahariya Station.
- Shmuel Weinberg (Nathan Datner) – Chief of Northern District
- Ami Atia (Eli Finish) – a policeman in the Nahariya police, knows Alon from the high school period.
- Kobi Edri (Maor Shwitzer) – Intelligence Coordinator.
- Reuven (Danny Shteg) – a policeman in the Nahariya police.
- Yoav (Daniel Gad) – a young policeman in the Nahariya police.

=== Criminal Organization ===
- Maor Ezra (Shlomi Yifrach) – a young criminal who heads a local criminal organization. His character is based on the actual Israeli criminal, Michael Mor.
- Bauman (Dor Harari) – the right hand of Maor, the brain of the organization.
- Nissan (Nimrod Hochnberg) – Senior soldier in the organization, third rib for Maor and Bauman. Psychopath and the main operator of the organization. Maor's secret man, who runs the night clubs and casinos.

=== Additional characters ===
- Sigal Alfasi (Hadar Ratzon-Rotem) – Alon's ex. Principal of the School where Tom attends.

== Broadcasting ==
Episode No. in the Series	Episode No. in the Season	Title	Original date premiere	Rating		Source
Episode No. in the Series	Episode No. in the Season	Title	Original date premiere	%	Watches	Source
Season 1
1	1	Nahariya	25 January 2021	21.5%	617,000	
2	2	Game Roles	26 January 2021	17.7%	514,000	
3	3	Into The Night	1 February 2021	21.2%	536,000	
4	4	Fire	8 February 2021	19.4%	565,000	
5	5	Far Away	15 February 2021	18.6%	535,000	
6	6	Cleaning the Stables	22 February 2021	17%	424,000	
7	7	Harvest Festival	1 March 2021	18.3%	475,000	
8	8	The Truth	8 March 2021	17.8%	481,000	
Season 2
9	1	Back to Nahariya	13 June 2023	12.6%	358,000	
10	2	Tests	20 June 2023	13.5%	385,000	
11	3	Mexico	27 June 2023	14.2%	417,000	
12	4	The Ultimatum	4 July 2023	11.3%	338,000	
13	5	Complicated Romance	11 July 2023	11.5%	338,000	
14	6	The Cops Are Exposed	18 July 2023	11%	301,000	
15	7	The Meeting	1 August 2023	11.1%	303,000	
16	8	End Of The Line	7 August 2023	12.2%	382,000	

== See also ==
- Cops (TV program), an American docuseries television program
- The Cops (British TV series), a 1998–2001 British crime drama
