= Galis =

- Genre: Drama
- Created by: David Dachan; Ido Dror
- Written by: David Dachan; Ido Dror
- Directed by: Oded Raz; Aviad Kaydar (Seasons 6-7)
- Starring: Tuval Shafir; Eliana Tidhar; Daniel moreshet Daniel Gad; Shiran Sendel; Neve Tzur
- Theme music composer: Ido Riblin; Ilan Rosenfeld
- Opening theme: "Galis Theme Song" performed by Aviho Shabat (Seasons 1-3); Roni Dalumi (Season 4-7)
- Country of origin: Israel
- Original language: Hebrew
- No. of seasons: 7
- No. of episodes: 213 (list of episodes)

Production
- Executive producer: Rachel Farn
- Producer: Jehonatan Farn
- Production locations: Neve Ilan, Israel
- Cinematography: Daniel Kadem; Yaron Benisty
- Editors: Idit Farn-Wise; Michal Farn; Aviad Kaydar
- Running time: 21-31 minutes
- Production company: Dory Media Drast Productions

Original release
- Network: Arutz HaYeladim (HOT)
- Release: February 12, 2012 – July 17, 2016

Related
- The Dreamers; Galis: Quest for Astra Galis: Connect

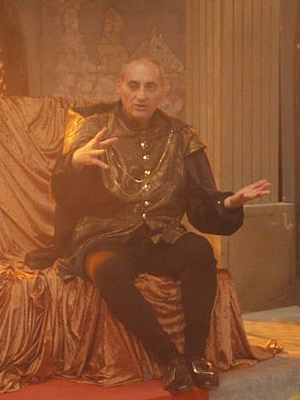
Photo from the set of the TV series Galis.

Galis (Hebrew: גאליס) is an Israeli youth series broadcast from February 12, 2012, the children's channel subscribers HOT. The series focuses upon an Israeli summer camp called Galis, and the adventures of campers to the Treasure of Sargon, the Boards of Fate and the Lost City of Galisia. Galis is a spin-off of the series The Dreamers which was on Kids channel, as well. In August 2014, the movie Galis: Quest for Astra was released. On April 14, 2016, the second Galis movie, Galis: Connect, was released. On May 30, 2016, the seventh and final season of the series premiered and concluded on July 17, 2016.

== Plot summary ==
The series follows Yonathan Mitrani and his friends as they navigate the challenges of a summer camp called "Galiss." Unknown to them, Yonathan is being manipulated by his grandfather, Simon, who wants to obtain mystical "Fate Tablets." As the camp unfolds, personal relationships develop and complicate among various characters, including love triangles, secrets, and betrayals.

Yonathan discovers a lost city called "Galicia," which he must save from a villain named Zarda, who has frozen its inhabitants. Throughout the series, he grapples with identity, loyalty, and the responsibilities of leadership while dealing with the consequences of his relationships with Dany, Rona, and other campmates.

As the narrative progresses, themes of friendship, sacrifice, and redemption emerge, particularly as Jonathan seeks to rescue his mother from the clutches of Zarda and confronts the complex dynamics of friendship and betrayal. Ultimately, the characters face challenges that test their bonds and lead to self-discovery, culminating in dramatic confrontations that affect the fate of both the camp and Galicia.

== Characters ==
=== Campers ===
- Yonathan Miterani (Tuval Shafir) - Comes from the foster home to Camp Galis. He finds a portrait of him engraved in a cave, and realizes that it is related to the Treasure of Sargon. In the final episode of the first season, Jonathan discovers that Ari is his biological father, and Nina is his stepsister. In the second season, Jonathan participates in team Achilles, and goes on a quest to find his biological mother. His relationship with Danny has many ups and downs, yet they become engaged in the series finale.
- Daniella "Dani” Rubin (Eliana Tidhar) - Jonathan's girlfriend and goes to camp with him. During the series, she is bitten by a snake and sent to the hospital for two days, but then Danny finds out she is trapped in the hospital, and within two days she escapes from the hospital and hides in the camp's storage room. She uses Liam and tells him to inform Jonathan, and Jonathan finally proves it. kidnapped by Simon and released after a rescue operation. In the second season, Dani participates in team Athena. In the series finale, she became engaged with Yonathan.
- Liam Ben Basat (Daniel Moreshet) - Jonathan's friend that comes with him to camp. He's the brother of Miron and Eshel. During the first season, he dates Sharon. In the second season, Liam is in team Achilles. Sharon breaks up with him over a misunderstanding, and he becomes Natalie's boyfriend, only to be tricked by her for revenge. Eventually dates Yuli.
- Nina Brown (Lior Cohen) - Daughter of the camp directors, selling all the meters in the forest. Jonathan's stepsister. In the second season, she leads the team Athena, and rivals Alex. They eventually start dating. She moves to Australia at the beginning of the fourth season, yet she returns for the series finale with Alex.
- Eduard/Barak Henis (Omri Lucas) - Prince of Galisia. Claims that his parents abandoned him in the woods as a child. Jonathan and Danny find him in the woods and bring him to camp Galis. He takes the identity of Barak Henis, a possible camper that hasn't arrived. He participates in team Athena. In the first part of the season, he became Danny's boyfriend. His mother is Zerda and his father is Ikra, Queen and King of Galisia, respectively.
- Dori Aharoni (Daniel Gad) - The leader of the "cool kids", and Yuli's boyfriend. Dory has a blood clotting disorder. At the end of the second half of the first season, he becomes Rona's boyfriend. In the second season, he participates in team Athena, and wants to try out for Maccabi Tel Aviv. Was Daphne's boyfriend in the second and third seasons, And in the fourth season, became Dani's boyfriend. Eventually dates Rona.
- Yuli Sa'ar (Shiran Sendel) - A model and Dori's girlfriend. Before the start of camp, her mother married a gardener, with one daughter, named Rona, whom Yuli treats like a servant. During the series, she is selected to be a presenter of the campaign 'milk Time ", yet she ends up giving up the job. Her image is ruined after it is revealed that Rona sang for her in a video. In the second season, Yuli is becoming nice, participation Achilles.
- Hugo (Neve Tzur) - The oldest child in the camp. Diagnosed at a young age gifted and catapulted two classes. Adi's boyfriend. In the second season, the team participates Hugo Athena, and promised to help Dory admission department, provided broadcasts will be the partner of Daphne.
- Natalie Rooas (Shani Atias) - arriving to camp to revenge her family's loss of gold to Meron Ben Basat, Liam's older brother and find out where Meron is hiding. Natalie will not hesitate to use any tool available, even if it means she needs to pretend to fall in love with Liam and be his girlfriend. Coming from a criminal family, she will not go back home without completing the mission she was ordered to do.
- Adi Denzinger (Maya Koren) - Danziger chef's daughter and sister of Daphne. Hugo's partner. The first season is coming mission Hsu - Chef with her father, and Hugo helped her get elected by Ari and Amalia to be chef of the camp. In the second season, the team participates in committees Achilles, And hides from her sister, Daphne, the fact that she and Hugo are in a relationship.
- Dafni Denzinger (Gaya Traub) - A home chef and Adi's sister. With low self-confidence and often falter. She thinks her stuttering make it unusual and different. Her sister, Adi, is tries to protect her and hides her relationship with Hugo from her.
- Alex Shmuelov (Maor Schwietzer) - Team Leader Achilles. Son of the CEO of a successful company. His father sent him from the Galis to see if Alex was unfit to his girlfriend. Alex promised his father he would win every task and prove to him that he could be proud of. To perform his promise He cheats tasks. Third season, Alex became Nina's boyfriend and helps his father and his sister Sivan 'take over' the camp.
- Rona Dayan (Mor Polanuer) - Yuli’s stepsister, who treats her like a servant. In the first season, Rona is the only camper that knows about Dori's blood clotting problem and helps him hide it. At the end of the second half of the first season, she dates Dori. Moves to a music summer school in London at the beginning of the third season. She returns later, and she and Dori continue dating, yet they break up and she returns to London. Returns in the sixth season, and reconciles with Dori in the series' final season.
- Sharon (Tamar Amit Yosef) - Yuli's best friend in the first season. Had an affair with Ro'i. Liam's girlfriend in the first season. In the second season, she leaves the camp and works as a producer, and then returns to Ro'i and flies with him to Mexico. Returns to Galis during the sixth season to try to close Galis for good with Ro'i, yet their plans are foiled and she is fired.
- Gaya (Shira Naor) - Gaia lives Galis along with her brother, Vulcan and hiding from ikra and Lazard, who think she's dead. Third season becomes campers and cooperates with Lazard.
- Maya Nuriel (Roni Daloomi) - Seasons 4-5
- Udi Kurman (Ben Ravid) - Seasons 4-5
- Erez Bar'el (Omer Dror) - Seasons 4-5
- Rotem Tischler (Maya Shoef) - Seasons 4-5
- Gili Angel (Meital Michaely) - Seasons 4-5
- David Ston (Nir Strauss) - Season 6

=== Camp Instructors ===
- Ari Mitarni (Guy Zo-Aretz) - The owner of the camp, father of Jonathan, stepfather of Nina and partner of her mother, Amalia. Pushed by Simon quickly in the desert and got amnesia. Wants to find the Panels of Fate to know his true past.
- Mika (Dana Frider) - Instructor at Galis for the Olympus Group, and is responsible for the children. Her heart broke when her ex-boyfriend cheated on her. Met Benjamin, and eventually fell in love with him.
- Amalia Brown (Hadas Kladeron) - Nina's mother, daughter of Simon, partner of Ari and Jonathan's stepmother. She is the camp doctor. Her father founded Camp Galis. In the second season she leaves Galis to take care of her father.
- Ben Berg (Tomer Kapon) - The youngest child in foster care, who asked stone will wish everything's normal, "but in his heart he wanted to be a teenager and became a boy. Roy replaced as a guide to the Olympus Group. Member of a secret keepers of Mika and her partner.
- Ilya Ben shushan (Or Ben Melech) - Drunk father and his mother a housewife and therefore dropped out of school to help his mother raise his younger sister. Was employed by the family of Natalie, in order to make money. Employed by Ari as a maintenance worker at Galis. Adi teaches him to read and write.

== Series overview ==
Season	Episodes	Originally aired	
Season	Episodes	First aired	Last aired
1	60	February 12, 2012	August 7, 2012
2	27	December 9, 2012	January 22, 2013
3	29	June 16, 2013	July 31, 2013
4	25	March 16, 2014	May 12, 2014
Movie		August 7, 2014	
5	25	February 15, 2015	March 29, 2015
6	26	December 15, 2015	January 25, 2016
Movie 2		April 14, 2016	
7	21	May 30, 2016	July 17, 2016
