= Omer Perelman Striks =

Israeli actor

- עומר פרלמן שטריקס
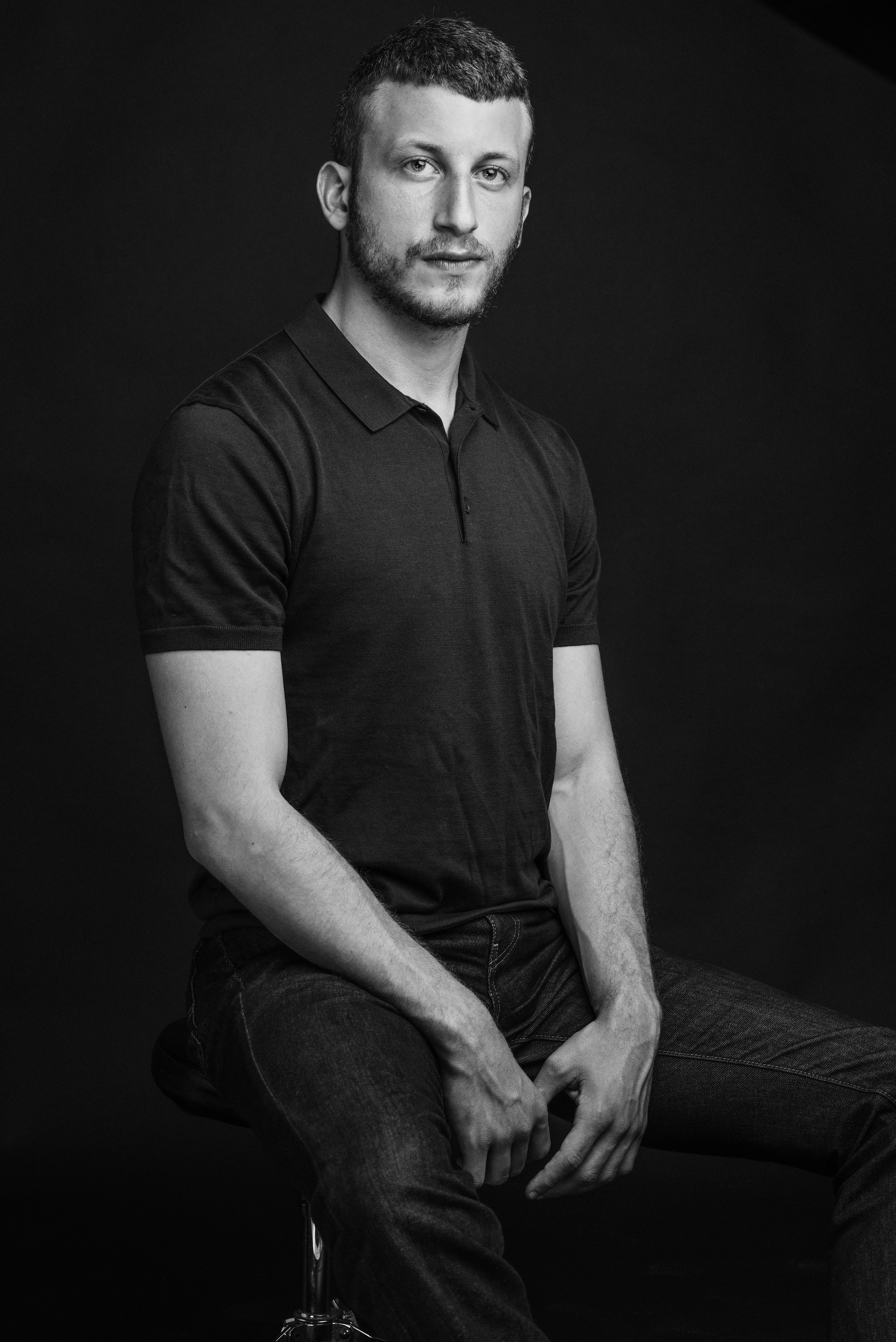
- Born: Omer Perelman Striks; July 20, 1993 (age 32); Tel Aviv, Israel
- Occupation: Actor

Omer Perelman Striks (Hebrew: עומר פרלמן שטריקס; born 20 July 1993) is an Israeli actor. He is best known for starring in the hit Israeli comedy series, Shababnikim (2017–2025).

== Early life ==
He was born and raised in Tel Aviv in Israel. He studied at the Thelma Yellin High School of Arts before graduating from the Yoram Loewenstein Performing Arts Studio in Tel Aviv. His mother was a school psychologist and committed suicide when he was twelve years old.

== Career ==
In 2014 he was cast alongside Michael Aloni and Angel Bonanni as a series regular in the Israeli youth series, Shovrei Galim on Yes.

In 2017 he was cast as a series regular, playing Dov Laser, a yeshiva student in the hit Israeli series, Shababnikim alongside Daniel Gad, Ori Laizerouvich and Israel Atias.

Perelman was awarded the Best Actor prize at the Jerusalem Film Festival in 2021 for his performance in The Swimmer.

== Personal life ==
He is gay and since 2018 has been in a relationship with the Israeli architect, Raanan Stern. He identifies as secular.

== Filmography ==
| Year | Title | Role | Notes |
|---|---|---|---|
| 2012 | S#x Acts | Yoav | |
| 2012 - 2013 | Summer Break Diaries | Assi | 2 episodes |
| 2014 | Self Made | Ido | |
| 2014 | Marzipan Flowers | Bebber | |
| 2014 | Shovrei Galim | Bebber | Series regular |
| 2016 | Confess | Boy | 1 episode |
| 2017 - 2025 | Shababnikim | Dov Laser | Series regular |
| 2018 | Not What You Think (Lo Hakol Varod) | Michael | |
| 2018 | The Bar Mitzvah | | 3 episodes |
| 2019 | The Male Gaze: The Heat of the Night | Omer Perelman | Segment "Hardcore" |
| 2019 | Incitement | Wineberg | |
| 2020 | Valley of Tears | Nimrod Caspi | Series regular |
| 2020 - 2024 | Manayek | Yoel Schwartz | Series regular |
| 2021 | The Swimmer | Erez | Jerusalem Film Festival award for Best Actor |
| 2021 | ReFeel | | Short film |
| 2022 | Munich Games | Mano Gur-Zeev | 4 episodes |
| 2023 | See You 'Round the Block | Eitan | Short film, Tel Aviv International Student Film Festival award for Best Actor |
| 2024 | Mosolov's Suitcase | | Post-production |
