= Ishak Saporta =

Professor of business ethics at Tel Aviv University

Ishak Saporta (Hebrew: יצחק ספורטא; born 12 April 1957) is a professor of business ethics at Tel Aviv University.

He was born to parents who immigrated to Israel from Turkey. Saporta has degrees in psychology, philosophy and labor studies. In 1995, he earned a PhD from the University of California, Berkeley in labor relations and organizational behavior. Saporta is a senior lecturer in the management faculty of Tel Aviv University. Saporta is a social activist and a board member of Adva Center for equality research in Israel. He has been a member of Hakeshet Hademokratit Hamizrahit since its foundation in 1996.

In 2003, Saporta and Yossi Dahan Haokets(Hebrew for "sting") which surveys social and economic trends in Israel from a social-democrat point of view.
