= List of Galis episodes =

This is a list of episodes for the television series Galis.

== Series overview ==
Season	Episodes	Originally released	
Season	Episodes	First released	Last released
1	60	February 12, 2012	August 7, 2012
2	27	December 9, 2012	January 22, 2013
3	29	June 16, 2013	July 31, 2013
4	25	March 16, 2014	May 12, 2014
Film		August 7, 2014	
5	25	February 15, 2015	March 29, 2015
6	26	December 15, 2015	January 25, 2016
Film		April 14, 2016	
7	21	May 30, 2016	July 17, 2016

== Episode list ==
=== Season 1 (2012) ===
No. overall	No. in season	Title	Original release date
1	1	Episode 1	February 12, 2012
2	2	Episode 2	February 13, 2012
3	3	Episode 3	February 14, 2012
4	4	Episode 4	February 15, 2012
5	5	Episode 5	February 19, 2012
6	6	Episode 6	February 20, 2012
7	7	Episode 7	February 21, 2012
8	8	Episode 8	February 22, 2012
9	9	Episode 9	February 26, 2012
10	10	Episode 10	February 27, 2012
11	11	Episode 11	February 28, 2012
12	12	Episode 12	February 29, 2012
13	13	Episode 13	March 4, 2012
14	14	Episode 14	March 5, 2012
15	15	Episode 15	March 6, 2012
16	16	Episode 16	March 7, 2012
17	17	Episode 17	March 11, 2012
18	18	Episode 18	March 12, 2012
19	19	Episode 19	March 13, 2012
20	20	Episode 20	March 14, 2012
21	21	Episode 21	March 18, 2012
22	22	Episode 22	March 19, 2012
23	23	Episode 23	March 20, 2012
24	24	Episode 24	March 21, 2012
25	25	Episode 25	March 25, 2012
26	26	Episode 26	June 10, 2012
27	27	Episode 27	June 11, 2012
28	28	Episode 28	June 12, 2012
29	29	Episode 29	June 13, 2012
30	30	Episode 30	June 17, 2012
31	31	Episode 31	June 18, 2012
32	32	Episode 32	June 19, 2012
33	33	Episode 33	June 20, 2012
34	34	Episode 34	June 24, 2012
35	35	Episode 35	June 25, 2012
36	36	Episode 36	June 26, 2012
37	37	Episode 37	June 27, 2012
38	38	Episode 38	July 1, 2012
39	39	Episode 39	July 2, 2012
40	40	Episode 40	July 3, 2012
41	41	Episode 41	July 4, 2012
42	42	Episode 42	July 8, 2012
43	43	Episode 43	July 9, 2012
44	44	Episode 44	July 10, 2012
45	45	Episode 45	July 11, 2012
46	46	Episode 46	July 15, 2012
47	47	Episode 47	July 16, 2012
48	48	Episode 48	July 17, 2012
49	49	Episode 49	July 18, 2012
50	50	Episode 50	July 22, 2012
51	51	Episode 51	July 23, 2012
52	52	Episode 52	July 24, 2012
53	53	Episode 53	July 25, 2012
54	54	Episode 54	July 29, 2012
55	55	Episode 55	July 30, 2012
56	56	Episode 56	July 31, 2012
57	57	Episode 57	August 1, 2012
58	58	Episode 58	August 5, 2012
59	59	Episode 59	August 6, 2012
60	60	Episode 60	August 7, 2012

=== Season 2 (2012–13) ===
No. overall	No. in season	Title	Original release date
61	1	Episode 61	December 9, 2012
62	2	Episode 62	December 10, 2012
63	3	Episode 63	December 11, 2012
64	4	Episode 64	December 12, 2012
65	5	Episode 65	December 16, 2012
66	6	Episode 66	December 17, 2012
67	7	Episode 67	December 18, 2012
68	8	Episode 68	December 19, 2012
69	9	Episode 69	December 23, 2012
70	10	Episode 70	December 24, 2012
71	11	Episode 71	December 25, 2012
72	12	Episode 72	December 26, 2012
73	13	Episode 73	December 30, 2012
74	14	Episode 74	December 31, 2012
75	15	Episode 75	January 1, 2013
76	16	Episode 76	January 2, 2013
77	17	Episode 77	January 6, 2013
78	18	Episode 78	January 7, 2013
79	19	Episode 79	January 8, 2013
80	20	Episode 80	January 9, 2013
81	21	Episode 81	January 13, 2013
82	22	Episode 82	January 14, 2013
83	23	Episode 83	January 15, 2013
84	24	Episode 84	January 16, 2013
85	25	Episode 85	January 20, 2013
86	26	Episode 86	January 21, 2013
87	27	Episode 87	January 22, 2013

=== Season 3 (2013) ===
No. overall	No. in season	Title	Original release date
88	1	Episode 88	June 16, 2013
89	2	Episode 89	June 17, 2013
90	3	Episode 90	June 18, 2013
91	4	Episode 91	June 19, 2013
92	5	Episode 92	June 23, 2013
93	6	Episode 93	June 24, 2013
94	7	Episode 94	June 25, 2013
95	8	Episode 95	June 26, 2013
96	9	Episode 96	June 30, 2013
97	10	Episode 97	July 1, 2013
98	11	Episode 98	July 2, 2013
99	12	Episode 99	July 3, 2013
100	13	Episode 100	July 7, 2013
101	14	Episode 101	July 8, 2013
102	15	Episode 102	July 9, 2013
103	16	Episode 103	July 10, 2013
104	17	Episode 104	July 14, 2013
105	18	Episode 105	July 15, 2013
106	19	Episode 106	July 16, 2013
107	20	Episode 107	July 17, 2013
108	21	Episode 108	July 21, 2013
109	22	Episode 109	July 22, 2013
110	23	Episode 110	July 23, 2013
111	24	Episode 111	July 24, 2013
112	25	Episode 112	July 28, 2013
113	26	Episode 113	July 29, 2013
114	27	Episode 114	July 30, 2013
115–116	28–29	Episodes 115–116	July 31, 2013

=== Season 4 (2014) ===
No. overall	No. in season	Title	Original release date
117	1	Episode 117	March 16, 2014
118	2	Episode 118	March 17, 2014
119	3	Episode 119	March 18, 2014
120	4	Episode 120	March 19, 2014
121	5	Episode 121	March 23, 2014
122	6	Episode 122	March 24, 2014
123	7	Episode 123	March 25, 2014
124	8	Episode 124	March 26, 2014
125	9	Episode 125	March 30, 2014
126	10	Episode 126	March 31, 2014
127	11	Episode 127	April 1, 2014
128	12	Episode 128	April 2, 2014
129	13	Episode 129	April 6, 2014
130	14	Episode 130	April 7, 2014
131	15	Episode 131	April 8, 2014
132	16	Episode 132	April 9, 2014
133	17	Episode 133	April 13, 2014
134	18	Episode 134	April 16, 2014
135	19	Episode 135	April 22, 2014
136	20	Episode 136	April 23, 2014
137	21	Episode 137	April 29, 2014
138	22	Episode 138	April 30, 2014
139	23	Episode 139	May 7, 2014
140	24	Episode 140	May 11, 2014
141	25	Episode 141	May 12, 2014

=== Season 5 (2015) ===
No. overall	No. in season	Title	Original release date
142	1	Episode 142	February 15, 2015
143	2	Episode 143	February 16, 2015
144	3	Episode 144	February 17, 2015
145	4	Episode 145	February 18, 2015
146	5	Episode 146	February 22, 2015
147	6	Episode 147	February 23, 2015
148	7	Episode 148	February 24, 2015
149	8	Episode 149	February 25, 2015
150	9	Episode 150	March 1, 2015
151	10	Episode 151	March 2, 2015
152	11	Episode 152	March 3, 2015
153	12	Episode 153	March 4, 2015
154	13	Episode 154	March 8, 2015
155	14	Episode 155	March 9, 2015
156	15	Episode 156	March 10, 2015
157	16	Episode 157	March 11, 2015
158	17	Episode 158	March 15, 2015
159	18	Episode 159	March 16, 2015
160	19	Episode 160	March 17, 2015
161	20	Episode 161	March 18, 2015
162	21	Episode 162	March 22, 2015
163	22	Episode 163	March 23, 2015
164	23	Episode 164	March 24, 2015
165	24	Episode 165	March 25, 2015
166	25	Episode 166	March 29, 2015

=== Season 6 (2015-2016) ===
No. overall	No. in season	Title	Original release date
167	1	Episode 167	December 15, 2015
168	2	Episode 168	December 15, 2015
169	3	Episode 169	December 16, 2015
170	4	Episode 170	December 20, 2015
171	5	Episode 171	December 21, 2015
172	6	Episode 172	December 22, 2015
173	7	Episode 173	December 23, 2015
174	8	Episode 174	December 27, 2015
175	9	Episode 175	December 28, 2015
176	10	Episode 176	December 29, 2015
177	11	Episode 177	December 30, 2015
178	12	Episode 178	January 3, 2016
179	13	Episode 179	January 4, 2016
180	14	Episode 180	January 5, 2016
181	15	Episode 181	January 6, 2016
182	16	Episode 182	January 10, 2016
183	17	Episode 183	January 11, 2016
184	18	Episode 184	January 12, 2016
185	19	Episode 185	January 13, 2016
186	20	Episode 186	January 17, 2016
187	21	Episode 187	January 18, 2016
188	22	Episode 188	January 19, 2016
189	23	Episode 189	January 20, 2016
190	24	Episode 190	January 24, 2016
191	25	Episode 191	January 25, 2016
192	26	Episode 192	January 25, 2016

=== Season 7 (2016) ===
No. overall	No. in season	Title	Original release date
193	1	Episode 193	May 30, 2016
194	2	Episode 194	May 31, 2016
195	3	Episode 195	June 5, 2016
196	4	Episode 196	June 6, 2016
197	5	Episode 197	June 7, 2016
198	6	Episode 198	June 13, 2016
199	7	Episode 199	June 14, 2016
200	8	Episode 200	June 19, 2016
201	9	Episode 201	June 20, 2016
202	10	Episode 202	June 21, 2016
203	11	Episode 203	June 26, 2016
204	12	Episode 204	June 27, 2016
205	13	Episode 205	June 28, 2016
206	14	Episode 206	July 3, 2016
207	15	Episode 207	July 4, 2016
208	16	Episode 208	July 5, 2016
209	17	Episode 209	July 10, 2016
210	18	Episode 210	July 11, 2016
211	19	Episode 211	July 12, 2016
212	20	Episode 212	July 17, 2016
