= White Eye =

- Poster
- Directed by: Tomer Shushan
- Screenplay by: Tomer Shushan
- Produced by: Shira Hochman; Kobi Mizrahi
- Starring: Dawit Tekelaeb; Daniel Gad
- Cinematography: Saar Mizrahi
- Edited by: Shira Hochman
- Music by: Joseph Shlomo
- Distributed by: Eroin Corp.
- Release date: October 2019 (Haifa Film Festival)
- Running time: 21 minutes
- Country: Israel
- Language: Hebrew

White Eye is a 2019 Israeli live-action short film by Tomer Shushan. It was nominated for Best Live Action Short Film at the 93rd Academy Awards.

== Summary ==
A man (Daniel Gad) in Tel Aviv finds his stolen bicycle and it now belongs to a stranger. In his attempts to retrieve the bicycle, he struggles to remain human.

== Accolades ==
- Academy Award for Best Live Action Short Film nomination
- International Cycling Film Festival – Both Best Film (Jury Award Goldene Kurbel) and Audience Award, 17th ICFF 2023
- SXSW Film Festival – Narrative Short Jury Award
- Palm Springs ShortFest

== See also ==
- Cinema of Israel
- List of Israeli submissions for the Academy Award for Best International Feature Film
