= Shababnikim =

Israeli comedy television series

- שבאבניקים
- Genre: Comedy-drama
- Created by: Eliran Malka; Danny Paran
- Starring: Daniel Gad; Ori Laizerouvich; Omer Perelman Striks; Israel Atias
- Country of origin: Israel
- Original language: Hebrew
- No. of seasons: 3
- No. of episodes: 39

Original release
- Network: HOT
- Release: December 24, 2017 – 2025

Shababnikim (Hebrew: שבאבניקים) is an Israeli television comedy series that aired on HOT in 2017 and 2018. The show includes 28 episodes, each around 30 minutes, focused on lives of four Haredi Jewish Yeshiva students. In January 2021, the first season began streaming internationally with English subtitles under the title The New Black. As of May 2023, the series airs on Israeli streaming television service ChaiFlicks.

It is named after the Hebrew term shababnik, which is used in Israel to describe a "trouble maker yeshiva boy".

A second season aired in North America in 2022. The third and final season aired in 2025.

== Premise ==
The show follows four Haredi yeshiva students in Jerusalem: Avinoam (Daniel Gad), who is the son of a Knesset member; Dov, nicknamed Lazer (Omer Perelman Striks), who comes from a wealthy family that primarily lives in New York City; Meir (Israel Attias), who comes from a poor Mizrahi/Sephardi family; and Gedaliah (Ori Laizerouvich), a nerdy and pious Torah scholar who joins the group. The show also includes Maya Wertheimer as Devorah, who is Lazer's sister and Gedaliah's love interest and--in season two--fiancee.

== Plot ==
The series follows the lives of four students at the ultra-Orthodox yeshiva "Netivot Avraham," where they study in a boarding school setting:

=== Season 1 ===
The story begins when Gedalya moves into their shared dorm room, as requested by Rabbi Bloch, the yeshiva’s supervisor, who hopes the group will help Gedalya open up. When their head rabbi, Rabbi Mordechai Bloch, dies in a tragic accident, his son inherits his position, but his educational approach clashes with the board’s. They appoint Rabbi Ashi Spitzer as a strict administrator, and after the friends inadvertently disrupt Spitzer’s relationship with donors, Spitzer expels Meir. In protest, the remaining trio launches a media campaign, which eventually leads Spitzer to reinstate Meir, though with conditions.

In parallel, the friends seek matches through matchmaker Shlomi Zaks, who encourages them to appear as learned as possible. However, Avinoam dates Shira, a secular waitress, and Meir becomes involved with Ruth, the daughter of donors, despite a failed match attempt with Dov. Gedalya is courted by Dov’s sister, Deborah.

At the season’s end, an intense conflict arises between Rabbi Bloch and Rabbi Spitzer, resulting in Spitzer firing Bloch, who then collapses from stress. Spitzer takes control of the yeshiva, but the four friends lead a rebellion that escalates to a tribunal with Rabbi Alter Cooper, who rules in their favor and reinstates Rabbi Bloch. However, to their surprise, Rabbi Bloch urges the group to leave the yeshiva for their own and the institution’s benefit.

=== Season 2 ===
Now expelled, the friends face a dilemma: they wish to find good matches and enjoy life, but no yeshiva will accept them. They find a loophole to create a “fictitious” yeshiva to avoid military draft and continue living comfortably. They establish this yeshiva in the secular Rehavia neighborhood, which angers the secular local residents.

Throughout the season, Gedaliah becomes the head of the new yeshiva and grows closer to Devorah, eventually becoming engaged despite their differences. Lazer becomes involved with Abigail, a divorced single mother, ending in heartbreak. Meir, ignoring Shlomi’s advice, becomes engaged to Ruth after she returns following an accident but struggles with their relationship. Meanwhile, Avinoam attempts to embrace a “modern” ultra-Orthodox identity.

In the season finale, Ruth becomes engaged to someone else, Gedaliah and Devorah split, and Avinoam, feeling rejected by the secular yeshiva, drunkenly joins Gedalya in bringing explosives to a secular yeshiva party, which lands them in jail. Avinoam gains online fame, but local residents file a petition to close their yeshiva. In court, Avinoam regrets his role, and Deborah confronts Gedalya. The two reconcile and re-engage.

The friends eventually agree with the neighbors to close the yeshiva, though two students stay on with the remaining group. The season closes as the four, carrying their suitcases, head toward the Western Wall together.

=== Season 3 ===
Avinoam, Meir and Dov “Laser” return to the very yeshiva from which they themselves were expelled, now faced with the task of saving it from closure.

They assume responsibility for a new generation of unruly students who reject the norms of yeshiva study, wrestling with the irony of having become caretakers of the institution they once resisted.

Meanwhile, Gedaliah settles into married life with Devorah and takes on a new role as a government inspector from the Ministry of Religious Services, tasked with evaluating and controlling the yeshiva’s operations. This creates tension when his father-in-law convinces him to fail the yeshiva, stripping it of much-needed funding.

== Cast and characters ==
=== Main ===
- Daniel Gad as Avinoam Lasri
- Ori Laizerouvich as Gedaliah
- Omer Perelman Striks as Dov Eliezer 'Laser' Brown
- Israel Atias as Meir Sabag
- Maya Wertheimer as Devorah Brown (recurring S1, main S2-S3)
- Guri Alfi as Shlomi Zacks (recurring S1, main S2)

=== Recurring ===
- Dov Navon as Rabbi Bloch
- Rotem Keinan as Rabbi Ashi Spitzer
- Golan Azulai as Eliyahu Lasri
- Shira Naor as Shira
- Shely Ben Josheph as Ruth Gottlieb
- Zohar Strauss as Ehud Stern

=== Notable guest stars ===
- Yehuda Levi as Yehuda Levi (S1)"

== Reception ==
The series has received broad critical acclaim in Israel and overseas. In Israel, the first season charted higher domestic ratings than Game of Thrones.

=== Season 1 ===
The show was nominated for awards in eight categories by the Israeli Academy of Film and Television, winning four, including Best Comedy, Best Comedy Script, and Best Comedy Actor.

Tablet magazine described the show as "funny, whimsical, and cutting" continuing "Stylistically, Malka [creator] trades soft-lens nostalgia for Tarantinoesque dark, even violent, comedy."

Mark I. Pinsky of Moment magazine, praised the show as "engaging and endearing". Pinsky added "At times, the series unfolds like a frum mash-up of Fast Times at Ridgemont High and Sex in the City—except in this case it’s “No Sex in the City.” Pinsky concluded: "The New Black is never predictable. Just when you think a crusty, rabbinical sage is going to blather on about the importance of tradition, he blinds you with some sophisticated romantic advice and a surprising ruling.

As in the best dramas, the characters deepen with each episode, becoming less cartoonish, fulfilling the requisite arc of transformation. The production values and acting are excellent."

=== Season 2 ===
Karen E.H. Skinazi praised the show in the Jewish Telegraphic Agency as a "wacky, stylized comedy with an excellent soundtrack and a whole new way of depicting the world of the yeshiva." The review continued: "But if fast-paced, laugh-out-loud “Shababnikim” distinguishes itself from the likes of “Shtisel,” full of melancholic plotlines and dreary music, it also stands apart because of the in-depth way it explores fault lines of race within haredi communities."

Sarah Rindner of the Jewish Review of Books wrote that the show "generally succeeds in transcending the stereotypes that are often the focus of shows about Orthodox Jews." Rindner observed a "dialectical sensibility in his [Malka] show that recalls the religious Zionist visionary Rav Kook much more than it does haredi religious leaders. For every value expressed in Shababnikim, there is a competing or contradictory sentiment articulated at the same time." She also praised the larger role given to Devorah's character in this season and added: "Yet her presence reminds the viewer that the tensions raised by Shababnikim are not exclusive to the ultra-Orthodox. The challenges faced by the new haredim resemble challenges faced by other Orthodox communities, both within Israel and in the diaspora."

Skinazi also wrote about the series for The Forward: "The show will also encourage secular viewers to rethink their attitudes toward Haredim." She concludes: "As Dvora, the wisest character of the show, responds to Gedalia’s grievance that all that they do is argue: “If there were no arguments, you’d have no Mishnah. You’d have no Gemara. You’d have nothing…Everything you study in your yeshiva is about people who clash but still stay together.” Which is a good way to view the culture war between the secular and religious that is dramatized in this series–a push-and-pull way of life that is rooted in Judaism itself."

=== Season 3 ===
In 2025, the third season was praised by Mike Hale in The New York Times: "In the show’s third and final season, which arrives four years after its second, the mix of sentiment and satire is still pleasantly disarming (the season was written and directed by Eliran Malka) and the performances are still uniformly strong, especially among the older supporting actors who play rabbis, matchmakers and overbearing fathers."

== See also ==
- The Chosen (1981)
