= Bar minan =

Sephardic Jewish saying

Bar Minan (Hebrew - בר מינן Hebrew pronunciation: [ˈbar miˈnan]) is a Sephardic Jewish saying which literally translates to "far from us" or "except us." This expression is used when referring to a certain mishap or calamity which one is discussing that he wishes not to befall on himself. One could say, for example, "a man whose children died, bar minan, is exempt."

The first time the term appears in any text is in the Shut (responsa) of Gershom ben Judah about how a person should act if he becomes a mourner on Purim, Bar Minan. It is also used by Asher ben Jehiel and various other rishonim such as David ben Solomon ibn Abi Zimra, Isaac ben Sheshet, Yom Tov Asevilli (Shut), Nissim of Gerona (Shut), Yosef Albo, and the Shibbole ha-Leḳeṭ.

It is also appropriate to use this expression when referring to a certain person, place or thing which is considered bad or wrong in Judaism. Or, one may refer to an inappropriate place as a "Bar Minan" place.
