= Yossi Yona =

Israeli academic and politician

- יוסי יונה
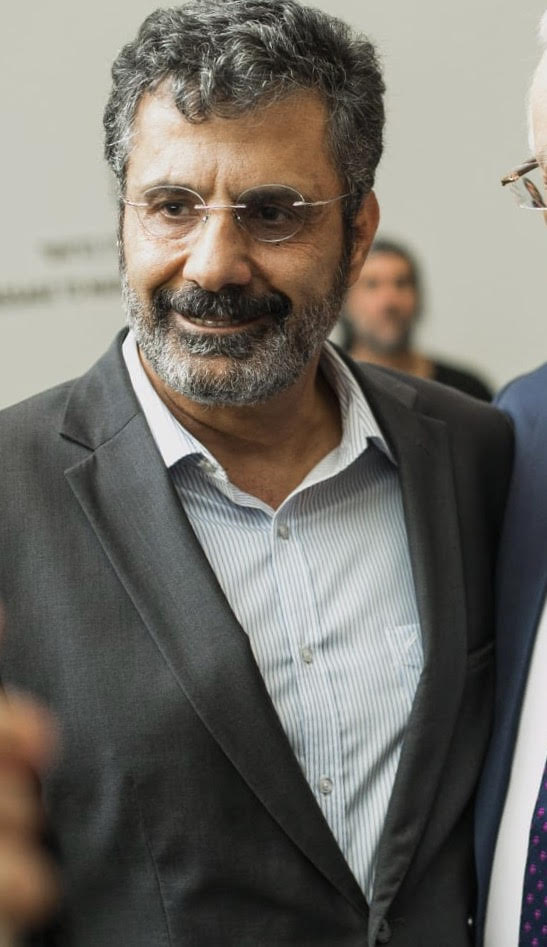

Faction represented in the Knesset
- 2015–2019: Zionist Union
- 2019: Labor Party

Personal details
- Born: 8 June 1953 (age 72); Kiryat Ata, Israel

Yosef "Yossi" Yona (Hebrew: יוסף "יוסי" יונה; born 8 June 1953) is an Israeli academic and politician. He served as a member of the Knesset for the Labor Party between 2015 and 2019.

== Biography ==
Yona was born in the ma'abara of Kiryat Ata. His parents Salman and Sabrina had immigrated from Iraq and he was one of six children. He attended the Nahum Sokolow high school in Kiryat Ata. In 1971 he started his IDF national service and fought in Sinai during the Yom Kippur War.

After leaving the army in 1974, he obtained a Bagrut matriculation certificate and attended the University of Haifa, studying philosophy, history and art. Whilst at university he joined the Left Camp of Israel party. After graduating in 1979, he began studying for a PhD, graduating from the University of Pennsylvania in Philadelphia. He subsequently joined the Education Department at Ben-Gurion University of the Negev. He went on to become a Professor of philosophy of education at Ben-Gurion University, and a senior research fellow at the Van Leer Jerusalem Institute. He was amongst the founders of the Mizrahi Democratic Rainbow Coalition, and one of the leaders of the Geneva Initiative.

In 2012 he joined the Labor Party, and was placed 20th on the party's list for the 2013 Knesset elections. However, the party won only 15 seats and he did not become a Knesset member. He was placed 23rd on the Zionist Union list (an alliance of Labor and Hatnuah) for the 2015 Knesset elections, and was elected to the Knesset as the alliance won 24 seats. He did not contest the April 2019 elections.

After leaving the Knesset, he published three books; two novels and a non-fiction book about politics in art. One of the novels was translated into English and was published in 2021 under the title Tel Aviv Ramallah.
