= Shababnik =

A "shababnik" (Hebrew: שבבניק) is a term for a young Haredi person who leaves his or her faith in some regards but not in others. Shababnikim don't leave the religious community, but bend the boundaries of what is acceptable behavior in Jewish law. The name comes from the Arabic word shabāb (Arabic: شَبَاب) meaning "youth" and the Yiddish suffix -nik (ניק).

== See also ==
- Shababnikim TV series
