= Mizrahi Democratic Rainbow Coalition =

Israeli social justice organization

The Mizrahi Democratic Rainbow Coalition (Hebrew: הקשת הדמוקרטית המזרחית, romanized: HaKeshet HaDemocratit HaMizrahit) is a social justice organization among Mizrahi Jews (Jews from Arab and Muslim lands and the East) in Israel.

== Overview ==
The organization describes itself as a "non-parliamentary, a-political social movement" aiming to influence public discourse in Israel by promoting values such as democracy, human rights, social justice, equality, and multiculturalism. It further defines itself as "Mizrahi in its goals, universal in its beliefs, and open to all who identify with its values." HaKeshet was founded in 1996 by a group of scholars, artists, and activists, including Prof. Yehouda Shenhav, Dr. Ishak Saporta, Dr. Yossi Dahan, Dr. Vicki Shiran, Dr. Henriette Dahan Kalev, Dr. Dolly Benhabib, Shosh Gabay, Prof. Yossi Yona, Hanna Azoulay Hasfari, and Dr. Sami Shalom Chetrit.

HaKeshet engages in both grassroots activism and policy work focused on social and economic justice. Its areas of activity include civil equality for Mizrahim, public housing rights, equitable land distribution, women's rights, cross-cultural dialogue between Jews and Arabs, and the promotion of Mizrahi culture.

In the late 1990s, the organization played a central role in advancing public housing legislation, including the 1998 Public Housing Law and related tenant rights laws and regulations, which enabled many low-income families to purchase their homes. In 2002, it won a landmark case in the Israeli Supreme Court regarding social housing rights, setting a precedent in distributive justice. That same year, the Court ruled in its favor in a case against the Israel Lands Administration concerning land use policy. In 2003, HaKeshet joined a High Court petition aimed at limiting rezoning practices that favored private developers. The organization has also contributed to public discourse through academic publications and community-based educational initiatives.

== See also ==
- Rainbow Coalition (disambiguation)
- Black Panthers (Israel)
