= Yossi Dahan =

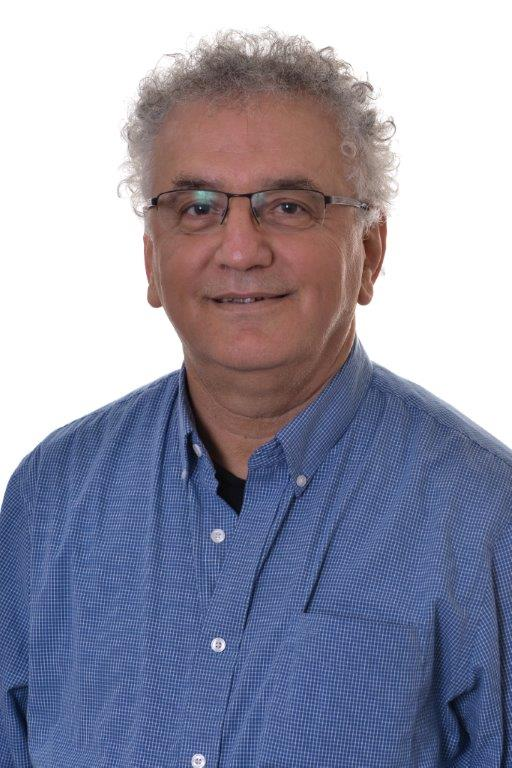
Yossi Dahan

Yossi Dahan (Hebrew: יוסי דהאן; born 1954) is a law professor and the Head of the Human Rights Division at the College of Law and Business. He is the chairperson and cofounder of Adva Center, an editor and cofounder of Haokets.org, and teaches philosophy at the Open University. Dahan is an expert in labor law, workers' rights and global justice, theories of social justice, the right to education and educational justice.

== Biography ==
Yossi Dahan was born in Morocco and immigrated to Israel in 1960. His family lived at first at the Beit Shemesh transition camp (ma'abara) and later at the Bat Yam transition camp, from which it moved to Holon where he graduated from the Kugel High School.

Dahan studied for a BA in philosophy and psychology at Tel Aviv University. In 1976-1979, he moved to the United States to continue his studies and completed his PhD studies at New York City's Columbia University. His PhD thesis was titled "Political Equality in Democratic Theories", supervised by Thomas Pogge and Sidney Morgenbesser. Dahan received his law degree in 1999 at the College of Management Academic Studies (COMAS) in Rishon LeZion, Israel.

Dahan is an associate professor at the Department of Law at the College of Law and Business, where he is also Head of the Human Rights Division. He is also Philosophy and Political Science Teaching Coordinator at the Open University.

In 2006 Dahan was a research associate at Oxford University’s Centre for the Study of Social Justice, and in 2011-2012, he was a visiting scholar at New York University’s Taub Center for Israel Studies.

Dahan cofounded Adva Center for Information on Equality and Social Justice in Israel and has been its acting chair ever since. In 2003, together with Dr. Yitzhak Saporta, he founded the Haokets website – a critical platform on socioeconomic, political, media, cultural and other issues, and has been editing and writing in it ever since. Dahan has acted as a public representative of workers at the National Labor Court.

Since 2003, he has been a member of the editorial board of Van Leer Jerusalem Institute’s Theory and Criticism journal. In 2005-2009, Dahan chaired Van Leer’s research groups on Class and Identity. He is a board member in the Association of Environmental Justice in Israel, and a member of the general assembly and board of the College of Law and Business.

In 1992-1996, Dahan served as a member of the academic team consulting Minister of Labor and Social Welfare Ora Namir. In July 1989, he was a member of the Mizrahi delegation for the Toledo Meeting for Israeli-Palestinian Dialogue, and later of the delegation for the negotiations with the PLO in Stockholm in 1990.

In 1992-1993, together with Professor Yossi Yonah, Yitzhak Shapira and Yael Fishbein, Dahan headed the education team of the Special Committee for Social Development in Yitzhak Rabin’s Prime Minister’s Office. He cofounded the Forum for Social Justice and Peace which operated in the late 1980s and early 1990s under the auspices of the International Center for Peace. The Forum held training programs for community leaders for mixed populations: Arabs and Jews, residents of cities and development towns, new immigrants and long-time residents. As part of his activities at the Forum, Dahan and Professor Yossi Yonah headed the academic steering committee of its training programs. Dahan cofounded the Mizrahi Democratic Rainbow Coalition. Dahan had opinion columns in the Hadashot and Yediot Ahronot daily newspapers.

Yossi is married to Miri, a graphic designer, and has three children: Ayelet, Nili and Noam.

Dahan’s book Theories of Social Justice was first published in Hebrew by the Ministry of Defense Publications in 2007. The book provides an extensive and critical review of major contemporary social justice theories (John Rawls’s theory of justice, libertarianism, Amartya K. Sen’s and Martha Nussbaum’s capability approach, desert theories of justice, Michael Walzer’s theory of justice, global justice, justice and feminism, and justice and multiculturalism). An updated, extended edition of the book, with a new chapter on justice and democracy, was published in Hebrew by the Open University in 2013.

Dahan wrote the postscript to the Hebrew translation of Rawls’s 1985 Justice as Fairness, published in 2011 by Books in the Attic and Miskal.

Since 2008, Dahan is involved in a series of studies on workers' rights in international labor law in collaboration with Dr. Hanna Lerner of the Tel Aviv University Department of Political Science and Dr. Faina Milman-Sivan of the Haifa University Department of Law. This normative and empirical research project develops a theory of shared responsibility and principles of responsibility allocation designed to justify the protection of workers' rights in global chains of productions controlled by multinational corporations. The project is funded by the Israeli Science Fund (ISF). Hitherto, it has led to the publication of several articles in legal and philosophical journal. In early 2015, a collection of articles edited by the researchers will be published by Cambridge University Press under the title International Labor Rights and Global Justice. In 2009, together with Dr. Milman-Sivan, Dahan also edited a special edition the Law & Ethics of Human Rights journal, titled “Labor Rights in an Era of Globalization”.

In the course of his studies on education, Dahan published a series of articles on equal opportunities and privatization in Israeli and international journals. Among other things, he published several articles together with Professor Yossi Yonah of Ben Gurion University in the Negev describing and critiquing ideological and normative aspects of the neoliberal reforms carried out since the 1980s in education systems in Israel and many other countries.

In 2018 Dahan published the book 'On Educational Justice, Privatization, and the Aims of Education' the book was published by Van Leer institute and Hakibuoz Hameuchad. The book examines from a normative and empirical perspective different approaches to educational justice, different conceptions of privatization and their policy applications, and reviews different approaches to the questions of what should be the aims of an educational system in a democratic society.

Finally, together with Professor Henry Wasserman, Dahan edited To Invent a Nation – a collection of articles on modern theories of nationality. The book was published in Hebrew in 2006 by the Open University as part of a series in the course Issues in the Study of Nationalism, together with Hebrew translations of Benedict Anderson’s Imagined Communities, Ernst Gellner’s Nations and Nationalism, and Partha Chatterjee’s Nationalist Thought and the Colonial World: A Derivative Discourse.

== Books ==
On Educational Justice, Privatization, and the Aims of Education. This book was published in Hebrew by Van Leer institute and Hakibuoz Hameuchad in 2018.

=== Theories of Social Justice ===
This book was published in Hebrew by the Ministry of Defense Publications in 2007. An updated, extended edition of the book, with a new chapter on justice and democracy, was published in Hebrew by the Open University in 2013. This book is a key text in the university’s Contemporary Socioeconomic Justice Theories course.

- Hebrew review of the book by Dr. Shlomi Segal in Iyyun: The Jerusalem Philosophical Quarterly.
- Hebrew review of the book by Justice Dr. Avraham Tenenbaum in HaMishpat: Law Review, The College of Management Law School.

=== To Invent a Nation ===
A collection of articles on modern theories of nationality coedited with Professor Henry Wasserman; published in Hebrew in 2006 by the Open University.

- “Nationality as conspiracy, or is the US an ideal model a nation?”, Review article in Haaretz, March 3, 2007.
- “The people of Israel? Come again?”, Review article in Makor Rishon, March 9, 2007.

== Other Publications about Social Justice ==
- The postscript to the Hebrew translation of Rawls’s 1985 Justice as Fairness, published in 2011 by Books in the Attic and Miskal.

== Selected Edited Publications ==
- Coeditor of a special edition on workers’ rights in the era of globalization in Law & Ethics of Human Rights, with Faina Milman-Sivan.
- Guest editor of a special edition on education in the Alpayim literary journal, 2010.

== Article on Land and Distributive Justice ==
- “Who Owns This Land? On Rights and Conceptions of Social Justice”, Mishpat uMimshal (Law & Government), 8(223), 2005.

== A Book and a Selection of Articles on Workers' Rights and Global Justice ==
- Co-editor of Global Justice and International Labor Rights (with Hanna Lerner and Faina Milman Sivan, Cambridge University Press, forthcoming, 2015).
- Yossi Dahan, Hanna Lerner and Faina Milman Sivan, "Duties of Labor as Duties of Justice", Journal of Social Philosophy, forthcoming, 2015.
- Yossi Dahan, Hanna Lerner and Faina Milman Sivan, “Shared Responsibility and the International Labor Organization,” Michigan Journal of International Law, Vol. 34 (2013), pp. 675–743.
- Dahan, Y. Lerner, H. Milman, F. "Global Justice, Responsibility and International Labor Standards", Theoretical Inquires in Law, Vol. 11 No. 3, 2011.
- Dahan, Y., Lerner, H. Milman, F. "International Labor Standards", Encyclopedia of Global Justice, Springer, 2011.

== Selected Articles on Education ==
- Dahan, Y. (2010) Privatization, Marketization and Equality of Educational Opportunity, Journal of Law & Ethics of Human Rights, Vol. 4.
- Dahan, Y. Hammer Y. 2010., "Democracy, the Educational Autonomy of Cultural Minorities and the Law: The Case of the Ultra-Orthodox Minority in Israel" in Alexander, H., Pinson, H., and Yonah, Y. (2009) Citizenship, Education and Social Conflict, London: Routledge.
- Dahan, Y. Levy, G. (2000) "The Multicultural Education in the Zionist State – The Mizrahi Challenge" Studies in Philosophy and Education 19: (5-6): 423-444.
- Yonah, Y., Dahan, Y. and D. Markovich. 2008. "Neo-liberal Reforms in Israel's Education System: the Dialectics of the State," International Studies in Sociology of Education 18(4): 199-216. Dahan, Y. Yonah, Y. (2007) "Israel's Education System: Equality of Opportunity: from Nation Building to Neo Liberalism" in Brock, C. and Levers, L. (eds) Aspects of Education in the Middle East and North Africa. Oxford University Press.
- Yonah, Y, Dahan, Y. (2008) "Neo Liberal Reforms in Israel's Education System", in Resnik, J. (ed.) The Production of Educational Knowledge in the Global Era, Sense Publishers. (121-145).

== Articles and Publications in Other Subjects ==
- Hebrew translation and annotation of Thomas Nagel’s What Does It All Mean: A Very Short Introduction to Philosophy, Papyrus, Tel Aviv University, 1994.
