= Independence Park (Tel Aviv) =

Park in Tel Aviv, Israel

- גן העצמאות
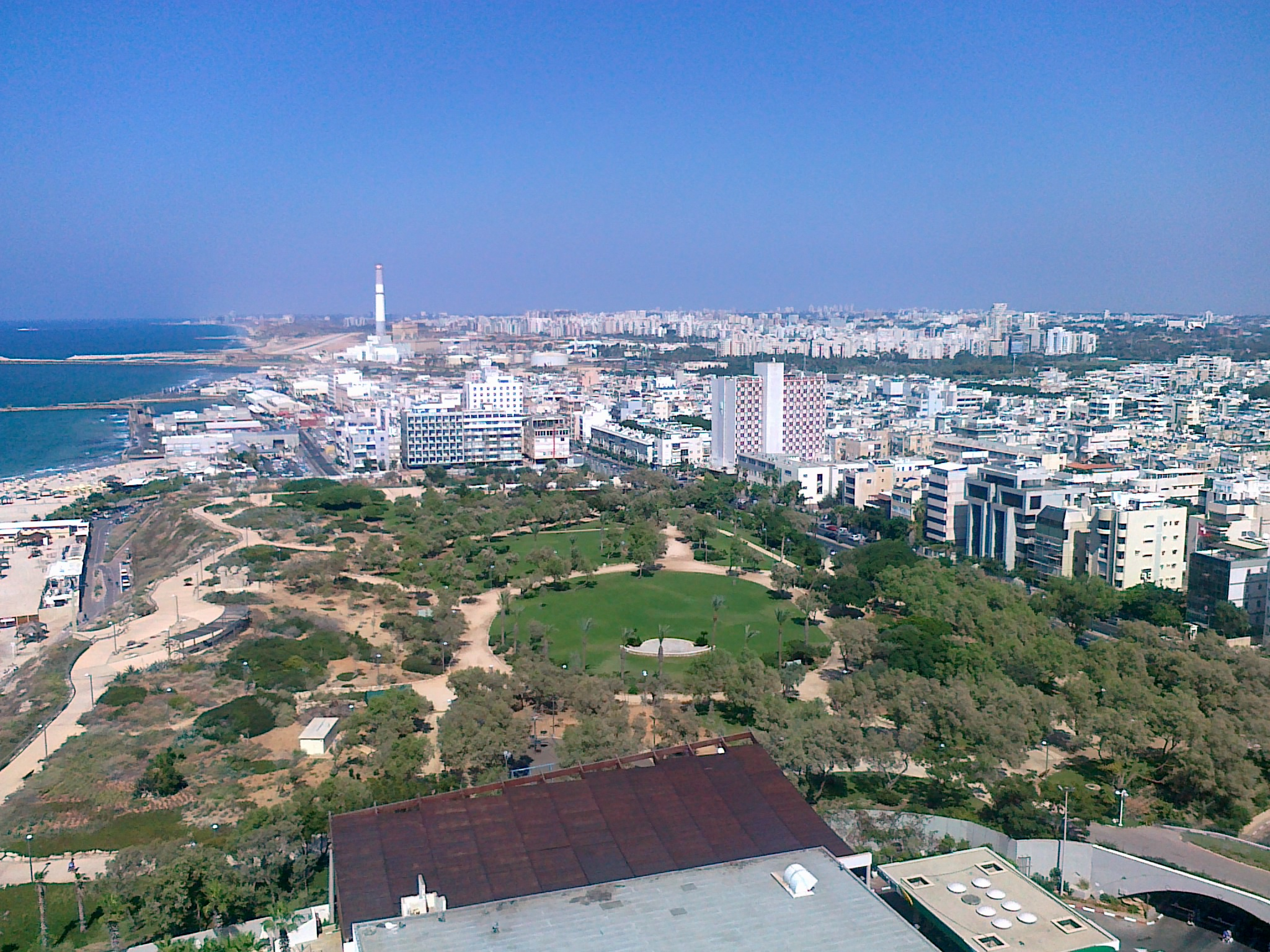
- Interactive map of Independence Park
- Type: Urban park
- Location: Tel Aviv, Israel
- Coordinates: 32°05′30″N 34°46′19″E
- Established: 1949, Opened 1952
- Operator: Tel Aviv municipality
- Status: Open all year

Independence Park (Hebrew: גן העצמאות), is a park in Tel Aviv, Israel located along the coast and contains the Hilton Tel Aviv hotel. It was designed by landscape architect Avraham Karavan. In is situated on the western end of Hayarkon Street in the Old North neighborhood. The first trees were planted on Israel's first Independence Day in 1949 and the park was officially inaugurated in 1952. At the time it was the largest park in the city. In 2009, the park was renovated as part of Tel Aviv's centennial anniversary celebrations.

== History ==
Most of the site on which the park now stands was previously a limestone hill. As the park was in development, the remains of a Hasmonean were discovered in the southern section of the land. Therefore, there is reason to believe that Jewish settlement in Tel Aviv began over 2, 000 years ago.

=== Cemetery ===
Since the second half of the 19th century, a Muslim cemetery has been situated on a portion of the land. It served the needs of Arab residents in Jaffa and Al-Mas'udiyya. Following the cholera epidemic that broke out in Jaffa in 1902 and the need to bury the dead far from the city, an official permit was given by the Ottoman authorities for the burial of Muslims on the land. Jewish residents of Jaffa were forbidden from burying their dead near the city and an area was allocated for a Jewish cemetery northeast of Jaffa (later the Trumpeldor Cemetery). As Arab Muslims began to settle in new neighborhoods in the late 1920s, the expansion of the Muslim cemetery southward was halted.

In the early 1960s, the Hilton Hotel chain wanted to build a hotel in Tel Aviv on the park land. The Israeli government was interested in the entry of a major international hotel chain in the country, but the chain refused to build the hotel at any other location in Tel Aviv. In order to build the hotel, it was necessary to evacuate some of the Muslim graves in the area. The Qadi Tawfiq Asaliya granted permission in 1963 to evacuate certain graves in the cemetery area in order to allow the construction of the hotel. The Hilton Tel Aviv was built on an area of 17 dunams in the center of the garden, effectively splitting the garden into two parts. The tomb of Abd al-Nabi and the tombs around it were enclosed by a wall and are located south of the hotel.

=== Military uses ===
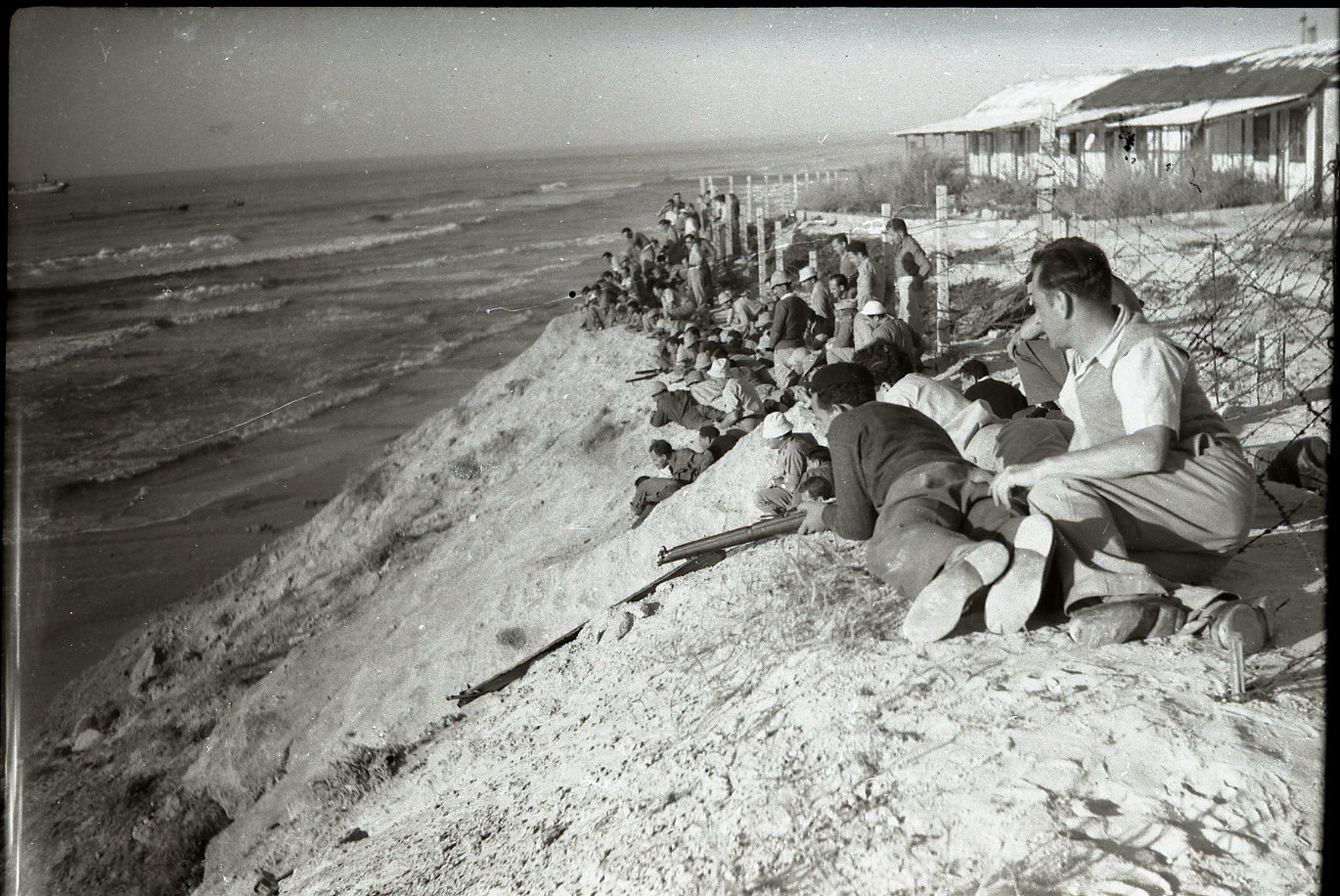
Yona Camp in 1947

In the British Mandate of Palestine era, the British established a small military camp on the land in 1942. It served as a recreation camp for the Royal Air Force. On December 16, 1947, with the British withdrawal from the Dan bloc, the Haganah took over the land. The Kiryatiti Brigade then took command of the camp. During the 1948 Palestine war, it became an Israel Defense Forces base and was named "Yona Camp", after Yona Rasin, a senior Haganah officer who was killed in service at the end of 1947. This base served as the IDF's first absorption and selection base and as a recruitment base. Some of the battalions of the Kiryatiti Brigade were established there. The Irgun ship Altalena was shelled from here in June 1948. The camp was mainly used by the Medical Corps unit. At the conclusion of the war, the medical unit was closed. The base's facilities were then used for urban summer camps.

In the 1950s, the camp became a training base for physical training and combat fitness, as well as a civilian school for training sports coaches and physical education teachers. In 1957, the base and the school were transferred to the Wingate Institute.

The area of the park was already marked in the Geddes Plan for Tel Aviv, the city's first master plan from the late 1920s, as an area intended to be used as a park. The mayor of Tel Aviv, Israel Rokach, aspired to establish a park on the camp grounds, a green lung overlooking the sea. Towards the first Independence Day in 1949, half of the area of the Yona camp was cleared, and in April 1949 the first trees were planted on the grounds.

For four years, the Prime Minister and the Chief of Staff rejected Rokach's requests to evacuate the camp. In 1952, thanks to the addition of the General Zionist Party to the coalition and Rokach's entry into the position of Minister of the Interior, the camp grounds were transferred to the municipality and the camp was subsequently gradually cleared, over a period of about ten years.

=== In popular culture ===
The park features in a number of Modern Hebrew literary works, particularly exploring its reputation when the park was known as a meeting place for cruising for gay men.

It is featured in Yossi Avni-Levy 1995 short story collection, The Garden of Dead Trees. The 2013 film Snails in the Rain by Yariv Mozer is set in 1989 and is an adaptation of a story from Avner-Levy's collection. In the film, the lead character, Boaz (Yoav Reuveni) frequents the park for homosexual encounters. The park also features in this context in Avni-Levy's 2002 novel, Auntie Farhuma Wasn't a Whore After All.

Dory Manor also wrote a poem about the park, titled "In the Garden". Ilan Sheinfeld, a pioneering gay Israeli writer, also regularly mentioned the park in his poetry. In one poem, he writes: "Blessed are you the garden, the protector of all who desire" appears. In his poem "Gan Porah", the park becomes a metaphorical garden representing male love in general, with the pleasure and terror involved in it.

The park is also the location of the Electric Cave in Yigal Mossinson's children's novels series, Hasamba.

Independence Park is mentioned in the song "I Sing" by Arik Einstein and Shalom Hanoch, whose original lyrics were "There is a park in the north of the city, in the north of the city there is a park, whoever criticizes it, breaks his little one".

The park is also indirectly mentioned in the song "With Him Forever" by the band Korach Teshah, whose lyrics contain the line "A friend brings a friend every night to the park," referring to the cruising culture that was popular in the park.

== Landmarks ==
Among the sculptures in the park are two bronze statues of Asa of Judah and Jehoshaphat (2000) by Boaz Vaadia, overlooking the sea. There is also a tall monument, the "Pilots Monument" (1952) by Benjamin Tammuz resembling a bird with a broken wing commemorates Independence War pilots David Sprinzak and Mati Sukenik. In addition, there is "Sculpture in the Garden" (1982), a painted steel sculpture by Dov Feigin.

== Gallery ==
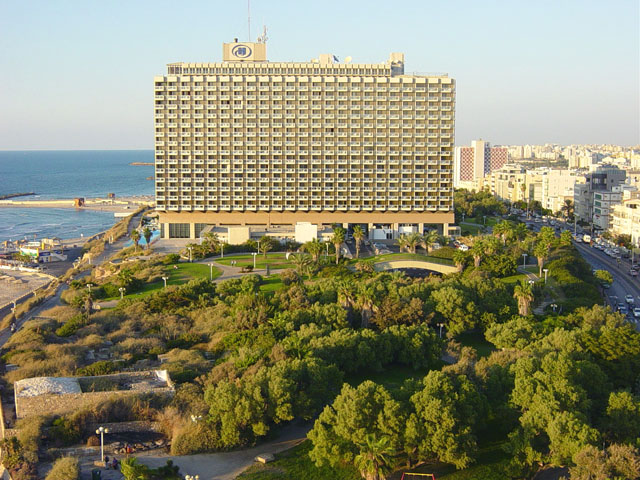
Hilton Tel Aviv

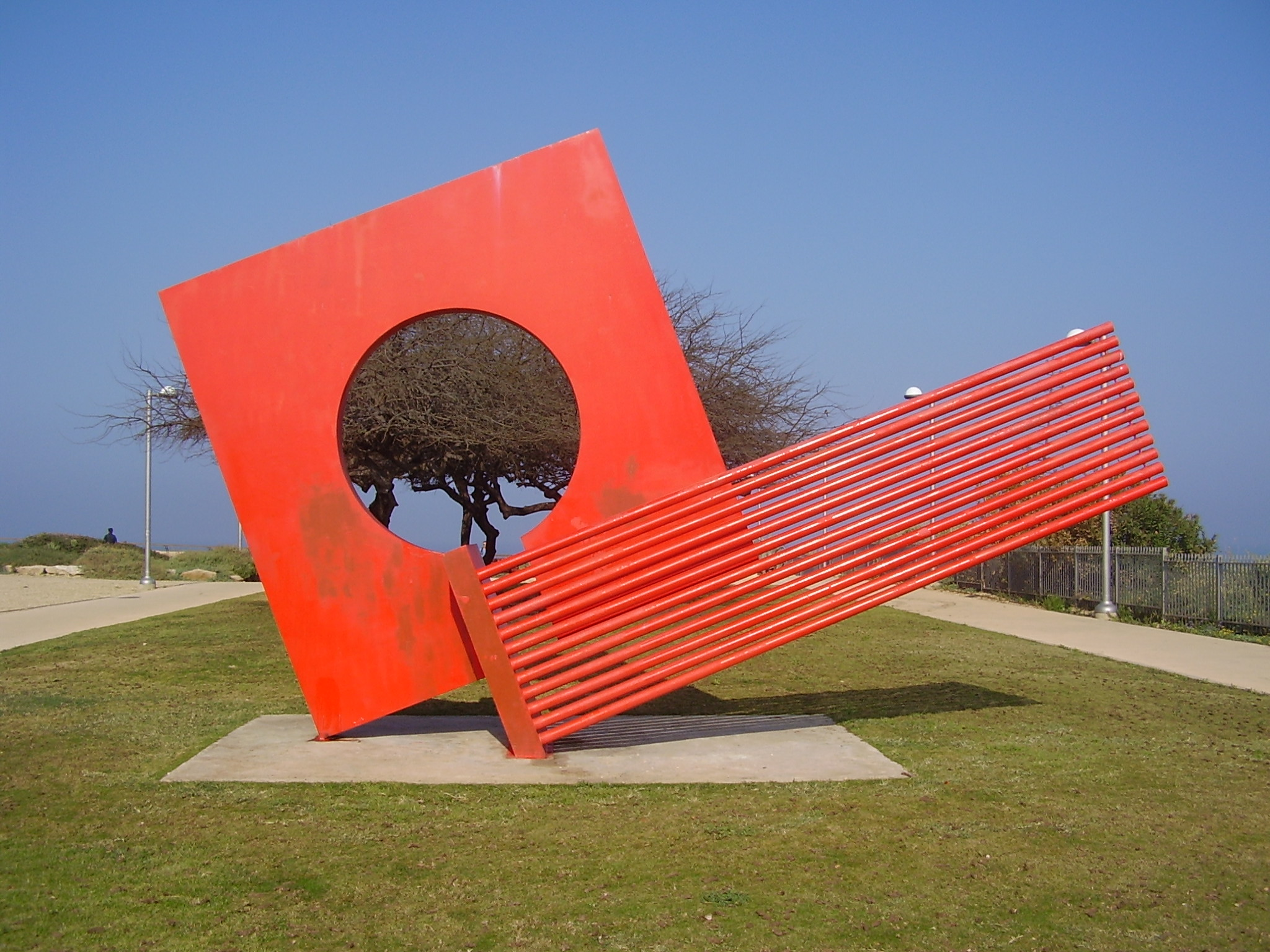
"Sculpture in the Garden" (1982) by Dov Feigin

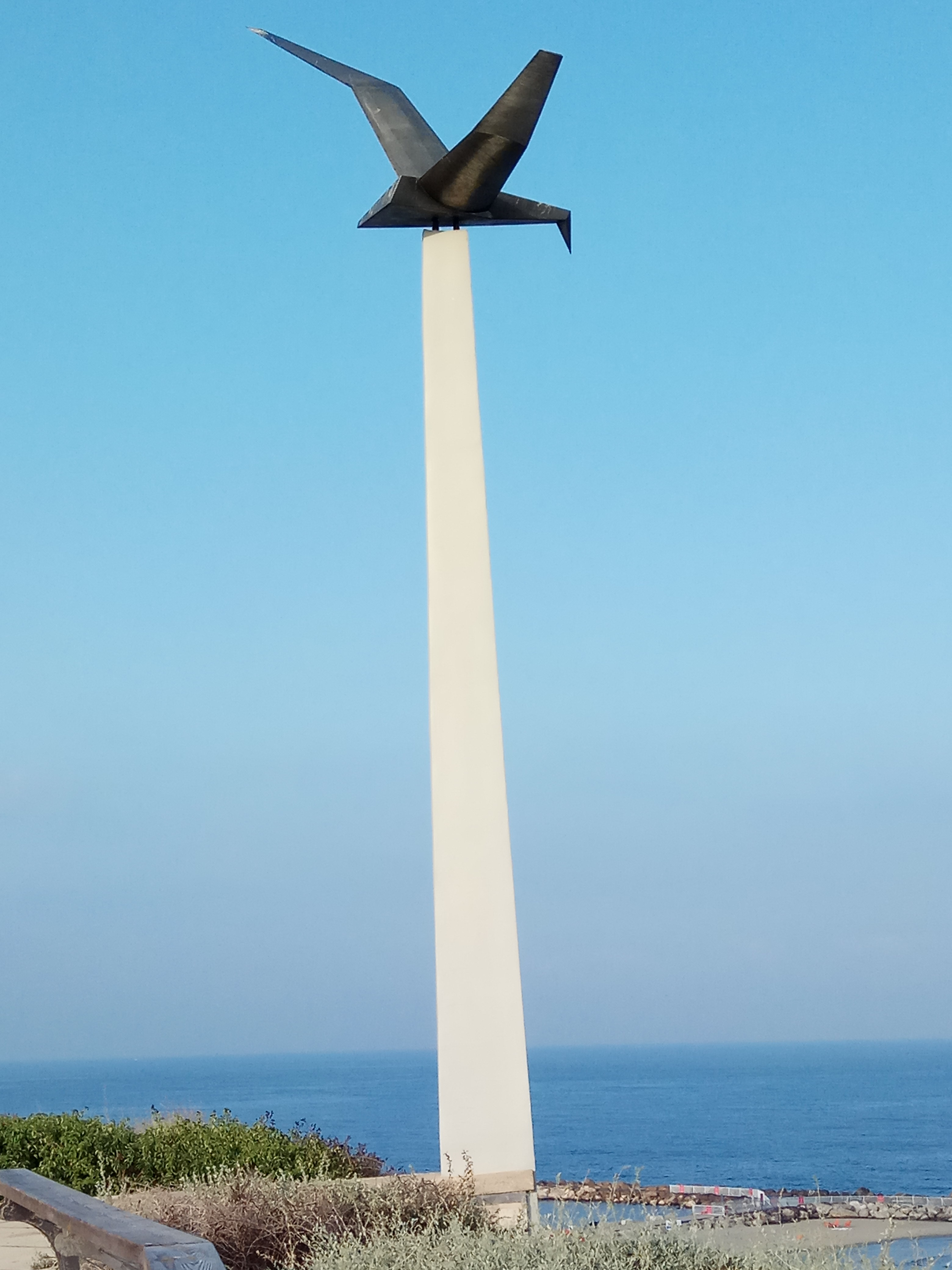
Pilots memorial (1952) by Benjamin Tammuz

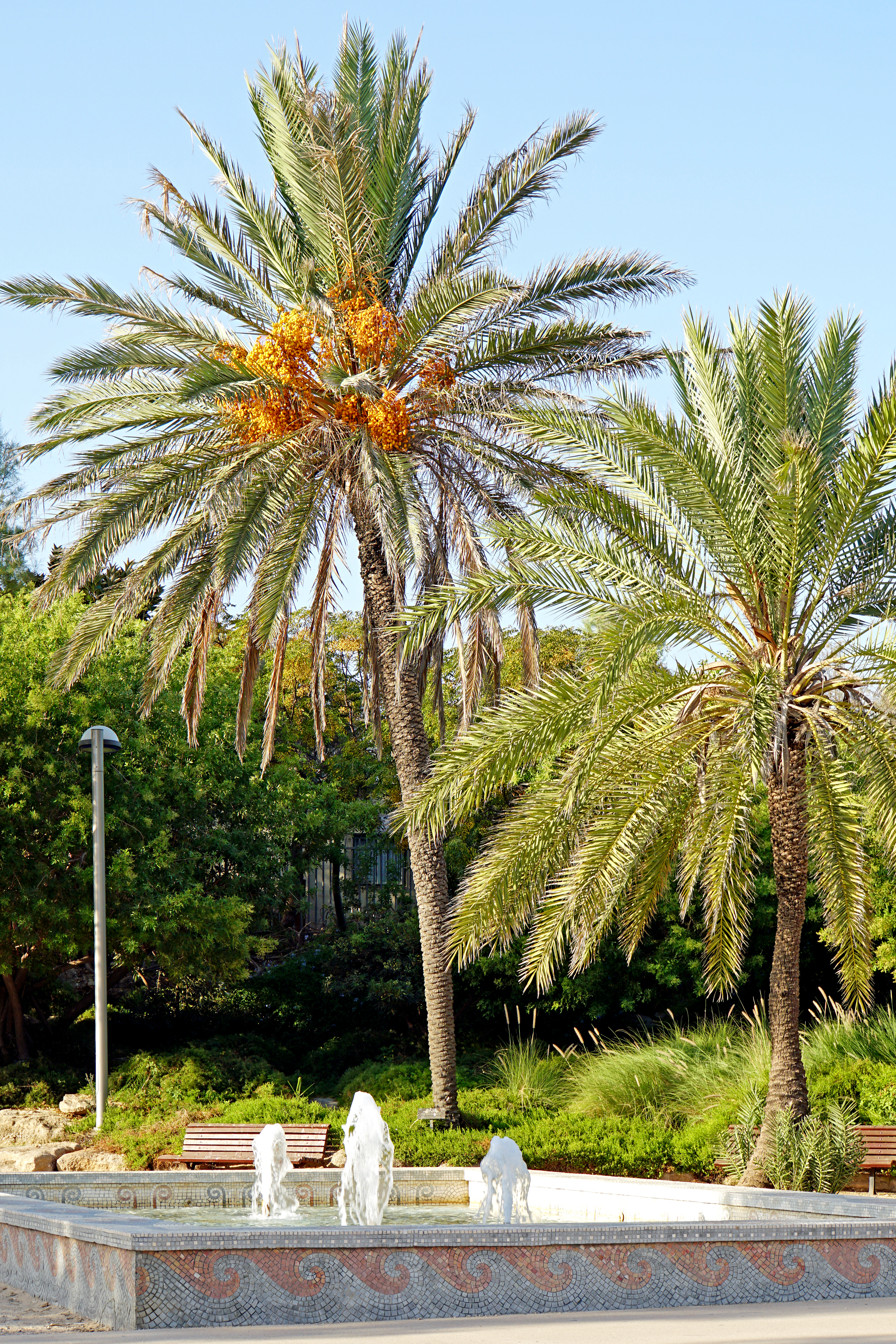
Date palm trees and fountain

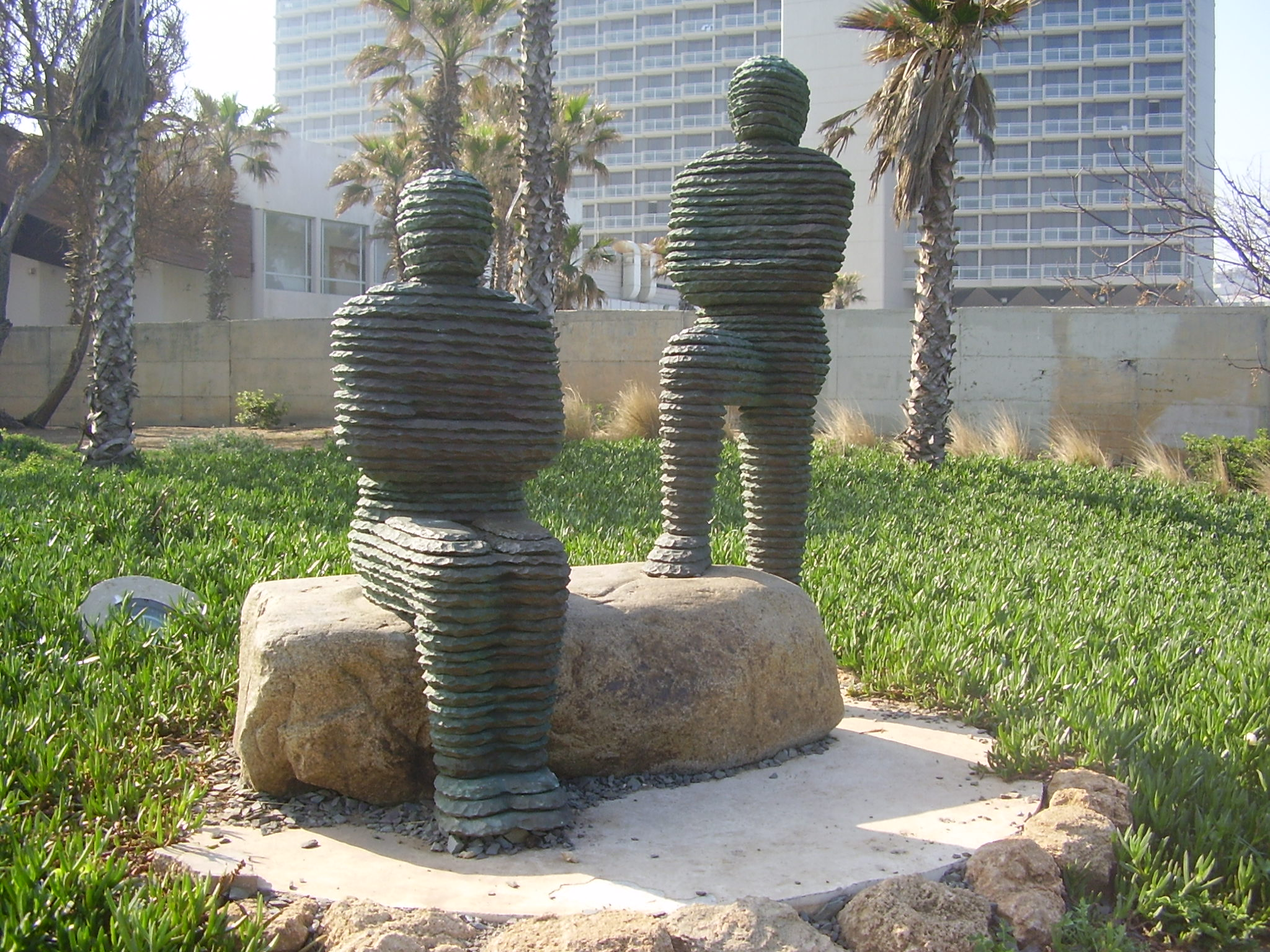
Asa of Judah and Jehoshaphat (2000) by Boaz Vaadia

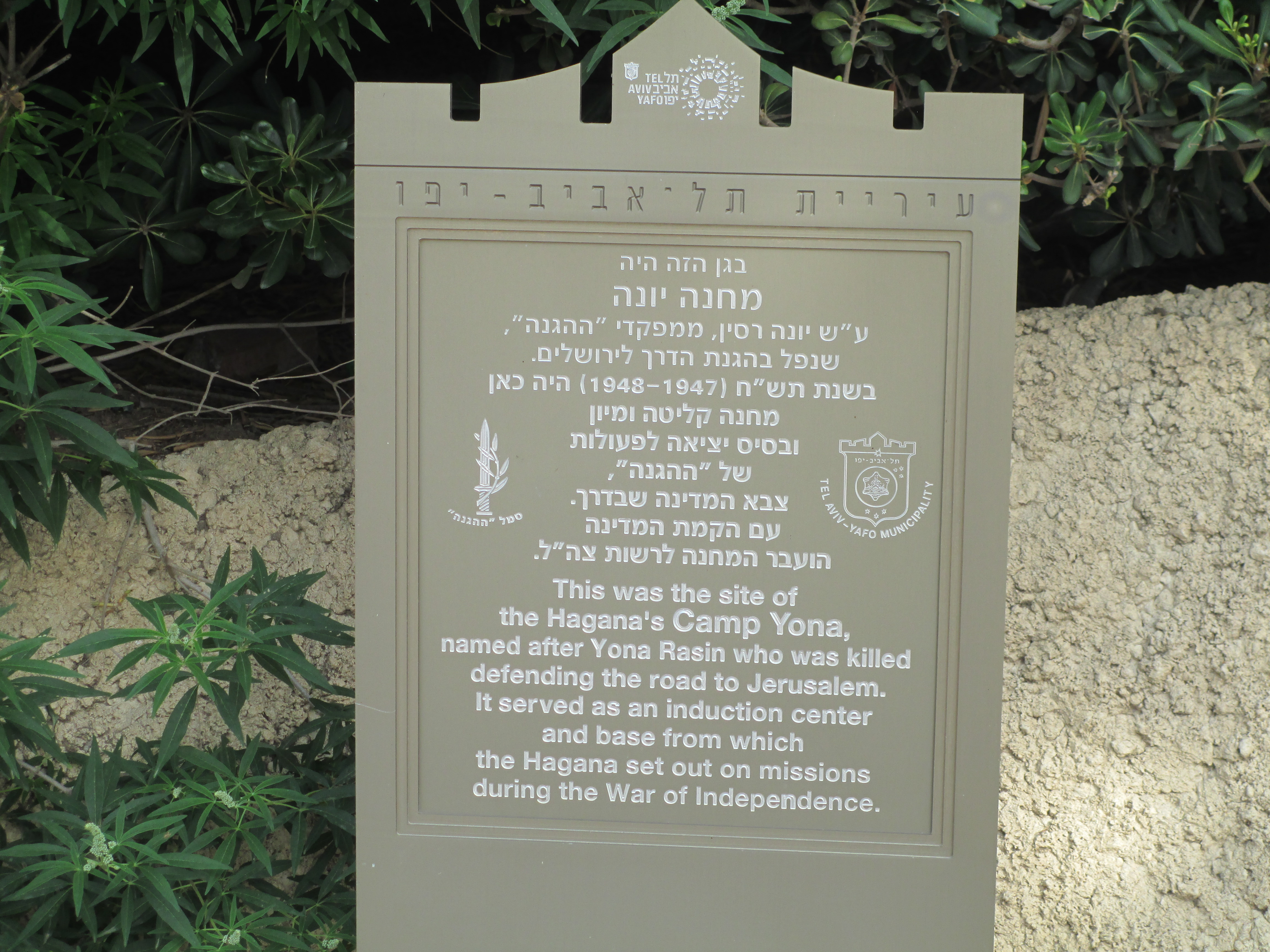
Memorial plaque of Camp Yona

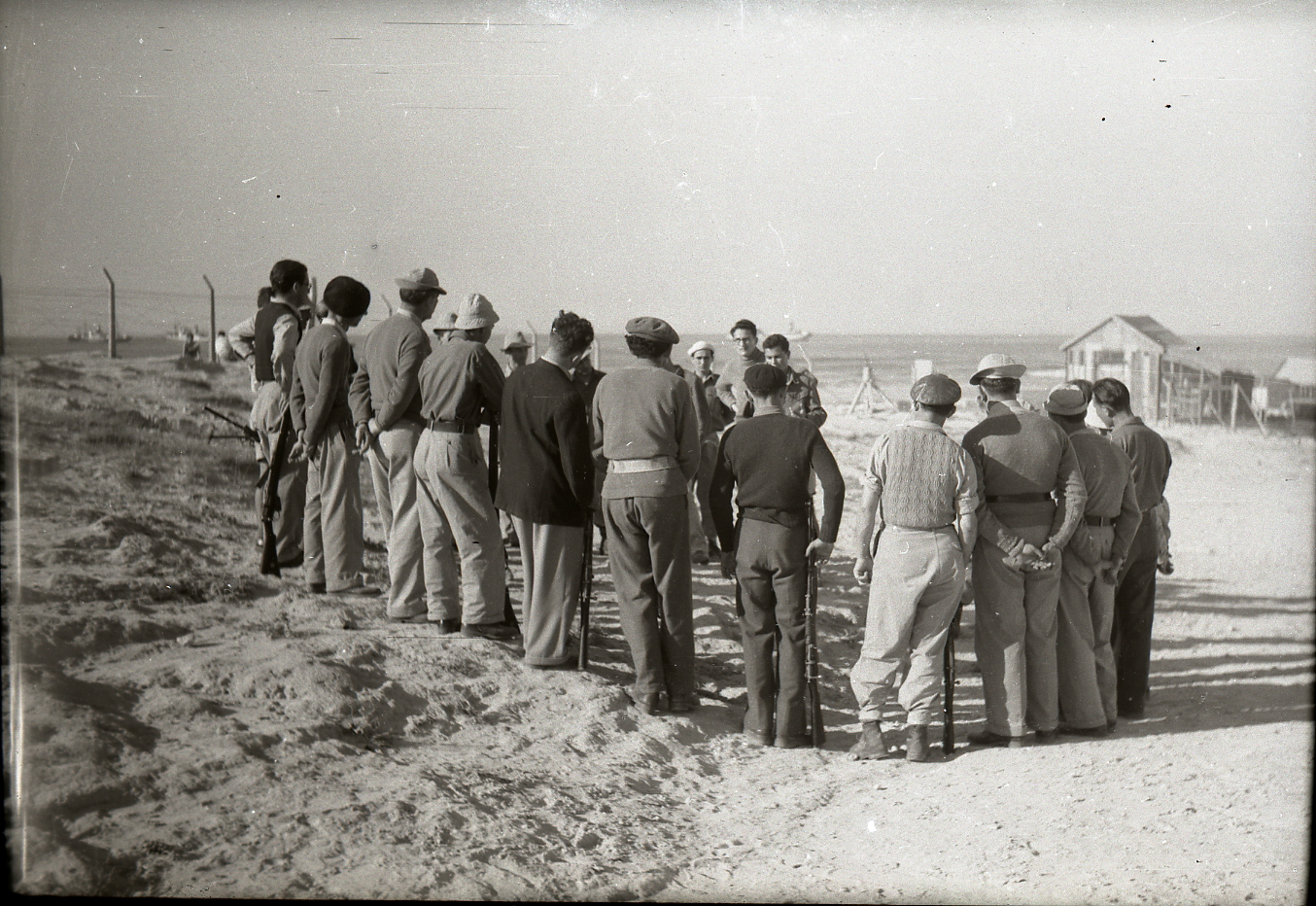
Haganah at Camp Yona in 1947, photo by Beno Rothenberg

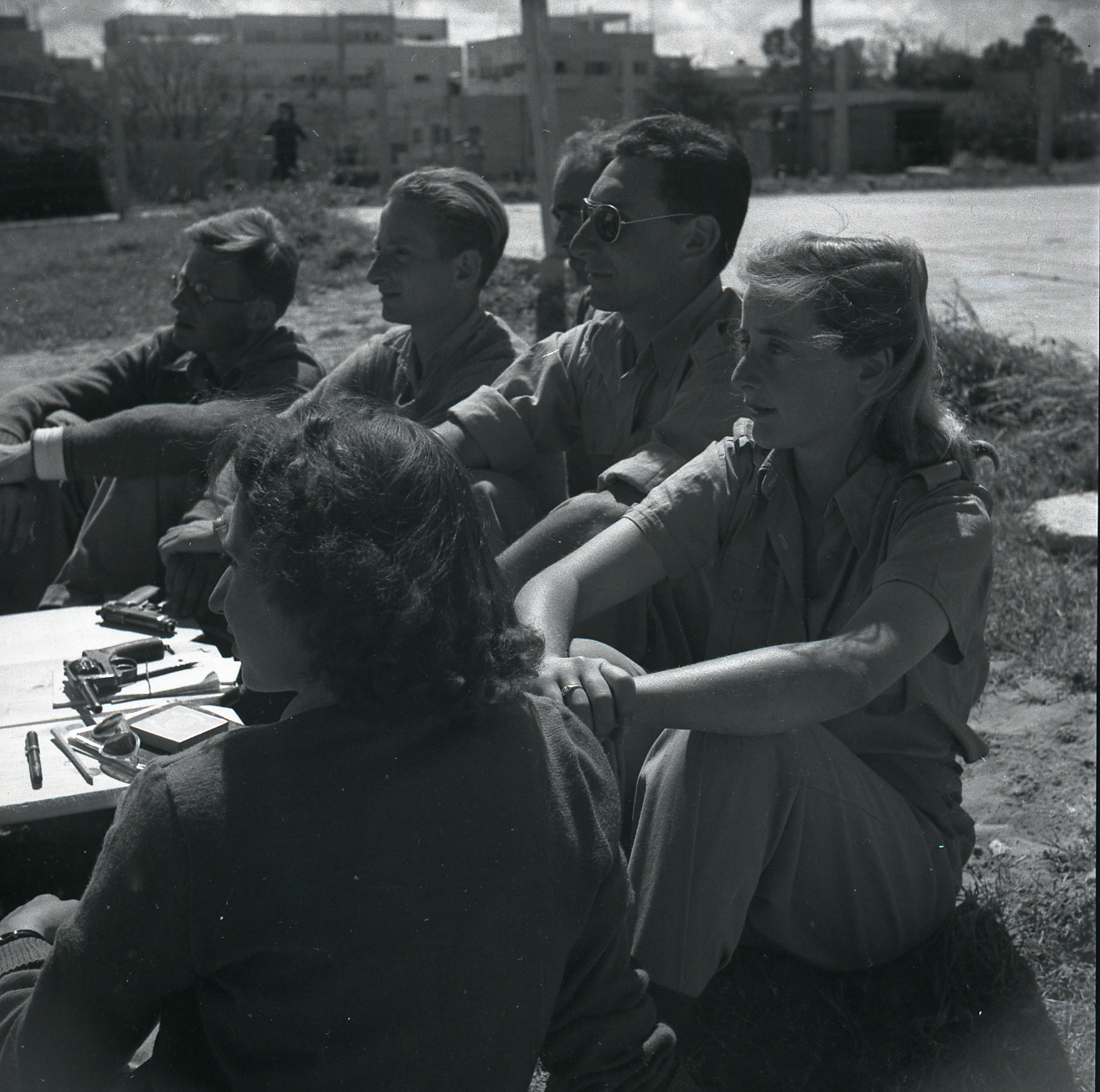
Men and women at Camp Yona in 1947, photo by Boris Carmi

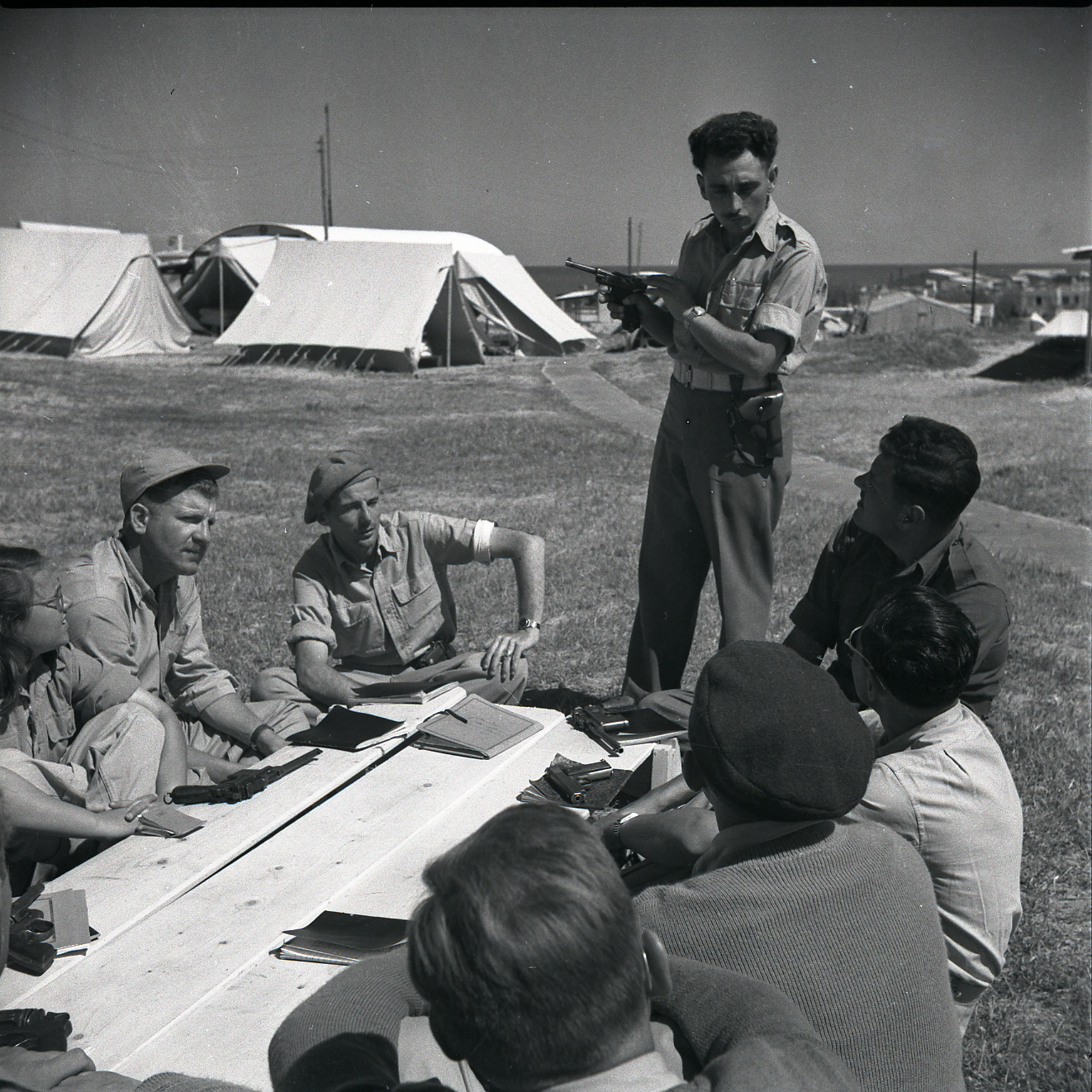
Haganah at Camp Yona in 1947, photo by Boris Carmi

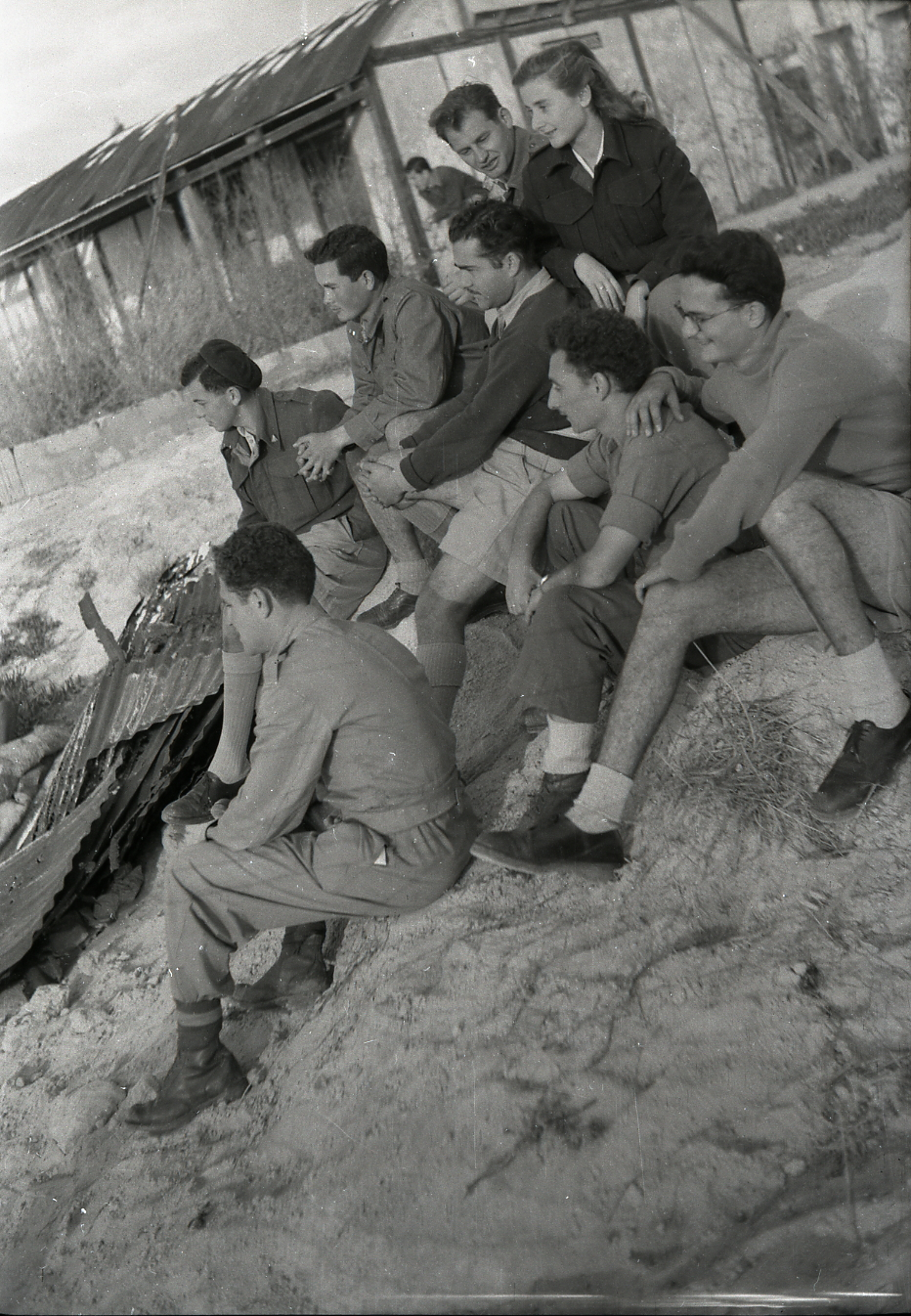
Haganah at Camp Yona in 1947, photo by Beno Rothenberg

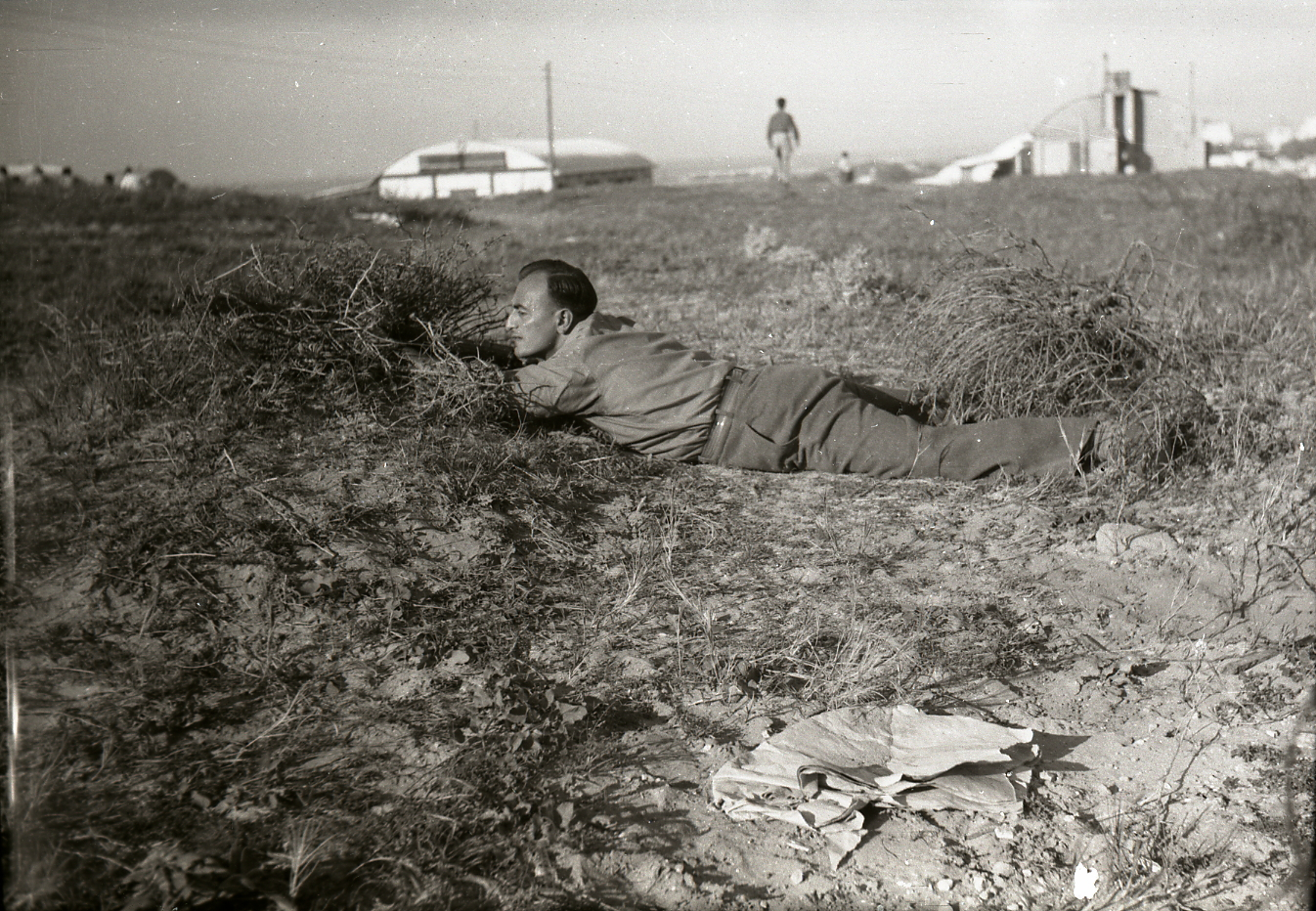
Haganah at Camp Yona in 1947, photo by Beno Rothenberg

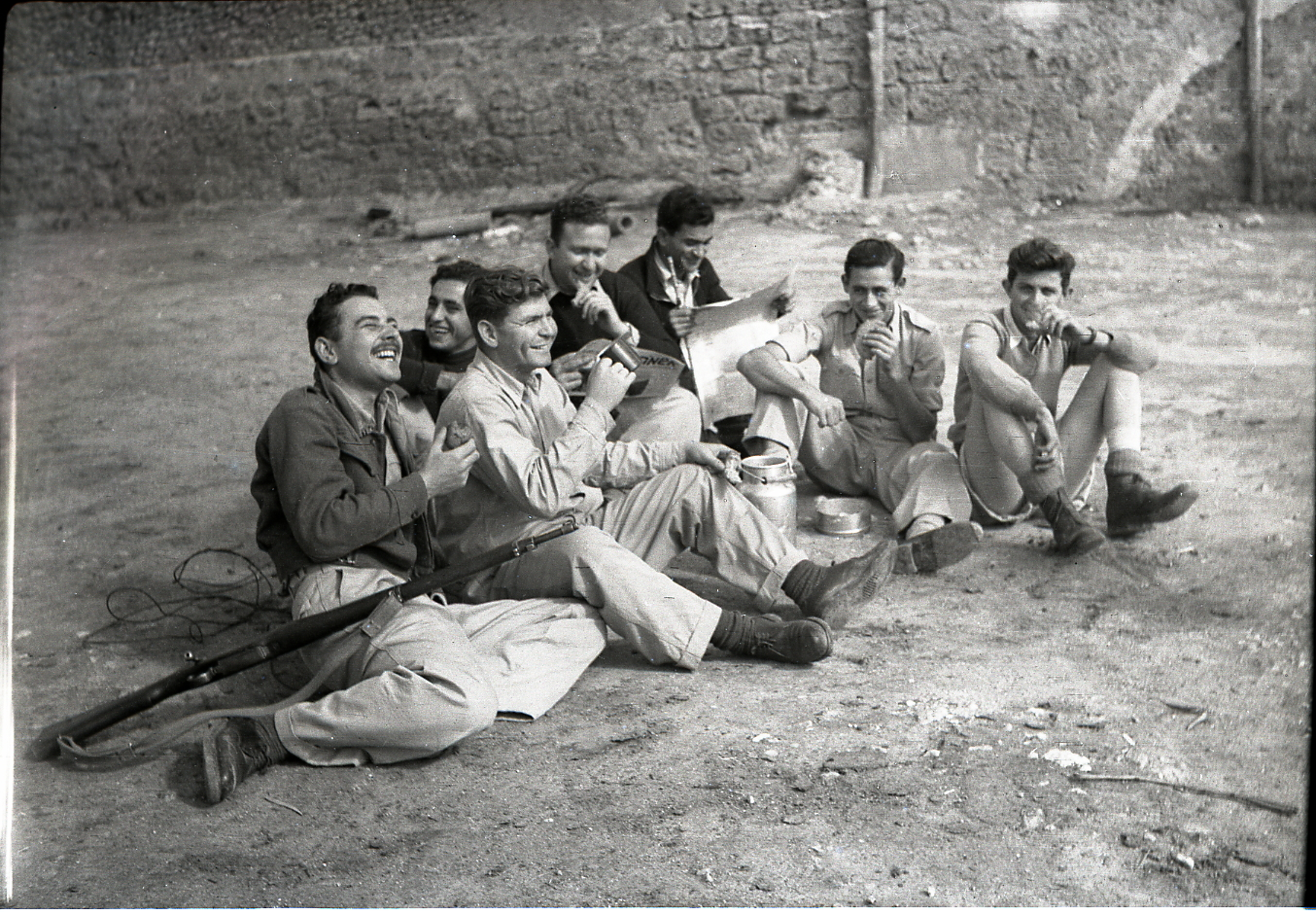
Haganah at Camp Yona in 1947, photo by Beno Rothenberg
