= Yoav Reuveni =

Israeli actor and fashion model (born 1985)

- יואב ראובני
- Born: 25 November 1985 (age 40); Yavne'el, Israel
- Modeling information
- Height: 6 ft 1 in (185 cm)
- Hair color: Brown
- Eye color: Brown
- Agency: Yuli Group; Ford Models (previous)

Yoav Reuveni (Hebrew: יואב ראובני; born 25 November 1985) is an Israeli fashion model and actor. He was signed to Ford Models in 2008 and modeled for fashion houses such as Roberto Cavalli, Giorgio Armani, and Dolce & Gabbana.

In 2013, he played the lead role of Boaz in the Israeli drama film, Snails in the Rain. He won a special Award for Best Actor at TLVFest.

He is currently signed with the Yuli Group, a modeling agency in Tel Aviv.

== Early life ==
He was born in Yavne'el in Israel. His mother had previously made aliyah from Italy. During his mandatory military service with the Israel Defense Forces, he served in the Second Lebanon War. He received the Paratrooper Brigade Commander's Medal for rescuing wounded people under fire in the Paratroopers' Battalion, working as a medic.

== Career ==
=== Modeling ===
After his discharge from the IDF in 2007, he was brought to the Yuli Group, a modeling agency in Tel Aviv by his former model girlfriend, Zvika Finkelstein. Yuli were impressed and decided to sign Reuveni. He modeled for Israeli fashion chains such as Delta Galil and Golf, where he was the face of the brand for four consecutive seasons until 2010.

He also became the first Israeli to appear in a Dolce & Gabbana catalogue. In 2007, he also appeared alongside Gal Gadot in an international campaign for Perry Ellis perfume.

He also worked as a model in South Africa for six months, where he also appeared on the cover of Men's Health magazine.

In 2008, he was signed by Ford Models in Paris and also worked there and in Milan during that period. In the same year he was signed by Premier Model Management in London.

In 2008, he also appeared in a massive nationwide campaign in Israel for optics brand, Optika Einam, with an NIS 4 million budget. Reuveni appeared in newspaper and cataloague ads with model, Yeva Don.

In 2014, he appeared in a fashion campaign with Ninet Tayeb for Delta Galil.

In recent years he has resumed his modeling career, signing again with the Yuli Group.

=== Acting ===
In 2011, he appeared as the love interest in the music video of "Mon meilleur amour" by Indonesian-French singer, Anggun.

In 2011, Reuveni began filming the Israeli drama film, Snails in the Rain. The film is based on a short story taken from the 1995 book, "The Garden of Dead Trees" by Yossi Avni-Levy. Reuveni plays the lead character, Boaz, a linguistics student, whose suppressed same-sex attraction threatens his relationship with his girlfriend, Noa, (Moran Rosenblatt). The film's director, Yariv Mozer, explained his reasons for casting Reuveni: "He's exactly what I was looking for as Boaz - a guy whose beauty knocks both men and women out." Reuveni is heterosexual and had not had any homosexual experiences to draw upon for the film. Therefore, to connect Reuveni with the sexually charged and traumatic atmosphere he was seeking to create, Mozer engaged with Reuveni's experiences as a conscripted soldier in the Israel Defense Forces: "My way of solving this was to return Yoav to the traumatic place he had in his military service in the Second Lebanon War. He was a soldier who experienced situations between life and death...And so Yoav identified and allowed himself to connect with this character of Boaz." The film premiered at TLVFest in 2013, where Reuveni won a special Award for Best Actor.

A year earlier, Reuveni had a minor role as an actor in the comedy film, Single Plus (Revaka plus), directed by Late Marriage director, Dover Kosashvili.

== Personal life ==
Reuveni was previously in a relationship with Israeli TV personality, Liron Weizman. In October 2013, he married Adi Ronen, founder of fashion company, Adika, in Caesarea. The couple's friend, Bar Refaeli, also attended the wedding. They have two sons together, Adam and Yam. The couple divorced in 2021.

He recounted that Domenico Dolce once invited him to a romantic dinner date, but that he politely declined as he is straight.
