= Yariv Mozer =

Israeli film producer, screenwriter and film director (born 1978)

- יריב מוזר
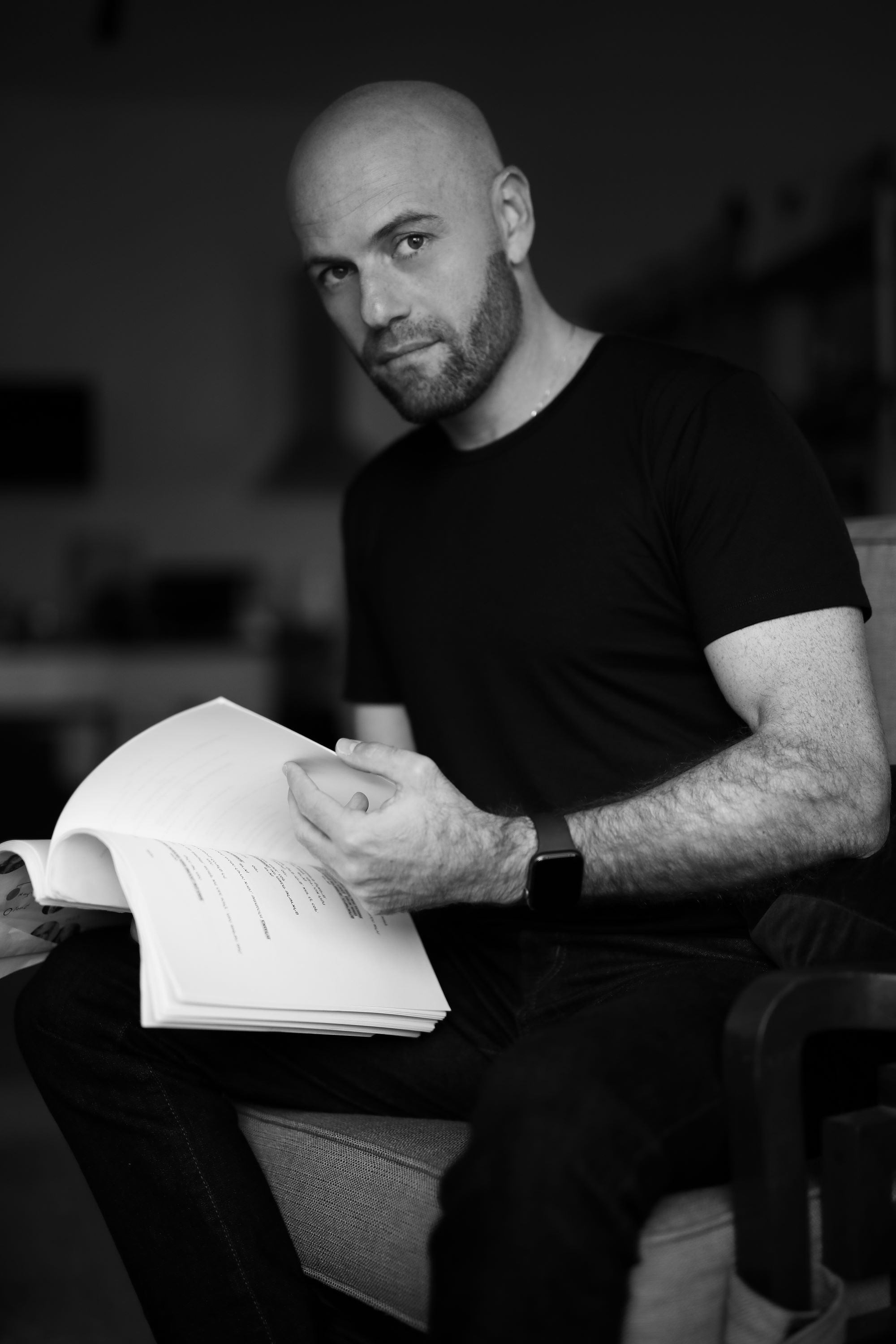
- Born: 17 February 1978 (age 48); Tel Aviv, Israel
- Occupation: Filmmaker
- Political party: Yashar
- Website: mozer-films.com

Yariv Mordechai Mozer (Hebrew: יריב מרדכי מוזר; born 17 February 1978) is an Israeli film producer, screenwriter and film director.

He wrote and directed the 2024 documentary We Will Dance Again about the Nova music festival massacre, winning the News and Documentary Emmy Award for Outstanding Current Affairs Documentary in 2025.

== Biography ==
Mozer was born in Tel Aviv-Yafo and raised in Herzliya. He served in the army as an armament officer in the Artillery Corps. After serving in the Second Lebanon War, he was promoted to the rank of major in the reserves. He graduated with distinction from the Department of Film and Television at Tel Aviv University. Mozer served as director of the 10th Tel Aviv International Student Film Festival (2004) which hosted Richard Gere (USA), Patrice Leconte (France), Catherine Breillat (France), Thomas Vinterberg (Denmark), and Nabil Ayouch (Morocco) in Tel Aviv.

From 2005 to 2007, he was the supervising producer of Alma Films LTd., owned by Israeli producer Arik Bernstein. He supervised the productions of “Tik Lo Sagur” (2005) directed by Naftali Gliksberg, "5250" (2005) directed by Uri Bar-On, "Hot House" (2006) directed by Shimon Dotan, recipient of a special Jury mention at the 2007 Sundance Film Festival, and the television series "Six Days in June" (2007) directed by Ilan Ziv. Between 2007 and 2011 he headed the Entrepreneur Production Studies at the Jerusalem Sam Spiegel Film School.

In 2006, he founded Mozer Films Ltd a film and television production company. In 2008 he premiered his first documentary film as a director, My First War, depicting his personal experience at the 2nd Lebanon War, which was premiered at the IDFA 2008 and won the 2008 DocAviv Special Jury Award and the 2009 Toronto Jewish Film Festival Best Documentary Award. In 2009, he directed the documentary film There Must Be Another Way following the Israeli representatives at the 2009 Eurovision Song Contest, singers Noa and Mira Awad. In 2010. he was the first Israeli to be accepted into EAVE Producers workshop. In 2012, he directed the documentary "The Invisible Men" on persecuted gay Palestinian, which received an honourable mention at Docaviv Film Festival and the Outstanding Documentary Feature Award at the 36th Frameline San Francisco LGBT Film Festival. His debut feature film "Snails in the Rain" was released in 2013 as the opening film of TLVFest, Tel Aviv International LGBT Film Festival and had its International Premier at the First Films World Competition of the 2013 Montreal World Film Festival. Leading actors Moran Rosenblatt and Yoav Reuveni won a Special acting award as part of the 2013 TLVFest. Both The Invisible Men and Snails in the Rain were selected as The Gay UK and 10 Best Israeli Gay Movies. In 2015, he served as part of TLVFest Jury.

In 2016, his film, co-produced and edited by Yael Perlov, Ben-Gurion, Epilogue, focused on the last years of David Ben-Gurion's life and revealed for the first time a long interview with David Ben-Gurion, in which he expressed himself freely about the country and his life. The film had its World premiere at the 2016 Jerusalem Film Festival. The film won the 2017 Ophir Israeli Academy Award for Best Feature Documentary and was commercially distributed in theaters all over Israel and at Film Forum New York. The film had its US premiere at the 32nd Santa Barbara International Film Festival and opened the 2017 LA Israel Film Festival. The film received excellent notices in The New York Times, the Los Angeles Times and The Hollywood Reporter.

As of 2018, he teaches at the Steve Tisch Film School at Tel Aviv University.

His film Eizenkot was released in 2019. The documentary accompanied the 21st Chief of General Staff of the Israel Defense Forces, Lieutenant general Gadi Eizenkot in his last months in uniform, and received an exclusive approach to the chief of staff's role. The film was broadcast by Israeli Kan 11 and produced by IDF Spokesperson.

A documentary series The Devil’s Confession: The Lost Eichmann Tapes was broadcast on Israeli television in the summer of 2022 drawing on interview recordings of Adolf Eichmann made by a Dutch Nazi journalist Willem Sassen in Argentina during 1957. "This is proof against Holocaust deniers and a way to see the true face of Eichmann", Mozer told The New York Times.

Mozer is a member of the European Film Academy, a member of the Israeli Documentary Filmmakers Forum, and a member of the Israeli Academy of Film and Television.

== Filmography as Director ==
- 2003 Passiflora Waltz
- 2008 My First War
- 2009 Bed Stories
- 2009 There must be another way
- 2012 The Invisible Men
- 2013 Snails in the Rain
- 2016 Ben-Gurion, Epilogue
- 2018 To Err is Human (Litot Ze Enoshi)
- 2019 Eizenkot.
- 2022 The Devil's Confession: The Lost Eichmann Tapes
- 2024 We Will Dance Again

== Filmography as Producer ==
- 2006 52/50
- 2006 Hot House
- 2006 Monkey Business (HaMilchama Shel Giori)
- 2006 Hummus Curry
- 2007 Six Days in June
- 2007 The Talkbackers
- 2008 My First War
- 2008 The House on Tabenkin Street
- 2008 The Heart of Jenin
- 2008 Between Two Passovers
- 2009 The Life and Death of Gotel Botel
- 2009 My Child Will Sing Again
- 2009 Prince of Jerusalem
- 2009 Bus
- 2011 Jeannette
- 2012 The Invisible Men
- 2012 Heritage
- 2013 Snails in the Rain
- 2016 Ben-Gurion, Epilogue
- 2018 To Err is Human (Litot Ze Enoshi)
