= Zero (2024 film) =

- Theatrical release poster
- Directed by: Jean Luc Herbulot
- Written by: Jean Luc Herbulot
- Produced by: Steven Adams; Pamela Diop; Gary Dourdan; Hus Miller
- Starring: Hus Miller; Gary Dourdan; Roger Sallah; Moran Rosenblatt; Willem Dafoe
- Cinematography: Grégory Turbellier
- Edited by: Raphael Lubczanski
- Music by: James BKS
- Production companies: Alta Global Media; Tableland Pictures
- Distributed by: Well Go USA Entertainment
- Release dates: October 10, 2024 (Sitges Film Festival); April 11, 2025 (United States)
- Running time: 88 minutes
- Country: United States
- Language: English

Zero is a 2024 American action comedy film written and directed by Jean Luc Herbulot. It stars Hus Miller, Cam McHarg, Gary Dourdan, Roger Sallah, Moran Rosenblatt, and Willem Dafoe.

The film premiered at the Sitges Film Festival on October 10, 2024, and it was released in the United States on April 11, 2025.

== Premise ==
Two American strangers searching for purpose in the city of Dakar, Senegal, wake up with bombs strapped to their chests, counting down from ten hours.

== Cast ==
- Hus Miller as #1
- Gary Dourdan as Daniel
- Roger Sallah as Onaye
- Moran Rosenblatt as India
- Willem Dafoe as voice on the phone

== Production ==
In July 2024, it was revealed that Jean Luc Herbulot had written and directed an action comedy film titled Zero.

== Release ==
Zero premiered at the Sitges Film Festival on October 10, 2024. It was released in the United States on April 11, 2025.

== Reception ==
On the review aggregator website Rotten Tomatoes, 53% of 19 critics' reviews are positive, with an average rating of 5.8/10.
