= Snails in the Rain =

2013 Israeli film directed by Yariv Mozer

- Promotional artwork
- Directed by: Yariv Mozer
- Screenplay by: Yariv Mozer
- Story by: Yossi Avni-Levy
- Produced by: Hila Aviram
- Starring: Yoav Reuveni; Moran Rosenblatt; Yehuda Nahari; Yariv Mozer
- Release date: June 20, 2013 (Israel)
- Running time: 85 min
- Country: Israel
- Language: Hebrew

Snails in the Rain (Hebrew: שבלולים בגשם Shablulim BaGeshem) is a 2013 Israeli drama film directed by Yariv Mozer and based on a short story by Yossi Avni-Levy. The story comes from Avni-Levy's 1995 book, The Garden of Dead Trees. It centres on Boaz (Yoav Reuveni) as his suppressed same-sex attraction threatens his relationship with his girlfriend, Noa, (Moran Rosenblatt). The film premiered at TLVFest in Tel Aviv on 8 June 2013, before receiving a theatrical release in Israel on 20 June.

== Plot summary ==
In 1989 Tel Aviv, the film revolves around Boaz (Reuveni), a handsome student, who receives love letters from an unknown man, which undermines his sexual identity and threatens his stable relationship with his girlfriend. Boaz becomes consumed by his suppressed attraction towards men. He begins to feel that he is an object of sexual desire to the men he encounters everywhere, at the swimming pool, in the library, on the street and in the library.

== Cast ==
- Yoav Reuveni as Boaz
- Moran Rosenblatt as Noa, Boaz's girlfriend
- Yehuda Nahari Halevi as Nir, Boaz's army friend
- Ori Yaniv as Ori
- Hava Ortman as Ruth, Boaz's mother
- Yariv Mozer as Prof. Richlin
- Eyal Cohen as Mechanic
- Ron Paran as Librarian
- Lior Soroka as Student in the library
- Adi Doyev as Michal
- Eyal Kantiv as Student in the pool
- Shak Brenner as MPA
- Itay Gonen as Youth in Independence Park
- Stav Strashko as Youth in Independence Park
- Yoni Etiel as Neighbor across the street
- Amir I. Wolf as Folk dance instructor
- Yaron Biton as Male escort
- Guy Lubalchik as Yoni
- Keren Elrom as Girlfriend in the Living Room
- Yoni Geva as Student

== Production ==
As the film is set in 1989, the filmmakers focused on inserting particular details from the era such as household brands, products, Game Boy consoles and advertisements to set the scene. In addition, archive footage is inserted from the 1980s Israeli TV show, Pitsuchim with the host Shosh Atari. Mozer also used radio recordings from Atari's "Chadash, Chadish, U-mechudash" show. Mozer explained that he associated the voice of Atari with his own childhood.

=== Short story ===
The film is based on a short story taken from the 1995 book, "The Garden of Dead Trees" by Yossi Avni-Levy. The collection of stories concerns Tel Aviv gay community became a cornerstone of Israeli LGBT literature. The stories are drawn from real people that Avni-Levy knew in Tel Aviv's gay community.

Mozer spoke about how he was influenced to adapt Avni-Levy's work. "I was moved by the story," recalled Mozer. "It was very unusual to find gay literature in Tel Aviv. In fact, in some places it is still very much controversial." Mozer had come out of the closet at the age of 25, having struggled with repressed feelings and confusion: “Of course, my choice to make a film based on Yossi Avni-Levi’s story is no coincidence,” Mozer continues: “I lived in the closet for about a decade and I always say that this period is a kind of open wound or scar that stays with you for many years. This film returns to this period, breaking the doors of the closet wide open, in an effort to break away from it forever.”

=== Casting ===
To better understand the challenges facing actors, Mozer decided to act in the film himself, taking on the role of Professor Richlin. He studied under acting coach Ruth Dytches in preparation for this role. Mozer explained, "I chose him [Prof. Richlin] because his story is more like my own. I felt more like him and could identify with him."

Mozer cast Yoav Reuveni, a male model, in his first film role. Mozer told Ynet: "He's exactly what I was looking for as Boaz - a guy whose beauty knocks both men and women out." Reuveni is heterosexual and had not had any homosexual experiences to draw upon for the film. Therefore, to connect Reuveni with the sexually charged and traumatic atmosphere he was seeking to create, Mozer engaged with Reuveni's experiences as a conscripted soldier in the Israel Defense Forces: "My way of solving this was to return Yoav to the traumatic place he had in his military service in the Second Lebanon War. He was a soldier who experienced situations between life and death...And so Yoav identified and allowed himself to connect with this character of Boaz."

=== Filming ===
Citing Tom Ford's A Single Man as inspiration, Mozer and cinematographer Shahar Reznik opted to film in a documentary style with the Sony F3, an older camera known for its Super 35 sensor and excellent treatment of highlights and aliasing. Mozer and Reznik sought to use light and color in an authentic yet vintage look.

The project was filmed in 2011, two years before its release, in Tel Aviv and also features scenes in Independence Park. These scenes depict a period when the park was known as a meeting place for cruising for gay men.

== Release ==
The film premiered at TLVFest in Tel Aviv on 8 June 2013, before receiving a theatrical release on 20 June.

The film also premiered at a number of festivals around the world in 2013 and 2014, including the UK Jewish Film Festival, the Chicago International Film Festival and the Montreal World Film Festival.

== Reception ==
The film was nominated for Best Feature Film at the Ophir Awards in 2013. Reuveni and Rosenblatt won top acting awards for Best Actor and Best Actress at TLVFest.

Oscar Getty of the Star Observer, a long-running Australian LGBT magazine wrote a positive review of the film, describing it as a "a compelling portrait of a couple in crisis", continuing "To his credit, film director Yariv Mozer captures the erotic mystique of army life in a beautiful and understated manner."
