= Wedding Doll =

2015 film

- Film poster
- חתונה מנייר
- Directed by: Nitzan Gilady
- Written by: Nitzan Giladi
- Starring: Asi Levy; Moran Rosenblatt; Roy Assaf; Aryeh Cherner; Aviva Ger; Oded Leopold; Udi Persi; Yehuda Nahari; Tomer Kapon; Lilach Birt; Hader Ratzon Rotem; Itzik Giuli; Aviv Elkabeth; Ofir Nahari
- Release date: 15 July 2015
- Running time: 82 minutes
- Country: Israel
- Language: Hebrew

Wedding Doll (or Hatuna MeNiyar, Hebrew: חתונה מנייר) is a 2015 Israeli drama film directed by Nitzan Gilady. It was nominated for Best Film at the 2015 Ophir Awards.

The story is set in Mitzpe Ramon and follows a young woman with an intellectual disability who works in a toilet paper factory. She dreams of becoming independent and marrying the factory owner's son.

The film was screened at several international film festivals, including the 2015 Toronto International Film Festival in Canada, the 2015 BFI London Film Festival in England, the 2015 Tallinn Black Nights Film Festival in Estonia, and the 2015 VValladolid International Film Festival in Spain.

The movie was filmed in Mitzpe Ramon and features numerous scenes of the Great Crater, ibexes, and Camel Hill.

== Plot ==
Hagit is a 24-year-old woman living with her mother, Sarah, in Mitzpe Ramon. She has a mild intellectual disability, characterized by slow speech and a lack of intellectual maturity. Hagit works at a small toilet paper factory owned by Arie and his wife Pnina. The factory also employs Omri, Arie and Pnina’s son.

Sarah, a divorced single mother, works as a hotel housekeeper in Mitzpe Ramon. Aware of Hagit’s limitations, she is overly protective, much to Hagit’s frustration, as she considers herself "grown-up and independent." Sarah tries to introduce Hagit to Elad, who has a similar intellectual capacity, but Hagit refuses, as she is in love with Omri.

Chen, Hagit’s brother, is married with a child but does not assist Sarah in caring for Hagit. He believes she should be moved to a group home, a view shared by Moshe, Sarah’s ex-husband.

Hagit is infatuated with Omri, who shows her kindness, though partly out of pity. She dreams of marrying him someday. The two bond at the factory, where Hagit makes a paper bride doll and Omri crafts a paper groom. They often sit together on a cliff overlooking the Ramon Crater, sharing conversations and light kisses.

Sarah struggles to build a romantic relationship with Chaim because she cannot leave Hagit alone.

The factory faces financial difficulties, and Arie plans to close it despite Omri’s protests. Hagit looks for a job at a bridal salon in Be'ersheba, but the owner rejects her. Omri hopes to save the factory by purchasing new machinery and borrows money from his friends, Eli and Simon, but Arie dismisses the idea and insists Omri study in Canada after catching him kissing Hagit.

Omri tells his friends he plans to leave, prompting them to throw a farewell party at the factory, inviting Hagit, who mistakenly believes it is a wedding. She designs a wedding dress out of toilet paper rolls and arrives at the party. Eli and Simon mock her and harass her while Omri fails to intervene. Heartbroken, she runs away into the night. Sarah searches for her and eventually finds her on the road, bringing her back home.

Sarah decides to place Hagit in a group home, and Hagit does not resist. As they drive to the home, Hagit holds her paper bride doll out the car window and lets it fall, symbolizing the end of her dream to marry.

== Cast ==
Actor Name	Character
Moran Rosenblatt	Hagit
Asi Levy	Sara
Roy Assaf	Omri
Aryeh Cherner	Aryeh
Itzik Giuli	David
Tomer Kapon	Chen

== Awards ==
Moran Rosenblatt won the Ophir Award for Best Actress for her performance, and Karen Eyal Melamed won the Ophir Award for Costume Design. The film received seven additional Ophir nominations, including Best Film, Best Director (Nitzan Gilady), Best Actor (Roy Assaf), Best Supporting Actress (Asi Levi), Best Cinematography (Roy Rot), Best Artistic Design (Dina Kornowitz), and Best Casting (Nitzan Gilady).

At the 2015 Jerusalem Film Festival, Nitzan Gilady won the Haggiag Award for Best Debut Feature.

== Reception ==
Wedding Doll scored 80% on Rotten Tomatoes, which was based on 25 reviews. The film was also ranked as "generally favorable", by 11 critics of Metacritic as well as 2.56 out of 5 stars from Glenn Kenny of RogerEbert.com. Sheri Linden of The Hollywood Reporter said that the film is "sensitively told, with a powerful sense of place".
