= Brenner Prize =

Israeli literary award

- Awarded for: Awarded for literary works
- Country: Israel
- Presented by: Hebrew Writers Association in Israel and Haft Family Foundation
- First award: 1945; 81 years ago

The Brenner Prize is an Israeli literary prize awarded annually by the Hebrew Writers Association in Israel and the Haft Family Foundation. It recognizes and honors Hebrew literature.

It was founded in the name of the author Yosef Haim Brenner and was first awarded in 1945.

Yossi Avni-Levy was awarded the 2024 prize for his novel, Three Days of Summer.
