= TLVFest =

LGBTQ film festival in Israel

TLVFest - Tel Aviv International LGBTQ+ Film Festival
- Location: Tel Aviv, Israel
- Founded: 1 January 2006; 20 years ago
- Founded by: Yair Hochner
- Website: www.tlvfest.com/en/

TLVFest, officially the Tel Aviv International LGBTQ+ Film Festival (Hebrew: הפסטיבל הבינלאומי לקולנוע גאה), is an annual film festival held in Tel Aviv, Israel. The festival is focused on LGBTQ-themed film from around the world.

The festival, based at the Tel Aviv Cinematheque. is open to all types of audiences, not only to members of the LGBTQ community. The festival also spotlights LGBTQ Palestinian films, consults LGBTQ Palestinians in its film selection process, and is outspoken in its commitment to Palestinian human rights.

The festival is increasingly active outside Tel Aviv, and bringing LGBTQ culture across the country to cities and towns such as Sderot, Beersheba, Haifa, Jerusalem, Kibbutz Mizra, Rosh Pina, Ness Ziona, and Pardes Hanna-Karkur,

The festival runs around the same time as, sometimes concurrently, with Tel Aviv Pride.

== History ==
TLVFest was founded by Yair Hochner. The first-ever LGBT film festival in Tel Aviv was held in 2006, and focused on LGBT-themed films that would otherwise never have received theatrical, TV or DVD distribution in Israel. The festival took place at the Ha’ozen Hashlishit (Hebrew for "Third Ear") music venue on King George Street and screened in five tiny theaters of 20–40 seats each. The festival opened with Greg Araki’s Mysterious Skin and the festival sold out every film, attracting more than 2,000 people.

The festival moved to the bigger Tel Aviv Cinematheque in 2007. IndieWire included it in its list of "10 LGBT Fests You Can’t Miss" in 2014 and 2015.

TLVFest founded TLVFest Drag Star Search, a competition for Israeli drag queens and drag kings. It has hosted drag artists from around the world including Peaches Christ, Sherry Vine, Jinkx Monsoon, Sharon Needles, Peppermint, and Alexis Michelle.

In 2020, due to COVID-19, the festival moved to November.

== Guests ==
Over the years, the festival's guests have included Debra Messing, Alan Cumming, Lea DeLaria, film producer Christine Vachon (Boys Don’t Cry, Carol, Far From Heaven); LGBT community 'legends' such as Bruce La Bruce, John Waters-star Mink Stole, Wieland Speck (Berlinale Panorama curator), Michael Stutz, Kim Yutani (director of programming for the Sundance Film Festival), Lorenzo Vigas (Golden Lion Award Winner/Venice Film Festival – From Afar), Marcio Reolon, Filipe Matzembacher (Teddy Award Winner/Berlin International Film Festival – Hard Paint), Martín Rodríguez Redondo (Marilyn), Jay Brannan (Shortbus), Jamie Babbit (But I’m a Cheerleader), Angela Robinson (D.E.B.S.), Cheryl Dunye (The Watermelon Woman), Mark Christopher (54), Alantė Kavaitė (The Summer of Sangailė), Daniel Ribeiro (The Way He Looks), Melanie Mayron (Snapshots), Madeleine Olnek (Wild Nights with Emily), Thom Fitzgerald (The Hanging Garden); international trans activists and performers: Buck Angel, Gigi Gorgeous, Miss Rosewood, Zazie de Paris, Maya Jafer and many more.

== Opening Night Films ==
- 2006 - Mysterious Skin
- 2007 - The Gymnast
- 2008 - FD Tel Aviv
- 2009 - Strella
- 2010 - I Love you Phillip Morris
- 2011 - Melting Away
- 2012 - Leave It on the Floor
- 2013 - Snails in The Rain
- 2014 - Guttman X 5
- 2015 - Fresno
- 2016 - Oriented
- 2017 - The Wound
- 2018 - My Days of Mercy
- 2019 - 15 Years
- 2024 - The Belle from Gaza
- 2025 - Kiss of the Spider Woman

== Selected films, screened at festival ==
- Mysterious Skin. Directed by Greg Araki
- One Kiss. Directed by Ivan Cotroneo
- The Wound. Directed by John Trengove

== Controversies ==
=== Funding 2012 ===
The Israeli Film Council threatened to withdraw funding for the festival; however it did not cancel the funding.

=== Calls for boycott ===
==== 2017 ====
A number of scheduled speakers canceled their attendance at the event in response to pressure from the BDS movement. The speakers who withdrew their participation are South African director John Trengrove, Canadian author and screenwriter of Pakistani descent Fawzia Mirza, Palestinian Nadia Ibrahim, who was supposed to sit in a jury panel, and Swiss Jasna Fritzi Bauer, though only Trengrove, Mirza and Ibrahim cited the BDS movement. Jasna Fritzi Bauer and Helene Hegemann claimed schedule clashes as a reason for cancellation. Despite speakers withdrawal, there were not changes in the screen program and the films of those who cancelled their participation were shown during the festival. John Trengrove cancelled his participation after he arrived to Israel on festival dime. Palestinian Israeli actress Samira Saraya and filmmaker Maysaloun Hamoud participated in the festival.

==== 2020 ====
More than 100 filmmakers from 15 countries signed a petition launched by the Palestinian Campaign for the Academic and Cultural Boycott of Israel calling for a boycott of the festival out of solidarity with the struggle by the Palestinian queer community. Among the signatories are filmmakers Charlotte Prodger, Alain Guiraudie, Thomas Allen Harris, Harjant Gill, Ian Iqbal Rashid, Sarah Schulman, John Greyson, Adrian Stimson, Richard Fung, Catherine Gund and Raquel Freire, as well as film scholars Alexandra Juhasz, Thomas Waugh, Marc Siegel, Shohini Ghosh and Chris Berry.

==== 2021 ====
In October 2021, over 200 celebrities, including Mila Kunis, Billy Porter, Neil Patrick Harris, Helen Mirren, Lance Bass and Jeremy Piven, signed an open letter rejecting calls for a boycott of the Tel Aviv International LGBT Film Festival.
