= Moran Rosenblatt =

Israeli actress

- מורן רוזנבלט
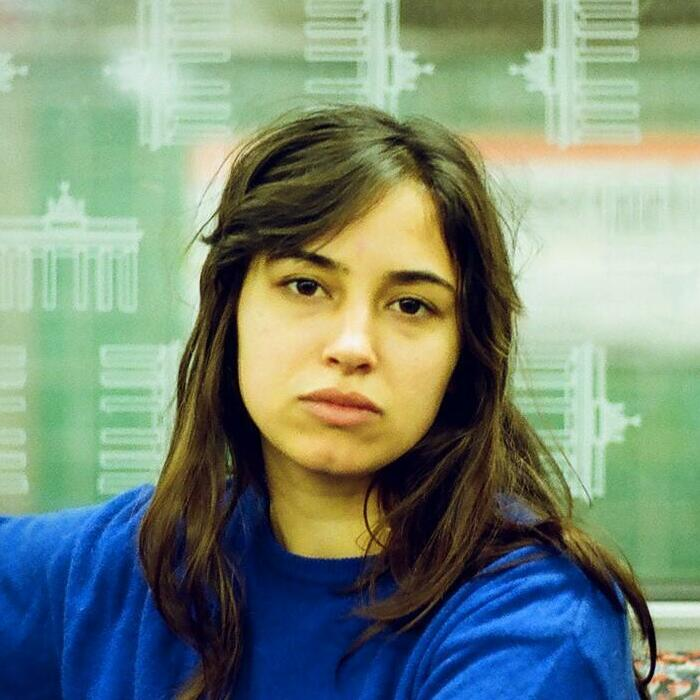
- Rosenblatt in 2010
- Born: 14 September 1985 (age 40); Tel Aviv, Israel
- Education: Sam Spiegel Film and Television School; HaDerech Studio
- Occupations: Actress, director, writer, and producer
- Years active: 2011–present
- Notable work: Fauda; Hit & Run; We Were the Lucky Ones; Wedding Doll
- Awards: Jerusalem Film Festival Best Actress (2011); Ophir Award Best Actress (2015)

Moran Rosenblatt (Hebrew: מורן רוזנבלט; born 14 September 1985) is an Israeli actress.

== Biography ==
Moran Rosenblatt was born in Tel Aviv, and was raised in Tel Aviv city centre. At the age of six, her family moved to Tokhnit Lamed. She graduated secondary school at the Tichon Hadash.

She studied at Eyal Cohen and Ruth Dytches' HaDerech Studio, and the Nissan Nativ Acting Studio.

In 2016, she finished her screenwriting studies at the Sam Spiegel Film and Television School.

== Career ==
Rosenblatt won Best Actress at the Jerusalem Film Festival for her 2011 role in Lipstikka then in 2015, won the Best Actress Ophir Award for Wedding Doll. She was cast in television series Fauda. In 2021, she starred in the Netflix series Hit & Run.

== Filmography ==
Filmography
| Release year | Format | Media | Role | Note(s) |
|---|---|---|---|---|
| 2011 | Film | Lipstikka | Young Inam | |
| 2011 | Short film | My Beautiful Sister | Reut | |
| 2011 | Series | Simaney She'ela | | In 3 episodes |
| 2013 | Film | A Place in Heaven | Yaela | |
| 2013 | Short film | Deserted | Shiri | |
| 2013 | Short film | My Brother & I | Reut | |
| 2013 | Film | Snails in the Rain | Noa | |
| 2014 | Series | Very Important Person | Mika | |
| 2015 | Series | Ishto Shel Giora | Galit | |
| 2015 | Film | Apples from the Desert | Rivka Abarbanel | |
| 2015 | Series | False Flag | Dikla Levi | |
| 2015 | Short film | The Invitation | Noa | |
| 2015 | Film | Wedding Doll | Hagit | |
| 2016 | Film | If You're Happy | | Writer, producer & director |
| 2016 | Short film | One Last Time | | |
| 2017 | | Baumschlager | Rania | |
| 2017 | Series | Chateau Ein Karem | Shira | |
| 2018 | Series | Fauda | Anat Moreno | |
| 2018 | Film | Red Cow | Yael | |
| 2020 | Series | HaKoach Sha'arayim | Sivan | |
| 2020 | Film | Kiss Me Kosher/Kiss Me Before It Blows Up | Shira Shalev | |
| 2021 | Series | Hit & Run | Tali Shapira | |
| 2021 | Film | Take the 'A' Train | Hagar | |
| 2022 | Film | Making Of | Sharon | |
| 2024 | Series | We Were The Lucky Ones | Herta | |
| 2024 | Film | Zero | India | |

Theatrical appearances
| Year | Play | Role | Author | Theatre | Note(s) |
|---|---|---|---|---|---|
| 2011 | D-ale carnavalului | Mița | Ion Luca Caragiale | Karov Theatre | |
| 2011 | Les Mouches | | Jean-Paul Sartre | Karov Theater | |
| 2011 | La Casa de Bernarda Alba | | Federico García Lorca | Tzavta | |
| 2017 | מקודשת | | Moran Rosenblatt | Incubator | |
| 2017–2018 | Yerma | Yerma | Federico García Lorca | Tmu-na Theater | |

Awards
| Year | Won | Nominated | For |
|---|---|---|---|
| 2011 | The Haggiag Family Award for Best Actress | Ophir Award for Best Actress | Lipstikka |
| 2015 | Undependent Short Film award | | If You're Happy |
| 2015 | Ophir Award for Best Actress | | Wedding Doll |
| 2017 | The Golden Hedgehog Fringe Theater Award | | Yerma |

== Personal life ==
In October 2017, it was published, that she was in a relationship with the actress Joy Rieger. In September 2018, they broke up.
