= Yossi Avni-Levy =

Israeli writer and diplomat

- יוסי אבני לוי
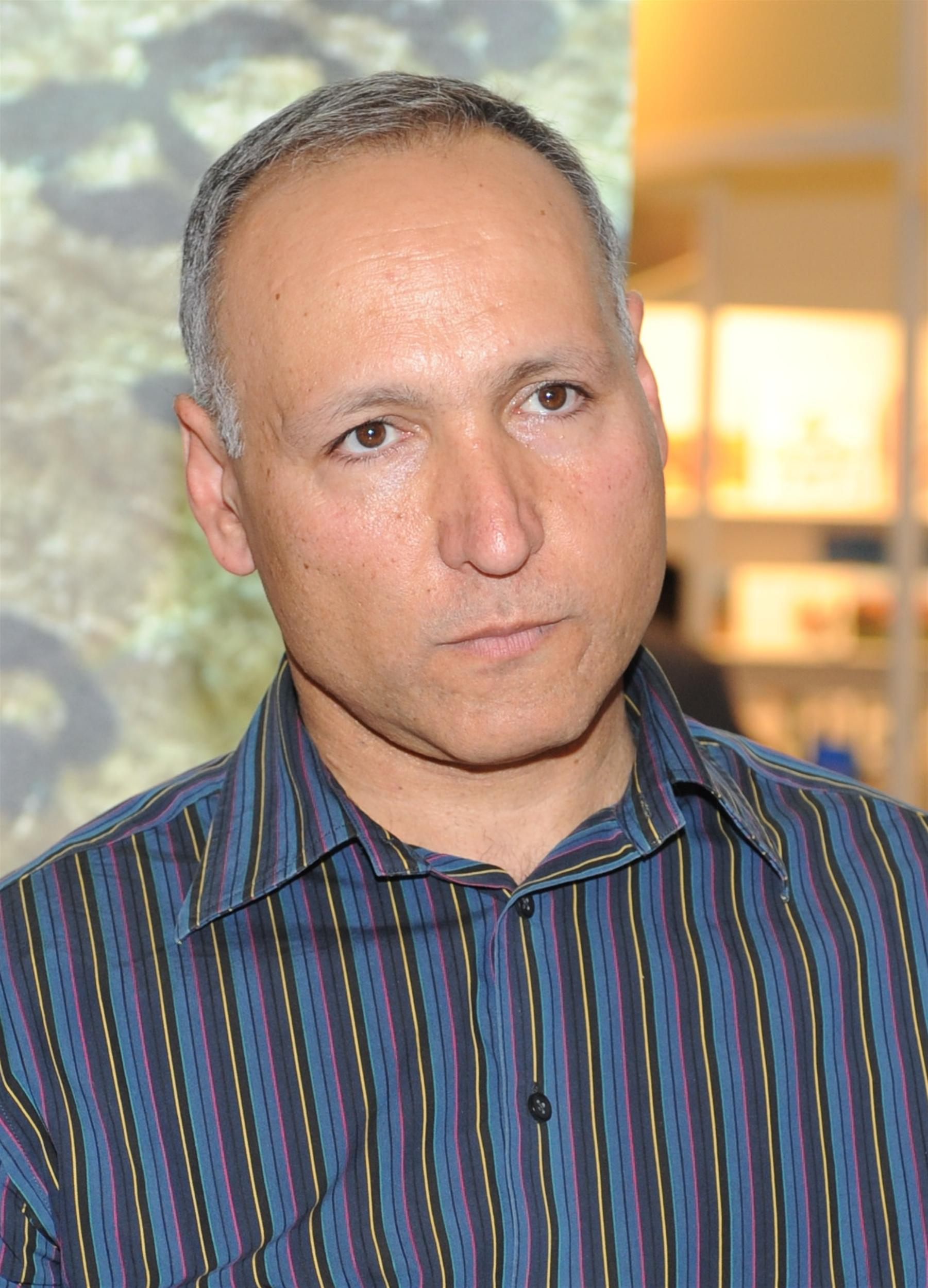
- Yossi Avni-Levy

Ambassador of Israel to Lithuania
- Incumbent
- Assumed office 2020

Ambassador of Israel to Serbia
- In office 2011–2016

Personal details
- Born: 25 May 1962 (age 64) Israel
- Education: Hebrew University of Jerusalem (BA, LLB)
- Occupation: Diplomat; Writer
- Awards: Prime Minister's Prize for Hebrew Literary Works; Brenner Prize
- Writing career
- Notable works: Garden of the Dead Trees; Four Sons; Auntie Farhuma Wasn't a Whore After All; A Man Without Shadow; Ode of the Sins

Yossi Avni-Levy (Hebrew: יוסי אבני לוי; born 25 May 1962) is an Israeli writer and diplomat. He has served in various positions in Israeli embassies in Berlin, Bonn, Belgrade, and Warsaw. He is Israel’s ambassador to Lithuania. From 2011 until 2016, he was Ambassador to Serbia.

Avni-Levy is the author of the books Garden of the Dead Trees, Four Sons, Auntie Farhuma wasn't a whore after all, A Man without Shadow, Ode of the Sins and Three Days in Summer.

He is the recipient of many awards and honours, among them the Prime Minister's Prize for Hebrew Literary Works, the Brenner Prize and the Sapir Prize.

== Early life and education ==
Avni-Levy was born 25 May 1962 in Ra'anana Israel, to an Afghan Jewish father and an Iranian Jewish mother. He graduated with honors from Hebrew University in Jerusalem in history of the Middle East and Arabic in 1983, earning a bachelor of laws (LLB) degree from the Faculty of Law in 1991.

== Career ==
Avni-Levy's writing is personal and poetic and is noteworthy for its intimacy. The extended periods he has spent outside Israel on diplomatic postings are reflected in his works.

He published short stories under the pen name Yossi Avni in the literary supplements to Maariv and Haaretz. He won first prize in Hebrew University's annual contest in 1988, first prize in a contest sponsored by "At (You)" in 1991, and third prize in the Haaretz short story contest for his story "Pains" in 1991. His travelogue, "Journey," was included in the first issue of the journal Rechov (Street).

In 1995 he published the short story collection, "The Garden of Dead Trees". The collection of stories concerns Tel Aviv gay community and became a cornerstone of Israeli LGBT literature. The stories are drawn from real people that Avni-Levy knew in Tel Aviv's gay community.

Several of his stories were included in anthologies in German, Italian, and English. Avni has also published book reviews (Haaretz, Yedioth Aharonoth) and literary reports ("Cappuccino in Three Crosses Square," Haaretz literary and cultural supplement, January 2007). Avni's story "Journey" was also included in the 1998 collection 50 Years, 50 Stories : a selection of short stories edited by Zisi Satuy of Yidioth Aharonoth. His story "Nice Words of Farewell" was included in the collection Murder Close to Home : stories about murders of Israelis edited by Dorit Zilberman and Aviva Gefen and published by Keter in 2001.

In 2007, he released the novel A Man Without Shadow (Ish Lelo Tzel), which became a best-seller in Israel.

He was invited by the Polish Literature Association to give lectures in Poland (Warsaw, Kraków, Katowice) in September 2007 and gave lectures on his writing at Harvard, Yale, Cornell and Brandeis universities in the United States in April 2008.

His 2010 novel, "Ode of the Sins" (Shira HaHataim) deals with the Holocaust, he explained that although he is of Persian and Afghan descent "I write about it [the Holocaust] because it's part of my internal identity card. I'm sure it's connected to the concept of the victim that I internalized during my childhood."

In 2013, a short story from his 1996 short story collection, "The Garden of Dead Trees" was adapted into the film, Snails in the Rain.

In November 2024, among a pool of 78 submissions, he was awarded the Brenner Prize, a prestigious accolade recognizing excellence in Hebrew literature. It was awarded to Avni-Levy for his novel, "Three Days in Summer". The novel depicts the routines and experiences of a fictional Jewish community in Lithuania in the days immediately preceding its destruction during the Nazi invasion.

== Personal life ==
He is openly gay.

== Bibliography ==
- 1995: The Garden of Dead Trees (Heb. Gan Ha-Etzim Ha-Metim), published in German, by Suhrkamp Verlag/Frankfurt and by Männerschwarm Verlag/Hamburg.
- 1998: Four Sons (Heb. Arba'a Banim)
- 2003: Auntie Farhuma wasn't a whore, after all (Heb. Doda Farhuma Lo Haita Zona), published in Polish Sic! publishing house.
- 2007: A Man Without Shadow (Heb. Ish Lelo Tzel), published in Serbian by Narodna biblioteka Srbije.
- 2010: Ode of the Sins (Heb. Shira HaHataim)
- 2024: Three Days in Summer (Heb. Shlosha Yamim BaKayitz)
